= Gina Beck =

British actress (born 1981)

- Origin: High Wycombe, Buckinghamshire, England
- Genres: Musical Theatre
- Occupations: Actress, singer, voice actress
- Years active: 2004–present
- Website: www.ginabeck.com

Gina Beck (born on 30th December 1981 in Buckinghamshire) is a British stage actress and singer, mainly known for playing major roles in various West End musicals. She played the characters of Miss Honey in the Royal Shakespeare Company's production of Matilda the Musical, Magnolia Hawks in Daniel Evans production of the 1927 musical Show Boat, Glinda the Good Witch in Wicked, both in the London production and the 1st national tour, Christine Daaé in the West End production of Andrew Lloyd Webber's 1986 musical The Phantom of the Opera, Sarah Brown in the 2025 London revival of Guys and Dolls, and Cosette in Les Misérables.

== Background ==
Gina Beck was born in High Wycombe, Buckinghamshire, England, but moved to Hampshire with her parents at an early age. She attended local schools and was introduced to the stage through school and amateur groups. She passed her Grade 8 singing examination at the age of fifteen and gained experience in both solo and ensemble singing as a founder member of the Hampshire Children's Choir and subsequently, the Hampshire County Youth Choir.

In her teens, she had many acting and singing roles at Perins School and Peter Symonds College in Winchester and was also engaged professionally to play leading roles in productions at Winchester College (Gianetta in L’élisir d’Amoré, 1999; Beatrice in Much Ado About Nothing, 2000 and Emily Tallentire in The Hired Man, 2001). Her first break into musical theatre occurred when she auditioned successfully at the age of 14 for the National Youth Music Theatre (NYMT) of Great Britain. She performed in their production of Warchild in various English cathedrals during 1997. The following year she played the leading role of Kate Hardcastle in The Kissing Dance, a new musical written for the NYMT by Charles Hart and Howard Goodall based on Goldsmith's She Stoops to Conquer. The show was performed to great critical acclaim at the Brighton and Edinburgh Festivals, The Lyric Theatre Hammersmith, and The Linbury Studio Theatre, Covent Garden amongst other venues. She reprised this role in the first professional production of The Kissing Dance in March 2011 at the Jermyn Street Theatre, off the West End. Her last role with the NYMT was as Guinevere in their Arthurian legend show Pendragon. Performances of this show included two tours to Japan.

== Career ==
After A-level exams, she successfully auditioned for an acting degree at the Royal Central School of Speech and Drama in London, from where she graduated with a BA in Acting in 2004. After graduation, she had a number of small cameo roles on TV (Doctors, Sherlock Holmes and the Case of the Silk Stocking, among others) and commenced a long-standing relationship with Pearson Education doing both voice-over and video recordings for English Language teaching media.

Beck performed in opera and operetta with Holland Park Opera (Puccini's Madame Butterfly and Donizetti's L'élisir d'Amoré) and the Buxton Opera House (Gilbert and Sullivan's Ruddigore and The Sorcerer).

In 2006 she toured South Africa in The Merry Widow and in June of that year made her West End debut as Cosette in Les Misérables at Queen's Theatre. She performed the role in the 21st anniversary celebration concert of Les Misérables which was broadcast on BBC Radio 2. After a year, she left the show to create the lead role of Rebecca Warshowsky for the world première of the new musical Imagine This at the Theatre Royal, Plymouth in July 2007. At Christmas 2007 Beck appeared as Wendy Darling in the Rachel Kavanaugh production of Peter Pan, the Musical at the Birmingham Rep.

She took over the principal role of Christine Daaé in The Phantom of the Opera at Her Majesty's Theatre in September 2008, for which she was nominated for a Theatre Fans Choice Award for Best Leading Actress in a Musical, 2010. She subsequently performed The Phantom duet with Ramin Karimloo at Andrew Lloyd Webber's 60th birthday concert in Hyde Park, London. She has sung the duet "All I Ask of You" with co-star Simon Bailey on the Grand Staircase of the actual Opera Garnier in Paris (where Phantom is set) for CBS television and the same song on the Alan Titchmarsh show on ITV1. On 3 October 2010 she appeared as part of the Alumni Ensemble in the 25th Anniversary Celebration of Les Misérables at London's O2 Arena and also appeared in the Les Misérables sequences in the 2010 Royal Variety Performance at The London Palladium. Later that year, Beck returned to The Phantom of the Opera as an emergency cover for Christine on 23 December, co-starring with John Owen-Jones. Beck also played Cosette as a voice role in the Focus on the Family Radio Theatre production of Les Miserables.

She has supported the music of young musical-theatre composer Steven Luke Walker. She has taken part in several workshops of his compositions for the musical based on the novel Little Women by Louisa May Alcott and, together with many stars from the West End, has performed in and helped promote a concert of his songs.

In June 2011, she made her debut in the leading role of Maria von Trapp in a new production of the Rodgers and Hammerstein musical The Sound of Music at the 3,000 seat Plenary Hall Convention Centre in Kuala Lumpur, Malaysia. In September 2011 she played Letitia Hardy in Hannah Cowley's restoration comedy The Belle's Stratagem at Southwark Playhouse. This was the first time in over 100 years that this play had been produced in London.

In December 2011, Beck took over the lead role of Glinda the Good Witch in the West End production of the musical Wicked, at the Apollo Victoria Theatre. She starred alongside Rachel Tucker and, later, Louise Dearman as Elphaba. She completed two years in the role at the Apollo Victoria Theatre in November 2013.

She also appeared as an extra/solo singer (turning woman 3) in the 2012 film adaptation of Les Misérables.

=== Return to Wicked (2013) – present ===
On 26 November 2013, it was announced that Gina Beck would be returning to the role of Glinda, this time in the United States, joining the cast of the first national tour of Wicked, alongside Alison Luff as Elphaba and Curt Hansen as Fiyero. She began performances on 16 December 2013 at the Oriental Theatre in Chicago, Illinois. This marks the first ever international transfer to join an American production for an actress playing Glinda. On 14 July 2014, it was announced that she would be leaving the First National Tour on 27 July 2014. She was replaced, as Glinda, by Chandra Lee Schwartz.

In November 2014 she performed in an Off-West End 5-week run of Jacques Brel is Alive and Well and Living in Paris at the Charing Cross Theatre

In April and May 2015 she played the role of Bathsheba Everdene in The Watermill Theatre's production of Far From the Madding Crowd

In 2015, Gina Beck played the leading role of Magnolia Hawks in Daniel Evans' acclaimed production of Kern and Hammerstein's classic and ground-breaking musical Show Boat at the Crucible Theatre in Sheffield. The production subsequently transferred to the West End at the New London Theatre in April 2016 for a limited run until August 2016.

In 2017 she recorded two songs for the album Wit & Whimsy – Songs by Alexander S. Bermange (one solo and one featuring all of the album's 23 artists), which reached No. 1 in the iTunes comedy album chart.

Gina Beck then joined the West End production of Matilda the Musical at the Cambridge Theatre, playing the role of Miss Honey, in September 2017. After an extremely successful run, she finally left the show in March 2020, just before the West End went dark because of the COVID-19 pandemic.

She was next scheduled to star as Ensign Nellie Forbush opposite Julian Ovenden in the Chichester Festival Theatre production of South Pacific but, due to COVID-19, the show was postponed to summer 2021. In the meantime, Gina appeared in the all-star outdoor Summer 2020 concerts at Chichester Festival Theatre.

Due to becoming pregnant, Beck shared her lead role in South Pacific with Alex Young during the summer of 2021. Beck returned to the role with fellow stars in the transfer to Sadler's Wells in July 2022, preceding a UK and Ireland tour.

== Filmography ==
Films
Year	Title	Role	Notes
2004	Sherlock Holmes and the Case of the Silk Stocking	Maid	TV movie
2010	Les Misérables in Concert: The 25th Anniversary	Female Worker 3 / Turning Woman 1	
2012	Les Misérables	Turning Woman #3	

Television Series
Year	Title	Role	Notes
2005	The Crust	Lydia D. Hemmingway	Episode: "Pizza Panther"
2008	Doctors	Carrie Harkness	Episode: "Heston C in Da House"

== Discography ==
Year	Song	Album	Label
2012	"Turning"	Les Misérables: The Motion Picture Soundtrack (Deluxe Edition)	Polydor Group
2013	"Once More" (with Steven Luke Walker)	Once More – Single	Eastern Star Music
