= Ginna Claire Mason =

American actress

Ginna Claire Mason is an American actress. She is best known for her Broadway and Hallmark Channel movie credits.

== Early life ==
Mason grew up in Brentwood, Tennessee, near Nashville. She grew up riding horses. At age 13, she visited New York and saw Wicked on Broadway for the first time. In 2013, she received her BFA from Elon University.

== Career ==
Mason's first Equity role was in the first national touring company of Footloose. She also toured with a national production of Newsies. After working as a standby for sixteen months and playing Glinda in the national tour, in 2019, Mason joined the Broadway cast of Wicked as Glinda.

Mason made her Hallmark Christmas movie debut in 2022 in A Holiday Spectacular. She starred in A Heidelberg Christmas in 2023. In 2024, Mason starred in the Hallmark movie A Carol for Two alongside her one-time Wicked costar Jordan Litz.

In 2025, Mason starred in the Hallmark movie Hats Off to Love, a Kentucky Derby-themed love story. She was also cast in A Newport Christmas, for which she is set to record a new original song.

== Personal life ==
Mason is married to Eric Moffet, a pilot. They have two children, Cooper and Annabelle. She is good friends and business partners with Mary Kate Morrisey, with whom she starred in Wicked.

In 2024, Mason delivered the commencement address at Elon University.
