= Jennifer DiNoia =

American singer and actress (born 1982)

- Born: Jennifer DiNoia; February 23, 1982 (age 43); Meriden, Connecticut
- Education: Francis T. Maloney High School; Point Park University
- Occupations: Actress, Singer, Dancer
- Known for: Playing Elphaba in Wicked since 2007
- Children: 1

Jennifer "Jenny" DiNoia (born February 23, 1982) is an American singer and stage actress. She is best known for her work in musical theatre, especially Wicked, playing the lead role of Elphaba in various productions around the world.

== Career ==
=== Early life and training ===
Jennifer DiNoia was born (and raised) in Meriden, Connecticut, on February 23, 1982. She began dancing at the age of 3, and at 6 years old, took part in a national tour of Rodgers and Hammerstein's The King and I. She continued to dance and sing through her youth, and eventually began attending Point Park University in Pittsburgh, majoring in dance. After taking a summer internship at the Broadway Dance Center, DiNoia opted to move to New York City in search of stage work, primarily as a dancer.

=== Personal life ===
Jennifer has a daughter named Joules Simeone Stassi. Joules was born on November 10, 2015, through caesarean section.

=== Stage work ===
DiNoia's first professional credit came when she was cast on the U.S. national tour of Mamma Mia!. She appeared in the ensemble, as well as providing cover for the role of Ali. In 2003, while on the Mamma Mia tour, DiNoia was inspired after hearing "Defying Gravity", the signature song from the recently released musical Wicked, and took her first professional singing lessons. In the Summer of 2004, DiNoia joined the Las Vegas production of We Will Rock You, appearing as part of the original American cast in the ensemble and later as understudy for the lead role Scaramouche.

== Wicked ==
After leaving We Will Rock You, DiNoia auditioned for Wicked, and was cast in the Chicago production, initially as a swing. She learned all nine dance parts and became emergency cover for the lead role of Elphaba. She officially became the standby for Elphaba in October 2007, providing cover for Dee Roscioli and then Lisa Brescia. DiNoia remained with the Chicago company until it closed on January 25, 2009, after at least 1,500 performances.

Following the closure, DiNoia transferred to the Broadway production of Wicked, taking over the role of Elphaba standby from Julie Reiber. In the November of the same year, DiNoia travelled to Sydney, Australia to provide emergency standby for Elphaba for one month, departing in December 2009. DiNoia returned to the Broadway company, and remained the Elphaba standby until August 2011, when she was replaced by Donna Vivino.

In June 2012, DiNoia returned to Wicked, this time with the Asian touring company. She appeared as an alternate Elphaba, performing in Seoul, South Korea when the lead Elphaba, Jemma Rix, was unavailable. This marked the third country that DiNoia had played Elphaba in. In October 2012, she briefly returned to the role as Elphaba standby in the Broadway company, before Vivino returned to the role one month later.

After appearing in Wicked in various roles for over six years, DiNoia finally was cast in the lead role of Elphaba on April 3, 2013, replacing Christine Dwyer on the "Munchkinland Tour" - the second national touring company. She appeared alongside Hayley Podschun, who played the role of Glinda. Both she and Podschun exited the company on March 31, 2014. DiNoia was replaced by Laurel Harris, while Podschun was replaced by Kara Lindsay. Later in 2014, DiNoia performed "Defying Gravity" at the opening ceremony of the 2014 Special Olympics in New Jersey. She then again served as temporary Elphaba standby on Broadway, before Lilli Cooper could take on the role.

In September 2014, DiNoia was revealed to be the next lead Elphaba in the West End production of Wicked. She became the second American to appear as Elphaba in London, following the original lead Idina Menzel, while the United Kingdom became the fourth country that DiNoia had played Elphaba in. She officially replaced Kerry Ellis on 27 October 2014, appearing opposite Savannah Stevenson as Glinda. Her limited engagement in London came to an end on 31 January 2015, when she was replaced by Elphaba standby Emma Hatton.

In February 2015 DiNoia joined the 1st national tour of Wicked in Los Angeles, CA for a limited four-week engagement, following the unexpected sudden departure of Elphaba actress Emma Hunton. She was part of the tour's final cast, and her run ended on March 15 when the tour closed after almost ten years on the road.

Following the closure of Wicked's 1st national tour, it was announced that DiNoia would be succeeding Christine Dwyer as temporary lead Elphaba in the Broadway production, at the Gershwin Theatre, starting on March 19, 2015. She played the role for 3 weeks until Caroline Bowman returned to the role after a break of almost 2 months.

On August 1, 2016, she rejoined the Broadway production of Wicked, replacing Rachel Tucker as lead Elphaba. She remained with the show until July 29, 2017, and was succeeded by Jackie Burns. DiNoia returned to the Broadway production on June 4, 2019, again becoming the standby for Elphaba.

DiNoia continued to provided standby and emergency cover for Elphaba on Broadway after the post-COVID reopening in September 2021, and temporarily took over the role full-time from October to December 2021 while Lindsay Pearce recovered from an injury. Alyssa Fox replaced her as standby Elphaba in July 2022.

Over the Thanksgiving weekend in 2022, DiNoia again stepped into the role of Elphaba as an emergency cover, giving two performances on Saturday, Nov 26 and one on Sunday, Nov 27. She again played Elphaba on November 29.

She then performed as emergency cover for Elphaba at The Kennedy Center in Washington, D.C. as part of the show's 2nd national tour from December 8–10, 2022. These were her last ever performances as Elphaba.

== Work as a recording artist ==
In August 2020, DiNoia was featured on the soundtrack Broadway Sings Blood Rock: The Musical with Andy Mientus, Damon Daunno, and Robert Torti.
