= Catherine Charlebois =

American actress

Catherine Charlebois (born July 16, 1987) is an American Broadway actress originally from Andover, Massachusetts. She is best known for her portrayal of Nessarose Thropp in the musical Wicked. She currently resides in Virginia.

== Education ==
Charlebois graduated from Andover High School (Massachusetts) in 2005 and from Syracuse University (New York) in 2009 with a BFA in musical theatre. During her time at Syracuse University, Charlebois played the following roles:

- Anabelle Glick – Lucky Stiff (Syracuse University Stage); October 5–17, 2007
- Hodel – Fiddler on the Roof (Syracuse University Stage); November 28 – December 30, 2007
- Johanna – Sweeney Todd (Syracuse University Stage); April 24 – May 10, 2008
- Mick's Pick, Ensemble – Steel Pier (Syracuse University Stage); Oct 3–12, 2008

== Professional career ==
- She is a stylist with a professional fashion/style blog
- Billie Delgado – Hurricane (NYTF; Theatre at St. Clement's); September 28 – October 10, 2009
- Universal Swing, Swing, u/s Nessarose, u/s Midwife – Wicked (All Productions); 2010
- Shelby – Steel Magnolias (Triad Stage); April 10 – May 8, 2011
- Nessarose – Wicked (Munchkinland Tour); January 17 – October 11, 2012
- Nessarose – Wicked (Gershwin Theatre); December 4, 2012 – May 25, 2014
- Nessarose (emergency cover) – Wicked (Munchkinland Tour); July 9 – Aug 28, 2014
- Nessarose (emergency cover) – Wicked (Gershwin Theatre); January 7, 2015 – Jan 21, 2015
- Nessarose – Wicked (Gershwin Theatre); Jan 22, 2015 – March 8, 2015
- Belle – Beauty and the Beast (Music Theatre Wichita); June 28 – July 3, 2016
- Nessarose – Wicked (Munchkinland Tour); August 22, 2017 – April 22, 2018
- Nessarose (emergency cover) Wicked (Munchkinland Tour); June 20, 2018 - August 5, 2018
- Nessarose (emergency cover) Wicked (Munchkinland Tour); December 23, 2021 - Present
