= Amanda Jane Cooper =

American actress

Amanda Jane Cooper (born June 15, 1988) is an American actress and singer who played the role of Glinda in Wicked and the guest role of Susan Channing on Jessie.

Cooper grew up in Valley Forge, Pennsylvania. She graduated from Great Valley High School in Malvern, Pennsylvania, and received her BFA from Carnegie Mellon University in Pittsburgh. She also studied singing with Paul Spencer Adkins. She played the character of Brooke in Smart People while attending college. She debuted in New York theatres in BUNKED! A New Musical, and while playing as Glinda at the John F. Kennedy Center for the Performing Arts, she performed for First Lady Michelle Obama. She has previously discussed her struggles with an eating disorder.

She met her husband, Andrew Bell, at church. They had originally planned to get married on April 29, 2020. Due to COVID-19 lockdowns, they had a courthouse wedding on March 18, 2020, and a Zoom ceremony for friends and family on April 4, 2020. Cooper and Bell renewed their vows on September 19, 2021. On November 2, 2023, Cooper publicly announced she was expecting her first child with Bell.

== Filmography ==
=== Film ===
Year	Title	Role	Notes
2008	Smart People	Brooke	
2009	Homecoming	Aleisha	
2013	Cavemen	Beth	
2020	First One In	Emily	

=== Television ===
Year	Title	Role	Notes
2012	CSI: Crime Scene Investigation	Lisa Kravitz	Episode: "Malice in Wonderland"
2012	Glee	Beatrice McClain	Episode: "The New Rachel"
2013	Bones	Courtney Johnson	Episode: "The Fact in the Fiction"
2013	Hello Ladies	Red-Headed Girl	Episode: "Pilot"
2013	Jessie	Susan Channing	Episode: "Understudied & Overdone"
2013	Masters of Sex	Sissy	Episode: "Phallic Victories"
2014	The Michaels	Lori	Television film
2014	Selfie	Eyelet	3 episodes
2018	A Very Wicked Halloween	—N/a	Television film
2020	Law & Order: SVU	Sherry Wagner	Episode: "Ballad of Dwight and Irena"
