= Kristoffer Cusick =

American actor (born 1974)

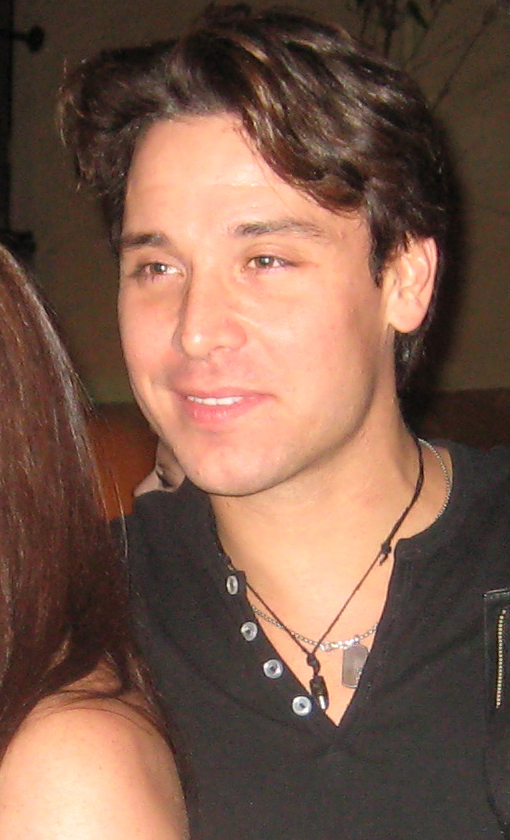
- Cusick at the Henry Fonda Theater
- Born: March 29, 1974 (age 52); Lakewood, California
- Occupations: Stage, film, television actor
- Website: kristoffercusick.com

Kristoffer Cusick (born March 29, 1974) is an American actor of stage, television and film. He has performed in such musicals as Saturday Night Fever, Rent and Wicked.

== Career ==
Cusick originated the role of Kenny as well as swing for the character Gus in the original Broadway cast of the musical Saturday Night Fever at the Minskoff Theater. It opened on October 21, 1999, and closed on December 30, 2000. Cusick was in the Off-Broadway cast of Extraordinary Ordinary, which ran November 29-December 18, 2010 at the Clurman Theatre on Theatre Row. Cusick was also in the American Conservatory Theater cast of Armistead Maupin's Tales of the City which began previews on May 17 and closed on July 31, 2011, after three extensions. Cusick was a standby in the original Broadway cast of Hands on a Hardbody. The production began previews on February 23, 2013, opened on March 21, 2013, and closed April 13.

Cusick played Reggie/Aaron's Future Son/Edgy Rocker Guy in the Broadway musical comedy First Date the Musical at the Longacre Theatre. The production began previews on July 9, 2013, opened on August 8, 2013, and closed on January 5, 2014.

Cusick played a Guidance Counselor/Soldier as well as Lucas understudy in the award-winning Broadway musical If/Then from July 24, 2014, to September 14, 2014.

== Wicked ==
Cusick was one of the original understudies for Fiyero in the hit 2003 musical Wicked. He performed the role of Fiyero on Broadway starting on November 25, 2003, and ending on December 22, 2003, while Norbert Leo Butz was on medical leave. Cusick was replaced by Taye Diggs, who played the role the rest of the time Butz was away. He created the role of Fiyero in the sit-down Chicago production of Wicked. He left with Elphaba's Kristy Cates and Doctor Dillamond's Timothy Britten Parker on December 10, 2006. Cusick's replacement was ensemble member and Fiyero understudy Brad Bass. Cusick reprised the role of Fiyero in the Los Angeles production of Wicked. Cusick was replaced by Derrick Williams on May 13, 2008. Williams was the original Fiyero in the national tour, and played in Chicago and New York twice.

While in the Los Angeles cast of Wicked, he was credited as appearing in the Ugly Betty episode "Something Wicked This Way Comes", whose plot revolved partly around two main characters attending the show on a date.

On June 3 he returned to Chicago to play Fiyero. He replaced Michael Seelbach who was an original Broadway cast ensemble member, and who also came to Chicago directly from the Broadway show. He remained with the production till its closure on January 25, 2009.

== Filmography ==
Film / Television
Year	Title	Role	Notes
2002	Pretty Cool	Greg (credited as Kristoffer Cusik)	Film
2004	Wicked	Unnamed Part	(Video)
2007	Ugly Betty	Fiyero	(TV Series), 1 episode: "Something Wicked This Way Comes"
2013	Test	Walt	Film
2014	Person of Interest	Terry	(TV Series), 1 episode: "Beta"
2014	The Good Wife	Sheriff	(TV Series), 1 episode: "Parallel Construction, Bitches"
2016	The Catalyst	Rob	(Short film)
2016	Vinyl	Ondine	(TV Series), 1 episode: "Yesterday Once More"
2017	Kick Me, I'm Christian	Hector	(TV Series), Pilot episode not released
2019	Elementary	Gene	(TV Series), 1 episode: "Unfriended"

== Personal life ==
Cusick traveled around the world while working on a cruise ship, and spent a year in Tokyo while working for Tokyo Disneyland. Additionally, he has lived in New York City and Chicago. Cusick is openly gay.
