= Music Theatre Wichita =

Kansas summer musical theatre

- Formation: 1972
- Type: Summer stock
- Location(s): Century II Performing Arts & Convention Center; Wichita, Kansas
- Artistic director: Brian J. Marcum
- Website: mtwichita.org

Music Theatre Wichita is a summer musical theatre, which has produced over 200 Broadway-scale productions since its founding in 1972. Founded as Music Theatre of Wichita in 1972 to provide summertime entertainment inside the 2100-seat Concert Hall of the newly built Century II Complex in downtown Wichita, Kansas, the organization has had only four artistic producers to date: founding producing director Jim Miller (1972-1979), John Holly (1980-1987), Wayne Bryan (1988-2021) and current producing artistic director Brian J. Marcum (2021–present). The organization adopted its current name and logo in May 2014.

== Theatre history ==
Music Theatre of Wichita was established in 1972 by a group of local business leaders who raised $100,000 to fund it as a community theatre and hired Jim Miller as the first director. Under Miller, the group relied on local teachers and performers. After Miller left in 1979, his assistant, John Holly, took over. Starting with an initial annual budget of $460,000, Holly shifted the company's emphasis to a more professional framework, using more Equity talent and rules. Holly left after 14 seasons to take a position with Theatre Under The Stars in Houston, and was replaced by Wayne Bryan, who had been a guest performer and director for the company.

Each summer a resident company of college-aged performers and technicians works with established professionals from Broadway and Hollywood. More than 1,000 aspiring singer-dancer-actors audition each March for the resident performing company. Five large-scale musicals are produced in-house each summer, during a 10-week period, with performances taking place from Wednesday to Sunday every other week.

In its four decades of operation, the repertoire has included a world premiere (the revised version of the collegiate musical Good News! in 1993) and regional premieres, including Honk!, for which the company recorded the first full cast album.

Sets and costumes for many of the MTWichita shows have become popular for other productions in North America.

The theatre's youth-oriented initiatives include an apprentice program, an intern program, a Teen Choir, and the Jester Awards, annually saluting excellence in high school musical theatre production in south central Kansas. Beginning in June 2009, two Jester recipients have been sent each year to New York for the National High School Musical Theater Awards (the "Jimmys").

The theatre has garnered favorable press from such theatrical writers as Peter Filichia and Robert Osborne. The theatre's current annual budget is just over three million dollars. It has received local and state awards for excellence. Music Theatre Wichita is the highest subscribed non-profit arts organization in the state of Kansas.

== Cast recordings ==
The 2001 production of Honk! by Music Theater Wichita was notable for providing the first American recording of the show.

The 1993 revised version of DeSylva, Brown and Henderson's Good News! was preserved by John Yap in a 1995 studio recording, featuring MTW cast members. Producing artistic director Wayne Bryan, who had performed the role in the 1974 Broadway revival, co-authored the new adaptation with Mark Madama. The show's new arrangements were created and conducted by Craig Barna.

Singin' in the Rain was revised at Music Theatre Wichita in 1992, with the most notable addition being an expanded version of the "Broadway Ballet". This version was recorded by John Yap for TER / Jay Records.

== Performing artists ==
Performing artists who spent summers at Music Theatre Wichita include:

- Stanley Bahorek
- Jenni Barber
- Jessica Boevers Bogart
- Matt Bogart
- Karla Burns
- Catherine Charlebois
- Kristin Chenoweth
- Kimberly Faure
- Robert Hartwell
- Tad Hilgenbrinck
- Anne Horak
- Kim Huber
- Lauren Kennedy
- Eloise Kropp
- Arthur Marks
- Shina Ann Morris
- Kelli O'Hara
- Chelsea Packard
- Ashley Park
- Josh Prince
- Darren Ritchie
- Justin Robertson
- Gabrielle Ruiz
- Nicholas Saverine
- Brian Spitulnik
- Edward Staudenmayer
- Danny Stiles
- Kristin Beth Williams
