= Chandra Lee Schwartz =

American theatre performer (born 1981)

Chandra Lee Schwartz (born August 18, 1981) is an American theatre performer, who played Glinda on the First National Tour of Wicked from Friday, 21 August 2009, through Sunday, 17 April 2011. She originally starred alongside Donna Vivino as Elphaba, who was later replaced by Jackie Burns. Schwartz recently reprised the role of Glinda in the Broadway production of Wicked beginning September 27, 2011. Her final performance was held on October 14, 2012 alongside former national tour co-star, Jackie Burns. She returned to the role of Glinda on the First National Tour, on July 29, 2014, with Emma Hunton as Elphaba. She closed the production, alongside Jennifer DiNoia as Elphaba, on March 15, 2015. She was recently cast as Annie in the upcoming world premiere of a musical adaptation of Sleepless in Seattle.

Schwartz is a graduate of the American Musical and Dramatic Academy in New York City.

As of 2024, Chandra works at a theater summer camp called 5 days of Broadway at segerstrom center for the performing arts in Costa Mesa California.

== Theatre credits ==
=== Broadway ===
- Wicked as Glinda (replacement)
- Gypsy as Agnes (2003 revival starring Bernadette Peters)

=== Off-Broadway ===
- What's That Smell: The Music of Jacob Sterling (Atlantic Theatre Company at New World Stages Stage V)

=== National Tour ===
- High School Musical as Sharpay
- Hairspray as Penny
- Wicked as Glinda
