= Suzie Mathers =

Scottish-Australian actress (born 1984)

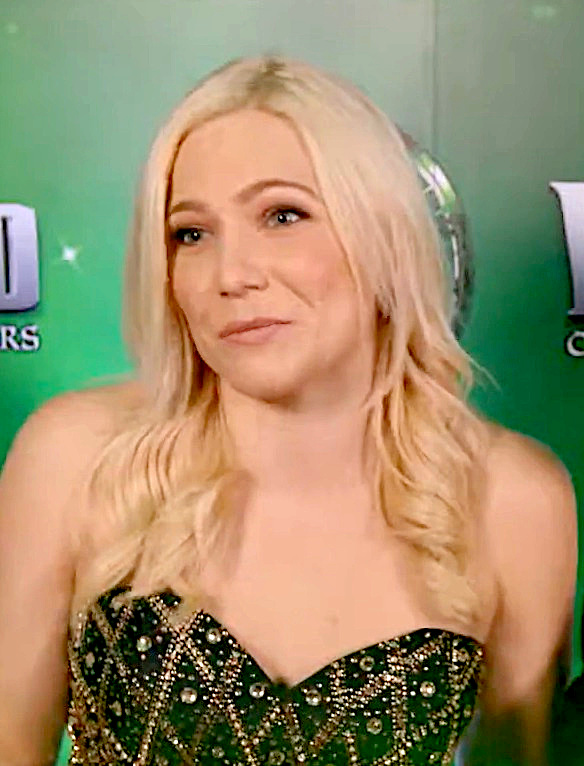
- Mathers at Wicked 10th Birthday 2016

Background information
- Born: 29 June 1984 (age 42); Aberdeen, Scotland
- Genre: Musical Theatre
- Occupations: Singer, actor
- Years active: 2008–present
- Spouse: Laura Francis (m. 2019)
- Website: www.suziemathers.com

Suzie Mathers is a Scottish-Australian actress and theatre performer best known for her role as Glinda the Good Witch in the Australian, Asian tour, and London productions of Wicked as well Sophie in the 10th Anniversary Australian tour of Mamma Mia! the Musical.

== Biography ==
Born in Aberdeen, Scotland and raised in Perth, Western Australia, Suzie received a Bachelor of Arts (Music Theatre) from the Western Australian Academy of Performing Arts (WAAPA) in 2007. In the few short years since graduating Suzie quickly made her mark in the Australian and International music theatre industry.

== Career ==
Her career in musical theater started with a spot in an amateur production of Jesus Christ Superstar. In 2007, she graduated with a degree in music theater from the Western Australian Academy of Performing Arts. While in college, she performed in various productions such as "The Good Fight" and "Annie Get Your Gun."

Originally an offstage vocal swing for the 2008 Melbourne production, Mathers was cast in Wicked straight out of drama school, and remained with the company as an ensemble member until the beginning of the Sydney season in 2009. Suzie left to play the leading role of Sophie in the 10th Anniversary Australian tour of Mamma Mia!, which toured nationally in Sydney, Melbourne, Perth & Brisbane.

After the national tour of Mamma Mia! Suzie returned to the cast of Wicked for the first Australian tour performing in Brisbane, Adelaide & Perth, in the role of the Midwife, and was also the understudy for Glinda.

Suzie officially took over the role of lead Glinda from Lucy Durack in 2015, performing in Singapore, South Korea, New Zealand and Manila to much critical acclaim. A highlight was performing to the shows composer Stephen Schwartz, twice. She has co-starred alongside various Australian theatre performers including Jemma Rix, Maggie Kirkpatrick, David Harris, Anne Wood and Gretel Scarlett as well as New Zealand actor Jay Laga'aia.

Suzie stepped down from the role of Glinda when it returned to Australia at the end of Wicked's Manila run on 9 March 2014. Though Suzie did briefly reprise the role in Melbourne while Lucy Durack took leave due to injury in May 2014.

Mathers then again reprised the role of Glinda for the Brisbane and Perth seasons of Wicked, taking over once again from Lucy Durack, who left at the end of the Sydney season due to her pregnancy. During the Brisbane season Suzie reached her 500th performance as Glinda, and is expected have performed the role over 580 times when the show closes in Perth mid 2015.

Mathers made her West End debut reprising the role of Glinda this time in the London production of Wicked at the Apollo Victoria Theatre. She performed the role at the 10th anniversary performance on 27 September 2016. Rachel Tucker and Willemijn Verkaik performed as Elphaba alongside her. She left the production on 22 July 2017.

== Stage credits ==
Professional Musical Theatre
Start year	Production	Location	Role
2008	Wicked	Melbourne	Ensemble member
2009	Mamma Mia!	Australian Tour (Sydney, Melbourne, Perth & Brisbane)	Sophie
2011	Wicked	Australian Tour (Brisbane, Adelaide & Perth)	Midwife & Glinda Understudy
2012	Wicked	Singapore & South Korea (Seoul)	Glinda
2013	Wicked	New Zealand (Auckland)	Glinda
2014	Wicked	Philippines (Manila)	Glinda
2014	Wicked	Australian Return Tour (Sydney)	Glinda (Selected shows only)
2015	Wicked	Australian Return Tour (Brisbane & Perth)	Glinda
2016	Wicked	London (West End)	Glinda
2019	Barnum	Melbourne	Jenny Lind

Other Stage Credits
Year	Production	Location	Role
2012	An Afternoon with Stephen Sondheim	Melbourne	NA
2012	Carols by Candlelight	Melbourne	NA
2014	"Hello Jerry!" The Music of Jerry Herman	Dublin	NA
2015	Cinderella	Cambridge (Cambridge Arts Theatre)	Cinderella
2018	I Wish My Life Were Like A Musical	London	NA

== Other performances ==
Suzie's other appearances include An Afternoon with Stephen Sondheim at Her Majesty's Theatre, Melbourne in 2012, both the 2011 and 2012 Rob Guest Endowment Concerts, headlining artist at the 2012 Apex Carols By Candlelight, the 2009 Helpmann Awards, the role of Edith Faulkner in the 2007 New York Music Theatre Festival production of David King and Nick Enright's The Good Fight. Suzie also guest starred in David Harris' sold-out show Time is a Traveller at the Hayes Theatre in Sydney.

She recently appeared in a one night concert, "Hello Jerry! The Music of Jerry Herman" at The National Concert Hall, Dublin featuring music from the spectacular Broadway musicals of twice Tony Award winner Jerry Herman. The concert was conducted by John Wilson (conductor) with music by The RTÉ Orchestra. The performance also featured West End's Annalene Beechey, and American musical entertainer and actress Kim Criswell.

In June 2015 Suzie returned to where her career began to help celebrate 30 years of Musical Theatre at the West Australia Academy of Performing Arts (WAAPA), performing at the WAAPA Grads Say Thanks gala concert at the Geoff Gibbs Theatre at Edith Cowan University. Suzie performed in the title role of Cinderella, for the 2015 family pantomime at Cambridge Arts Theatre.
