= Kendra Kassebaum =

American actress and singer (born 1973)

- Born: May 12, 1973 (age 53); St. Louis, Missouri, U.S.
- Education: Southwest Missouri State University (BFA)
- Occupations: Actress; singer

Kendra Kassebaum (born May 12, 1973) is an American actress and singer, who has performed in many different musicals (both Broadway and non-Broadway), and is perhaps best remembered for playing the role of Glinda in the first national tour, Broadway, and San Francisco casts of the blockbuster musical Wicked.

== Early life ==
Kassebaum was born on May 12, 1973, in St Louis, Missouri. Her parents are Susie and Dave Kassebaum, and she has one brother, Nicholas. Kendra went to St. Martin of Tours Catholic Elementary School for grades kindergarten to eighth grade. Kendra pursued sports and dancing and did not begin performing until she entered Notre Dame High School. She graduated from high school in 1991. On her graduation day, she received the "Best Actress" award.

== Career ==
Kassebaum then attended Southwest Missouri State University (now Missouri State University), where she received her B.F.A. in Performing Arts. Afterwards, she toured with Grease briefly before moving to New York City. She received her Equity card while on a regional tour of "A Chorus Line" at the Gateway Playhouse and began to pursue acting, but she also earned money by working as a nanny.

Kassebaum debuted on Broadway on September 5, 2000 in Rent (as Mark's Mom, understudying Maureen Johnson). She was also in the 2004 Broadway revival of Assassins, and has toured with Grease and A Chorus Line. She has performed in numerous regional shows.

=== Wicked and other Pre-Come from Away projects ===
Kassebaum originated the role of "Glinda" in the first national tour of Wicked. She was nominated for a Helen Hayes Award for Best Actress in a Regional Performance for her role in Wicked, but lost to then co-star Stephanie J. Block. Kassebaum left the tour in September 2006 after spending a year and a half in the role and was replaced by Megan Hilty.

Kassebaum played "Amy" in the Seattle production of the Stephen Sondheim musical Company at the 5th Avenue Theatre, starring alongside actor Hugh Panaro. The production ran from October 17, 2006 through November 5, 2006.

On January 9, 2007, Kassebaum reprised her role as Glinda in the Broadway production of Wicked, replacing Kate Reinders, alongside her former co-stars Julia Murney, Sebastian Arcelus, David Garrison, and Logan Lipton. She and co-star Julia Murney had their final performances with the Broadway company on October 7, 2007. Kassebaum was replaced by Annaleigh Ashford.

Kassebaum appeared as Lorraine in the Adam Bock play The Receptionist with former Wicked co-star, Jayne Houdyshell. The show ran Off-Broadway at stage 1 of the Manhattan Theater Club. The Receptionist opened October 30, 2007, and closed on December 30, 2007.

On May 13, 2008, Kassebaum once again returned to the role of Glinda in the Broadway company of Wicked where she starred alongside former Wicked tour co-star Stephanie J. Block and then Kerry Ellis. She ended her run on November 9, 2008 and was succeeded by former Broadway Glinda standby Alli Mauzey.

Kassebaum reprised the role of Glinda in the San Francisco production of Wicked originally alongside Teal Wicks, and then Eden Espinosa as Elphaba. The production began performances January 27, 2009, with an opening night of February 6, 2009, at the Orpheum Theatre. She left the production on June 26, 2010 and was once again succeeded by Alli Mauzey. The San Francisco production gave its final bow on September 5, 2010.

She was seen as the Fairy Godmother in Seattle's 5th Avenue Theatre production of Cinderella, which ran from November 25 - to December 31, 2011. The following year, she appeared as Jovie in the theatre's production of Elf: The Musical.

Kassebaum played the role of Sam in the musical Leap of Faith, opposite Brooke Shields and Raul Esparza at the Ahmanson Theatre, for an out-of-town tryout running from September 11 through October 24, 2010. The show then transferred to Broadway at the St. James Theatre in April 2012.

Kassebaum played the role of Diana Goodman in Next to Normal at the Arizona Theatre Company in Tucson, Arizona from September 15 through October 6, 2012, in Phoenix, Arizona from October 11 to October 28, 2012, and in San Jose from January 10, 2013 to February 3. This production was a joint production with the San Jose Repertory Theatre.

In October 2013, Kassebaum co-starred in Seattle's now-defunct Balagan Theatre production of Carrie: The Musical as high school physical education teacher Ms. Gardener, a chimera of Ms. Desjardin in the original novel, and Miss Collins in the original film adaptation. The show was staged at the Moore Theatre, and also included Alice Ripley as Margaret White and Keaton Whittaker as the titular teenager.

=== Come from Away ===
She next appeared as Janice in the new musical Come from Away, which opened on Broadway at the Gerald Schoenfeld Theatre in February 2017, following pre-Broadway engagements in Washington, D.C. at the Ford's Theatre and Toronto at the Royal Alexandra Theatre. She departed the company on August 27, 2017.

Kassebaum then starred in the roles of Mother and Donna Sheridan in the 5th Avenue Theatre's productions of Ragtime and Mamma Mia!, respectively.
