= Wicked (musical) =

Musical by Stephen Schwartz and Winnie Holzman

- The Untold Story of the Witches of Oz
- Official poster of the original San Francisco production
- Music: Stephen Schwartz
- Lyrics: Stephen Schwartz
- Book: Winnie Holzman
- Basis: Wicked by Gregory Maguire
- Premiere: May 28, 2003: Curran Theatre, San Francisco
- Productions: 2003 San Francisco; 2003 Broadway; 2005 1st U.S. tour 2006 West End; 2009 2nd U.S. tour 2013 1st UK/Ireland tour 2017 2nd UK/Ireland tour 2023 3rd UK/Ireland Tour
- Awards: Drama Desk Awards for Outstanding Musical; Outstanding Lyrics; Outstanding Book

Wicked (known in full as Wicked: The Untold Story of the Witches of Oz) is a musical with music and lyrics by Stephen Schwartz and a book by Winnie Holzman. It is loosely based on the 1995 novel of the same name by Gregory Maguire, a reimagining of the 1900 novel The Wonderful Wizard of Oz by L. Frank Baum and its 1939 film adaptation. Set in the Land of Oz before and after Dorothy Gale's arrival from Kansas, the musical explores the complex relationship between Elphaba Thropp and Glinda Upland – the future Wicked Witch of the West and Glinda the Good — as they are tested by their contrasting perspectives, shared love interest, and reactions to the Wizard's corrupt rule, culminating in Elphaba's tragic fall.

Produced by Universal Stage Productions with producers Marc Platt, Jon B. Platt and David Stone, director Joe Mantello and choreographer Wayne Cilento, the original production of Wicked premiered on Broadway at the Gershwin Theatre in October 2003, after completing pre-Broadway tryouts at San Francisco's Curran Theatre in May and June of that year. Its original stars included Idina Menzel as Elphaba, Kristin Chenoweth as Glinda, Norbert Leo Butz as Fiyero, and Joel Grey as the Wizard. Despite mixed reviews, the production won three Tony Awards and seven Drama Desk Awards, while its original cast album received a Grammy Award.

Long-running productions of Wicked include a West End production at the Apollo Victoria Theatre that has played over 7,407 performances, as well as multiple North American tours since 2005. The musical has broken several weekly box-office records around the world; in January 2011, the Broadway, London, and North American touring productions simultaneously broke their records for the highest weekly gross. In the final week of 2024, the Broadway production became the first to earn over US$5 million in a single week. Wicked surpassed $1 billion in total Broadway revenue in 2016, joining The Phantom of the Opera and The Lion King as the only shows to do so. In 2017, it surpassed The Phantom of the Opera to become Broadway's second-highest grossing musical as of 2026.

A two-part film adaptation was directed by Jon M. Chu and starred Cynthia Erivo as Elphaba, Ariana Grande as Glinda, Jonathan Bailey as Fiyero, and Jeff Goldblum as the Wizard. The first part, featuring extended cameos by Menzel and Chenoweth, was released on November 22, 2024 and nominated for the Academy Award for Best Picture among numerous other accolades. The second part, Wicked: For Good, was released on November 21, 2025.

== Inception and development ==
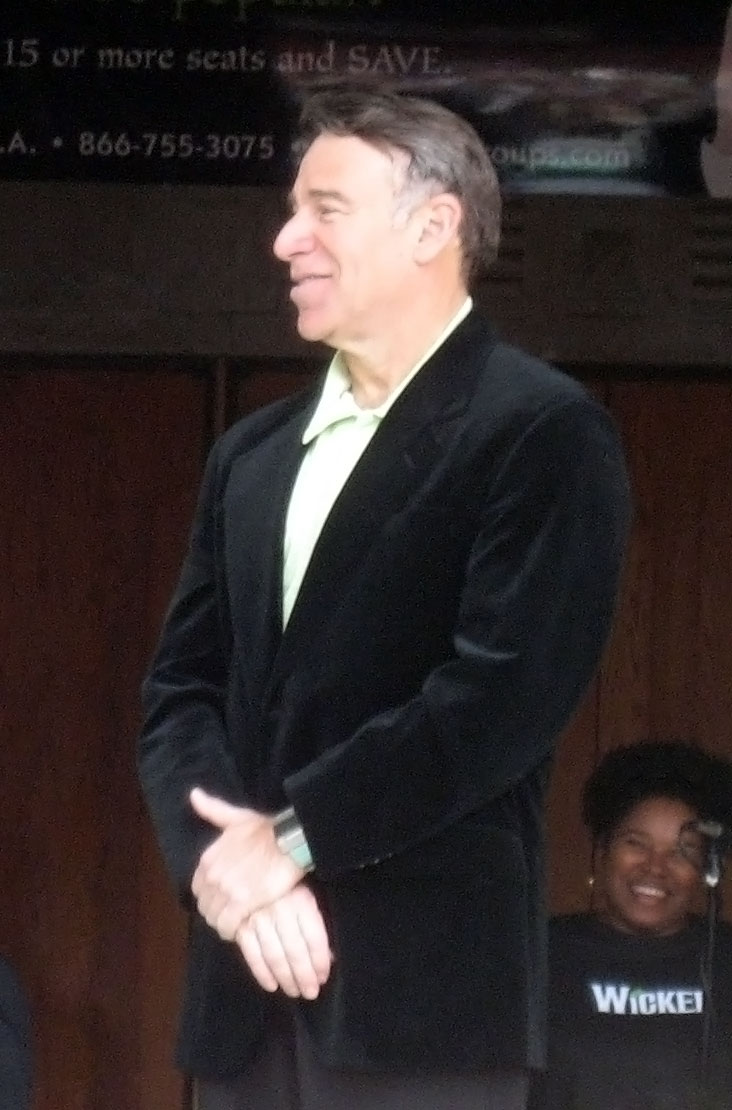
Wicked composer and lyricist Stephen Schwartz

Composer and lyricist Stephen Schwartz discovered Gregory Maguire's 1995 novel Wicked: The Life and Times of the Wicked Witch of the West while on vacation and saw its potential for a dramatic adaptation. However, Maguire had released the rights to Universal Pictures, which had planned to develop a live-action feature film. In 1998, Schwartz persuaded Maguire to release the rights to a stage production while also making what Schwartz himself called an "impassioned plea" to Universal producer Marc Platt to realize Schwartz's own intended adaptation. Persuaded, Platt signed on as joint producer of the project with Universal and David Stone.

The novel, described as a political, social, and ethical commentary on the nature of good and evil, takes place in the Land of Oz, in the years surrounding Dorothy's arrival. The story centers on Elphaba, a misunderstood, smart, and fiery girl with emerald-green skin, who grows up to become the Wicked Witch of the West, and Galinda, the beautiful, blonde, popular girl who grows up to become Glinda the Good. The story presents events, characters, and situations adapted from L. Frank Baum's The Wonderful Wizard of Oz (1900) and its 1939 film adaptation. The novel addresses some serious and dark adult themes, including sexual assault, political unrest, infidelity, racism and the role of religion in society. It prompts the reader to think about what it really is to be "Wicked", and whether good intentions with bad results are the same as bad intentions with bad results. Schwartz considered how best to condense the novel's dense and complicated plot into a sensible script. To this end, he collaborated with writer Winnie Holzman to develop the outline of the plot over the course of a year, while meeting with producer Marc Platt to refine the structural outline of the show, creating an original stage piece rather than a strict adaptation of Maguire's work.

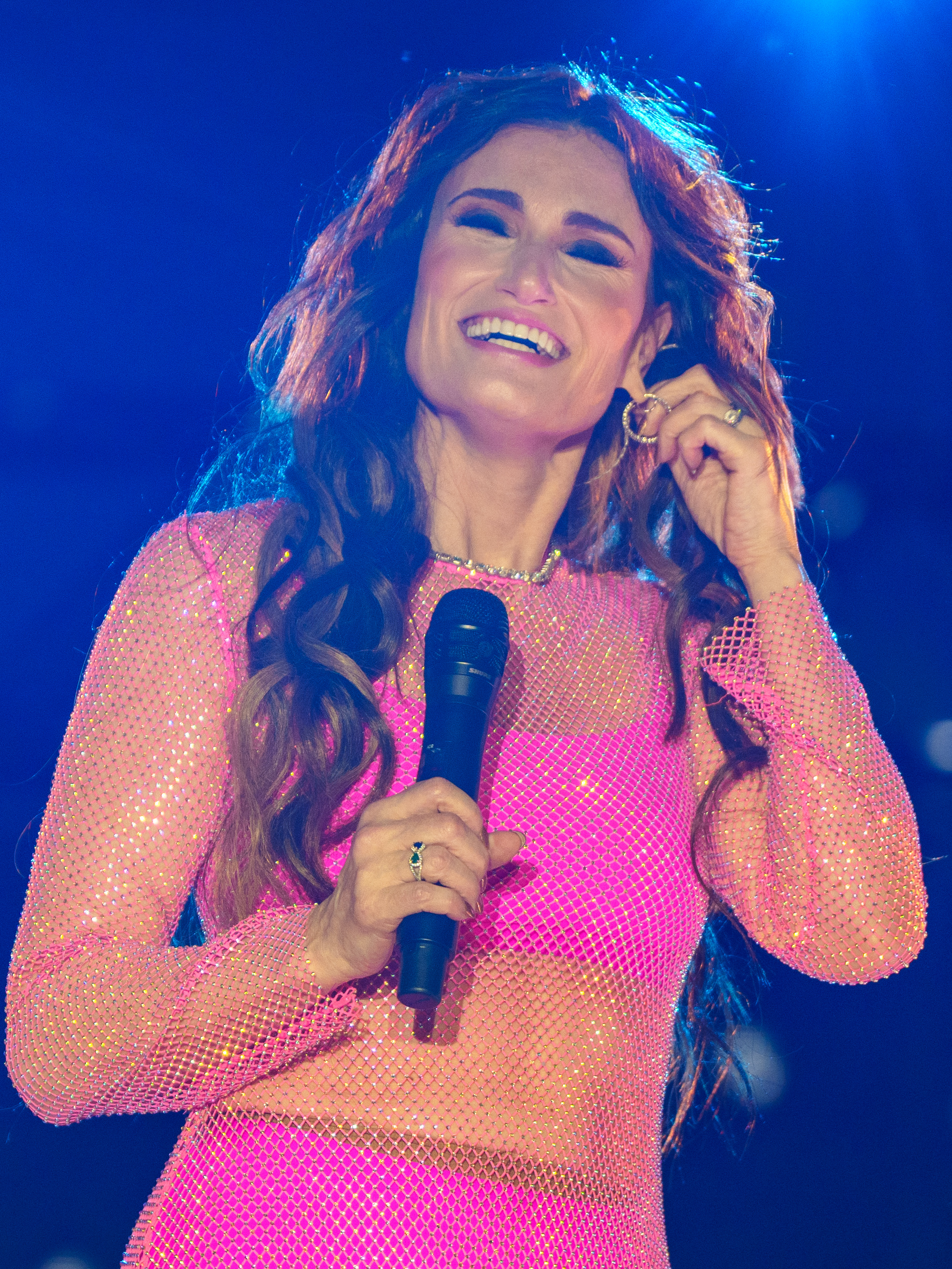
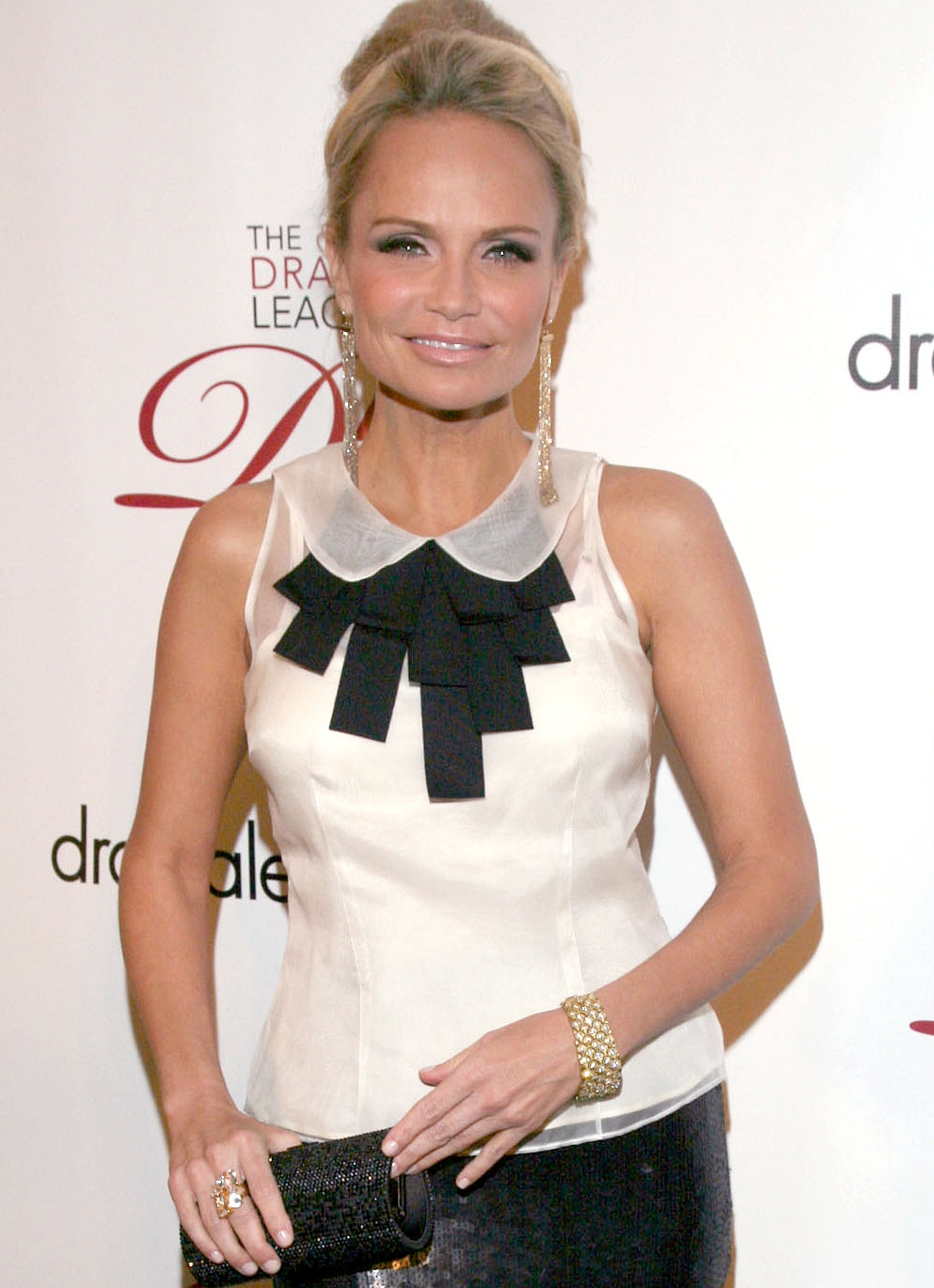
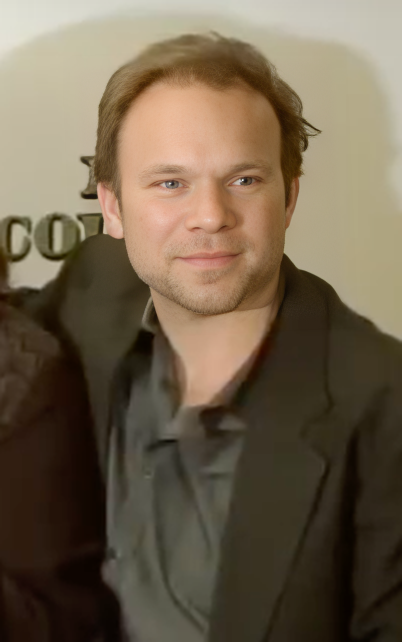
The original Broadway cast includes (L:R) Idina Menzel as Elphaba, Kristin Chenoweth as Glinda, and Norbert Leo Butz as Fiyero.

While the draft followed Maguire's idea of retelling the story of the 1939 film from the perspective of its main villain, the storyline of the stage adaptation "goes far afield" from the novel. Holzman observed in an interview with Playbill that: "It was [Maguire's] brilliant idea to take this hated figure and tell things from her point of view, and to have the two witches be roommates in college, but the way in which their friendship develops—and really the whole plot—is different onstage." Schwartz justified the deviation, saying: "Primarily we were interested in the relationship between Galinda—who becomes Glinda—and Elphaba... the friendship of these two women and how their characters lead them to completely different destinies." Other major plot modifications include Fiyero's appearance as the Scarecrow, Elphaba's survival at the end, Nessarose using a wheelchair instead of being born without arms, Boq having a continuing love interest for Glinda and eventually becoming the Tin Woodman instead of Nick Chopper, cutting Elphaba's years in the Vinkus, the deletion of Liir's birth, Fiyero not having a wife and children, Doctor Dillamond being fired instead of being murdered, and Madame Morrible going to prison instead of dying.

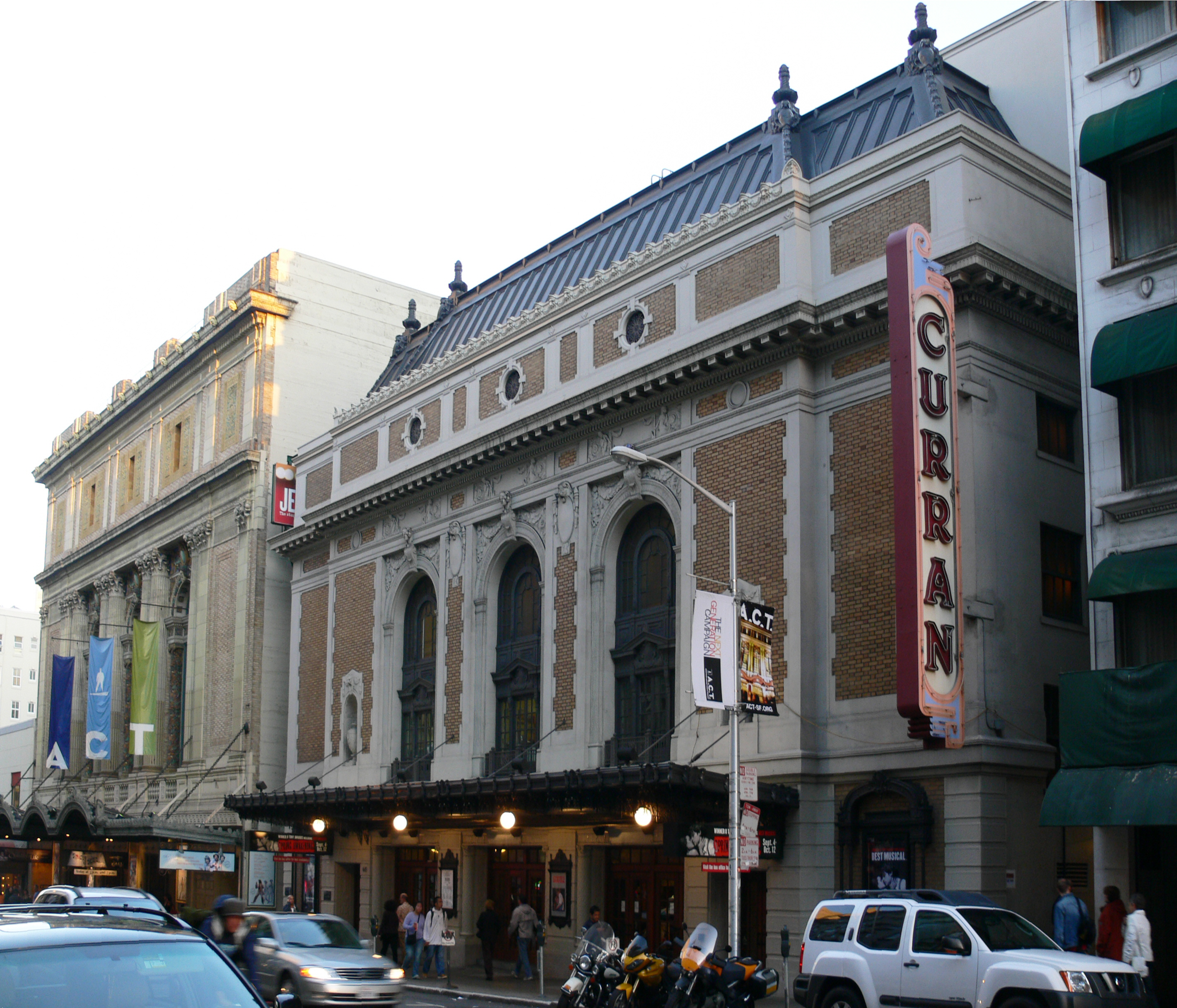
The Curran Theatre in San Francisco, where Wicked made its debut

The book, lyrics, and score for the musical were developed through a series of readings. In these developmental workshops, Kristin Chenoweth, the actress whom Schwartz had in mind while writing the character, joined the project as Glinda. Stephanie J. Block played Elphaba in the workshops (she played Elphaba in the first national tour and later as a Broadway cast replacement) before Idina Menzel was cast in the role in late 2002. Earlier that year, the creators recruited New York producer Stone, who began planning the Broadway production. Joe Mantello was engaged as director and Wayne Cilento as choreographer, while designer Eugene Lee created the set and visual style for the production inspired by W. W. Denslow's original illustrations for Baum's novels and Maguire's concept of the story being told through a giant clock. Costume designer Susan Hilferty created a "twisted Edwardian" style in building more than 200 costumes, while lighting designer Kenneth Posner used more than 800 lights to give each of the 54 distinct scenes and locations "its own mood". By April 2003, the show was in rehearsals.

Following the out-of-town tryout in San Francisco in May and June 2003, which received mixed critical reception, the creative team made extensive changes before its transfer to Broadway. Holzman recalled:

Stephen [Schwartz] wisely had insisted on having three months to rewrite in-between the time we closed in San Francisco and when we were to go back into rehearsals in New York. That was crucial; that was the thing that made the biggest difference in the life of the show. That time is what made the show work.

Elements of the book were rewritten, while several songs underwent minor changes. "Which Way is the Party?", the introductory song to the character Fiyero, was replaced by "Dancing Through Life". Concern existed that Menzel's Elphaba "got a little overshadowed" by Chenoweth's Glinda, with San Francisco Chronicle critic Robert Hurwitt writing, "Menzel's brightly intense Elphaba the Wicked Witch [needs] a chance of holding her own alongside Chenoweth's gloriously, insidiously bubbly Glinda." As a result, the creative team set about making Elphaba "more prominent". In making the Broadway revisions, Schwartz recalled, "It was clear there was work to be done and revisions to be made in the book and the score. The critical community was, frankly, very helpful to us."

== Synopsis ==
=== Act One ===
The citizens of Oz are celebrating the death of the Wicked Witch of the West. Glinda the Good Witch appears and reminisces about their past, beginning with the troubled childhood of the Witch (born Elphaba Thropp) after her mother had an affair and her father, the Governor of Munchkinland, disowned her when she was born with green skin ("No One Mourns the Wicked").

Flashing back many years earlier, Elphaba arrives at Shiz University with her younger paraplegic sister Nessarose, where she is ostracized for her green skin and sarcastic personality ("Dear Old Shiz"). The school's headmistress, Madame Morrible, assigns Elphaba to room with the popular Galinda Upland. Recognizing Elphaba's magical potential, Morrible decides to privately tutor Elphaba in sorcery ("The Wizard and I"), making Galinda intensely jealous. The two girls soon come to loathe each other ("What Is This Feeling?"). Meanwhile, Dr. Dillamond, the only animal professor at Shiz, informs Elphaba of a conspiracy to stop all animals from speaking ("Something Bad").

A roguish prince, Fiyero, begins attending Shiz and arranges a party for his fellow students. Galinda becomes immediately enamored with him, and convinces her admirer, the Munchkin Boq, to take Nessarose to the party instead so that she can go with Fiyero. At Nessarose's urging, Elphaba asks Morrible to begin teaching Galinda sorcery. When Elphaba is mocked at the party for wearing an ugly hat Galinda gave her as a practical joke, Galinda has a change of heart and decides to dance with Elphaba ("Dancing Through Life"). In their room, the girls finally bond and Galinda gives Elphaba a makeover ("Popular"). The next day, Dillamond tells the class he has been dismissed. His human replacement showcases a cage, a new invention in Oz designed to stop animals from speaking. Elphaba, furious, frees the lion cub imprisoned within it and escapes with Fiyero. They share a private moment, but Elphaba laments that Fiyero has chosen Galinda ("I'm Not That Girl").

Morrible tells Elphaba that the Wizard of Oz wants to meet her, and she goes with Galinda, who changes her name to Glinda in honor of Dillamond (who mispronounced her name as such), to the Emerald City ("One Short Day"). The two meet the Wizard and are surprised to discover his mortal nature ("A Sentimental Man"). Morrible appears and announces she is the Wizard's new press secretary. After being tricked into enchanting the Wizard's monkey servants to painfully sprout wings, Elphaba deduces that the Wizard is behind the suppression of animals and is a fraud who uses parlor tricks and lies to stay in power. Elphaba flees his chambers, declaring against Glinda's wishes that she must do what is right. Though empathetic, Glinda refuses to leave with Elphaba, and the two friends bid farewell before Elphaba enchants a broom to fly away from the Emerald City, vowing to fight the Wizard with all of her power ("Defying Gravity").

=== Act Two ===
Years later, Elphaba has become known as the Wicked Witch of the West for her opposition to the Wizard's regime, while Glinda has been positioned by Madame Morrible as the Wizard's spokesperson. Fiyero, now Captain of the Wizard's Guard and unwitting fiancé to Glinda, hopes to find Elphaba ("Thank Goodness").

Elphaba visits Nessarose, who is now the governor of Munchkinland following their father's death and has removed the Munchkins' few rights to prevent Boq from leaving her. Feeling guilty, Elphaba enchants Nessa's silver shoes to allow her to walk, but Boq takes this as proof that Nessarose no longer needs him and attempts to leave her for Glinda. An infuriated Nessarose attempts to cast a love spell on him, but pronounces the incantation wrong and shrinks his heart instead. Elphaba tries to save him, but can only transform him into a tin man who does not need a heart to live ("The Wicked Witch of the East"). Boq flees as Nessarose blames Elphaba.

Elphaba returns to the Emerald City to free the Wizard's monkey servants, but the Wizard discovers her. He once again tries to convince Elphaba to work with him, explaining he is an ordinary man who became revered by the citizens of Oz ("Wonderful"), and voluntarily frees the monkeys. Elphaba is won over until she discovers a caged Dillamond, who has lost the ability to speak, and vows to continue her fight against the Wizard. Fiyero helps Elphaba escape and decides to leave with her. Glinda is heartbroken and spitefully suggests spreading a rumor that Nessarose is in danger to lure Elphaba out of hiding, before privately lamenting that Fiyero always loved Elphaba ("I'm Not That Girl (Reprise)"). Unbeknownst to Glinda, Morrible and the Wizard decide a mere rumor would not fool Elphaba, and Morrible proposes "a change in the weather."

Hidden in the forest, Elphaba and Fiyero proclaim their love to each other ("As Long as You're Mine"), but their moment is shattered when Elphaba senses that Nessarose is in danger. She rushes back to Munchkinland to find that a house has fallen from a tornado and crushed her sister to death. Elphaba is distraught and furious that Glinda has given Nessarose's enchanted shoes to the house's occupant, Dorothy Gale, and the two get into a physical fight that the Wizard's guards eventually break up. Fiyero arrives and allows Elphaba to escape, but the guards arrest and torture him for her whereabouts. At Kiamo Ko castle, Elphaba casts a spell to try to save Fiyero; presuming him dead, she laments that she will never be seen as good and finally embraces her reputation as the Wicked Witch of the West ("No Good Deed").

As the Citizens of Oz declare war on Elphaba ("March of the Witch Hunters"), Glinda realizes that Morrible summoned the tornado that killed Nessarose and is horrified, but Morrible reminds her that she has been complicit in all of Morrible and the Wizard's plans to further her own goal of becoming a powerful figure in Oz. Meanwhile, Elphaba, crazed with grief, has captured Dorothy to try to obtain Nessarose's shoes. Glinda arrives to warn Elphaba of her danger. Elphaba accepts that she must surrender, and the two friends embrace for the last time before sharing a tearful goodbye ("For Good"). Glinda watches from the shadows as Dorothy throws a bucket of water on Elphaba, apparently melting her and leaving only her hat and a bottle of Green Elixir that had belonged to her mother.

Glinda confronts the Wizard with the elixir, which he recognizes as his own; he was the man Elphaba's mother had an affair with and thus her biological father. The Wizard leaves Oz at Glinda's orders, leaving her in charge, and she arrests Morrible for her role in Nessarose's death. Meanwhile, Fiyero (now a Scarecrow as the result of Elphaba's spell) arrives at Kiamo Ko, where Elphaba emerges from a trap door, having faked her death. Elphaba and Fiyero depart Oz together, as Glinda informs everyone that the Wicked Witch is dead before reluctantly joining Oz in celebrating ("Finale").

== Casts ==
=== Original casts ===
Character	San Francisco	Broadway	First US tour	Chicago	West End	Los Angeles	Melbourne	San Francisco	Second US tour	Australian tour	First UK/Ireland tour	International tour
Character	2003		2005		2006	2007	2008	2009	2009	2011	2013	2016
Elphaba	Idina Menzel	Idina Menzel	Stephanie J. Block	Ana Gasteyer	Idina Menzel	Eden Espinosa	Amanda Harrison	Teal Wicks	Marcie Dodd	Jemma Rix	Nikki Davis-Jones	Jacqueline Hughes
Glinda	Kristin Chenoweth	Kristin Chenoweth	Kendra Kassebaum	Kate Reinders	Helen Dallimore	Megan Hilty	Lucy Durack	Kendra Kassebaum	Heléne Yorke	Lucy Durack	Emily Tierney	Carly Anderson
Fiyero	Norbert Leo Butz	Norbert Leo Butz	Derrick Williams	Kristoffer Cusick	Adam Garcia	Kristoffer Cusick	Rob Mills	Nicolas Dromard	Colin Donnell	David Harris	Liam Doyle	Bradley Jaden
Madame Morrible	Carole Shelley	Carole Shelley	Carol Kane	Rondi Reed	Miriam Margolyes	Carol Kane	Maggie Kirkpatrick	Carol Kane	Marilyn Caskey	Maggie Kirkpatrick	Marilyn Cutts	Kim Ismay
Nessarose	Michelle Federer	Michelle Federer	Jenna Leigh Green	Heidi Kettenring	Katie Rowley Jones	Jenna Leigh Green	Penny McNamee	Deedee Magno Hall	Kristine Reese	Elisa Colla	Carina Gillespie	Emily Shaw
Boq	Kirk McDonald	Christopher Fitzgerald	Logan Lipton	Telly Leung	James Gillan	Adam Wylie	Anthony Callea	Eddy Rioseco	Ted Ely	James Smith	George Ure	Iddon Jones
The Wonderful Wizard of Oz	Robert Morse	Joel Grey	David Garrison	Gene Weygandt	Nigel Planer	John Rubinstein	Rob Guest	David Garrison	Tom McGowan	Bert Newton	Dale Rapley	Steven Pinder
Doctor Dillamond	John Horton	William Youmans	Timothy Britten Parker	Steven Skybell	Martin Ball	Timothy Britten Parker	Rodney Dobson	Tom Flynn	David De Vries	Rodney Dobson	Dale Rapley	Steven Pinder

=== Notable replacements ===
==== Broadway (2003–present) ====
- Elphaba: Shoshana Bean, Eden Espinosa, Ana Gasteyer, Julia Murney, Stephanie J. Block, Kerry Ellis, Marcie Dodd, Nicole Parker, Dee Roscioli, Mandy Gonzalez, Teal Wicks, Jackie Burns, Willemijn Verkaik, Lindsay Mendez, Caroline Bowman, Rachel Tucker, Jennifer DiNoia, Jessica Vosk, Hannah Corneau, Lindsay Pearce, Talia Suskauer, Alyssa Fox, Mary Kate Morrissey, Lencia Kebede
- Glinda: Jennifer Laura Thompson, Megan Hilty, Kate Reinders, Kendra Kassebaum, Annaleigh Ashford, Alli Mauzey, Erin Mackey, Katie Rose Clarke, Chandra Lee Schwartz, Jenni Barber, Kara Lindsay, Carrie St. Louis, Amanda Jane Cooper, Ginna Claire Mason, McKenzie Kurtz, Alexandra Socha, Allie Trimm
- Fiyero: Kristoffer Cusick, Taye Diggs, Joey McIntyre, Sebastian Arcelus, Aaron Tveit, Kevin Kern, Andy Karl, Kyle Dean Massey, Richard H. Blake, Derek Klena, Justin Guarini, Ashley Parker Angel, Curt Hansen, Ryan McCartan, Jordan Litz
- The Wonderful Wizard of Oz: Sean McCourt, George Hearn, Ben Vereen, David Garrison, Lenny Wolpe, P. J. Benjamin, Tom McGowan, Fred Applegate, Peter Scolari, Kevin Chamberlin, Michael McCormick, Cleavant Derricks, John Dossett, Brad Oscar
- Madame Morrible: Rue McClanahan, Carol Kane, Jayne Houdyshell, Miriam Margolyes, Rondi Reed, Mary Testa, Michele Lee, Judy Kaye, Sheryl Lee Ralph, Isabel Keating, Nancy Opel, Alexandra Billings, Michele Pawk, Donna McKechnie
- Nessarose: Jenna Leigh Green, Catherine Charlebois, Kelli Barrett, Arielle Jacobs, Gizel Jiménez
- Boq: Randy Harrison, Robb Sapp, Alex Brightman, Etai Benson, Taylor Trensch, Robin de Jesús
- Doctor Dillamond: Sean McCourt, Steven Skybell, Timothy Britten Parker, K. Todd Freeman, Michael Genet, Martin Moran, Jamie Jackson, Clifton Davis

==== 1st US National Tour (2005–2015) ====
- Elphaba: Shoshana Bean, Eden Espinosa, Julia Murney, Victoria Matlock, Carmen Cusack, Donna Vivino, Jackie Burns, Dee Roscioli, Nicole Parker, Alison Luff, Emma Hunton, Jennifer DiNoia
- Glinda: Megan Hilty, Katie Rose Clarke, Chandra Lee Schwartz, Amanda Jane Cooper, Alli Mauzey, Patti Murin, Jenn Gambatese, Gina Beck
- Fiyero: Kristoffer Cusick, Sebastian Arcelus, Richard H. Blake, Kyle Dean Massey
- The Wonderful Wizard of Oz: Lee Wilkof, Lenny Wolpe, P. J. Benjamin, Stuart Zagnit, Fred Applegate
- Madame Morrible: Carole Shelley, Alma Cuervo, Myra Lucretia Taylor, Kim Zimmer, Alison Fraser
- Nessarose: Deedee Magno Hall

==== West End (2006–present) ====
- Elphaba: Kerry Ellis, Alexia Khadime, Rachel Tucker, Louise Dearman, Willemijn Verkaik, Jennifer DiNoia, Emma Hatton, Alice Fearn, Lucie Jones, Emma Kingston
- Glinda: Dianne Pilkington, Louise Dearman, Gina Beck, Savannah Stevenson, Suzie Mathers, Sophie Evans, Lucy St. Louis, Zizi Strallen
- Fiyero: Oliver Tompsett, Lee Mead, Mark Evans, Matt Willis, Ben Freeman, Oliver Savile, Bradley Jaden, David Witts, Alistair Brammer, Jordan Litz
- The Wonderful Wizard of Oz: Nigel Planer, Desmond Barrit, Clive Carter, Sam Kelly, Tom McGowan, Mark Curry, Martin Ball, Andy Hockley, Gary Wilmot, Michael Fenton Stevens, Michael Matus
- Madame Morrible: Miriam Margolyes, Susie Blake, Harriet Thorpe, Julie Legrand, Louise Plowright, Liza Sadovy, Anita Dobson, Kim Ismay, Sophie-Louise Dann
- Nessarose: Caroline Keiff, Natalie Anderson
- Doctor Dillamond: Paul Clarkson, Steven Pinder, Chris Jarman

==== Melbourne/Australian tour (2008–2015) ====
- Elphaba: Jemma Rix, Pippa Grandison
- Glinda: Suzie Mathers
- Fiyero: David Harris
- The Wonderful Wizard of Oz: Bert Newton, Reg Livermore, Simon Gallaher
- Madame Morrible: Geraldine Turner

==== 2nd US National Tour (2009–present) ====
- Elphaba: Vicki Noon, Jennifer DiNoia, Alyssa Fox, Jessica Vosk, Jackie Burns, Mary Kate Morrissey, Talia Suskauer, Lauren Samuels
- Glinda: Jeanna de Waal, Kara Lindsay, Carrie St. Louis, Amanda Jane Cooper, Ginna Claire Mason, Erin Mackey
- Fiyero: Ashley Parker Angel
- The Wonderful Wizard of Oz: John Bolton, Cleavant Derricks, Fred Applegate, Paul Kreppel, Don Amendolia, Stuart Zagnit
- Madame Morrible: Judy Kaye, Isabel Keating, Alma Cuervo, Natalie Venetia Belcon
- Nessarose: Catherine Charlebois

==== 1st UK/Ireland tour (2013–2015) ====
- Elphaba: Ashleigh Gray
- The Wonderful Wizard of Oz/Doctor Dillamond: Steven Pinder

== Musical numbers ==
Act I

- "No One Mourns the Wicked" – Glinda and Citizens of Oz
- "Dear Old Shiz" – Students and Glinda
- "The Wizard and I" – Madame Morrible and Elphaba
- "What Is This Feeling?" – Glinda, Elphaba and Students
- "Something Bad" – Doctor Dillamond and Elphaba
- "Dancing Through Life" – Fiyero, Glinda, Boq, Nessarose, Elphaba and Students
- "Popular" – Glinda
- "I'm Not That Girl" – Elphaba
- "One Short Day" – Elphaba, Glinda and Ozians
- "A Sentimental Man" – The Wizard
- "Defying Gravity" – Elphaba, Glinda, Madame Morrible and Ozians

Act II

- "No One Mourns the Wicked" (Reprise) – Ensemble
- "Thank Goodness" – Glinda, Madame Morrible and Citizens of Oz
- "The Wicked Witch of the East" – Elphaba, Nessarose and Boq (Note: "The Wicked Witch of the East" is the only major piece not to be featured on the cast recording.)
- "Wonderful" – The Wizard and Elphaba
- "I'm Not That Girl" (Reprise) – Glinda
- "As Long as You're Mine" – Elphaba and Fiyero
- "No Good Deed" – Elphaba
- "March of the Witch Hunters" – Boq and Ozians
- "For Good" – Elphaba and Glinda
- "Finale" – Glinda, Elphaba and Ozians

== Music and recordings ==
=== Music analysis ===
The Wicked opening
The first 15 bars of the opening; note the identical chord progression to "As Long as You're Mine"

The score of Wicked is heavily thematic, bearing in some senses more resemblance to an opera than a traditional musical score. While many musical scores employ new motifs and melodies for each song with little overlap, Schwartz integrated a handful of leitmotifs throughout the production. Some of these motifs indicate irony—for example, when Glinda presents Elphaba with a "ghastly" hat in "Dancing Through Life", the score reprises a theme from "What Is This Feeling?" a few scenes earlier.

Two musical themes in Wicked run throughout the score. Although Schwartz rarely reuses motifs or melodies from earlier works, the first—Elphaba's theme—came from The Survival of St. Joan, on which he worked as musical director. "I always liked this tune a lot and I never could figure out what to do with it," he remarked in an interview in 2004. The chord progression that he first penned in 1971 became a major theme of the show's orchestration. By changing the instruments that carry the motif in each instance, Schwartz enables the same melody to convey different moods. In the overture, the tune is carried by the orchestra's brass section, with heavy percussion. The result is, in Schwartz' own words, "like a giant shadow terrorizing you." When played by the piano with some electric bass in "As Long as You're Mine", however, the same chord progression becomes the basis for a romantic duet. And with new lyrics and an altered bridge, the theme forms the core of the song "No One Mourns the Wicked" and its reprises.

Schwartz uses the "Unlimited" theme as the second major motif running through the score. Although not included as a titled song, the theme appears as an interlude in several of the musical numbers. In a tribute to Harold Arlen, who wrote the score for the 1939 film adaptation, the "Unlimited" melody incorporates the first seven notes of the song "Over the Rainbow." Schwartz included it as an inside joke:

According to copyright law, when you get to the eighth note, then people can come and say, 'Oh you stole our tune.' And of course obviously it's also disguised in that it's completely different rhythmically. And it's also harmonized completely differently.... It's over a different chord and so on, but still it's the first seven notes of 'Somewhere Over the Rainbow'.

Schwartz further obscured the motif's origin by setting it in a minor key in most instances. This also creates contrast in the songs in which it forms a part, for example in "Defying Gravity", which is written primarily in the key of D-flat major. In the song "The Wicked Witch of the East", however, when Elphaba finally uses her powers to let her sister walk, the "Unlimited" theme is played in a major key.

=== Recordings ===
A cast recording of the original Broadway production was released on December 16, 2003, by Universal Music. All of the songs featured on stage are present on the recording with the exception of "The Wizard and I (Reprise)", "A Sentimental Man (Reprise)" and "The Wicked Witch of the East". The short reprise of "No One Mourns the Wicked" that opens Act II is attached to the beginning of "Thank Goodness". The music was arranged by Stephen Oremus, who was also the conductor and musical director, and James Lynn Abbott, with orchestrations by William David Brohn. The recording received the Grammy Award for Best Musical Show Album in 2005 and was certified platinum by the RIAA on November 30, 2006. The album was certified double platinum on November 8, 2010. A fifth-anniversary special edition of the original Broadway cast recording was released on October 28, 2008, with a bonus CD including tracks from the Japanese and German cast recordings, "Making Good"—a song later replaced by "The Wizard and I"—sung by Stephanie J. Block with Schwartz at the piano, "I'm Not That Girl" by Kerry Ellis (featuring Brian May on guitar), Menzel's dance mix of "Defying Gravity" and "For Good" sung by LeAnn Rimes and Delta Goodrem.

A German recording of the Stuttgart production was released on December 7, 2007, featuring a track listing and arrangements identical to those of the Broadway recording. The Japanese cast recording was released on July 23, 2008, featuring the original Tokyo cast. It is notable for being the first (and so far the only) Cast Album of the show that includes Glinda's Finale dialogue. A Polish recording was released on February 15, 2026, becoming the first non-replica production to receive a cast album.

== Productions ==
=== Original Broadway production (2003–present) ===
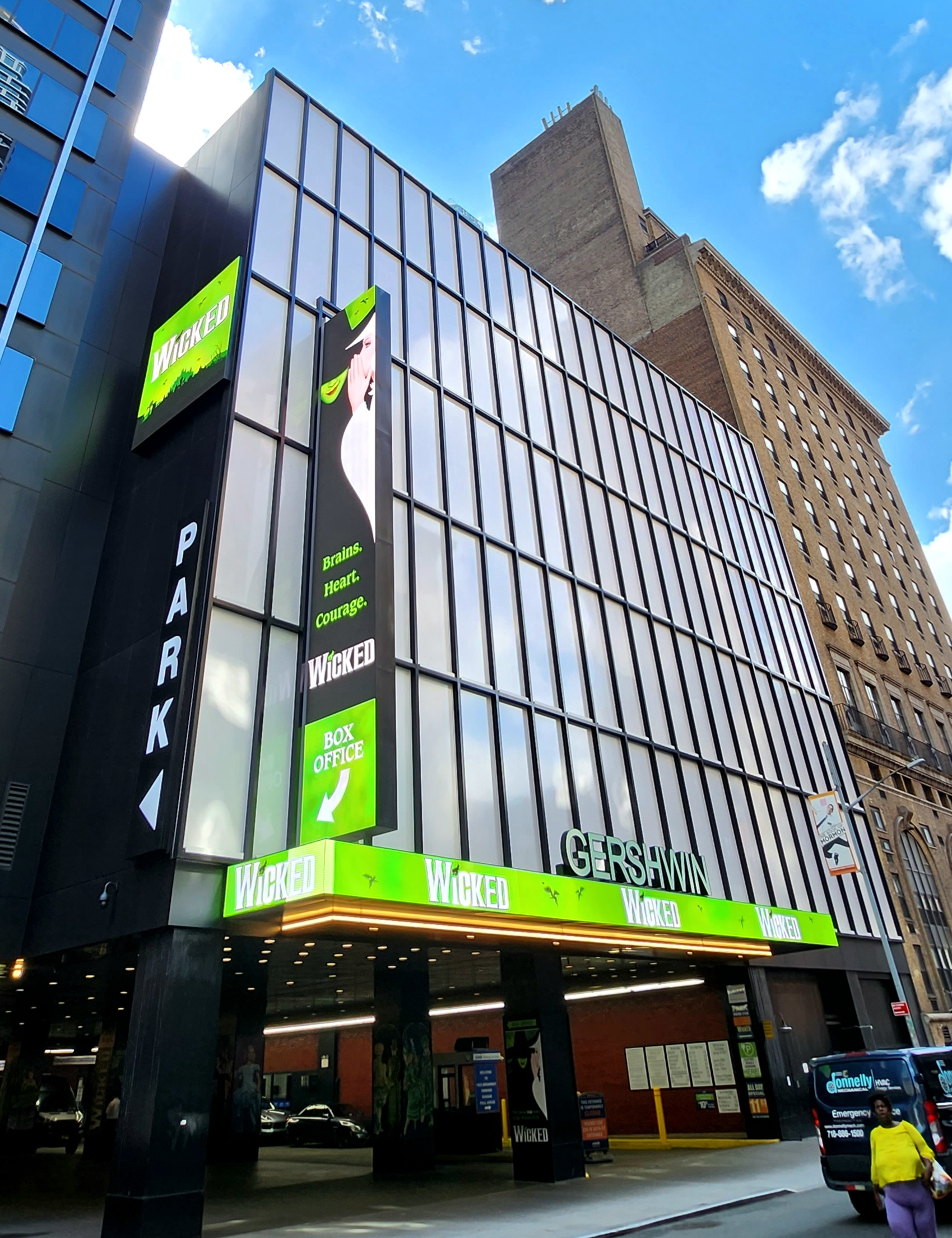
The Gershwin Theatre has hosted the Broadway production since its opening in 2003.

Wicked officially opened on June 10, 2003, at the Curran Theatre in San Francisco, after previews began on May 28. The cast included Kristin Chenoweth as Glinda, Idina Menzel as Elphaba, Robert Morse as the Wizard, Norbert Leo Butz as Fiyero, Michelle Federer as Nessarose, Carole Shelley as Madame Morrible, John Horton as Doctor Dillamond, and Kirk McDonald as Boq. Stephanie J. Block, who originally read the role of Elphaba during the show's workshop stage, was Menzel's understudy during tryouts, but left before the show moved to Broadway. She would then lead the 1st National Tour opposite Kendra Kassebaum as Glinda. The tryout closed on June 29, 2003.

After extensive retooling, the musical began previews on Broadway at the Gershwin Theatre on October 8, 2003, and opened on October 30. Most of the original production team and cast members remained with the show. Principal casting changes included Joel Grey as the Wizard, William Youmans as Doctor Dillamond and Christopher Fitzgerald as Boq. On March 12, 2020, the show suspended production due to the COVID-19 pandemic. Performances resumed on September 14, 2021, with Lindsay Pearce as Elphaba and Ginna Claire Mason as Glinda. Chenoweth made a pre-curtain speech before the reopening.

=== North American productions (2005–present) ===
On March 31, 2005, the first national tour of Wicked (called the "Emerald City Tour" by the producers) started in Toronto, Ontario, and went on to visit numerous cities throughout the United States and Canada. The original touring cast included Kendra Kassebaum as Glinda, Stephanie J. Block as Elphaba, Derrick Williams as Fiyero, Jenna Leigh Green as Nessarose, Carol Kane as Madame Morrible, Timothy Britten Parker as Doctor Dillamond, Logan Lipton as Boq, and David Garrison as the Wizard. The tour concluded at the Pantages Theatre in Los Angeles on March 15, 2015, after 4,160 performances, with Jennifer DiNoia as Elphaba and Chandra Lee Schwartz as Glinda.

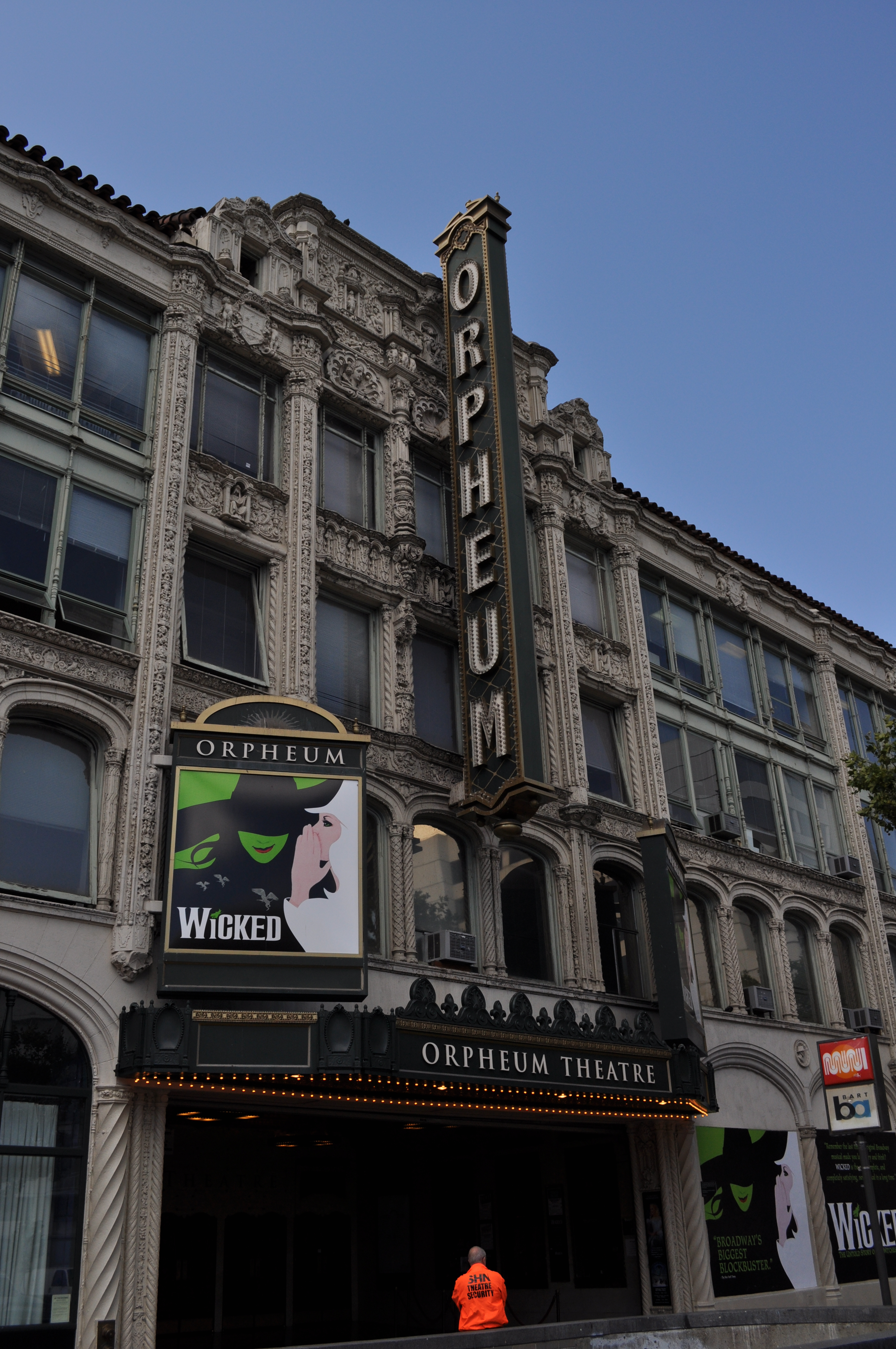
Wicked playing at the Orpheum Theatre in San Francisco

Following a limited engagement of the first national tour from April 29 to June 2005, a sit-down production of Wicked opened at the Oriental Theatre in Chicago immediately following the tour, using the original set of the tour. The cast included Ana Gasteyer as Elphaba, Kate Reinders as Glinda, Rondi Reed as Madame Morrible, Kristoffer Cusick as Fiyero, Telly Leung as Boq, Heidi Kettenring as Nessarose and Gene Weygandt as the Wizard. The production closed on January 25, 2009, after 1,500 performances with Dee Roscioli as Elphaba and Annaleigh Ashford as Glinda.

An open-ended production also appeared in Los Angeles, California, at the Pantages Theatre. Performances began on February 10, 2007, with an official opening on February 21. The cast included Megan Hilty as Glinda, Eden Espinosa as Elphaba, Carol Kane as Madame Morrible, Timothy Britten Parker as Doctor Dillamond, Jenna Leigh Green as Nessarose, Adam Wylie as Boq, Kristoffer Cusick as Fiyero, and John Rubinstein as the Wizard. The show closed on January 11, 2009, with the same leads, after 791 performances and 12 previews.

A San Francisco production of Wicked officially opened February 6, 2009, at SHN's Orpheum Theatre. The cast included Teal Wicks as Elphaba, Kendra Kassebaum as Glinda, Nicolas Dromard as Fiyero, Carol Kane as Madame Morrible, David Garrison as the Wizard, Deedee Magno Hall as Nessarose, Tom Flynn as Doctor Dillamond, and Eddy Rioseco as Boq. The production closed on September 5, 2010, with Marcie Dodd as Elphaba and Alli Mauzey as Glinda, after 660 performances and 12 previews.

The second national tour of Wicked (called the "Munchkinland Tour") began on 12 March 2009 at the Barbara B. Mann Performing Arts Hall in Fort Myers, Florida. The original cast starred Marcie Dodd as Elphaba, Heléne Yorke as Glinda, Colin Donnell as Fiyero, and Tom McGowan as the Wizard. The production was suspended in March 2020 due to the COVID-19 pandemic and resumed performances on August 3, 2021, with Talia Suskauer as Elphaba, Allison Bailey as Glinda and Curt Hansen as Fiyero. The production celebrated its 5,000th performance on July 30, 2022.

=== London (2006–present) ===
The original West End (London) production began previews at the Apollo Victoria Theatre on September 7, 2006, with an opening night on September 27. The show celebrated its 10th anniversary in 2016 with a special curtain call featuring former West End cast members. The British production was tailored slightly for a British audience, including minor creative changes to dialogue, choreography and special effects. A majority of them were later incorporated into all productions of Wicked, including the Broadway production and the two US national tours.

The London production reunited the show's original creative team. Original London cast members included the return of Idina Menzel as Elphaba, Helen Dallimore as Glinda, Miriam Margolyes as Madame Morrible, Adam Garcia as Fiyero, Martin Ball as Doctor Dillamond, James Gillan as Boq, Katie Rowley Jones as Nessarose and Nigel Planer as the Wizard. After her limited engagement, which ended on December 30, 2006, Menzel was succeeded on January 1, 2007, by Kerry Ellis, who became the first British actress to play Elphaba.

The production suspended performances on March 16, 2020, due to the COVID-19 pandemic. It resumed performances on September 15, 2021, in time for the production's 15th anniversary. Sophie Evans reopened the show in the role of Glinda and left when the cast changed on January 30, 2022. Helen Woolf returned from maternity leave then and Lucie Jones took over as Elphaba. As the production passed its 20th anniversary in 2026, the Royal Mint issued a UK 50p coin commemorating the musical, its reverse showing Elphaba's hat and broomstick as the hands of a clock.

=== UK and Ireland tours (2013–2025) ===
The first UK and Ireland tour began on September 12, 2013, at the Palace Theatre in Manchester and ended on July 25, 2015 in Salford.

Another tour began in December 2017, opening at the Theater 11 in Zurich, before making its first British stop in January 2018 at the Bristol Hippodrome. The tour ended in January 2019 at the Palace Theatre in Manchester. The cast included Amy Ross as Elphaba, Helen Woolf as Glinda, Aaron Sidwell as Fiyero, and Steven Pinder as the Wizard/Doctor Dillamond. A further UK and Ireland tour opened on 7 December 2023 at the Edinburgh Playhouse and ended in January 2025 at the Palace Theatre in Manchester. Laura Pick returned to lead the tour as Elphaba with Sarah O'Connor as Glinda and Carl Man as Fiyero. Simeon Truby played the Wizard/Dillamond with Donna Berlin as Madame Morrible, Jed Berry as Boq and Megan Gardiner as Nessarose.

=== Mexican production (2013–2015) ===
In 2013, for Wicked 10th anniversary, the first Spanish adaptation of the show opened in Mexico City, with book and lyrics fully translated by Marco Villafán, titled Wicked, la historia jamás contada de las brujas de Oz. Ana Cecilia Anzaldúa and Danna Paola were alternating in the role of Elphaba with Cecilia de la Cueva as Glinda. Danna Paola made her stage debut becoming the youngest actress ever to portray Elphaba, at just 18 years old. The show was produced by OCESA Teatro and opened on 17 October 2013 at the Teatro Telcel, closing in January 2015.

In the 2024 film version, Danna and de la Cueva dubbed the voices of Elphaba and Glinda, respectively, in Spanish, reprising their stage roles.

=== German productions (2007–2011; 2021–2022) ===
Renamed Wicked: Die Hexen von Oz (Wicked: The Witches of Oz), the German production of Wicked began previews on November 1, 2007, and opened on November 15, at the Palladium Theater in Stuttgart. Willemijn Verkaik played Elphaba and Lucy Scherer Glinda. The show was produced by Stage Entertainment and closed on January 29, 2010, transferring to Oberhausen where previews began at the Metronom Theater on March 5, 2010, with an opening night of March 8. Joana Fee Würz took over the role of Glinda. The show closed on September 2, 2011.

On September 5, 2021, a brand new production of Wicked opened at the Neue Flora Theatre in Hamburg, produced by Stage Entertainment again, which previously had presented the show in Stuttgart, Oberhausen, and The Hague. Vajèn van den Bosch and Jeannine Wacker were cast as Elphaba and Glinda respectively.

=== Australian and New Zealand productions ===
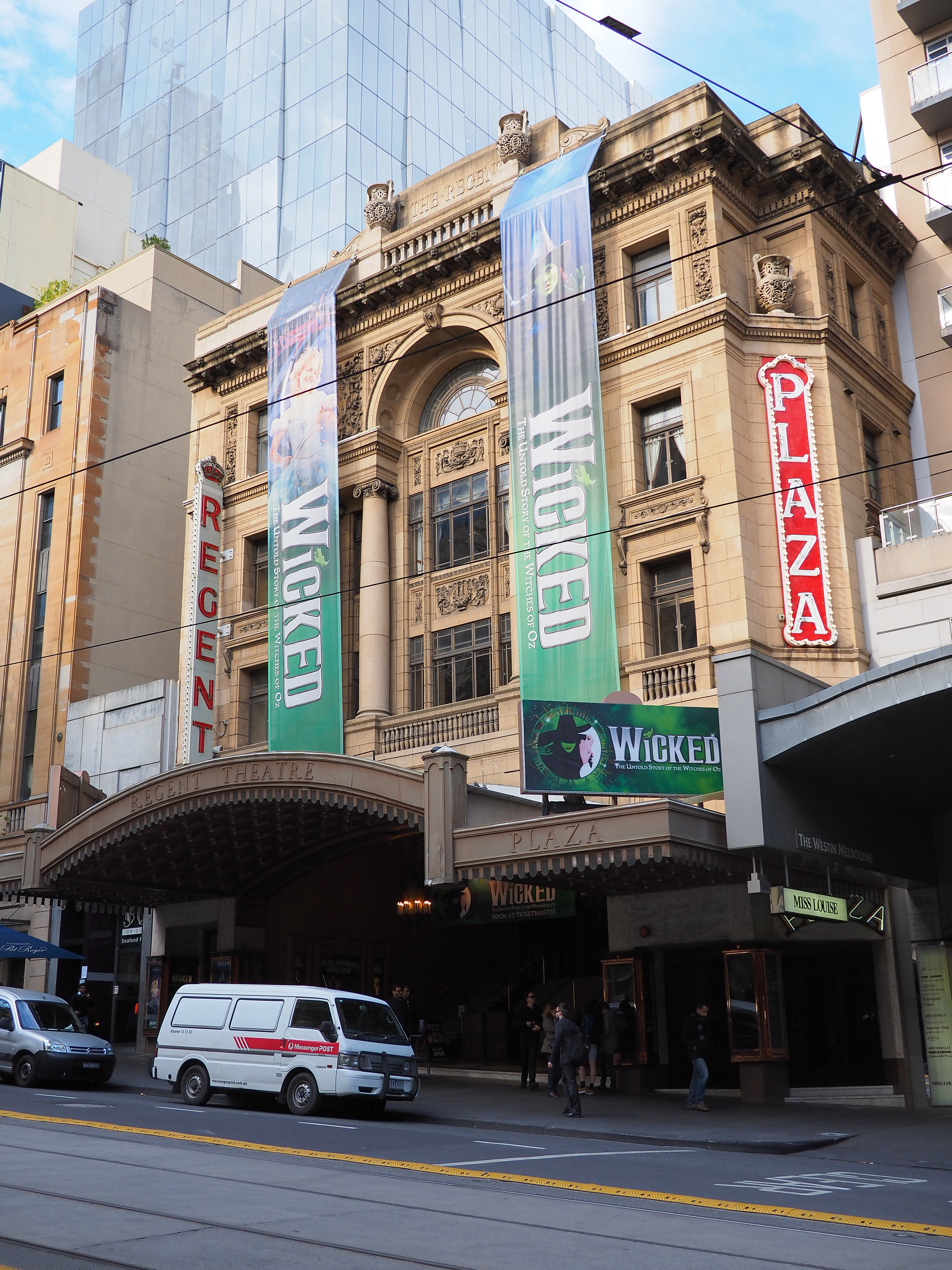
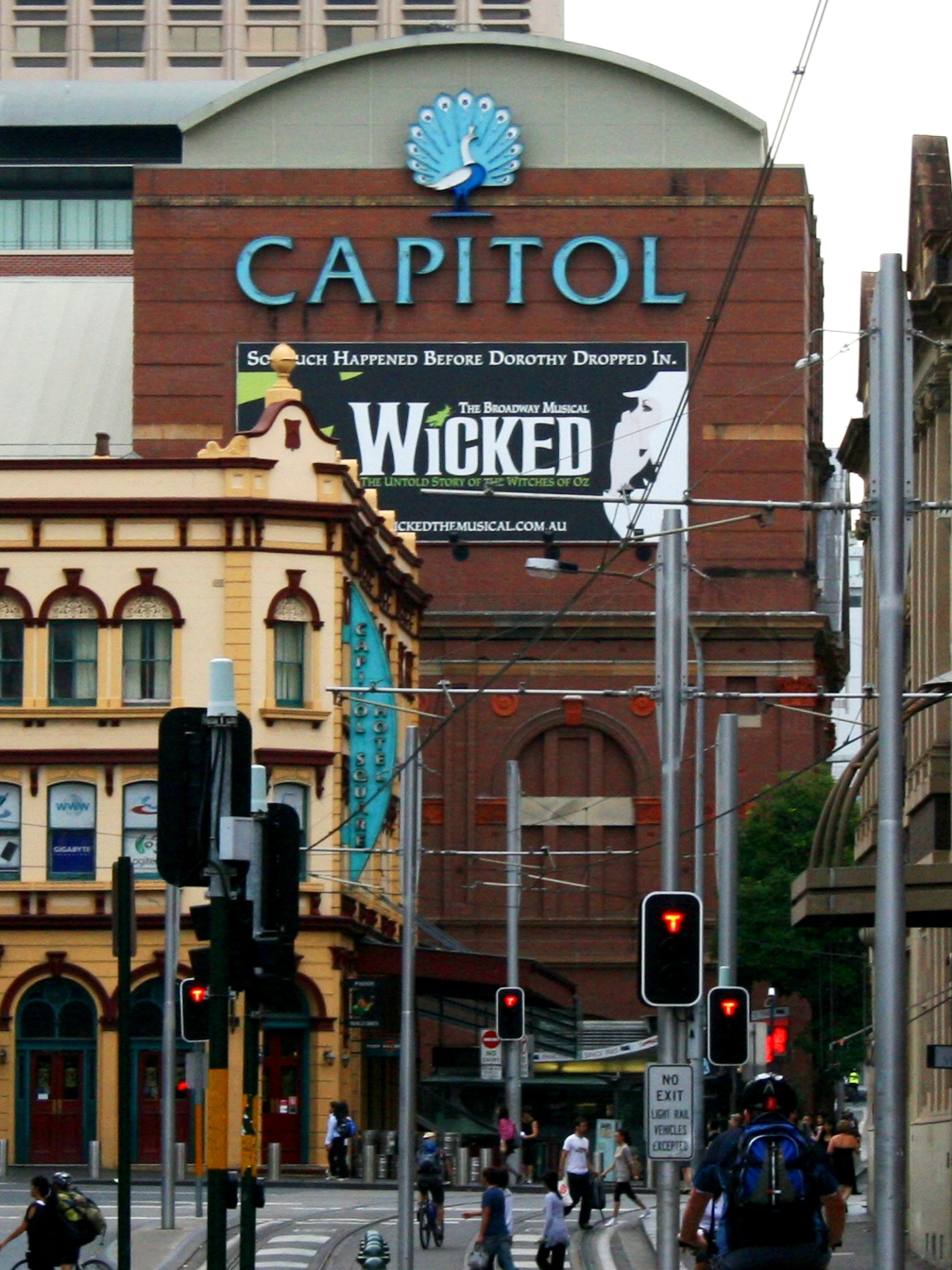
Wicked at the Regent Theatre, Melbourne (left) and the Capitol Theatre, Sydney (right)

An Australian production of the show officially opened on July 12, 2008, with previews commencing June 27 at the Regent Theatre in Melbourne.

Amanda Harrison was originally cast as Elphaba, with Lucy Durack as Glinda. The original cast consisted of Rob Mills as Fiyero, Anthony Callea as Boq, Rob Guest as the Wizard, Maggie Kirkpatrick as Madame Morrible, Penny McNamee as Nessarose and Rodney Dobson as Doctor Dillamond. Guest unexpectedly died of a stroke months into the Melbourne season, with the role being taken up by Bert Newton.

Closing in Melbourne August 9, 2009, the show transferred to Sydney's Capitol Theatre. Previews began on September 5, 2009, with the official opening on September 12. Shortly into the run, Harrison was forced to leave the role of Elphaba due to an illness, so current standby Jemma Rix and Australian theatre veteran Pippa Grandison began to share the role, each appearing in four shows per week. Eventually, it was confirmed that Harrison would not be returning to the cast.

Closing in Sydney September 26, 2010, the production then embarked on a national Australian tour starting at the QPAC Lyric Theatre in Brisbane. After a two-week delay due to the Queensland floods, performances began January 25, 2011, and ran until April 2. Rix became the sole lead Elphaba with David Harris joining as the new Fiyero. The touring production then moved to the Festival Centre in Adelaide, running from April 14 until June 4, 2011, with the final leg of the tour playing the Burswood Theatre in Perth, from June 19 to September 11, 2011, after three years of performances in Australia.

The show made its premiere in New Zealand in 2013, with previews taking place on September 17, and official opening night on September 21. The Auckland run concluded on November 24, 2013, where it played the Civic Theatre. The cast then moved on to the Main Theater of the Cultural Center of the Philippines in Manila on a limited run from January 22 through March 9, 2014.

The show returned to Australia for a 10th anniversary commemorative national tour, beginning in Melbourne on May 10, 2014. Durack returned as Glinda, Rix as Elphaba, Steve Danielsen as Fiyero, Simon Gallaher as the Wizard, Edward Grey as Boq, Emily Cascarino as Nessarose, Glen Hogstrom as Doctor Dillamond and original cast member Maggie Kirkpatrick as Madame Morrible. Mathers replaced the pregnant Durack as Glinda. After seven years and close to 2,000 performances across 8 different cities internationally, Wicked closed indefinitely at the Burswood Theatre in Perth on June 28, 2015.

In 2023, in celebration of the 20th anniversary of the original Broadway production the show returned to Australia once again, to the Sydney Lyric Theatre where it opened on September 7. The cast included Sheridan Adams as Elphaba, Courtney Monsma as Glinda, Robyn Nevin as Madame Morrible, Todd McKenney as the Wizard, Liam Head as Fiyero, Adam Murphy as Dr. Dillamond, Shewit Belay as Nessarose, and Kurtis Papadinis as Boq. The production returned to the Regent Theatre in Melbourne on March 7, 2024. It transferred to the QPAC Lyric Theatre in Brisbane September and ran at the Crown Theatre in Perth from December 2024. The production transferred to Singapore at the Sands Theatre in Marina Bay, opening on March 19, 2025.

=== International tour (2016–2018) ===
Wicked's international tour opened on July 13, 2016, at the Alhambra Theatre in Bradford, England. Jacqueline Hughes starred as Elphaba, with Carly Anderson as Glinda and Bradley Jaden as Fiyero. Alongside them Steven Pinder as the Wizard and Doctor Dillamond and Kim Ismay as Madame Morrible. Bradford was the only UK stop of the tour, which then performed in Singapore and in other cities worldwide. Jodie Steele was standby for Elphaba in this production.

=== Other international productions ===
A full Japanese production of Wicked by the Shiki Theatre Company opened in Tokyo, Japan, on June 17, 2007, and subsequently moved to Osaka, Fukuoka and Nagoya, before closing in Sapporo on November 6, 2016. To celebrate their 70th anniversary, the company produced a Japanese revival of the show from October 2023 to January 2024. An Asian tour began at Singapore's Grand Theater on December 6, 2011, with Australian actresses Suzie Mathers as Glinda and Jemma Rix as Elphaba. It closed on October 6, 2012.

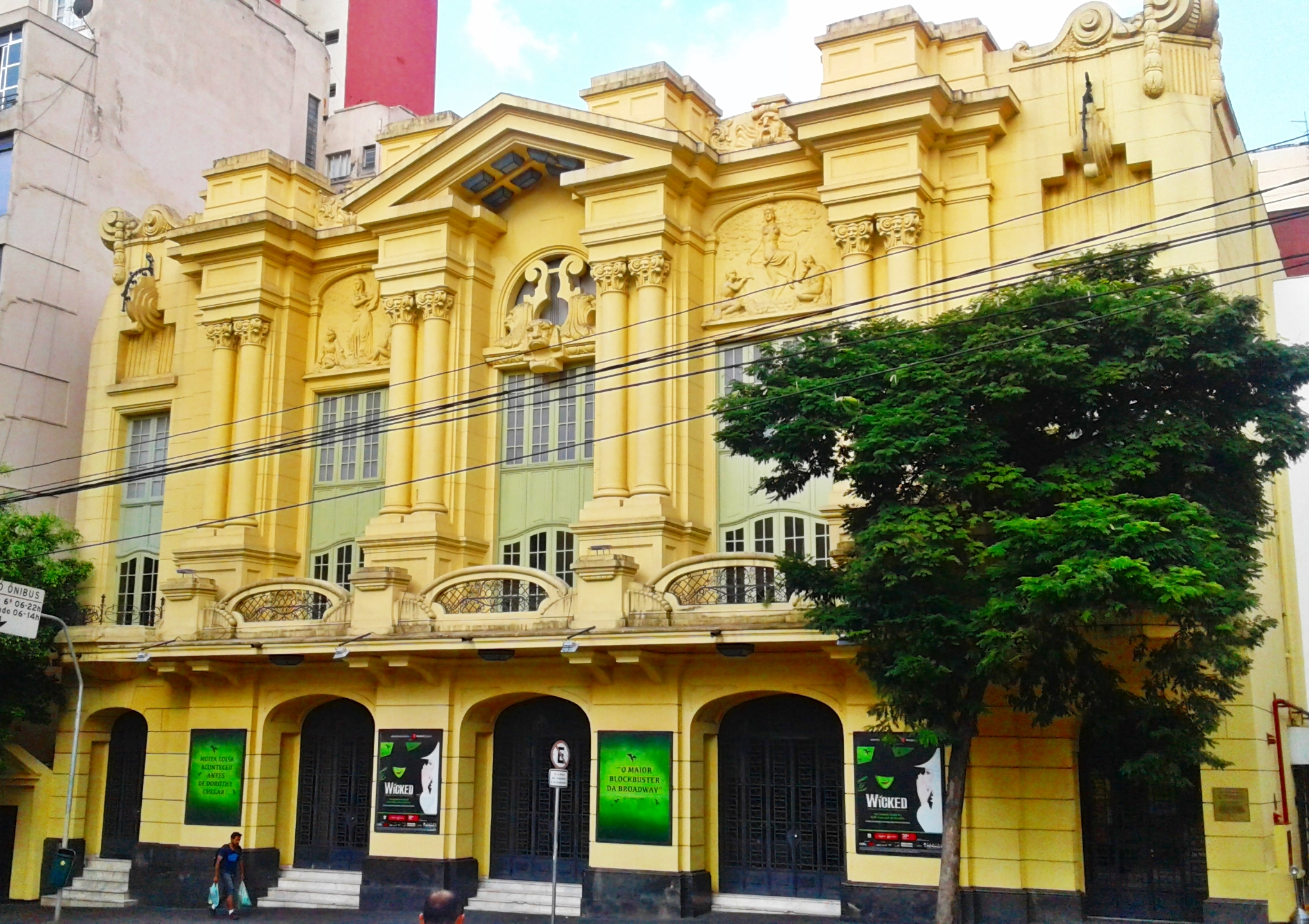
Renault Theater, stage of the Portuguese version of Wicked in São Paulo, Brazil

A Dutch-language production began previews at the Circustheater in The Hague on October 26, 2011, and was produced by Joop van den Ende Theaterproducties/Stage Entertainment. Official opening took place on November 6. Willemijn Verkaik reprised her role of Elphaba from the German productions, becoming the first actress to play the role in two different languages. The first Korean-language production began performances in Seoul on November 22, 2013. It ran at the Charlotte Theater until October 5, 2014. The first Portuguese adaptation of the musical debuted in March 2016 at the Renault Theatre in São Paulo, Brazil, and was performed on the largest stage to that date. The production closed on December 18, 2016..

A production that started previews in Seoul, South Korea's Blue Square Theater on February 12, 2021, was the first Wicked performance worldwide after the COVID-19 shutdown. The production opened on February 16 and played until May 2, 2021. It then transferred to Busan's Dream Theater, where it ran from May 20 until June 27, 2021.

=== Non-replica productions ===
A condensed thirty-minute adaptation of Wicked played at Universal Studios Japan in Osaka, Japan from 2006 to 2011. Australian actress Jemma Rix was once again part of the original cast of the show, alternating the role of Elphaba with Jillian Giaachi and Taylor Jordan. The show opened on July 12, 2006, and featured the preliminary storyline of Act 1 but the characters of Fiyero, Madame Morrible, Boq, Nessarose and Doctor Dillamond were absent, with considerable changes in the show's sets and costumes. The production closed on January 11, 2011.

Another new staging opened at the City Theatre in Helsinki, Finland, on August 26, 2010. Directed by Hans Berndtsson and choreographed by Rebecca Evanne, the cast included Maria Ylipää as Elphaba and Anna-Maija Tuokko as Glinda.

The second European production ran in Copenhagen, Denmark from January 12 until May 29, 2011, and was presented by Det Ny Teater. It starred Maria Lucia Heiberg Rosenberg as Elphaba and Annette Heick as Glinda.

A revival in Brazil had a limited run, starting March 9, 2023, at the Santander Theater, in São Paulo, produced by Atelier de Cultura. Lead actresses from the 2016 run Myra Ruiz and Fabi Bang reprised their roles as Elphaba and Glinda, respectively. Their co-stars included Tiago Barbosa as Fiyero, Marcelo Médici as The Wizard, Diva Menner as Madame Morrible, Cleto Baccic as Doctor Dillamond, Nayara Venancio as Nessarose and Dante Paccola as Boq. Ruiz and Bang voiced Elphaba and Glinda in the dubbing for the 2024 film adaptation of the show. A remount of the 2023 Brazilian production, produced by Broadway Entertainment Group, opened in Riyadh, Saudi Arabia, in December 2025. The production subsequently toured to Bahrain, Dubai, and Mumbai, closing in March 2026. This marked the first time Wicked had been performed in both the Middle East and India. The cast featured Rebekah Lowings as Elphaba, Eve Shauna-Wilson as Glinda, and Michael Mather as Fiyero.

A Swedish production premiered on September 16, 2023, at the Gothenburg opera house, starring Anna Salonen as Glinda and Feline Andersson as Elphaba; the production is directed by Samuel Harjanne with translations done by Calle Norlén. A new Danish production starred Johanne Milland as Glinda and Nanna Rossen as Elphaba. It opened September 16, 2024 at Fredericia Musicalteater. The production transferred to the Tivoli Concert Hall from October 11 until 19 before returning to Fredericia Musicalteater for the remainder of its run. The production also starred Diluckshan Jeyaratnam as Fiyero, Anders Gjellerup Koch as The Wizard, Cecilie Thiim as Madame Morrible, Christian Lund as Dr. Dillamond, Marie Louise Hansen as Nessarose, and Jens Kau Wahlers Nielsen as Boq. The first Norwegian production opened at Folketeateret, Oslo in March 2025. It was a replica production of 2024 Danish production. Alexandra Rotan played Glinda.

On March 18, 2025, a Brazilian production opened at Teatro Renault. Ruiz and Bang once again reprised their roles as Elphaba and Glinda, respectively. They were joined by Hipólyto as Fiyero, Baccic as the Wizard, Karin Hils as Madame Morrible, Arízio Magalhães as Doctor Dillamond, Luisa Bresser as Nessarose and Thadeu Torres as Boq.

On April 5, 2025, the first Polish production opened at ROMA Musical Theatre with Stephen Schwartz and Winnie Holzman in the audience, starring Natalia Krakowiak as Elphaba, Anna Federowicz as Glinda, Marcin Franc as Fiyero, Damian Aleksander as The Wizard, Katarzyna Walczak as Madame Morrible, Joanna Gorzała as Nessarose, Karol Jankiewicz as Boq and Wojciech Dmochowski as Doctor Dillamond. The production was director by Wojciech Kępczyński and the translation done by Michał Wojnarowski.

A Spanish-language production officially opened on October 8, 2025, at the Nuevo Teatro Alcalá in Madrid, Spain, starring Cristina Picos as Elphaba and Cristina Llorente as Glinda.

On October 3, 2025, the first Austrian production opened at The Stadttheater Baden, starring Laura Panzeri as Elphaba, Vanessa Heinz as Glinda, Timotheus Hollweg as Fiyero, Beppo Binder as Dr. Dillamond, Anna Rosa Döller as Nessarose, Jens Emmert as Boq (renamed "Moq"), Maya Hakvoort as Madame Morrible (renamed "Madame Akaber"), with Mark Seibert and Andreas Lichtenberger sharing the role of The Wizard.

The first Hungarian production of the show is set to be premiered in the Szeged Open Air Theatre in the 14th of August, 2026. The production will be directed by Vajk Szente.

== Reception ==
=== Awards and nominations ===
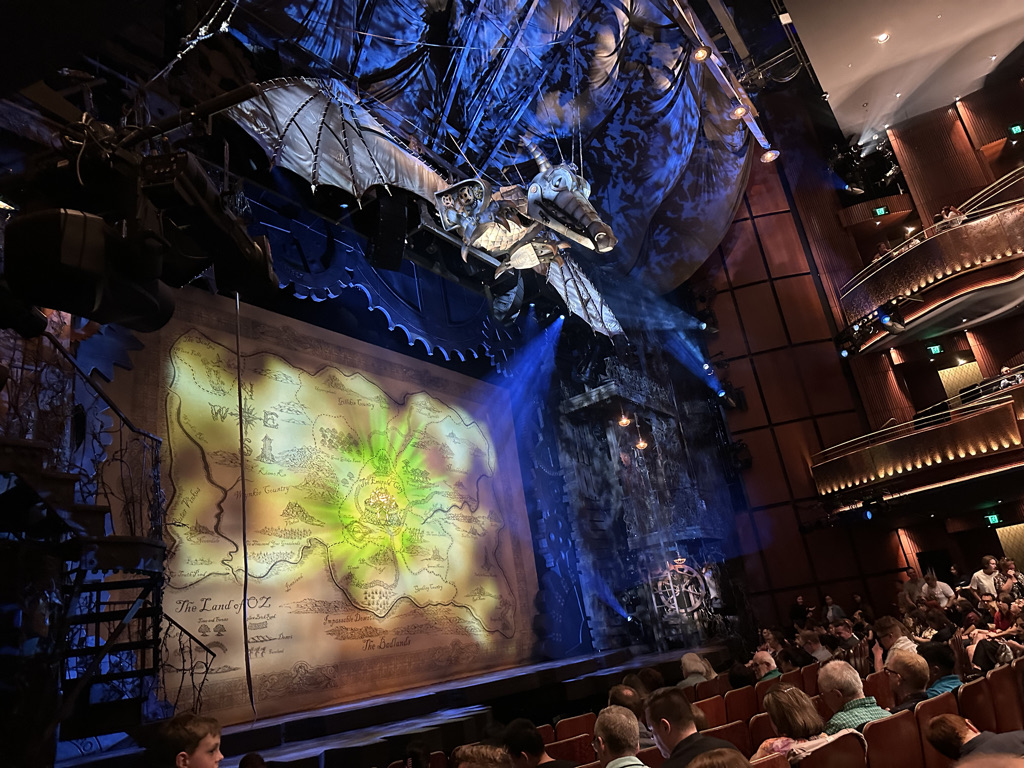
Eugene Lee's Tony Award winning set design for Wicked at the Sydney Lyric

The original Broadway production of Wicked was nominated for ten Tony Awards in 2004, including Best Musical, Book, Orchestrations, Original Score, Choreography, Costume Design, Lighting Design, Scenic Design while receiving two nominations for Best Actress – for Menzel and Chenoweth. Menzel won the Best Actress award, and the show also won the Award for Best Scenic Design and Best Costume Design, notably losing Best Book, Original Score and ultimately Best Musical to Avenue Q. The same year, the show also won 6 Drama Desk Awards out of 11 nominations, including Outstanding Musical, Book, Director, and Costume Design.

Subsequent productions have received awards and nominations as well. The West End production received five Laurence Olivier Award nominations, including Best Director, Best Set Design and Best Costume Design and later won the Audience Award for Most Popular Show at the 2010 and 2015 Olivier Awards. The original Australian production received six Helpmann Awards out of 12 nominations, including Best Musical. Wicked was named the Best Musical of the Decade by Entertainment Weekly magazine and hailed "a cultural phenomenon" by Variety magazine. While not technically an "award", the character of Elphaba was named 79th on Entertainment Weekly's list of The 100 Greatest Characters of the Past 20 Years.

=== Critical reception ===
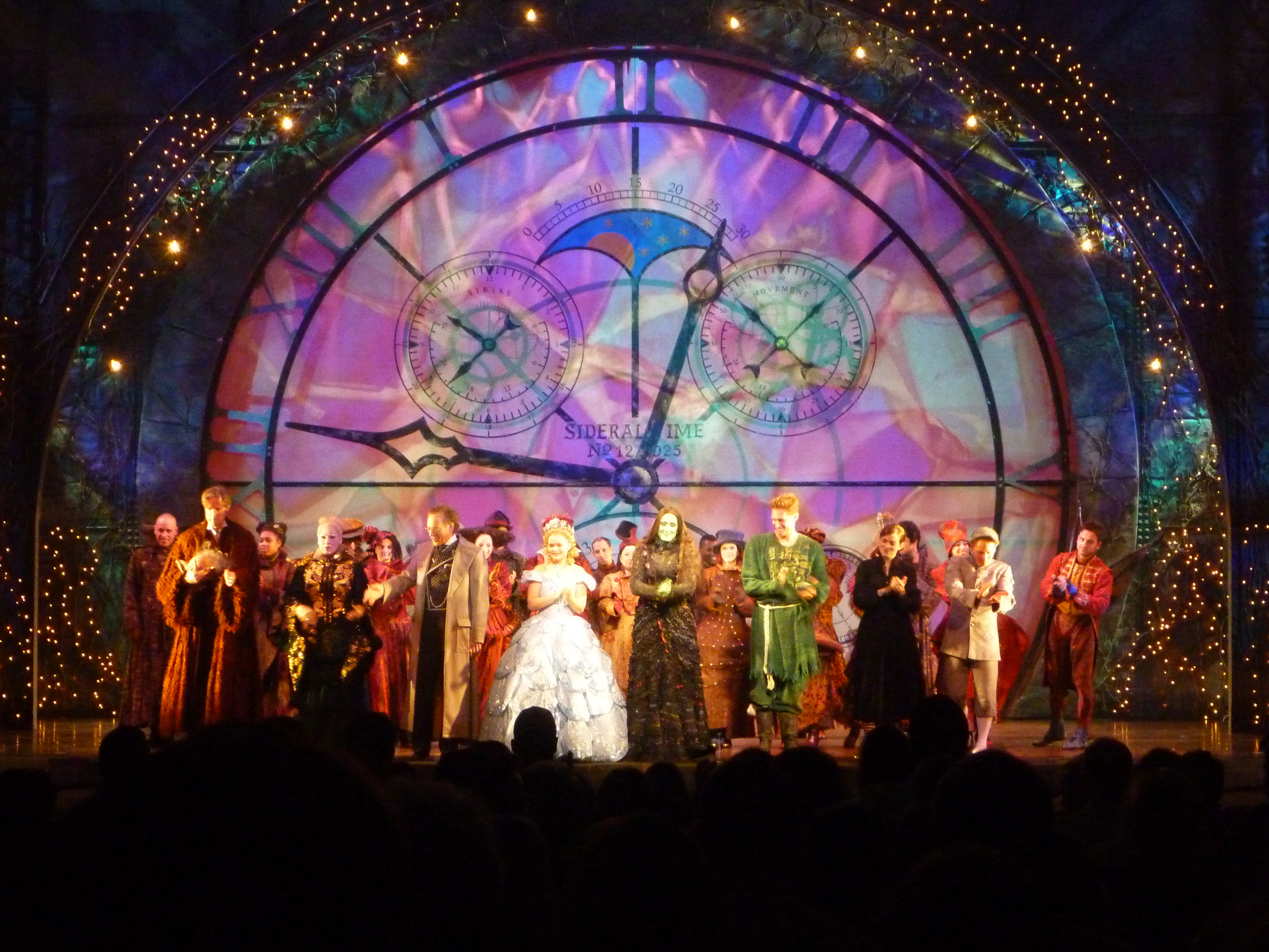
Touring cast members in the curtain call at a show in Omaha, Nebraska

In its out-of-town tryout in San Francisco, audience reaction was generally positive, and although critics tended to compliment the aesthetic and spectacle of the show, they disparaged the book, score, and choreography. Dennis Harvey of Variety praised the production as "sleekly directed", "snazzily designed", and "smartly cast", but disliked its "mediocre" book, "trite" lyrics, and "largely generic" music. Karen D'Souza of the San Jose Mercury News wrote that "style over substance is the real theme in this Emerald City".

The Broadway production opened on October 30, 2003, to mixed reviews. However, Chenoweth and Menzel received acclaim for their performances. Richard Zoglin of Time wrote: "If every musical had a brain, a heart and the courage of Wicked, Broadway really would be a magical place." Elysa Gardner of USA Today described it as "the most complete, and completely satisfying, new musical I've come across in a long time". Conversely, Ben Brantley in the New York Times loved the production but panned the show itself, calling it a "sermon" that "so overplays its hand that it seriously dilutes its power", with a "generic" score. He noted that Glinda is such a showy role that the audience ends up rooting for her rather than the "surprisingly colorless" Elphaba, who is "nominally" the hero. Despite these mixed reviews, interest in Wicked spread quickly by word-of-mouth, leading to record-breaking success at the box office. Speaking to The Arizona Republic in 2006, Schwartz said, "What can I say? Reviews are reviews.... I know we divided the critics. We didn't divide the audience, and that's what counts."

The West End production opened to a slightly more upbeat response. The majority of critics have appreciated the spectacle of the lavish production, and the "powerhouse" performances of actors in the roles of the two witches. However, contemporaries have characterized the production as overblown, occasionally preachy, and suffering from more hype than heart. Although Charles Spencer of The Daily Telegraph described it as "at times... a bit of a mess," he praised Holzman's script, described Kenneth Posner's lighting design as "magical" and lauded Menzel's Elphaba and Helen Dallimore's Glinda. Michael Billington of The Guardian gave it three out of five stars and remarked on the competence of all the lead actors; however, he complained that Wicked was "all too typical of the modern Broadway musical: efficient, knowing and highly professional but more like a piece of industrial product than something that genuinely touches the heart or mind." Paul Taylor of The Independent called the topical political allegory "well-meaning but also melodramatic, incoherent and dreadfully superficial" and criticized the acting, songs and book, concluding that "the production manages to feel at once overblown and empty".

A review of a Chinese production in the Shanghai Review of Books was very favorable.

=== Commercial reception ===
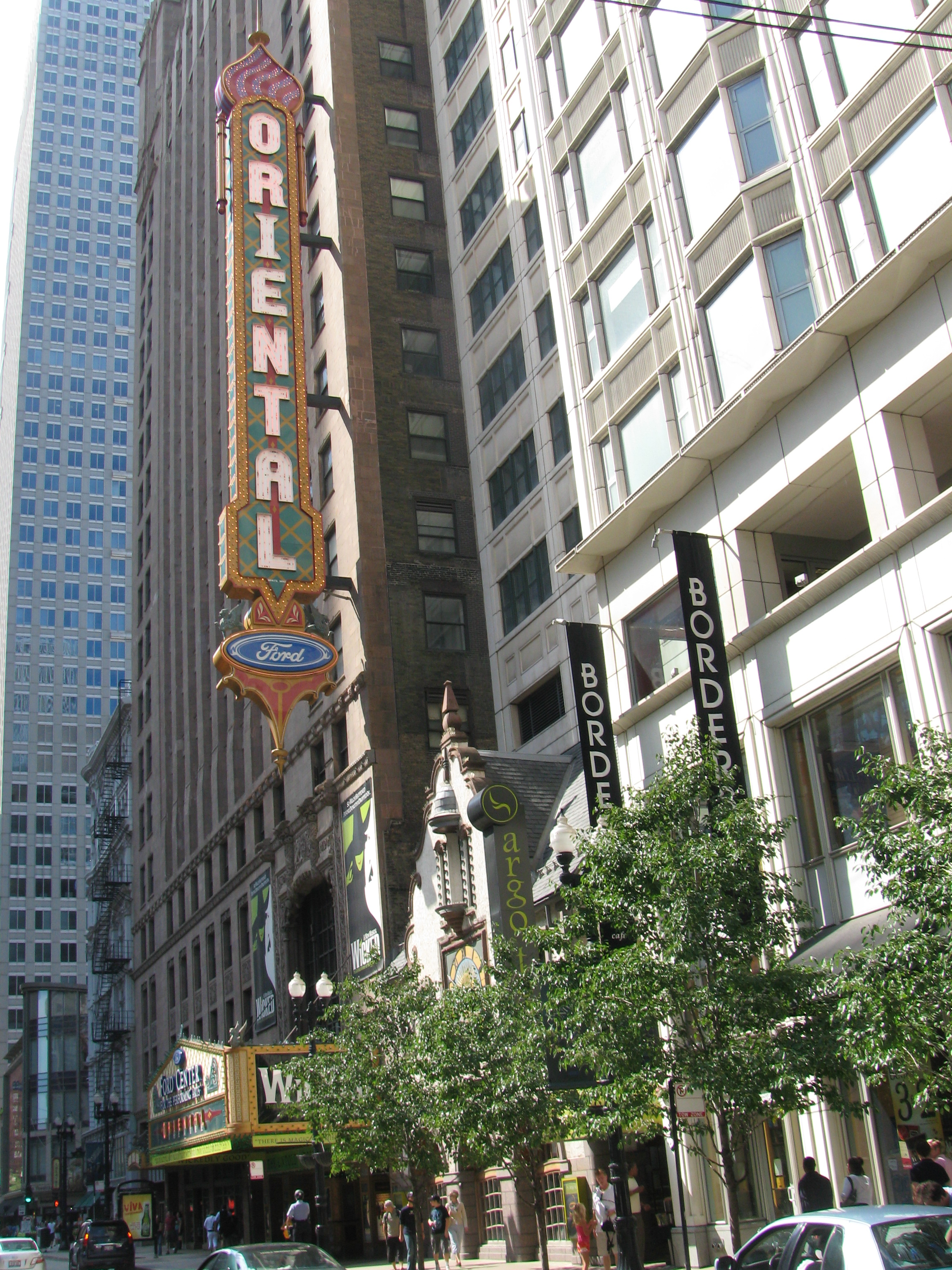
Playing at the Oriental Theatre for more than three years, the Chicago production continually broke box-office records.

Since its opening in 2003, the original Broadway production of Wicked has broken the house record at the Gershwin Theatre twenty times. It regularly grosses in excess of $1.6 million each week, making it one of the most lucrative productions on Broadway. With a $14 million capitalization, the Broadway production took 15 months to break even, earning back its initial investment by December 21, 2004. In its first year, it grossed more than $56 million. In the week ending January 1, 2006, Wicked broke the record, previously held by the musical The Producers, for the highest weekly box office gross in Broadway history, earning $1,610,934. It has gone on to break its own record numerous times, reaching $1,715,155 in November 2006, $2,086,135 for the week ending November 29, 2009 and over $2.2 million in the week ending January 2, 2011. In the first week of 2012, the Broadway production broke a record again, earning $2.7 million. In the final weekend of 2013, Wicked became the first musical to gross $3 million in one week.

Wicked's productions across North America and abroad have been equally financially successful. The Los Angeles production took the local weekly gross record, again from a performance of The Producers, bringing in $1,786,110 in the week ending March 4, 2007, with records also set in Chicago ($1,418,363), and St Louis ($2,291,608), to bring the collective gross of the seven worldwide productions to a world record-breaking $11.2 million. A new suite of records were set over Christmas 2010, with house records broken in San Francisco ($1,485,692), Providence ($1,793,764) and Schenectady ($1,657,139) as well as Broadway, bringing the musical's one-week gross in North America alone to $7,062,335.

Wicked played to more than 2 million visitors in Chicago with a gross of over $200 million, making it the highest-grossing show in Chicago history up to June 2007. With an opening-week gross of $1,400,000, it became the longest-running Broadway musical in Chicago history. Producer David Stone told Variety, "we thought it [the Chicago production] would run 18 months, then we'd spend a year in Los Angeles and six months in San Francisco... but sales stayed so strong that the producers created another road show and kept the show running in Chicago." The Los Angeles production grossed over $145 million and was seen by more than 1.8 million patrons. Over the 672 performances of the San Francisco production, Wicked sold over 1 million tickets with a cumulative gross of over $75 million. While its Broadway production welcomed its 5 millionth audience member on September 29, 2010.

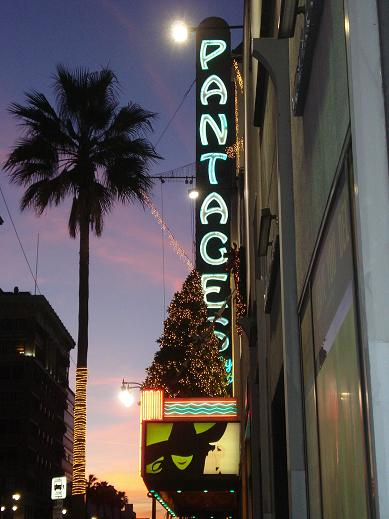
The Los Angeles production played at the Pantages Theatre for almost two years, grossing more than $145 million.

Although West End theatres do not publish audited weekly grosses, the West End production of Wicked said it had set the record for highest one-week gross in December 2006, taking £761,000 in the week ending December 30. On June 23, 2008, the producers reported that over 1.4 million people had seen the London production, and grosses had topped £50 million. The same reports stated that the show had consistently been one of the two highest-grossing shows in the West End. For the week commencing December 27, 2010, the London production grossed £1,002,885, the highest single-week gross in West End theatre history, with over 20,000 people attending the nine performances of Wicked that week. The Melbourne production broke Australian box-office records, selling 24,750 tickets in three hours during pre-sales and grossing over $1.3 million on the first business day after its official opening. On April 27, 2009, the production passed the milestone of 500,000 patrons. When it transferred to Sydney, the production broke "all previous weekly box office records for a musical at the Capitol Theatre, grossing $1,473,775.70 in one week during October 2009.

By seats sold on Broadway, Wicked ranks third of all time. The show celebrated its 7,486th performance on Broadway on April 11, 2023 (the show's 20th anniversary year), surpassing Andrew Lloyd Webber's Cats as the fourth-longest-running Broadway show in history. Several other productions have also reached milestones such as the West End show in London, reaching 6512 performances on 22 September 2023, the North American tour surpassing 4,160 performances and the Australian run of the show, that reached 1,000 performances.

=== Marketing and promotion ===
The success of the Broadway production has led to the development of an auxiliary show for purposes of marketing and promotion titled Behind the Emerald Curtain. It was created by Sean McCourt—an original Broadway production cast member who played the Elphaba's father and understudied both the Wizard and Doctor Dillamond—and Anthony Galde, who was a long-running swing in the Broadway company from 2004 to 2012. The tour features a ninety-minute behind-the-scenes look at the props, masks, costumes and sets used in the show, and includes a question-and-answer session with the cast members. The tour also featured in the Los Angeles, San Francisco and Chicago sit-down productions, and were each run by different long-serving cast members of the show. The tour provides a behind-the-scenes look at what goes into putting on the show every day. Participants get a first-hand account of what it is like to be a part of the massive production that Wicked is. To create Elphaba's green skin, 40 pots of the commercially available MAC Chromacake landscape green make-up are used per year. It is water-based for easy removal.

== Legacy and anniversary tributes ==
=== A Very Wicked Halloween (2018) ===
To celebrate the 15th anniversary of the musical's premiere on Broadway, NBC aired a concert special, A Very Wicked Halloween: Celebrating 15 Years on Broadway, on October 29, 2018. Taped live from the Marquis Theatre in New York, the event was hosted by original stars Idina Menzel and Kristin Chenoweth, who also performed, and featured performances of the musical's songs by its current Broadway company, alongside Ariana Grande (who sings "The Wizard and I", though she portrayed Glinda in the films), Pentatonix, Adam Lambert, and Ledisi.

=== Wicked in Concert (2021) ===
PBS aired a Wicked concert special, once again hosted by Menzel and Chenoweth, on August 29, 2021. Performers included Cynthia Erivo (who eventually portrayed Elphaba in the films), Ariana DeBose, Gavin Creel, Ali Stroker, Amber Riley, Mario Cantone, Jennifer Nettles, Stephanie Hsu, Alex Newell, Isaac Cole Powell and Gabrielle Ruiz.

== Parodies ==
In 2013, the StarKid Productions musical Twisted premiered at Chicago's Greenhouse Theatre. It is a satiric retelling of the 1992 Disney animated film Aladdin from the point of view of its villain, Jafar, much like how Wicked retold the story of The Wonderful Wizard of Oz.

In 2014, the musical Wicked Frozen premiered at The People's Improv Theatre in New York City, satirizing both the musical Wicked and the 2013 Walt Disney Animation Studios film Frozen. Time Out magazine described the piece as "Like an ice capade infused with psychedelic drugs, this musical parody of Wicked and Frozen goes wild to hit every mark a fan could desire."

== Film adaptation ==
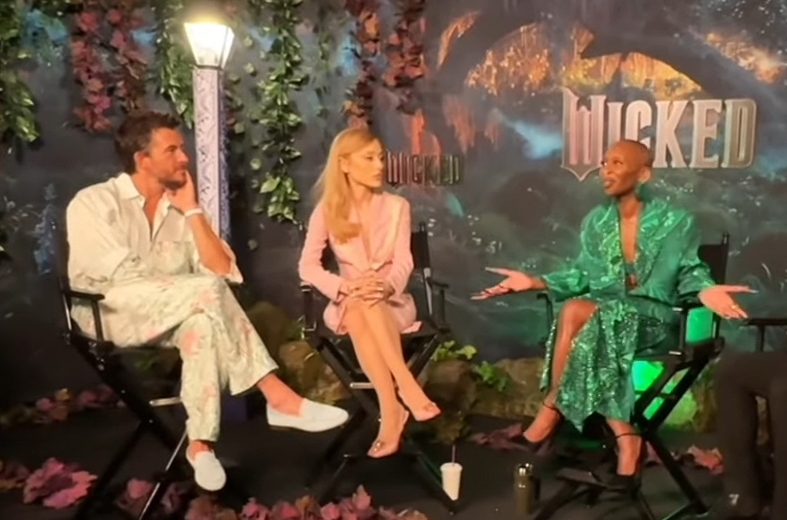
Jonathan Bailey, Ariana Grande, and Cynthia Erivo (L-R) play Fiyero, Glinda, and Elphaba respectively in the films

A film adaptation of Wicked had been discussed since 2004. By July 2012, Universal Studios was reported to be producing the film, with Stephen Daldry as director and Winnie Holzman, who wrote the musical's book, to pen the screenplay. Schwartz was later added as co-screenwriter. Production delays followed, postponing the release date, including due to the COVID-19 pandemic. In 2020, Daldry left the production due to scheduling conflicts, and Jon M. Chu signed on to direct in 2021. By 2022, Ariana Grande and Cynthia Erivo had been cast as Glinda and Elphaba respectively, with Jonathan Bailey as Fiyero. Filming began in June 2022 in the United Kingdom.

In 2022, Chu said that the film would be released in two parts, the first on November 22, 2024, and the second on November 21, 2025, to allow for more time to explore the characters and cover the source material more completely. The first film received critical praise and was commercially successful, becoming the highest-grossing musical film adaptation of all time. It became the first fantasy film and second musical film to win Best Film at the National Board of Review, and won Best Production Design and Best Costume Design at the 97th Academy Awards from eight other nominations, including Best Picture. The second film, also a box office success, received less enthusiastic reviews than its predecessor. (Note: Reviews were analyzed in articles published by the BBC, Forbes, Los Angeles Times, The Hollywood Reporter, Rotten Tomatoes, and Indie Wire.)

== In popular culture ==
The Broadway production of Wicked has been featured in episodes of television programs, including Brothers & Sisters, Rules of Engagement, The War at Home, Ugly Betty (in the episode "Something Wicked This Way Comes", in which Betty goes to see Wicked on a date.

In the Glee episode "Wheels," Rachel (Lea Michele) and Kurt (Chris Colfer) separately sing "Defying Gravity" in a competition for the lead solo. It was featured again in "100", the hundredth episode in the series.

In The Book of Mormon in the song "You and Me (But Mostly Me)", presents a rivals-to-friends story with some similarities to Elphaba and Glinda and ends with Elder Price imitating Elphaba's ending to "Defying Gravity". The theme and style of the song "Let It Go" from the 2013 Disney hit Frozen, sung by the original Elphaba, Idina Menzel, has been compared to "Defying Gravity".

== See also ==
- Politics in musicals
