= Jordan Litz =

American actor (born 1988)

- Born: February 18, 1988 (age 38)
- Occupations: actor and singer
- Known for: Fiyero

Jordan Litz (born February 18, 1988) is an American actor and singer, best known for his portrayal of Fiyero in the national tour, Broadway and West End productions of Wicked.

== Early life and education ==
Litz is originally from Stockton, California. He attended Lodi High School and Fresno Pacific University. He trained to be an Olympic swimmer, competing in the 2012 U.S. Olympic trials. He also worked as a vocal performer and a capella backing track recording artist.

== Career ==
Litz's performing career began with community theater productions of West Side Story and Dogfight in Fresno, CA, and Gaston in Beauty and the Beast. He then moved to Florida to perform at Walt Disney World.

Litz was originally cast in the national tour of Wicked in January 2020 as an ensemble member and understudy for Fiyero, before the tour was suspended during the COVID-19 pandemic. After the tour reopened in August 2021, Litz took over the role of Fiyero full-time on November 23, 2021 and performed on tour until February 5, 2023. Litz then transferred to the Broadway production at the Gershwin Theatre, making his Broadway debut as Fiyero on May 16, 2023. He performed as Fiyero at the show’s 20th anniversary performance on October 30, 2023, and left the production on March 1, 2026. With 1,073 performances on Broadway, he is the longest-running Fiyero in the history of the Broadway production. At the time of him leaving the Broadway production, he had completed 1,712 performances of Wicked across the tour and Broadway productions, although this number includes his time in the ensemble. It was then announced that Litz will make his West End debut, playing Fiyero at the Apollo Victoria Theatre starting from May 19, 2026, as part of the London production’s 20th anniversary. Litz's West End debut is part of an exchange program between the UK and US actors’ unions, as Carl Man had previously transferred from the West End production to replace Litz on Broadway. Man and Litz are the first actors to play Fiyero in both the Broadway and West End productions of Wicked.

In 2024, Litz starred in the Hallmark Channel Christmas movie, A Carol for Two.

== Personal life ==
Litz has two siblings. He taught himself how to play guitar in college. He met his wife while performing at Walt Disney World.

In 2025, Litz ran the New York City Marathon, and on the same day performed as Fiyero in the matinee and evening performances of Wicked.
