= Jemma Rix =

Australian theatre performer (born 1984)

- Born: Jemma Stevenson; 25 December 1984 (age 41); New South Wales, Australia
- Occupations: Singer, actress, theatre Performer
- Years active: 2006–present
- Spouse: Josh Rix (m. 2009)

Jemma Rix (née Stevenson; born 25 December 1984) is an Australian theatre performer, who has played the role of Elphaba in the Melbourne, Sydney, Australian and Asian touring companies of Wicked. Rix first performed the role in the shortened 30-minute version of the show at Universal Studios Japan. She was an original cast member of the Australian premiere production as the standby for Elphaba.

== Biography ==
Rix was born on the Central Coast of New South Wales. She participated in numerous amateur musical theatre productions from the age of 4. She began to perform throughout Sydney as the lead singer of a pop band at the age of 18. Rix then moved to Melbourne at the age of 21 to devote herself to musical theatre and was cast in a number of commercial projects.

Rix moved to Osaka, Japan after being cast as the Bride of Frankenstein in The Monster Rock and Roll Show at Universal Studios Japan. In July 2006, she was cast as Elphaba in the USJ mini version of the Broadway musical Wicked, which required her to perform parts of the show in Japanese. Throughout the audition process, she met and performed for Stephen Schwartz, Winnie Holzman and Marc Platt. She performed in this role for a year before returning to Melbourne.

Rix was cast as the standby for Elphaba in the Australian premiere of Wicked which opened in Melbourne on 12 July 2008 and ran through 9 August 2009. The show was then transferred to Sydney, opening on 12 September 2009. Due to the illness of Amanda Harrison, Rix had many opportunities to perform the role of Elphaba, and on 9 February 2010, after an extended leave of absence, Harrison announced that she would not be returning to the show. The role was then offered to Rix, who continued to share it with Australian theatre actress Pippa Grandison. They starred alongside Lucy Durack in the role of Glinda. Rix generally performed in four of eight shows a week, with the remaining four played by Grandison and later, Patrice Tipoki.

Rix continued to be the first billed Elphaba, featuring on displays outside the theatre and appearing at most events and press interviews. These included the 2008 Carols by Candlelight, Melbourne's Federation Square and Town Hall, 2009 Australian Ethnic Business Awards, 2009 QANTAS Business Awards, AFL pre-match entertainment performances, the ANZ Rob Guest Endowment Fund Concert, the Kerri-Anne Kennerley morning TV show, Sydney's Carols in the Domain 2009, the 2010 Telethon, and the 2010 Carols by Candlelight. Wicked closed in Sydney on 26 September 2010, with Rix playing Elphaba.

Rix again played the role of Elphaba on the show's first Australian Tour, which, after delays due to flooding, began in Brisbane on 25 January 2011.

In 2011, Rix was nominated for a Helpmann Award for "Best Female Actor in a Musical" for her portrayal as Elphaba in Wicked.

Rix played Elphaba again on the Asian tour of Wicked, which began in Singapore from 7 December 2011. After a four-month engagement there, the tour visited Seoul. Previous Australian understudy Suzie Mathers took over the role of Glinda full-time at the start of the Asian tour.

Rix reprised her role as Elphaba in Auckland, New Zealand as of 21 September 2013 at the Auckland Civic Theatre. After Auckland she traveled to Manila, Philippines to perform there. Rix continued to play the role for the 10th Anniversary return tour in Australia, performing in Melbourne, Sydney, Brisbane and Perth. During the tour, she reached a milestone by performing the role of Elphaba for 1000th time in October 2014.

It was announced mid 2015 that Rix would play the role Lucy, in the Australian production of Jekyll & Hyde the musical, however the production has been postponed indefinitely. Rix went on to play the role of Molly Jensen in the Australian tour of Ghost the Musical.

In 2017, it was announced that Rix will appear in the Australian tour of Andrew Lloyd Webber's updated version of The Wizard of Oz.

In 2017, Jemma played the role of Teen Angel in the Australian arena production of the musical Grease (musical) when it toured to Adelaide and Newcastle.

In mid 2018, Jemma joined the cast of Opera Australia's 'Evita' in the role of Eva Perón. She performed this role in Melbourne and Sydney.

In October and November 2019, Jemma starred as Lucy in Jekyll & Hyde with Anthony Warlow and the Melbourne Symphony Orchestra.

It was announced on 15 February 2020 that Rix will play the role of Elsa in the Australian production of Frozen in Sydney alongside Courtney Monsma as Anna.

== Personal life ==
Rix married Josh Rix on 2 February 2009, and they live in Melbourne.

== Theatre credits ==
Year	Production	Role	Venue	Dates	Notes	Ref.
2008	Wicked	Elphaba standby	Melbourne			
2009	Wicked	Elphaba standby	Sydney			
2010	Wicked	Elphaba	Sydney			
2011	Wicked	Elphaba	Australian Tour (Brisbane, Adelaide & Perth)			
2012	Wicked	Elphaba	Singapore & South Korea (Seoul)			
2013	Wicked	Elphaba	New Zealand (Auckland)			
2014	Wicked	Elphaba	Philippines (Manila)			
2014	Wicked	Elphaba	Regent Theatre, Melbourne	10 May 2014 – 7 September 2014	10th anniversary Australian return tour	
2014	Wicked	Elphaba	Capitol Theatre, Sydney	20 September 2014 – January 2015	10th anniversary Australian return tour	
2015	Wicked	Elphaba	Queensland Performing Arts Centre, Brisbane	12 February 2015 – 12 April 2015	10th anniversary Australian return tour	
2015	Wicked	Elphaba	Crown Theatre, Perth	3 May 2015 – 28 June 2015	10th anniversary Australian return tour	
2016	Ghost the Musical	Molly Jensen	Australian tour (Adelaide, Melbourne, Sydney, Perth)			
2017–2018	The Wizard of Oz	Wicked Witch of the West / Miss Gulch	Australian tour			
2017	Grease: The Arena Experience	Teen Angel	Adelaide, Newcastle			
2018–2019	Evita	Eva Perón alternate	Australian tour			
2019	Jekyll & Hyde	Lucy	Melbourne			
2020–2021	Frozen	Elsa	Capitol Theatre, Sydney	1 December 2020 – 23 May 2021	Original Australian cast	
2021–2022	Frozen	Elsa	Her Majesty's Theatre, Melbourne	14 July 2021 – 26 January 2022	Original Australian cast	
2022	Frozen	Elsa	Queensland Performing Arts Centre, Brisbane	12 February 2022 – 8 May 2022	Original Australian cast	
2022	Frozen	Elsa	Adelaide Festival Centre, Adelaide	26 May 2022 – 7 August 2022	Original Australian cast	
2022	Frozen	Elsa	Crown Theatre, Perth	25 August 2022 – 13 November 2022	Original Australian cast	
2023	Frozen	Elsa	Marina Bay Sands, Singapore	5 February 2023 – 19 March 2023	Original Australian cast	
2024	Wicked	Elphaba	Regent Theatre, Melbourne	5 June 2024	Guest artist (emergency cover)	
2024	Wicked	Elphaba	Regent Theatre, Melbourne	14 August 2024	Guest artist (emergency cover)	
2024	Wicked	Elphaba	Lyric Theatre, Queensland Performing Arts Centre, Brisbane	23 November 2024	Guest artist (emergency cover)	
2025	The Lord of the Rings: A Musical Tale	Galadriel	State Theatre, Sydney	7 January 2025 –		
2025	The Lord of the Rings: A Musical Tale	Galadriel	Crown Theatre, Perth	19 March 2025 –		
2025	The Lord of the Rings: A Musical Tale	Galadriel	Comedy Theatre, Melbourne	26 April 2025 –		

== Awards ==
Year	Award	Category	Role	Production	Result	Ref(s)
2011	Helpmann Awards	Best Female Actor in a Musical	Elphaba	Wicked	Nominated	
2018	Helpmann Awards	Best Female Actor in a Supporting Role in a Musical	Wicked Witch of the West	The Wizard of Oz	Nominated	
