= Mean Girls (2024 film) =

Film by Samantha Jayne and Arturo Perez Jr.

- Theatrical release poster
- Directed by: Samantha Jayne; Arturo Perez Jr.
- Screenplay by: Tina Fey
- Based on: Mean Girls by; Jeff Richmond; Nell Benjamin; Tina Fey; Queen Bees and Wannabes by Rosalind Wiseman
- Produced by: Lorne Michaels; Tina Fey
- Starring: Angourie Rice; Reneé Rapp; Auliʻi Cravalho; Christopher Briney
- Cinematography: Bill Kirstein
- Edited by: Andrew Marcus
- Music by: Jeff Richmond
- Production companies: Broadway Video; Little Stranger
- Distributed by: Paramount Pictures
- Release dates: January 8, 2024 (New York City); January 12, 2024 (United States)
- Running time: 112 minutes
- Country: United States
- Language: English
- Budget: $36 million
- Box office: $105 million

Mean Girls is a 2024 American musical teen comedy film directed by Samantha Jayne and Arturo Perez Jr. from a screenplay written by Tina Fey. It is the third film in the Mean Girls franchise and based on the stage musical of the same name, which in turn was based on the 2004 film (both also written by Fey), itself based on Rosalind Wiseman's 2002 book Queen Bees and Wannabes. It stars Angourie Rice, Reneé Rapp, Auliʻi Cravalho, and Christopher Briney. Fey and Tim Meadows reprise their roles from the original film.

Paramount Pictures announced the film's development in January 2020, with Fey returning to write the screenplay and serve as a producer alongside Lorne Michaels, who produced the 2004 film. Composer Jeff Richmond and lyricist Nell Benjamin returned to rework their songs from the stage musical, while Richmond also composed the film's score. Casting began in December 2022. Principal photography took place in New Jersey between March and April 2023. Originally set for release on the streaming service Paramount+, Paramount Pictures opted to release the film theatrically after positive test screenings.

Mean Girls premiered at the AMC Lincoln Square in New York City on January 8, 2024, and was released in the United States by Paramount Pictures on January 12. The film grossed over $105 million worldwide on a $36 million budget and received mixed reviews.

== Plot ==
Sixteen-year-old homeschooled Cady Heron moves back to the United States from Kenya with her mother and attends North Shore High School. She befriends Janis ʻImiʻike and Damian Hubbard, who introduce her to the various cliques, warning her to avoid the Plastics, who consist of the insecure gossiper Gretchen Wieners, unintelligent and bubbly Karen Shetty, and manipulative "queen bee" Regina George. When Regina invites Cady to join their group, Janis uses this as an opportunity to convince Cady to infiltrate the group for her.

Cady becomes attracted to Aaron Samuels, a senior in her calculus class and Regina's ex-boyfriend. Gretchen and Karen warn her that he is off-limits as he has dated Regina. While at Regina's house with the Plastics, they show Cady their "Burn Book", a scrapbook they have filled with cruel content about students and staff at the school including Janis, Damian and Ms Norbury.

Cady tells Janis and Damian about the Burn Book, and they explain that Janis and Regina were once friends, but fell out after Regina spread a rumor about Janis being a lesbian. Despite being mathematically skilled, Cady begins to intentionally fail math to get closer to Aaron, who offers to tutor her. He eventually invites her to his Halloween party. Regina discovers Cady's crush on Aaron and, in a fit of jealousy, flirts with Aaron before kissing him in front of Cady. Realizing Janis was right about Regina, she agrees to commit to her plan to ruin her reputation.

Cady tricks Regina into eating weight-gain Kälteen Bars to lose weight and replaces her face cream with lard. The trio target Gretchen's insecurities by having a Candy Cane-Gram sent to Cady on Regina's behalf, making Gretchen believe Regina has replaced her as her best friend. Gretchen reveals Regina's secrets to Cady, including her cheating on Aaron with football player Shane Oman. Regina's reputation takes a further hit after a disastrous performance at the Winter Talent Show leads to viral embarrassment. With Regina's social status plummeting, Cady becomes the new "queen bee".

Janis invites Cady to her art show, but she lies, saying she has to travel with her mother to Madison. However, Cady convinces her mother to let her stay home and secretly throws a house party, where she drunkenly admits to Aaron that she has been deliberately failing math to get closer to him. He rebukes Cady for becoming as manipulative as Regina and storms out. When she follows him, she is confronted by Janis, who calls her out on being as catty as Regina. Cady in turn calls out Janis for being obsessed with her, leading to Janis renouncing their friendship.

Enraged upon discovering that she was not invited to the party and that Cady lied about the Kälteen Bars, Regina adds herself into the Burn Book as an alibi and deliberately drops it in the school hallway. A riot breaks out among the junior girls over the rumors inside. Principal Duvall and math teacher Ms. Norbury call the junior girls into the gymnasium to find the book's source. Ms. Norbury stages a cathartic intervention, encouraging the girls to apologize to each other about their treatment of others. Janis speaks out and reveals the plan to take revenge on Regina, who storms out in anger. Cady races after her to try to apologize, but after ranting at her, Regina is hit by a bus, which breaks her spine.

Cady realizes the damage she has done and takes full responsibility for the book, leading her to be suspended for three weeks and placed on absolute final warning. Ms. Norbury offers Cady a way to earn extra credit by joining the Mathletes at state championships, so Cady redeems herself by helping the team win. At the Spring Fling, Cady reconciles with Regina and is elected Spring Fling Queen, but breaks the plastic crown and distributes the pieces out to the other girls, telling them they are all special in their own way. She apologizes to Janis and Damian, who accept her back as their friend, and makes amends with the Plastics and Aaron, who kisses her.

== Cast ==
- Angourie Rice as Cady Heron, a teenage girl who transfers to North Shore High School after being homeschooled her whole life in Kenya
- Reneé Rapp as Regina George, a rich and popular mean girl who is the leader of the Plastics
- Auliʻi Cravalho as Janis ʻImiʻike, Cady and Damian's friend
- Jaquel Spivey as Damian Hubbard, Janis's best friend
- Avantika Vandanapu as Karen Shetty, a member of the Plastics
- Bebe Wood as Gretchen Wieners, a member of the Plastics
- Christopher Briney as Aaron Samuels, Regina's ex-boyfriend and Cady's love interest
- Jenna Fischer as Ms. Heron, Cady's mother
- Busy Philipps as Mrs. George, Regina's mother
- Tina Fey as Ms. Norbury, the math teacher at North Shore High School
- Tim Meadows as Mr. Duvall, the principal of North Shore High School
- Mahi Alam as Kevin Ganatra, a Mathlete student based on Kevin Gnapoor from the original film.

Additionally, Lindsay Lohan, who played Cady Heron in the 2004 film, makes a cameo as the moderator of the Mathletes tournament, while Jon Hamm plays Coach Carr, the school's physical education teacher. Ashley Park, who originated the role of Gretchen in the stage musical, appears as Madame Park, the school French teacher. Connor Ratliff portrays Mr. Rapp, the school literature teacher. Megan Thee Stallion appears as herself during the social media montages in the film. In the same montage, Jazz Jennings has a cameo as a Social Media Friend.

== Production ==
=== Development ===
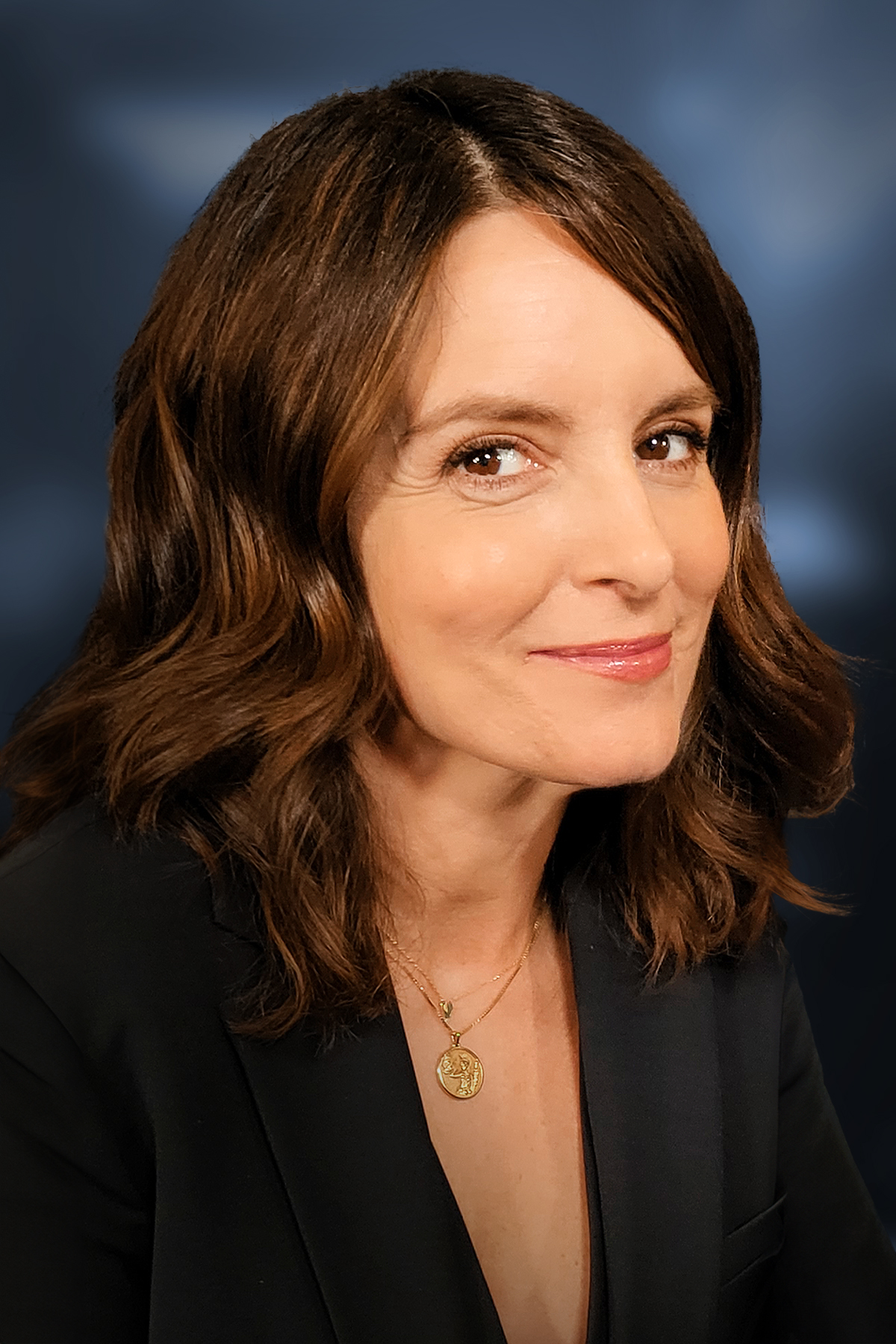
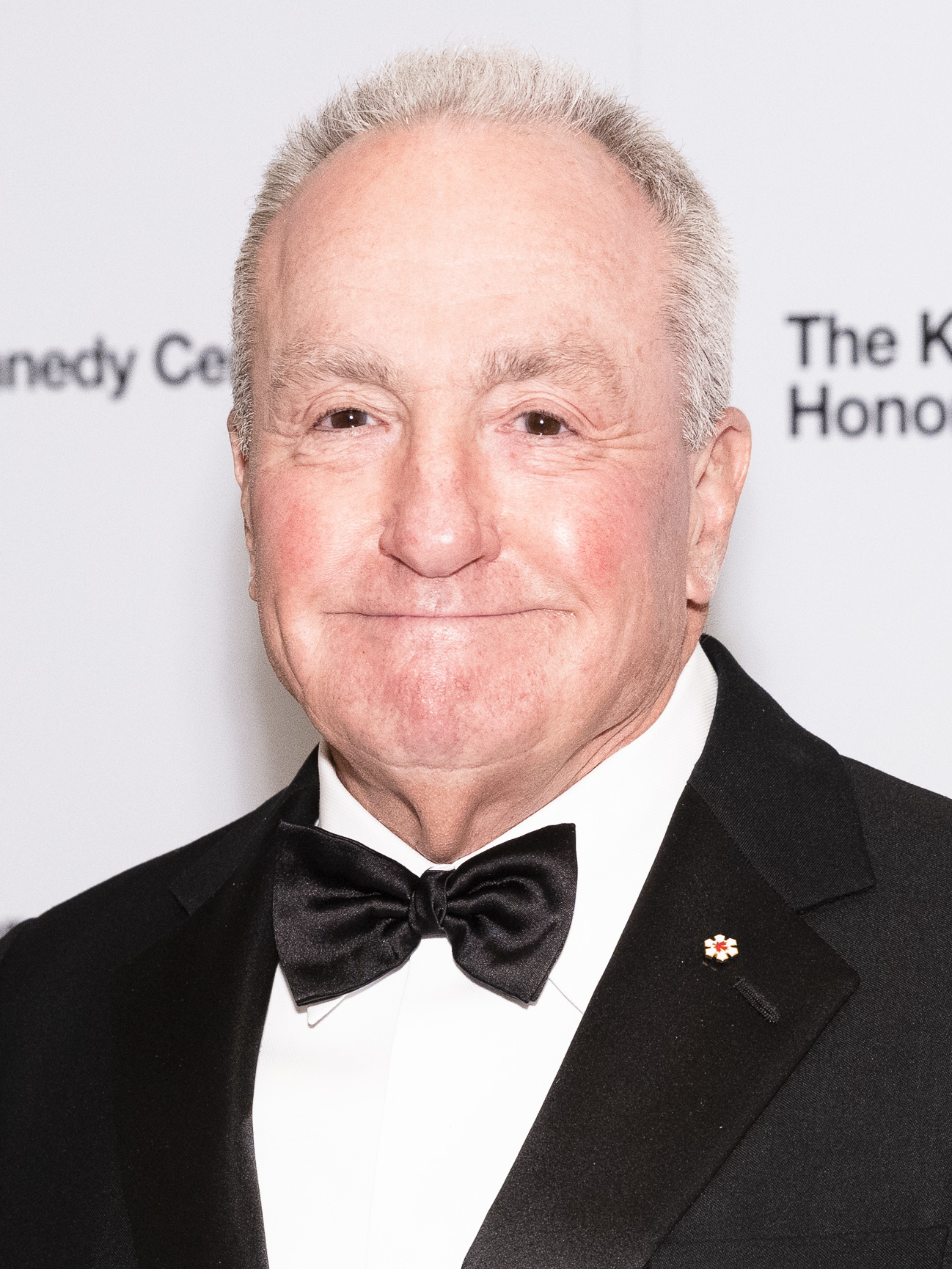
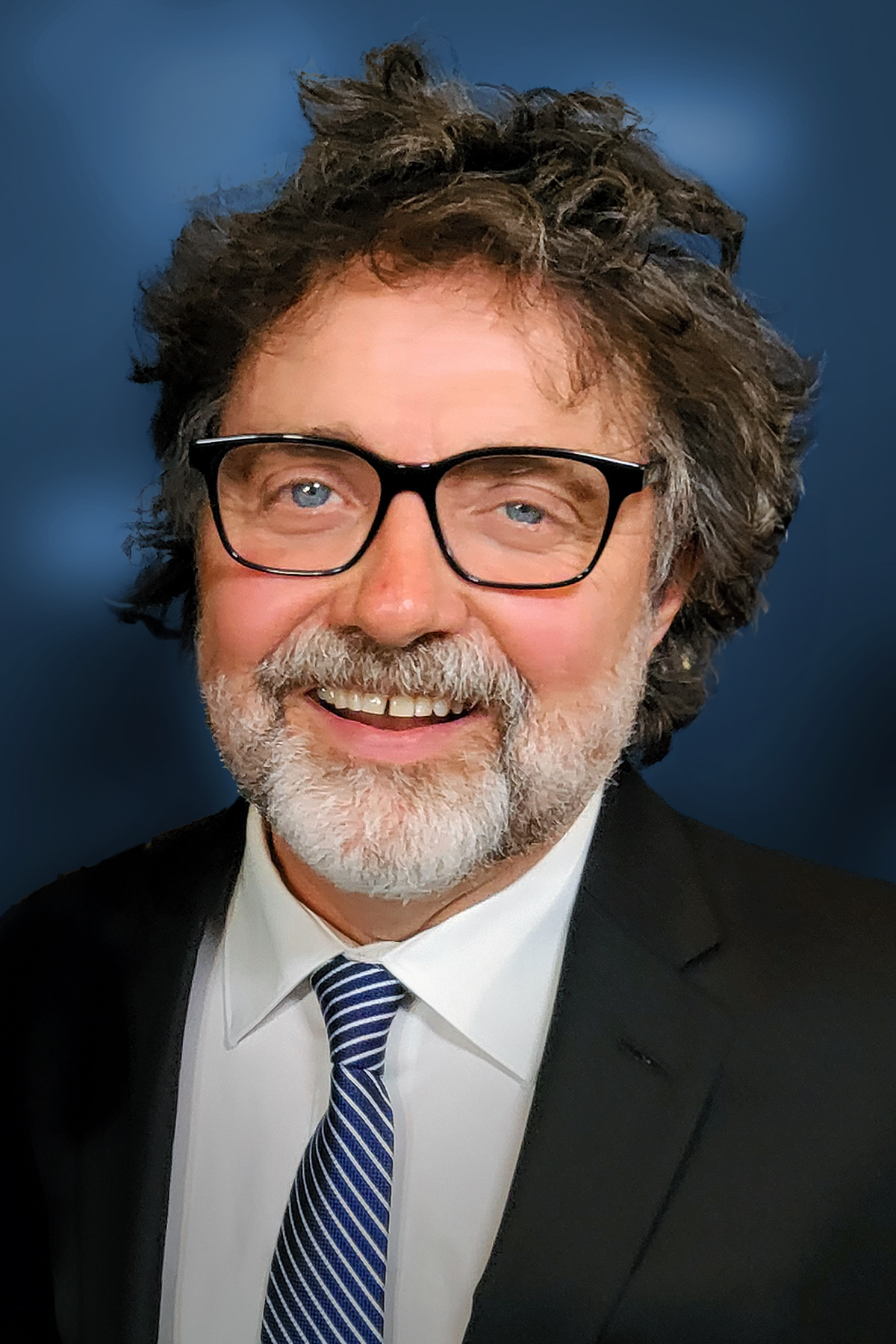
Screenwriter/producer Tina Fey (left), producer Lorne Michaels and composer Jeff Richmond all reunited to adapt the stage musical for the screen.

In 2013, Tina Fey announced that a stage musical adaptation of Mean Girls was in the works. The musical premiered in 2017 in Washington, D.C., and later transferred to Broadway at the August Wilson Theatre in 2018. Fey wrote the book of the show, while her husband, Jeff Richmond, composed the music with lyrics written by Nell Benjamin. The show received positive reviews from critics, and was nominated for twelve awards at the 72nd Tony Awards, including Best Musical.

In January 2020, Fey stated that a film adaptation of the stage musical was in active development. In September 2021, Arturo Perez Jr. and Samantha Jayne signed on to direct, making the film their feature film directorial debuts. Paramount Players was also announced to produce the film. It was also confirmed that Lorne Michaels, who produced the original film, would return to produce the musical film under Broadway Video, alongside Fey's Little Stranger.

=== Casting ===
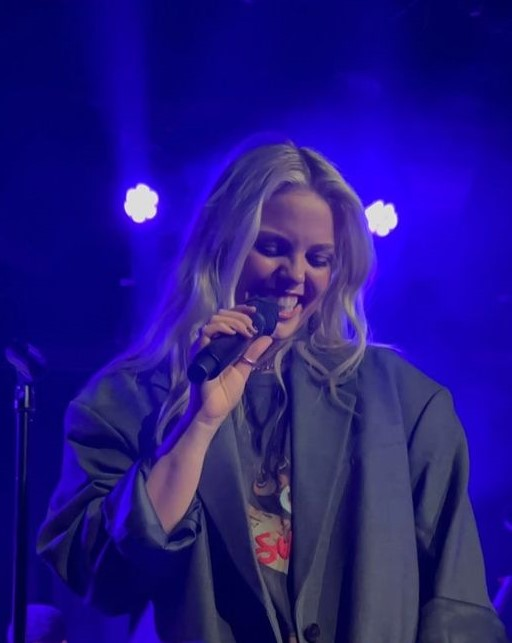
Reneé Rapp, who had previously portrayed Regina George in Mean Girls on Broadway, reprised her role for the film.

During the original film's cast reunion on October 3, 2020, Tina Fey shared that fans could be involved in casting actors for the film by sharing their dream cast on the project's website and be featured in the musical film's "burn book". In May 2021, she suggested to Variety that the original cast members of the stage musical would likely not reprise their roles.

In December 2022, Angourie Rice, Auliʻi Cravalho, and Jaquel Spivey were cast in the roles of Cady, Janis, and Damian, while Reneé Rapp, who previously portrayed Regina as the replacement for original Broadway cast-member Taylor Louderman in the stage musical from 2019 until its closure in 2020, would reprise her role.

In February 2023, it was announced that the roles of Aaron, Gretchen, and Karen would be played by Christopher Briney, Bebe Wood, and Avantika Vandanapu, respectively. Briney originally turned down the role of Aaron upon learning about the role's requirement to sing, but eventually accepted it when the songs he was involved in were cut from the film. Fey and Tim Meadows were added to the cast to reprise their roles from the original film, Ms. Norbury and Principal Duvall. Jenna Fischer joined the cast as Ms. Heron, Cady's mother, while Busy Philipps was announced to portray Mrs. George, Regina's mother. Additionally, it was reported that Ashley Park, who originated the role of Gretchen in the stage musical, will have a cameo in the film. In March 2023, Mahi Alam, Connor Ratliff, and Jon Hamm joined as Kevin, Mr. Rapp, and Coach Carr, respectively.

In December 2023, Rachel McAdams revealed to Variety that she and Fey discussed the possibility of a cameo in the film, but it ultimately did not work out. Fey said, "Paramount was like, 'Can you get any of the original ladies? And I was like, 'I can't fit five people in,'" and talked about her decision to include Lindsay Lohan in the film: "I felt like if I could only get one person as a surprise, the original movie is really Lindsay's movie. As great as they all are, she's the heart of that movie. And I thought, well, what could she do? I didn't think [she should] play a teacher. I was trying to think of something that you wouldn't expect. And just to have her do that late in the movie, it also feels like it comes, I hope, at a time where fans weren't expecting one more little surprise. It also lets her be smart, which Cady is." Variety reported that Lohan was paid $500,000 for her cameo.

=== Filming ===
Principal photography took place at the building of the defunct Mater Dei High School in Middletown Township, New Jersey, from March to April 2023.

=== Differences between stage and film versions ===
To make the story's musical form translate to the screen, changes were made to shorten the runtime compared to the stage show's two-and-a-half-hour length and to adjust certain plot elements, such as shortening the length of some of the musical numbers. Like the stage show, this film takes place during the social media age, with the incorporation of social media and mobile technology into the plot.

Fourteen songs were cut for the film, including "Where Do You Belong?", "Fearless", "Stop", "Whose House Is This?", "More Is Better", and "Do This Thing", along with the reprise of "What's Wrong with Me?". A new song, "What Ifs", was written to replace "It Roars", the introductory song for Cady in the stage version. Both the stage musical and the film feature a reprise of "Stupid with Love", however, the two versions are completely different. In the musical, the reprise is performed by Cady and Aaron when she starts to act stupid to talk more with him. In the film, the number is performed by Cady and the ensemble during the mathematics competition, replacing "Do This Thing".

"Rockin' Around the Pole", a song cut from the stage musical but still used in it as a short snippet before a full version was released later as a single, is also used in the film, replacing "Jingle Bell Rock", which was used during the same scene in the 2004 film.

== Music ==
Jeff Richmond and Nell Benjamin returned to rework their songs from the stage musical for the adaptation, while Richmond also composed the film's score. Alongside Richmond and Benjamin, Reneé Rapp co-wrote, "What Ifs", a new song for Cady, replacing "It Roars" from the stage production. Other songs removed from the original score include "Where Do You Belong?", "Fearless", "Stop", "Whose House Is This?", "More Is Better", and "Do This Thing".

=== Soundtrack ===
The film's soundtrack was released on January 12, 2024, by Interscope Records. The album features twelve musical numbers from the film, and the track "Not My Fault" by Rapp and Megan Thee Stallion, previously released as a single on December 15, 2023. It is the only song from the soundtrack that is not used as a musical number in the film, and plays during the end credits scene.

The reprises versions of "Someone Gets Hurt" and "Stupid with Love", and the musicals numbers "Laissez Moi Tout" and "Rockin' Around the Pole", were released as part of the deluxe edition of the soundtrack, titled Bonus Track Version, released on February 20, 2024.

=== Musical numbers ===
- "A Cautionary Tale" – Janis and Damian
- "What Ifs" – Cady
- "Meet the Plastics" – Regina
- "Stupid with Love" – Cady and Ensemble
- "Apex Predator" – Janis and Damian
- "What's Wrong with Me?" – Gretchen
- "Sexy" – Karen and Female Ensemble
- "Someone Gets Hurt" – Regina
- "Revenge Party" – Janis, Damian, Cady, Principal Duvall and Ensemble
- "Laissez Moi Tout (iCarly Theme Song)"† – Damian
- "Kevin G's Rap"†† – Kevin and the Power of 3
- "Rockin' Around the Pole Again"† – Santa's Little Helpers
- "Someone Gets Hurt (Reprise)"† – Janis, Cady and Damian
- "World Burn" – Regina and Female Ensemble
- "I'd Rather Be Me" – Janis and Female Ensemble
- "Stupid with Love (Reprise)"† – Cady, Prom Band and Company
- "I See Stars" – Cady, Prom Band and Company

† denotes songs absent from the standard edition of the soundtrack.
†† denotes songs absent from all versions of the soundtrack.

== Release ==
=== Theatrical ===
Mean Girls was originally set for a streaming-only release on Paramount+ but was switched to a theatrical release in September 2023, after positive test scores. The film had its world premiere in New York City on January 8, 2024, and was released in the United States on January 12 by Paramount Pictures.

Internationally, the film was first released in selected territories on January 10, 2024. It was followed by Australia on January 11, and by the United Kingdom on January 17.

=== Home media ===
Mean Girls was released digitally on February 20, 2024. The film began streaming on Paramount+ on March 5, and was released on Ultra HD Blu-ray, Blu-ray and DVD on April 30 by Paramount Home Entertainment.

== Reception ==
=== Box office ===
Mean Girls grossed $72.4 million in the United States and Canada, and $32.4 million in other territories, for a worldwide total of $104.8 million.

In the United States and Canada, Mean Girls was released on January 12, 2024, alongside The Beekeeper and The Book of Clarence, and was projected to gross $27–30 million from 3,791 theaters in its opening weekend, which included the Martin Luther King Jr. Day holiday. It made $11.6 million on its first day, including $3.25 million from Thursday night previews. It went on to debut to $28.65 million (and $33.2 million over the four days), topping the box office; 75% of the audience was female, with 34% being between 26 and 35 years old. The film made $11.7 million in its second weekend and $6.9 million in its third weekend, remaining first in the box office for three consecutive weeks. It was finally dethroned in its fourth weekend, grossing $3.8 million and falling to sixth.

Internationally, it launched in only a few major markets on January 12, but came in number one in Australia and Mexico. In the United Kingdom and Ireland, where it released on a Wednesday, January 17, it also opened at number one and held the top spot in the following weekend.

=== Critical response ===
Reviews for Mean Girls were mixed. On the review aggregator website Rotten Tomatoes, 69% of 248 critics' reviews are positive, with an average rating of 6.2/10. The website's consensus reads: "Preserving the essence of the original while adding a few new wrinkles – not to mention musical numbers – Mean Girls is a sweet (if slight) update with an outstanding cast." Metacritic, which uses a weighted average, assigned the film a score of 58 out of 100, based on 47 critics, indicating "mixed or average" reviews. Audiences polled by CinemaScore gave the film an average grade of "B" on an A+ to F scale, while those polled by PostTrak gave it a 70% overall positive score.

Maureen Lee Lenker of Entertainment Weekly wrote, "As it did in 2004, Mean Girls is a playground for a melange of fresh, new talent for whom we hope the limit does not exist". Kate Erbland of IndieWire wrote, "Jayne and Perez's Mean Girls treads a fine line with relative ease: give something to older fans, and earn some new ones in the process". Owen Gleiberman of Variety wrote, "The songs carry you through, with the cross-cutting fireworks of 'Revenge Party' being a particular highlight." Carla Meyer of San Francisco Chronicle wrote, "The songs are mid and some story elements aged like Juicy Couture, but the acting and singing are totally fetch in the new movie musical version of Mean Girls". Michael Phillips of The Chicago Tribune wrote, "The core of Fey's storyline hasn't changed, even if technology has. It embraces, with trace elements of sincerity, the juicy comic extremes of mean-girldom, complete with an 11th-hour repudiation and a reminder to be nicer. Before it's too late". Michael O'Sullivan of The Washington Post wrote, "There's lots of fun to be had, in a show that rhymes nonplussed with calcu-lust. And yet, like its predecessors, this Mean Girls has bite". BJ Colangelo of /Film wrote, "Mean Girls is an entirely different animal compared to the apex predator of the original film, but it holds its own in the constantly evolving biosphere of teen cinema". Kevin Harley of Total Film wrote, "[An] enjoyable but safe musical redo...it's the old Mean Girls with smartphones, essentially, with an attendant risk of redundancy".

David Rooney of The Hollywood Reporter wrote, "All the effervescence and fun have been drained out of the material in this labored reincarnation, a movie musical made by people who appear to have zero understanding of movie-musical vernacular". Valerie Complex of Deadline Hollywood wrote, "the film struggles to justify its existence beyond surface-level changes and ultimately falters in delivering a coherent, impactful story that offers little new or compelling". David Fear of Rolling Stone wrote, "No one's expecting the second coming of MGM's Freed Unit here, but dear god, transforming Mean Girls: The Musical into a hot mess was definitely not on our wish list". Kristen Lopez of TheWrap wrote, "It's a sanitized, CliffsNotes version of the original with a few songs thrown in. It'll be great for audiences to see Renee [sic] Rapp, if they don't know of her already, but she's not in it enough to help save the rest of the film". Tom Gliatto of People wrote, "The musical numbers are mostly bright, brash and frequently awful. The songs just keep coming at you, noisily whirring with speed and determined to make maximum impact".

=== Accolades ===
Organizations	Ceremony date	Category	Recipient(s)	Result	Ref.
AACTA Awards	February 10, 2024	Audience Choice Award for Favourite Film	Mean Girls	Nominated	
The Queerty Awards	March 12, 2024	Comedy Movie	Mean Girls	Nominated	
Webby Awards	April 23, 2024	People's Voice Award	Mean Girls	Won	
Chita Rivera Awards	May 20, 2024	Outstanding Choreography in a Feature Film	Kyle Hanagami	Nominated	
Nickelodeon Kids' Choice Awards	July 13, 2024	Favorite Villain	Reneé Rapp	Nominated	
The ReFrame Stamp	March 26, 2025	Top 100 Narrative Feature Recipients	Mean Girls	Won	
GLAAD Media Awards	March 27, 2025	Outstanding Film – Wide Release	Mean Girls	Nominated	
Webby Awards	April 22, 2025	Best Overall Social Presence	Mean Girls	Nominated	
Shorty Awards	May 22, 2025	Integrated Campaign	Mean Girls	Nominated	
