= Mary Kate Morrissey =

American stage actress and singer (born 1989)

- Born: June 18, 1989 (age 36); Downingtown, Pennsylvania
- Education: Bishop Shanahan High School
- Alma mater: Syracuse University
- Occupations: Stage actress, acting and voice instructor
- Years active: 2013–present
- Known for: Mean Girls musical Wicked musical
- Spouse: Trevor Blake (m. 2021)
- Father: John Morrissey

Mary Kate Morrissey (born June 18, 1989) is an American stage actress. Born in Pennsylvania, Morrissey began her career when she starred as Sheila in the musical Hair and Janis in the Mean Girls musical. She played Elphaba on the national tour of Wicked before serving as the Elphaba standby on Broadway and eventually taking on the role full-time.

== Early life ==
Mary Kate Morrissey was born in Downingtown, Pennsylvania on June 18, 1989. Her father is John Morrissey, a founding partner at Jackson Cross Partners. She has Irish ancestry. When asked how she decided what career path she wanted to follow, Morrissey said, "My grandfather used to sing on the Irish Radio and play in a band, and my dad would dress us up like the Rolling Stones when my brothers and sister and I were little and we would put on full-blown lip sync concerts. My parents recognized the performer bug in me and put me in the local high school's production of Joseph and the Technicolor Dreamcoat, where my second-grade self played a sheep!"

As a child, Morrissey learned how to play the trombone. In her later school years, she took voice lessons and joined numerous choirs such as the Philadelphia All Catholic Chorus and her high school band. She attended Bishop Shanahan High School in Downington, Pennsylvania and later attended Syracuse University, where she achieved a Bachelor of Fine Arts Degree in Musical Theater. While at Syracuse University, Morrissey played Meg March in a musical version of the novel Little Women.

Morrissey saw Shoshana Bean and Megan Hilty act in Wicked on Broadway sometime around 2004. Since then, she has been a fan of the musical.

== Career ==
=== 2013-2014: Debut ===
Morrissey's acting debut was in 2013, when she played Sheila in Broadway's US and Canada tour of Hair. That same year, Morrissey attended the 2013 Emery Awards in New York City alongside Ty Defoe. Morrissey acted in Tamar of the River at the Baruch Performing Arts Center in 2013. In 2014, Morrissey played Sharon Falconer in a play of Elmer Gantry at Signature Theatre in Arlington, Virginia and Lizzie Borden in Portland Center Stage's rock musical, Lizzie by Tim Maner, Steven Cheslik-DeMeyer, and Alan Stevens Hewitt.

=== 2015-2020: Off-Broadway shows and acting coaching ===
In 2015, Morrissey served as the standby for Elphaba on the national tour of Wicked. She began to play the role full-time in 2017 alongside Ginna Claire Mason as Glinda until 2018. During this time, Morrissey and Mason developed a strong friendship. Morrissey performed songs from Wicked at Side By Side: A Celebration of Service on May 25, 2019, in New York City to celebrate veterans of the United States Army and their families.

Morrissey played Janis Sarkisian in the Mean Girls musical national tour in 2019. That same year, Morrissey served as a standby for Joan and Isabelle on the set of the musical Joan of Arc: Into the Fire. Also in 2019, Morrissey played Sara, the Magician's Lovely Assistant in The Disappearing Man at the Stavros Niarchos Foundation Rehearsal Studio.

During the COVID-19 pandemic, Morrissey and Mason began Double Name Witches, a virtual theater and voice school for people ages 5–30. The program targets students who aspire to act on Broadway. The program turned out to be successful, as Morrissey and Mason received over 100 students. Morrissey has taught several masterclasses and theater programs for aspiring actors across America. As well as online teaching, Morrissey teaches private lessons from her Brooklyn studio.

=== 2023-present: Broadway and further acting ===
In 2023, Morrissey became the official standby for Elphaba on Broadway. On March 5, 2024, she began playing the role full-time alongside Alexandra Socha as Glinda. Morrissey replaced Alyssa Fox as Elphaba, and Socha replaced McKenzie Kurtz as Glinda.

In 2024, Morrissey performed "Defying Gravity" at New York City Pride while donning a shirt that read "Here, Queer, and Wicked".

Morrissey confessed to initially having doubts about whether she could play Elphaba fulltime, but her family supported her along the way and she eventually got her dream. She played the role until March 2, 2025. and was replaced by Lencia Kebede.

Morrissey was cast as Beverly/Anette in the Come from Away production at the Ogunquit Playhouse in Maine. Her first performance as Beverly/Anette was on May 15, 2025, and her last performance was on June 14, 2025. She played Elsa in Paper Mill Playhouse's stage production of Frozen from November 2025 to January 2026.

== Personal life ==
Morrissey has been vegan since 2012.

In 2021, Morrissey revealed she had married her longtime boyfriend, Trevor Blake. She owns a puppy named Bear.

Morrissey identifies as queer and is an advocate for queer rights and representation.

Morrissey is also an avid golfer and has a new video series on her YouTube called Broadway to Birdie where she plays a few rounds of golf with other performers who she's worked with to bridge artists to sports as well.
