= Damian Leigh =

Fictional character

In-universe information
- Nationality: American

Damian Leigh (known as Damian Hubbard in the musical adaptation) is a fictional character from the Mean Girls franchise. He was portrayed by actors Daniel Franzese, Grey Henson, and Jaquel Spivey in the original film (2004), 2017 musical and its subsequent film adaptation in 2024, respectively.

== Description ==
The character Damian has appeared in the film Mean Girls (2004) and subsequent adaptations. He is the best friend of Janis Ian, who describes him as "too gay to function". He has also been called sarcastic. Dessi Gomez of TheWrap has said Damian "stands by Janis' side through thick and thin, as she does with him. He manages to be in on all the girl drama just as much as guy drama around North Shore High. His talents, as showcased in the winter talent show, will take him far."

== Roles and portrayals ==
Social outcasts Damian and Janis teach new student Cady Heron about various cliques at the school and caution her about the "Plastics"—Regina George, Gretchen Wieners, and Karen Smith.

=== 2004 film ===
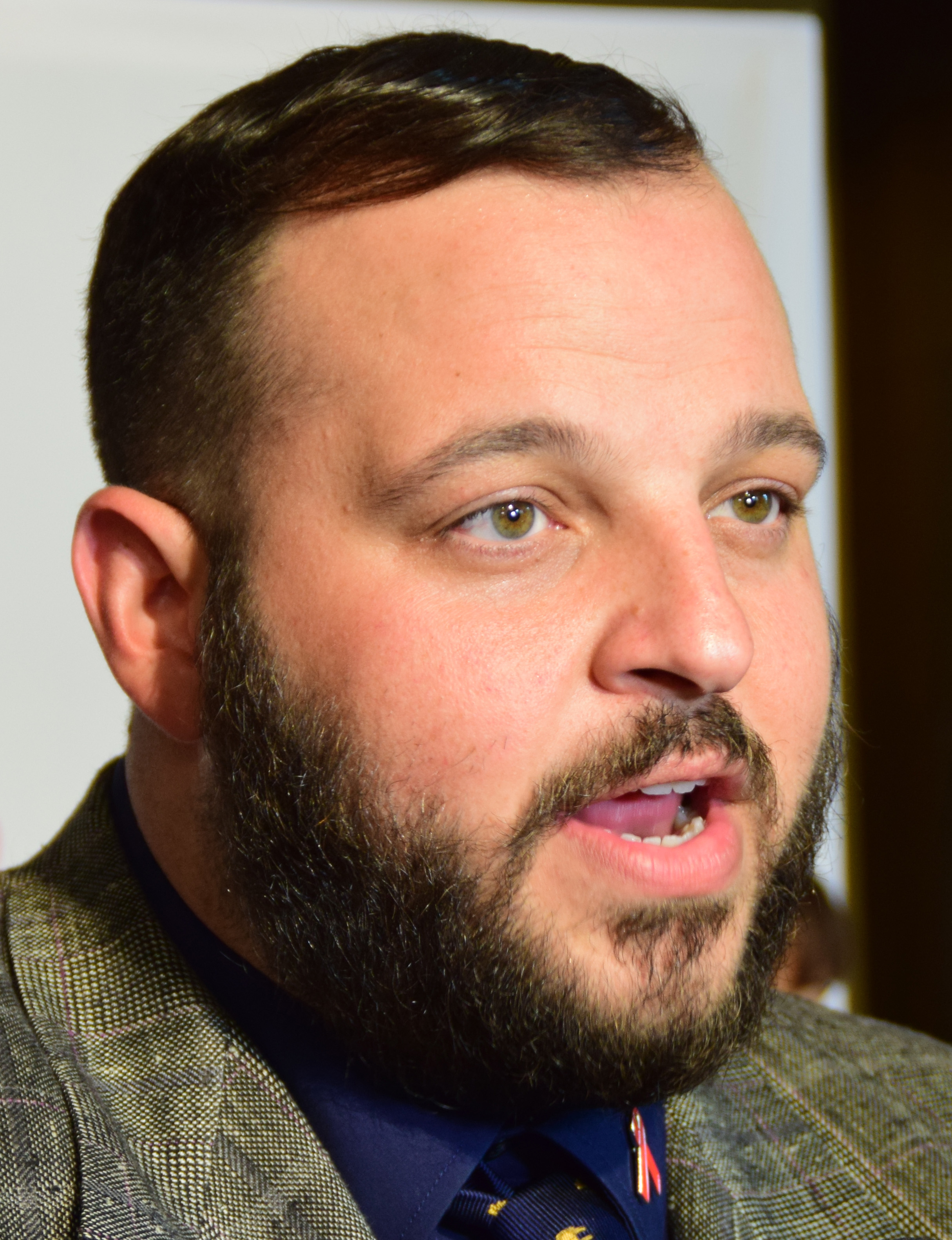
Daniel Franzese played Damian in the original 2004 film.

In the original 2004 film, Damian is played by American actor Daniel Franzese. He sings "Beautiful" (2002) by Christina Aguilera during the talent show. After someone in the audience throws a shoe at him, Damian throws it back. He wears a blue hoodie and black sunglasses as an "incognito" look. In Business Insider's 2022 list of the "most iconic" outfits from the film, Arielle Tschinkel said the look is "not the most fashionable" but "still iconic". Billie Walker of Digital Spy said Damian's "catty one liners can still be recited by millennials everywhere", but "still failed in its queer representation".

According to Franzese, he was asked to reprise the role for the music video to Ariana Grande's "Thank U, Next" (2018), but he was unable to participate because of a schedule conflict.

=== Musical ===
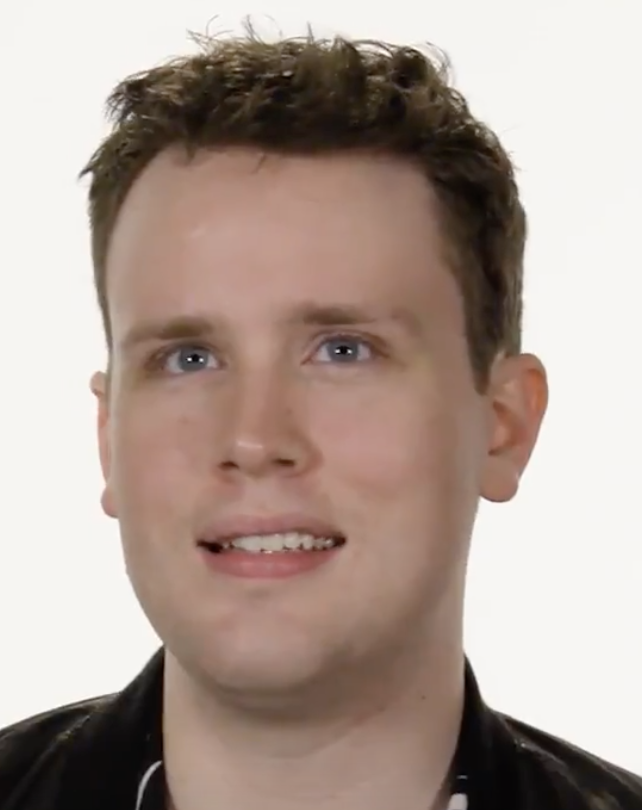
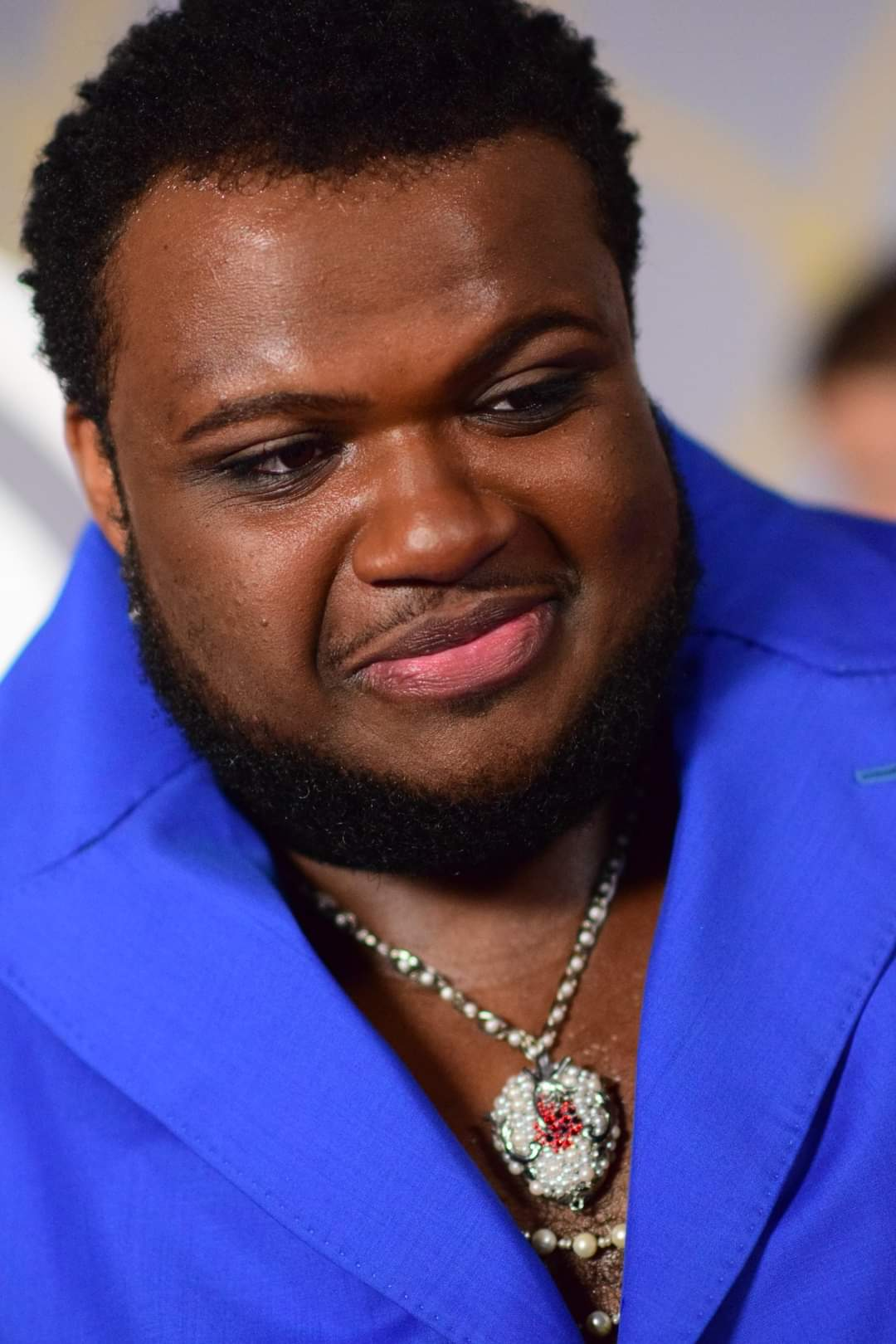
Grey Henson (left) and Jaquel Spivey (right) played Damian in the musical and its 2024 film adaptation, respectively.

Unlike the original film, Damian brings a male partner to the dance in the musical and 2024 film adaptation.

On stage, Damian has been played by Grey Henson on Broadway, Eric Huffman, and Ethan Jih-Cook. Henson was nominated for the Tony Award for Best Featured Actor in a Musical for his performance.

==== 2024 film adaptation ====
In a review of the 2024 film, in which Damian is portrayed by Jaquel Spivey, André Hereford of Metro Weekly said Damian and Janis "are the ringmasters, narrating the entire story" of the production. In 2024, Caitlin Tyrrell of Screen Rant said Auliʻi Cravalho's portrayal of Janis "brings a new layer to the friendship between Janis and Damian as two LGBTQ+ kids who may have bonded in part because of their sexuality".

== See also ==
- Gay characters in fiction
- List of fictional gay characters
