= Barrett Wilbert Weed =

American actress (born 1988)

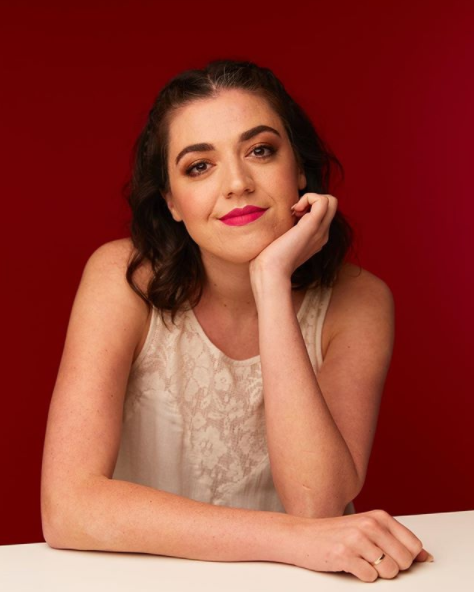
- Weed in 2018
- Born: November 6, 1988 (age 38); Boston, Massachusetts, U.S.
- Education: Elon University (BFA)
- Occupations: Actress, singer
- Years active: 2011–present
- Notable work: Heathers: The Musical; Mean Girls; Helluva Boss

Barrett Wilbert Weed (born November 6, 1988) is an American actress and singer. She is best known for originating the roles of Veronica Sawyer in the Off-Broadway production of Heathers: The Musical and Janis Sarkisian in the Broadway production of Mean Girls. She also voices Octavia "Via" Goetia in Helluva Boss.

== Early life and education ==
Weed grew up in Cambridge, Massachusetts. At age five, she began performing with the Boston Children's Opera. Her father died from cancer when she was seven years old. Growing up, she attended Long Lake Camp for the Arts in Long Lake, New York.

She attended the Walnut Hill School for most of high school after transferring from a private preparatory school. In an interview, Weed said of the school, "It's an amazing place — like Hogwarts. Walnut Hill saved my life." She credits the staff and standards of Walnut Hill for much of her later success.

She graduated from Elon University with a BFA in musical theatre in 2011.

On April 13, 2019, Weed was awarded a 2019 Top 10 Under 10 Alumni Award from Elon University, an award given annually which "recognizes 10 alumni who have graduated between 2018 and 2019 and who have achieved major professional success, serve as difference-makers in their communities and loyally support Elon."

Weed is the niece of actress Kathi Moss, who originated the role of Saraghina in 1982 Broadway production of Nine and also appeared in original Broadway productions of Grease and Grand Hotel.

== Career ==
Weed made her Broadway debut in Lysistrata Jones in November 2011, as an understudy for many of the female roles. The show closed on January 8, 2012.

Her next major role was Nadia in a reworked version of Bare: A Pop Opera, now called Bare: The Musical, at New World Stages. Previews began on November 19, 2012, with an official opening on December 9, 2012, and the show ran through February 3, 2013.

She then played Zoe Murphy in Dear Evan Hansen for the May Reading in 2014.

Weed then originated the leading role of Veronica in Heathers: The Musical, a musical adaptation of the 1988 cult film Heathers. The musical premiered at Hudson Backstage Theatre in Los Angeles in the fall of 2013, before moving to New York for its Off-Broadway incarnation. The show began previews at New World Stages on March 15, 2014, with an opening night of March 31. She was nominated for a Lucille Lortel Award and a Drama Desk Award for her performance. Weed left the show in June, and the show closed on August 4, 2014.

In September 2014, Weed began performing in FOUND The Musical, a new Off-Broadway musical about the creation of the Found books and magazines by Davy Rothbart. Weed played the role of Denise. The show opened on October 14 and ran through November 9, 2014.

Weed played the role of Sally Bowles in the Signature Theatre production of Cabaret from May 12 to June 28, 2015, in the Washington, D.C. area. For this performance, she won the Helen Hayes Award for Outstanding Lead Actress in a Musical.

Weed narrates "Kill The Boy Band" by Goldy Moldavsky on Audible.com and Audio CD's, which was audio released on March 1, 2016.

Weed starred in the new musical Mean Girls as Janis Sarkisian on Broadway. She was part of the world premiere which started on October 31, 2017, and ended December 3, 2017, at the National Theatre. The musical, based on the film of the same name began previews on Broadway on March 12, 2018, and officially opened April 8, 2018. Weed has stated she identifies strongly with the 'outspoken cynicism' of her character. Co-star Grey Henson and Weed worked together to receive their roles in the production. Her final performance in the role was March 8, 2020.

When she is not acting, Weed enjoys teaching voice and acting lessons to teenagers, as well as teaching master classes at high schools.

Since 2020, she has voiced Octavia "Via" Goetia in the adult animated web series Helluva Boss.

On December 2, 2020, it was announced that Weed joined the cast of Bridge and Tunnel, a TV show on Epix. She plays Lizzie, "the artsy, sarcastic older sister of Pags (Brian Muller), who dreams of rock stardom for her all-girl punk band, Wildfire". The show aired on January 24, 2021.

== Artistry ==
Weed is typically classified as a mezzo-soprano, and is widely known for her high belting.

== Personal life ==
Weed is an advocate for a number of causes, including female empowerment, gun control, and voting rights.

== Filmography ==
=== Television ===
Year	Title	Role	Notes	Ref.
2018	Saturday Night Live	Herself (uncredited)	Episode: "Tina Fey"	
2018	The Tonight Show Starring Jimmy Fallon	Herself	Episode: "Tina Fey/Evan Rachel Wood/Mean Girls"	
2019	Crashing	Deborah	Episode: "MC, Middle, Headliner"	
2020	Blue Bloods	Lauren Wilson	Episode: "Hide in Plain Sight"	
2021	Bridge and Tunnel	Lizzie	Recurring role, four episodes	

=== Web series ===
Year	Title	Role	Notes	Ref.
2020–present	Helluva Boss	Octavia "Via" Goetia	Voice role	
2021	Swipe Monster	Courtney Whitlock	Mini series	

== Theatre credits ==
Year(s)	Production	Role	Location	Category
2011–2012	Lysistrata Jones	Female u/s	Walter Kerr Theatre	Broadway
2012–2013	Bare: The Musical	Nadia	New World Stages	Off-Broadway
2013	Heathers: The Musical	Veronica Sawyer	Hudson Theatre Backstage	Regional
2014	Heathers: The Musical	Veronica Sawyer	New World Stages	Off-Broadway
2014	FOUND The Musical	Denise	Atlantic Theatre Company	Off-Broadway
2014	Dear Evan Hansen	Zoe Murphy		May 2014 Reading
2014	Waitress	Dawn Louise Pinkett	American Repertory Theater	December 2014 Workshop
2015	Cabaret	Sally Bowles	Signature Theatre	Regional
2017	Mean Girls	Janis Sarkisian	National Theatre	Out-of-town tryout
2018–2020	Mean Girls	Janis Sarkisian	August Wilson Theatre	Broadway

== Awards and nominations ==
Year	Award	Category	Nominated Work	Result
2014	Drama Desk Award	Outstanding Actress in a Musical	Heathers: The Musical	Nominated
2014	Lucille Lortel Awards	Outstanding Lead Actress in a Musical	Heathers: The Musical	Nominated
2016	Helen Hayes Awards	Outstanding Lead Actress in a Musical	Cabaret	Won
2018	Broadway.com Audience Awards	Favorite Featured Actress in a Musical	Mean Girls	Won
2018	Broadway.com Audience Awards	Favorite Funny Performance	Mean Girls	Won
2018	Broadway.com Audience Awards	Favorite Onstage Pair (with Grey Henson)	Mean Girls	Won
