= Regina George =

Fictional character from Mean Girls

- Mean Girls character
- Rachel McAdams as Regina George in Mean Girls (2004)
- First appearance: Mean Girls (2004)
- Created by: Tina Fey
- Portrayed by: Rachel McAdams; Others: see list

In-universe information
- Occupation: Student at North Shore High; Lacrosse player
- Affiliation: The Plastics (formerly)
- Family: June George (mother); Kylie George (sister)
- Significant other: Aaron Samuels (ex-boyfriend)
- Education: North Shore High School

Regina George is the main antagonist of the 2004 film Mean Girls. She is portrayed by Rachel McAdams in the film, Taylor Louderman in its Broadway musical version, and Reneé Rapp as the Broadway replacement and in the 2024 film adaptation of the musical. A queen bee, Regina is a bully and leader of a social clique called The Plastics at the fictional North Shore High School. Regina garnered positive reviews of her character upon release. In subsequent years, Regina has been described as a cultural icon. She has frequently appeared in popular meme templates online and is often referenced in political commentary, particularly in reference to American politician Donald Trump.

== Fictional character biography ==
=== 2004 film ===
In Mean Girls (2004), Regina George lives with her mother June, who is shallow and self-absorbed, and wants to be a "cool mom". Her father is only seen once in the film; she also has a younger sister, Kylie. She attends a fictional North Shore High School. In the beginning of the movie, Regina is seen being carried by five boys on a field by protagonist Cady Heron, who has just moved from Africa. Cady is warned of Regina and told to avoid her by social outcasts Damian Leigh and Janis Ian, who describe her "fabulousness" as an "unattainable goal". Regina is seen to be the subject of obsession by her classmates, with them idolizing her while regarding her with love, fear, loathing, and admiration at the same time.

Soon after, Regina invites Cady to sit with her clique, the Plastics, at lunch. After an invitation to become part of the clique, Janis convinces Cady to pretend to be friends with Regina in order to get revenge after Regina socially ostracized Janis. It is later revealed that the pair were friends until 8th grade, when Regina spread a rumor that Janis was a lesbian. Regina invites Cady to her lavish house with the Plastics, where she shows her a "burn book", a journal the Plastics use to insult students and faculty at their school. After Regina learns Cady has a crush on her ex-boyfriend Aaron Samuels, she kisses him in front of Cady at a Halloween party, upsetting her. Regina and Aaron rekindle their relationship.

Cady, Damian, and Janis decide to destroy Regina's "resources" for popularity by breaking Aaron and her up, tricking her into eating weight-gain protein bars, and turning the Plastics against each other. Regina is dethroned from queen bee status, with Cady taking her place. After finding out what Cady has done, Regina copies and distributes pages of her burn book around the school, framing Cady and former Plastic members Gretchen Wieners and Karen Smith as the authors of the book. The contents of the book spark fights around the school, leading to all junior girls being brought to the gymnasium by a teacher, Ms Norbury. When Regina refuses to apologize, Janis openly admits her plot to sabotage the former's social status. Regina furiously leaves the school, with Cady following her, attempting to apologize. After Regina insults Cady by calling the latter a "less-hot version" of her, a school bus hits her and breaks her spine.

After Cady wins Queen of the Spring Fling dance, she apologizes for her actions and distributes pieces of her plastic tiara to members of the crowd, including Regina, who takes up lacrosse to channel her anger and learns to change her behaviour. The film ends with the Plastics breaking up and going their separate ways.

=== 2024 film ===
Mean Girls (2024) follows the same plot as the 2004 version, with minor revisions. In the film, it is mentioned that Regina once kissed Janis Ian while playing spin the bottle in middle school. After Janis came out as a lesbian, Regina spread rumors that she was obsessively in love with her. Instead of making physical copies of the pages in the burn book, Regina leaves the book itself in the hallway.

== Creation and characterization ==
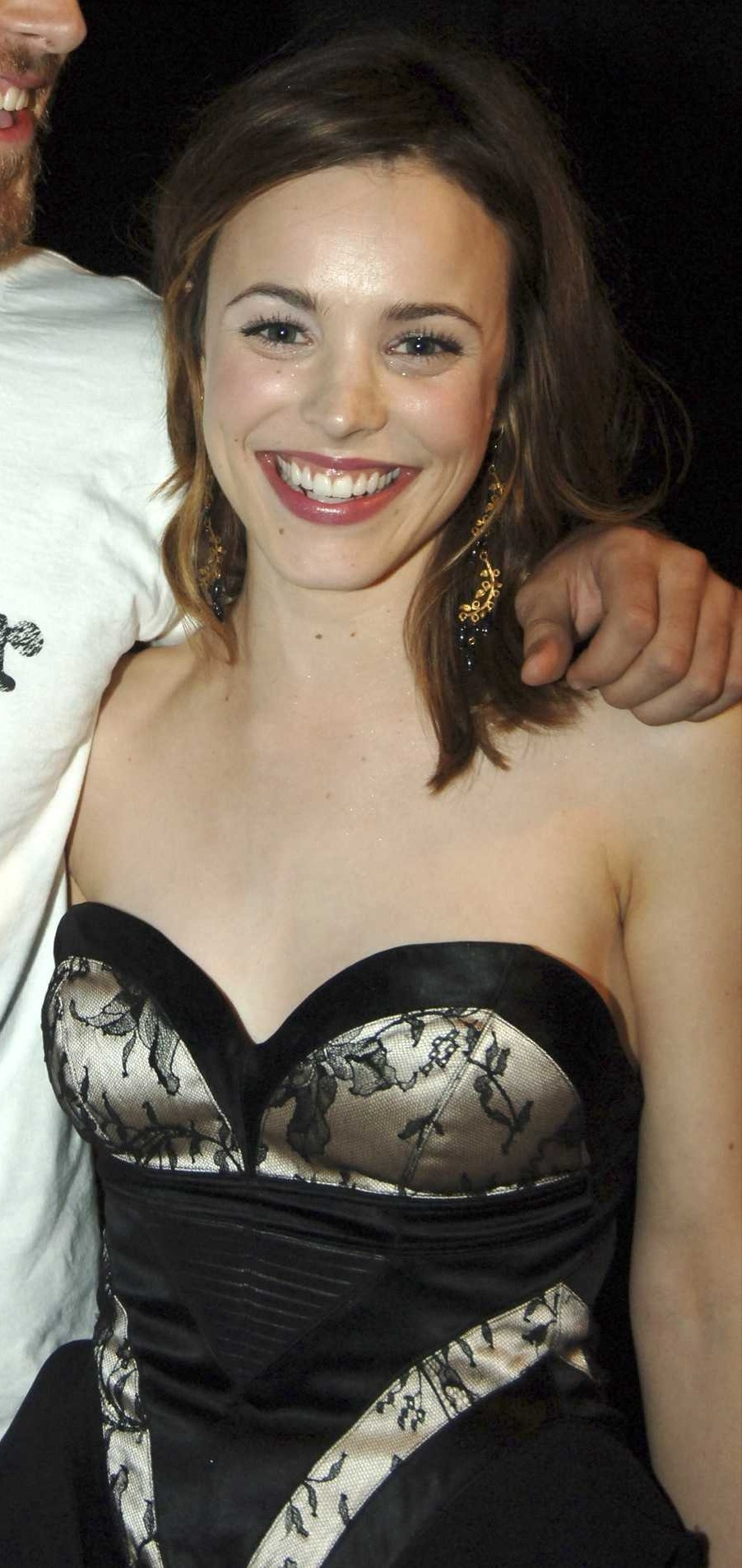
Rachel McAdams portrayed Regina George in the original 2004 film.

Regina's name is of Latin origin, meaning "the queen". Director Mark Waters was impressed with Rachel McAdams's audition for the role of Regina, noting that she seemed to intimidate co-star Lindsay Lohan and "dominated" the room. The decision for Regina came between McAdams and actress Amanda Seyfried; however, McAdams was eventually chosen for the role. Seyfried was later cast as Karen in the film. To prepare for the role of Regina, who McAdams described as "a really angry kid who had no boundaries or guidance", McAdams listened to music by singer Courtney Love and watched Alec Baldwin's character in Glengarry Glen Ross. As the leader of the Plastics, Regina has been described as a manipulative and beautiful queen bee who enforces strict rules for other members to follow, including a dress code.

== Portrayals ==
In the original 2004 film, Regina is portrayed by Rachel McAdams. In 2018, Ariana Grande portrayed the character in her music video for "Thank U, Next".

Year	Actress	Format	Distributor	Ref.
2004	Rachel McAdams	Film	Paramount Pictures	
2017	Taylor Louderman	Musical	Broadway (National Theatre)	
2018	Taylor Louderman	Musical	Broadway (August Wilson Theatre)	
2019	Reneé Rapp	Musical	Broadway (August Wilson Theatre)	
2019	Mariah Rose Faith	Musical	U.S. National Tour	
2023	Maya Petropoulos	Musical	U.S. National Tour	
2024	Reneé Rapp	Film	Paramount Pictures	
2024	Georgina Castle	Musical	West End	

== Reception and legacy ==
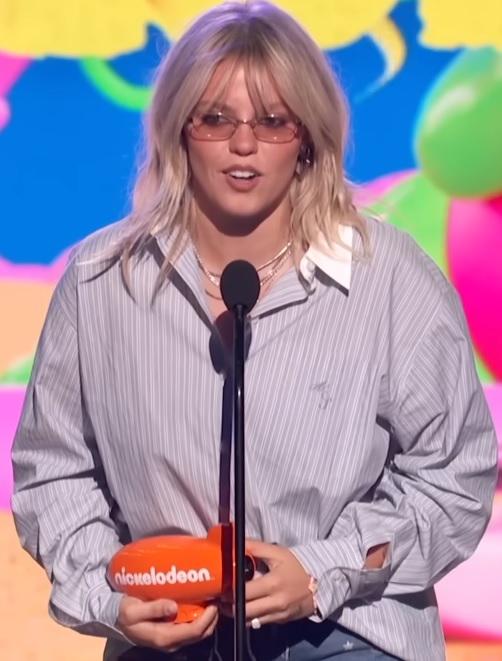
Reneé Rapp, who portrayed Regina in Mean Girls (2024), believes the character is lesbian.

As a prominent figure in popular culture, Regina is regarded as a cultural icon and a queen bee. (Note: Attributed to several sources, including (Bentley 2019, pp. 145), (Dymond & Murguía 2022, p. 248), (Kanai 2017, pp. 11), (McMillan 2017, p. 89), (Meyer, Waldron & Stern 2014, p. 13), and (Robinson-Cseke 2009, p. 40)) Justin Chang for the Los Angeles Times praised Regina in the 2004 film, writing that Regina's lack of self-knowledge made her vicious and funny. Mike Clark for USA Today called Regina "funniest of the Plastics", and praised McAdams' comic flair. Mick LaSalle for SFGate praised McAdams' performance, noting that she brought "glamour and magnetism" to Regina, and comedic relief when necessary. In 2019, a Sky Q poll voted Regina the "meanest high school film character of all time". Regina made the list for CNN's favourite movie villains. Her character is a common internet meme.

Professor Maria Robinson-Cseke found that Regina and Cady's conflict began due to their vastly different backgrounds, since Regina was rich, glamorous, and mean, whilst Cady was middle-class, plain, and kind. Robinson-Cseke also asserted that Regina's characterization was unlike traditional villain tropes, as whilst she is beautiful, Regina becomes a metaphorical monster. At the Halloween party, Cady dresses as a monster, making guests physically recoil and keep distance, symbolizing her transformation into Regina. In the Popular Culture Studies Journal, Michaela Meyer, Linda Waldron and Danielle Stern argued that Mean Girls (2004) showed immense significance in its depiction of race, where light skin is the ideal symbol of status and power. They asserted that Regina regulated the standard of beauty and popularity, promoting a "possessive investment" in whiteness. Reneé Rapp, who played Regina in the 2024 version of the film, stated that she believes the character is lesbian, mirroring her own sexuality. In addition, she believes that Regina used the men she dated as pawns.

Regina was mentioned by singer Katy Perry in a cryptic tweet against fellow singer Taylor Swift during their feud. Perry tweeted "Watch out for the Regina George in sheep's clothing" following Swift talking about falling out with an unnamed celebrity with Rolling Stone.

Since 2016, Regina has been discussed extensively in topics relating to Politics of the United States, with politician and media personality Donald Trump often being compared to her character. During the 2016 United States presidential election, Democratic candidate Hillary Clinton compared Republican candidate Trump to Regina in an advertisement campaign. On the day of the 2016 election, #ReginaGeorge trended on Twitter following satirical support for her as President of the United States. In 2018, the Israeli Embassy in Washington responded to the supreme leader of Iran Ali Khamenei on Twitter with a gif depicting Regina saying "why are you so obsessed with me?". The tweet quickly gained popularity, being retweeted over 25,000 times and being liked over 80,000 times. In 2019, Clinton responded to Trump on Twitter with the same clip. American businessman and politician Mike Bloomberg featured Regina in an advertisement against Trump, in a clip where she says "God, Karen, you are so stupid!".
