= Angourie Rice =

Australian actress (born 2001)

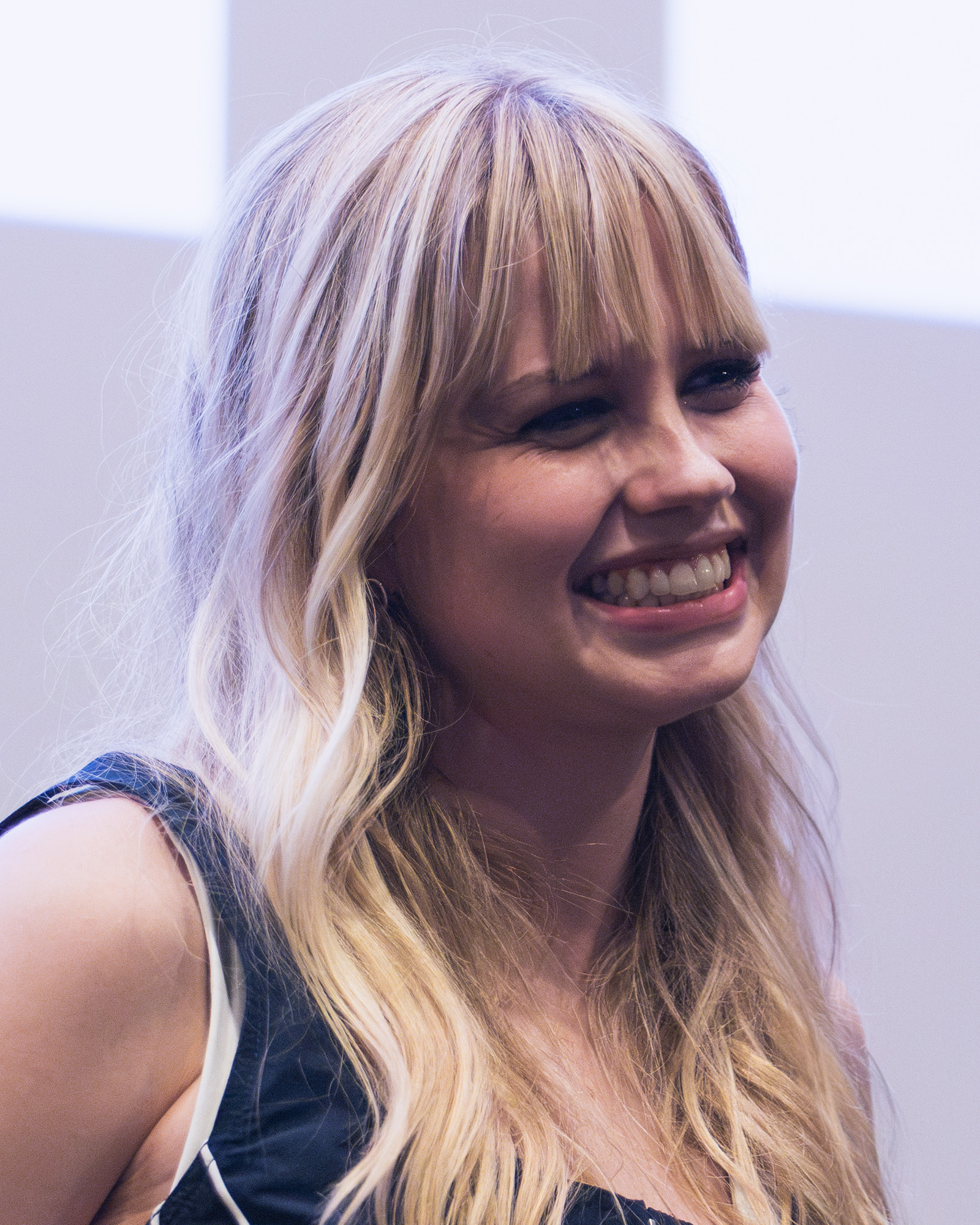
- Rice in 2026
- Born: 1 January 2001 (age 25); Sydney, Australia
- Occupation: Actress
- Years active: 2013–present

Angourie Rice (/æŋˈɡaʊri/ ang-GOW-ree; born 1 January 2001) is an Australian actress. She began her career as a child actress, coming to attention for her roles in These Final Hours (2013) and The Nice Guys (2016). She played Betty Brant in the Marvel Cinematic Universe, appearing in Spider-Man: Homecoming (2017), Spider-Man: Far From Home (2019), and Spider-Man: No Way Home (2021). For her starring role in Ladies in Black (2018), she won the AACTA Award for Best Actress in a Leading Role. In 2024, she starred as Cady Heron in the musical film Mean Girls and Emily Raine in Finding Emily (2026)

Rice's television credits include the Black Mirror episode "Rachel, Jack and Ashley Too" (2019), the HBO miniseries Mare of Easttown (2021), and the Apple TV series The Last Thing He Told Me (2023).

She has also co-written two novels with her mother, author Kate Rice, titled Stuck Up & Stupid (2023) and My Wonderful Disgrace (2026). The former is being adapted as a Stan Original TV series, with Rice as lead actress.

== Early life and education ==
Angourie Rice was born on 1 January 2001 in Sydney, New South Wales. She was named after the town of Angourie, New South Wales, where her grandmother lived. Her parents are Jeremy Rice, a director, and Kate Rice, a writer. She lived in Perth for five years and in Munich, Germany, for one year before moving to Melbourne.

She attended Princes Hill Secondary College, graduating in 2018, but did not attend university due to growing success as an actress.

== Career ==
Rice began her career in Perth, Western Australia, with several short films and Australian television credits. In 2012, Rice gained industry attention at just eleven years old with her lead role in Zak Hilditch's short Transmission, for which she won the Best Actress award at the St Kilda Short Film Festival.

In 2013, Rice made her feature film acting debut with apocalyptic thriller film These Final Hours. She also appeared in the live action sequences at the beginning and end of the animated film Walking with Dinosaurs. In 2014, Rice appeared in the television series The Doctor Blake Mysteries, Worst Year of My Life Again, and appeared in Mako: Island of Secrets in 2015.

In 2016, Rice had her break-out performance as Holly March in the action comedy The Nice Guys opposite Ryan Gosling and Russell Crowe. She also appeared in the science-fiction fantasy film Nowhere Boys: The Book of Shadows as Tegan, a supernatural villain. In 2017, she played Eliza Wishart in the Australian film adaptation of the novel Jasper Jones which garnered several AACTA nominations. She also played Jane in The Beguiled.

Rice played Betty Brant in the 2017 film Spider-Man: Homecoming. She reprised the part, this time in a more significant role, in the 2019 sequel Spider-Man: Far From Home. She reprised the role again in the web series The Daily Bugle, and yet again in Spider-Man: No Way Home.

In 2018, Rice headlined the romantic drama Every Day, and as Lisa in the Australian film adaptation of Ladies in Black for which she won an AACTA award for Best Lead Actress. In 2019, Rice starred opposite Miley Cyrus in the season 5 finale of Black Mirror, an episode described as a "save-the-day buddy romp" and "a teen sci-fi adventure". In 2021, Rice was listed in Variety magazine's coveted 'Actors to Watch' list, as well as their 'Power of Young Hollywood' list. She played the role of Siobhan in Mare of Easttown opposite Kate Winslet. She noted that the Delco accent (Delaware County, Pennsylvania) was hard to master and worked hard to tone down her Australian English.

Inspired by her book club activities, she began running the podcast The Community Library, with the aim of democratising critical reading skills, in 2019.

In April 2022, Rice was cast to star alongside Jennifer Garner in the Apple TV+ miniseries The Last Thing He Told Me. In December 2022, Rice was cast as Cady Heron in the film-adaptation of the Broadway musical Mean Girls, based on the 2004 hit film alongside Auli’i Cravalho, Reneé Rapp, and Jaquel Spivey, which was released in theatres on 12 January 2024.

In May 2026, Rice appeared in the co-lead role of Emily Raine in British rom-com Finding Emily.

She co-wrote Stuck Up & Stupid with her mother, Kate Rice. The book was shortlisted for the 2024 Young Adult Indie Book Award. The novel is a witty reworking of Jane Austen's Pride and Prejudice, set in Australia. In May 2026, Angourie and her mother published another co-written book, titled My Wonderful Disgrace. Australian streaming service Stan have adapted Stuck-Up & Stupid for television, casting Rice as the lead actress, with filming under way in Sydney in September 2026.

== Filmography ==
=== Film ===
Key
†	Denotes films that have not yet been released

Year	Title	Role	Notes
2013	These Final Hours	Rose	
2013	Walking with Dinosaurs	Jade	
2016	Nowhere Boys: The Book of Shadows	Tegan	
2016	The Nice Guys	Holly March	
2017	Jasper Jones	Eliza Wishart	
2017	The Beguiled	Jane	
2017	Spider-Man: Homecoming	Betty Brant	
2018	Every Day	Rhiannon	
2018	Ladies in Black	Lisa	
2019	Spider-Man: Far From Home	Betty Brant	
2020	Daisy Quokka: World's Scariest Animal	Daisy Quokka (voice)	Animated film
2021	Spider-Man: No Way Home	Betty Brant	
2022	Senior Year	Young Stephanie Conway	
2022	Honor Society	Honor Rose	
2024	Mean Girls	Cady Heron	
2025	Steal Away	Fanny	
2026	Finding Emily	Emily Raine	
TBA	Nice Eggs †	Cori Mulligan	Post-production

=== Television ===
Year	Title	Role	Notes
2014	The Doctor Blake Mysteries	Lisa Wooton	Episode: "The Silence"
2014	Worst Year of My Life Again	Ruby	Episode: "Halloween"
2015	Mako: Island of Secrets	Neppy	Episode: "Stowaway"
2019	Black Mirror	Rachel Goggins	Episode: "Rachel, Jack and Ashley Too"
2019–2026	Have You Been Paying Attention?	Self	Guest Quizmaster (4 episodes)
2021	Mare of Easttown	Siobhan Sheehan	Miniseries
2023–present	The Last Thing He Told Me	Kirstin/Bailey Michaels	Main role
TBA	Stuck-Up & Stupid	Lily Bennet	Main role

=== Web ===
Year	Title	Role	Notes
2021	The Daily Bugle	Betty Brant	Main role (season 2)

== Accolades ==
Awards	Year	Category	Work	Result	Ref.
AACTA Awards	2018	Best Actress	Ladies in Black	Won	
Empire Awards	2017	Best Female Newcomer	The Nice Guys	Nominated	
International Online Cinema Awards (Halfway Award)	2019	Best Ensemble Performance	The Beguiled	Won	
