= Georgina Castle =

English actress

- Castle in 2025.
- Born: Georgina Emily Castle; 11 December 1992 (age 33)
- Other name: Georgie Castle
- Education: Central School of Speech and Drama
- Years active: 2012–present
- Spouse: Simon Lipkin (m. 2025)
- Children: 1
- Father: Andrew Castle

Georgina Emily Castle (born 11 December 1992) is an English actress. She is known for her work in musical theatre. In the West End, her roles include Sophie in Mamma Mia! at the Novello Theatre and Regina George in Mean Girls at the Savoy Theatre.

== Early life and education ==
Castle was born in the South London Borough of Sutton and grew up in Clapham, the daughter of broadcaster and former tennis player Andrew Castle and Sophia (née Runham). Her maternal grandparents are Swedish. She is a descendant of Annie Besant through her paternal grandmother.

In addition to playing sport with her sister Claudia, Castle took weekend Stagecoach drama classes as well as singing and ballet lessons. Castle attended Alleyn's School, where she completed A Levels in English literature, religious studies, and psychology. She went on to graduate from the Central School of Speech and Drama in 2014 with a Bachelor of Arts (BA) in Acting.

== Career ==
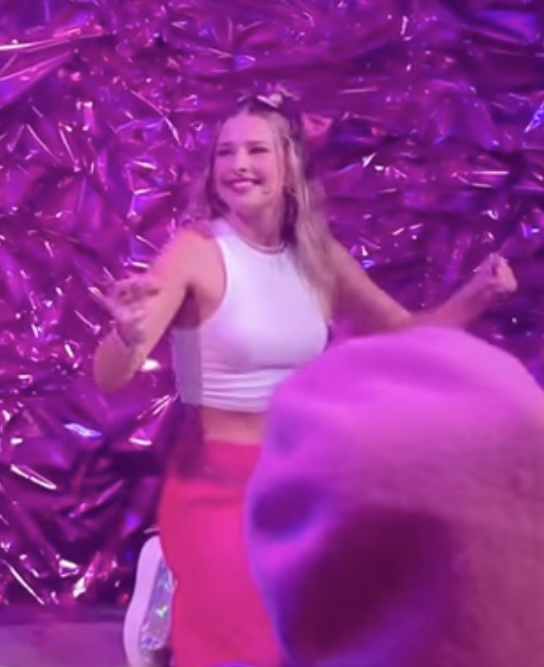
Castle performing in Millennials in 2022.

In 2009 at age 16, Castle performed on Keith Jack's tour. She guest starred in a 2012 episode of the BBC One police procedural New Tricks. This was followed by an appearance in a 2014 episode of the medical soap opera Doctors.

After graduating from drama school, Castle played Lisa Houseman on the 2015 UK tour of Dirty Dancing. Castle made her West End debut in 2017 when she joined the cast of Mamma Mia! at the Novello Theatre as the lead character Sophie. This was followed by roles in Twist and Shout at the Other Palace in 2018 and as Doralee Rhodes on the 2019 UK tour of 9 to 5 with Amber Davies.

Castle appeared in Andrew Lloyd Webber's Cinderella for its short-lived 2021 run at the Gillian Lynne Theatre. She returned to the Other Palace in 2022 for Millennials.

Also in 2022, Castle starred as Jovie opposite Simon Lipkin in the West End revival of Elf at the Dominion Theatre. Castle then reprised her role as Lisa Houseman in Dirty Dancing the following year, also at the Dominion.

In 2024, Castle starred as Regina George in the West End premiere of Mean Girls, a musical adaptation of the film of the same title. The show closed in June 2025.

== Personal life ==
In 2025, Castle married fellow actor Simon Lipkin, who also appeared in Elf. The couple have a daughter (born 2026).

== Filmography ==
Year	Title	Role	Notes
2012	New Tricks	Alice Kemp	Episode: "Love Means Nothing in Tennis"
2014	Doctors	Lisa Harrison	Episode: "Fear and Loathing"

== Stage ==
Year	Title	Role	Notes
2015	Dirty Dancing	Lisa Houseman	UK tour
2017	Mamma Mia!	Sophie	Novello Theatre, London
2018	Twist and Turn	Charlotte Skelton	The Other Palace, London
2019	9 to 5	Doralee Rhodes	UK tour
2021	Cinderella	Marie	The Other Palace / Gillian Lynne Theatre, London
2022	Millennials		The Other Palace, London
2022	Elf	Jovie	Dominion Theatre, London
2023	Dirty Dancing	Lisa Houseman	Dominion Theatre, London
2023	Elf	Jovie	Dominion Theatre, London
2024-2025	Mean Girls	Regina George	Savoy Theatre, London
2025	50 First Dates: The Musical	Lucy	The Other Palace, London

== Awards and nominations ==
Year	Award	Category	Work	Result	Ref.
2025	WhatsOnStage Awards	Best Performer in a Musical	Mean Girls	Nominated	
