= Talia Suskauer =

American stage actress

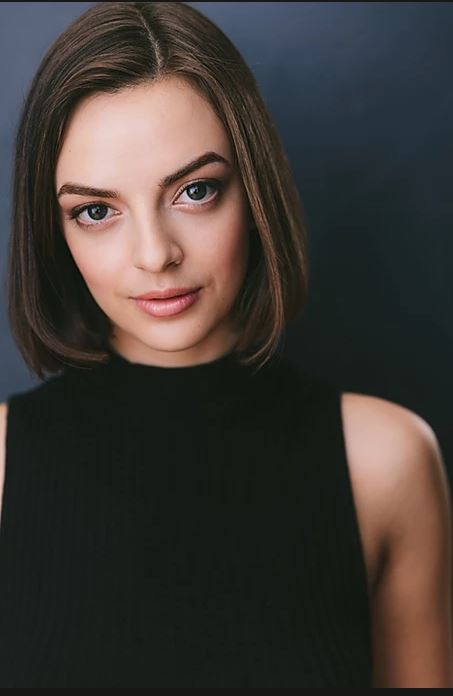
- Talia Suskauer
- Born: August 2, 1996 (age 30); Palm Beach Gardens, Florida, United States
- Education: Penn State University (BFA)
- Occupation: Actress
- Years active: 2000–present
- Known for: Broadway productions of Wicked and Be More Chill
- Parent(s): Michelle Suskauer; Scott Suskauer
- Relatives: Becca Suskauer (sister)

Talia Suskauer (born August 2, 1996) is an American musical theatre actress, who is best known for playing Elphaba in the Broadway company of the smash-hit musical Wicked.

== Early life ==
Suskauer was born in Palm Beach Gardens, Florida. Her mother, Michelle Suskauer was a criminal defense lawyer who would later become president of the Florida Bar Association; her father Scott Suskauer was also an attorney who would later become a judge on Florida's 15th Judicial Circuit. By age 4, she had begun acting in local roles at her community temple. As a child, her parents would take her to attend Broadway shows in New York and played cast albums for her; as a result Suskauer claims that theater "was the only thing I ever really wanted to do". She attended Bak Middle School of the Arts and Dreyfoos School of the Arts, majoring in theatre, and performed on stage locally at StarStruck Theatre in Stuart. She attended Penn State University as part of the musical theater BFA program, graduating in 2018. During her freshman year, she was selected to be a 2015 YoungArts winner in Theatre Arts.

== Broadway performances: Be More Chill and Wicked ==
In 2018, a year after graduating college, Suskauer made her off-Broadway debut at the Signature Theatre in New York City as the female standby and assistant dance captain in Be More Chill. The performance was then transferred to the Lyceum Theatre on Broadway in February 2019. Suskauer stayed with the production until its closing in August 2019.

Suskauer auditioned for the role of Elphaba in Wicked in August 2019, shortly after completing her tenure in Be More Chill. She was selected after receiving a final callback just one week after her first audition and joined the national tour in Las Vegas as Elphaba on September 24, 2019, replacing Mariand Torres. She performed as Elphaba until March 12, 2020, when the tour temporarily shut down due to the COVID-19 pandemic. She reopened the show in Dallas at the Music Hall at Fair Park on August 3, 2021, in the first Broadway touring performance to take place since the COVID shutdown began. She played her final performance on tour on March 20, 2022 and was replaced by Lissa deGuzman.

It was then announced that Suskauer would be transferring to the Broadway production, replacing Lindsay Pearce as Elphaba on May 24, 2022. She played her final performance on March 5, 2023, and was replaced by her standby, Alyssa Fox. A TikTok of Suskauer's longtime vocal coach Craig Wich's reaction to the news that she would be joining the cast went viral. She returned to Wicked for one day only on March 27, 2024 to provide emergency cover for Elphaba and later returned to the production on January 27, 2026 as a temporary standby for Elphaba, standing by for Lencia Kebede and Keri René Fuller before leaving the company on March 15, 2026.

Suskauer's performances as Elphaba have been received favorably by critics. KDHX's Tina Farmer said "Talia Suskauer shines as Elphaba, with beautiful diction and a rich voice that resonates with relatable insecurity and determination." BroadwayWorld's Daniel Collins said of Suskauer, "Elphaba may have a magical broom but she's also got a powerful set of pipes, nearly shaking the rafters as Suskauer belts out songs like 'Defying Gravity' and 'No Good Deed,' each ending with a powerful, how-long-can-she-sustain-that-note vocal crescendo."

== Other performances ==
Suskauer has performed regionally at the New London Barn Playhouse in New London, New Hampshire, repeatedly earning New Hampshire Theatre Award nominations for roles such as Princess Fiona in Shrek the Musical, Rosa Bud in The Mystery of Edwin Drood, Lily Craven in The Secret Garden, and Jo March in Little Women. She has also performed at the Penn State Centre Stage with roles as Ms. Asp in Love In Hate Nation and Daphna in Bad Jews. From January 21 to September 7, 2025, she played the role of Lucille Frank in the national tour of the Tony Award-winning revival of the 1998 musical Parade. From June to August 2026, Suskauer led A Walk on the Moon, an off-Broadway musical based on the film of the same name running at the Laura Pels Theatre.

Suskauer is represented by the Harden Curtis Kirsten Riley talent agency and Moxie Artists management.
