= Cady Heron =

Mean Girls character

- Mean Girls character
- Lindsay Lohan as Cady Heron in Mean Girls (2004)
- First appearance: Mean Girls (2004)
- Created by: Tina Fey
- Portrayed by: Lindsay Lohan (2004 film); Jessie Wright (2004 film; child); Erika Henningsen (stage musical); Sabrina Carpenter (stage musical); Angourie Rice (2024 film)

In-universe information
- Nicknames: Caddy; Home-schooled jungle freak Africa
- Gender: Female
- Occupation: Student at North Shore High (formerly); North Shore guidance counselor
- Affiliation: The Plastics (formerly); North Shore Mathletes (formerly)
- Family: Chip (father); Betsy (mother)
- Significant other: Aaron Samuels
- Nationality: American
- Education: Homeschooled; North Shore High
- Residence: Kenya, Africa (exact location unknown); Evanston, Illinois, United States

Cady Heron (/keɪdi hɛrən/ KAY-dee HERR-ən) is a fictional character and the protagonist of the 2004 film Mean Girls and its musical counterpart. She is portrayed by Lindsay Lohan in the original film, Erika Henningsen in its Broadway musical version and by Angourie Rice in its 2024 musical film.

== Biography ==
Cady is the only child of Chip and Betsy Heron. Her family moved to Africa when Cady was young as her parents got jobs there as research zoologists. Cady grew up home-schooled by her mother, but she was somewhat popular and had lots of friends in Africa. Not much is known about her time there, but she enjoyed living there, loved getting to spend time with animals and had a crush on a boy named Nfume, who did not like her back. Cady often references how the animals in Africa would handle high-school issues.

== Personality ==
When she is introduced, Cady is a naive fish out of water, who has little knowledge of social norms in high school and is unfamiliar with much of pop culture; however, she is depicted as very sweet and kind despite her naivety. She is a strong mathematician, being rather smart and somewhat nerdy. However, over the course of the film her personality changes, as she is influenced by The Plastics. She becomes more shallow and vain and drastically changes her fashion choices. She abandons her love for math and declines an invitation to join the mathletes to become more like the other Plastics. She remains to have a good heart but is heavily influenced by peer pressure throughout the story and longs to fit in, which leads her to become spiteful and plot revenge against Regina George. However, she is shown to regret this revenge later on and eventually chooses to abolish the cliques at her school and ends the film returning to her original kind and sweet personality, though she is slightly less naive.

== Concept and creation ==
Cady was created by Tina Fey for the purposes of the movie. Fey got the name for the character from a college roommate.

Lindsay Lohan was advised to audition for the role of Cady after auditioning for the character of Regina George, gaining the role. Inversely, Rachel McAdams, who went on to play Regina, initially auditioned for the role of Cady, but was deemed too old.

== Role in Mean Girls ==
After her mother accepts a job at Northwestern University, Cady moves to North Shore High, a public high school in Evanston, Illinois. During her first day of school, she was shunned by her peers and ends up eating alone in the bathroom stall because she had not made any friends. The next day, two students named Damian Leigh and Janis Ian befriend her and try to educate her on how to navigate high school, including warning her about a group of rich popular girls dubbed "The Plastics", Karen Smith, Gretchen Wieners, and especially their leader and the school's queen bee, Regina George. Later that day during lunch, Cady is called to The Plastics' table by Regina. The Plastics decide to adopt Cady into their group. When told about this, Janis wants to use the friendship to get revenge on Regina, with Cady not understanding as she initially sees Regina as sweet.

One day at Regina's house, Cady is shown "The Burn Book", a book which has insults about all the other students in the school written inside. Cady develops a crush on a boy in her math class named Aaron Samuels, but is told by Karen Smith and Gretchen Wieners the next day that she can't like him as he is Regina's ex-boyfriend. While Gretchen promises not to tell Regina, she nevertheless does, but Regina convinces Cady that she isn't mad, promising to put in a good word for Cady. Cady begins acting dumb in her math class because she thinks she'll get Aaron's attention. At a Halloween party, Aaron is approached by Regina, who kisses him in front of Cady, taking him back. After this, Cady grows angry and eventually plots revenge. Cady replaces Regina's facial cream with foot cream, reveals to Aaron that Regina is cheating on him so he will break up with her, tricks Regina into eating high calorie nutrition bars, Kälteen Bars, which make her rapidly gain weight, and drives a wedge between Regina and Gretchen and Karen by revealing what Regina had said about them. All of this tanks Regina's reputation and Cady becomes the queen bee of Northshore High.

Cady throws a party at her house, without inviting Damien or Janis, which gets out of control as she accidentally vomits on Aaron after revealing to him that she had lied about her intelligence. After Aaron storms out, Damien and Janis arrive and the latter chastises Cady for her personality change and for becoming a bad person before leaving. Later that night, Regina creates an entry in the Burn Book criticising herself with the goal being to frame Cady for it. The next day at school Cady is seen by the principal about the Burn Book, but while this happens a riot breaks out as the girls all see their entries and begin accusing each other of badmouthing them. The girls are shortly after taken to the gym for a team-building exercise, led by Miss Norbury, where they have to apologize to each other for all the hurtful things said. Regina storms out due to being humiliated, and Cady follows her, only for her to be hit by an oncoming bus.

Cady decides to take the fall for the Burn Book, refusing to say who else wrote it and being grounded. She also joins the mathletes to gain extra credit. On the day of the mathlete finals, North Shore and their rival school are locked in a tie, with Cady being selected as the tiebreaker against Caroline Krafft, a girl from the other school. Cady beats Caroline in the tiebreaker and wins the mathlete tournament for North Shore. She then attends the Spring Fling dance later that night, and surprisingly wins Spring Fling queen. She gives a speech apologizing and building bridges, breaking her crown and throwing the pieces to other girls at the dance.

Cady finishes the school year dating Aaron, and being friends with Damien, Karen, Janis, Kevin, and Jessica, North Shore now having less cliques dividing the student body.

== Mean Girls (2018 musical) ==
The character was revived for the Broadway counterpart of the film where she is introduced in the musical number "It Roars". Her role in the musical is similar to that of the original movie.

Cady is featured in a total of twelve songs: "It Roars", "Where Do You Belong?", "Meet the Plastics", "Stupid with Love", "Apex Predator", "Revenge Party", "Fearless", "Whose House Is This?", "More Is Better", "Someone Gets Hurt (Reprise)", "Do This Thing", and "I See Stars".

== Other appearances ==
- In 2018, Elizabeth Gillies portrayed the character in Ariana Grande's music video for "Thank U, Next" as an homage to the 2004 film.
- In 2023, Lohan reprised the character in a Walmart commercial with Heron working as a guidance counselor at North Shore High.
- In 2024, Lohan makes a cameo appearance in the 2024 musical film adaptation as the unnamed mathletes moderator but acknowledges the existence of her original character.

== Reception ==
Lohan earned two MTV Movie Awards and three Teen Choice Awards for her performance, as well as a nomination for Best Young Performer at the Critics' Choice Awards among other accolades. She has been regarded as one of the most memorable movie narrators of all time. Benjamin Dzialdowski wrote for BuzzFeed that "Mean Girls is one of THE most quotable films, and Cady's voiceover sets everything up as we join her for the wild ride that is high school." October 3 has been dubbed "Mean Girls Day" on social media due to a popular line in the film said by the character. Aya Tsintziras of Screen Rant said in 2020 that "Mean Girls is one of Lindsay Lohan's most popular films and Cady Heron is one of her most compelling characters." In March 2021, Richard Brody of The New Yorker ranked Lohan's performance in the film as the eleventh best of the 21st century up to that point, praising her "blend of charisma and awkwardness, innocence and guile" as well as "faux-casual earnestness" she used for dialogue. The character has been featured in several Mean Girls-related merchandise and collectibles made in her likeness, including Funko Pop figures and Bratz dolls.
