= Jonalyn Saxer =

American theatre actress

Jonalyn Saxer is an American theatre actress. She is best known for her roles in Mean Girls and for performing in ensemble and swing roles in multiple Broadway productions.

== Early life ==
Saxer grew up in Agoura Hills, a suburb of Los Angeles, California, and attended Oak Park High School. Saxer comes from a family of musicians and performers known for local performances.

She graduated from Syracuse University in 2014.

== Career ==
In 2013, Saxer earned her Actors Equity card performing in 42nd Street at the Pittsburgh Civic Light Opera.

Saxer made her Broadway debut in 2014 as a swing in Bullets Over Broadway. She also opened Broadway productions as an ensemble member in Honeymoon in Vegas and Holiday Inn.

In 2016, Saxer covered five different roles, or "tracks," in Cats.

In 2018, Saxer joined the cast of Mean Girls. She was with the cast during its Washington, DC previews and was in the original Broadway cast as a member of the ensemble. Saxer understudied the roles of Regina George, Karen Smith, and Cady Heron. Saxer starred as Karen Smith in the North American national tour.

In 2021, Saxer performed as a Jet girl in West Side Story directed by Steven Spielberg.

In 2023, Saxer joined the original Broadway cast of Back to the Future. In keeping with a longtime Broadway opening tradition, Saxer donned the Legacy Robe.

Saxer participated in a workshop of Smash in 2024.

== Personal life ==
Saxer is close friends with Ashley Park, with whom she performed in Mean Girls; during the COVID-19 pandemic, Park lived with Saxer's family for a period of time.

== Stage credits ==
Year	Title	Role	Venue	Ref.
2013	42nd Street	Ensemble	Regional, Pittsburgh Civic Light Opera	
2014	Bullets Over Broadway	Ensemble (replacement)	Broadway, St. James Theatre	
2014	Honeymoon in Vegas	Swing	Broadway, Nederlander Theatre	
2015	Moonshine: The Hee Haw Musical	April	Regional, Dallas Theater Center	
2016	Cats	Swing (replacement)	Broadway, Neil Simon Theatre	
2016	Holiday Inn: The New Irving Berlin Musical	Ensemble	Broadway, Studio 54	
2017	Mean Girls	Ensemble	Regional, National Theatre	
2018	Mean Girls	Ensemble	Broadway, August Wilson Theatre	
2021	Mean Girls	Karen Smith	U.S. National Tour	
2023	Back to the Future	Ensemble	Broadway, Winter Garden Theatre	
2024	Death Becomes Her	Ensemble (replacement)	Broadway, Lunt-Fontanne Theatre	
