= Rick Younger =

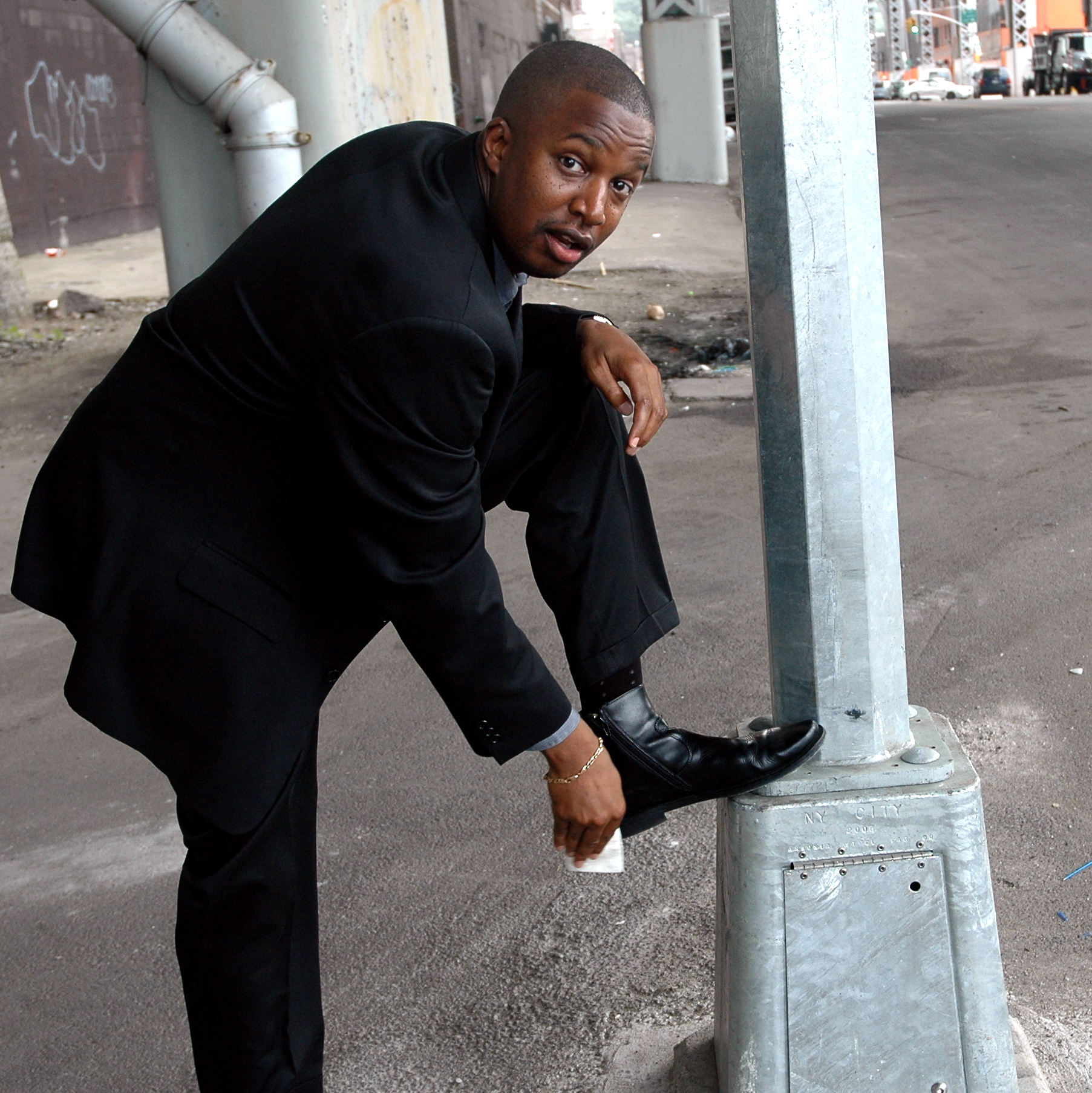
Rick Younger

Rick Younger is a performer from Baltimore, Maryland.

== Biography ==
Younger got his start in stand-up comedy in the Washington, D.C., area in 1992 while still in college at the University of Maryland. Since starting in the world of stand-up comedy, Younger has performed with many of the top names in comedy and has made television appearances on BET's ComicView and Teen Summit, FOX's 30 Seconds to Fame, Showtime at the Apollo, and NBC's Last Comic Standing. Younger was nominated for the 2008 MAC Award for Stand-Up Comic and won the 2009 MAC Award for Male Stand-Up Comedy.

Younger's work in stand-up comedy led to an acting career in theatre, commercials, television, and film. He has guest-starred on Law & Order: Criminal Intent, Law & Order: Special Victims Unit, Damages, Blue Bloods, and Girls, among other series. Younger has also appeared in spots for brands including Starburst, Verizon, Staples, and McDonald's.

Younger's theatre credits include performing in the 2001-2002 national tour of Rent and originating the role of Mr. Duvall in Mean Girls on Broadway, in which he performed from the production's opening in March 2018 to its closing in March 2020.

He is a regular correspondent on the "Guys Tell All" monthly segment of NBC's The Today Show. In 2010, he appeared in the film Morning Glory, featuring Harrison Ford, Rachel McAdams, Diane Keaton, and Jeff Goldblum. In 2009, the documentary Souled Out Comedy, which Younger produced, won the Audience Award at the inaugural New York Friars' Club Film Festival.
