= Mean Girls (musical) =

Musical by Jeff Richmond, Nell Benjamin and Tina Fey

- Original Broadway poster
- Music: Jeff Richmond
- Lyrics: Nell Benjamin
- Book: Tina Fey
- Basis: Mean Girls by Tina Fey; Queen Bees and Wannabes by Rosalind Wiseman
- Premiere: October 31, 2017: National Theatre, Washington, D.C.
- Productions: 2017 Washington, D.C.; 2018 Broadway; 2019 U.S. tour; 2023 U.S. tour; 2024 West End; 2026 UK tour
- Awards: Drama Desk Award for Outstanding Book of a Musical

Mean Girls is a rock musical with a book by Tina Fey, lyrics by Nell Benjamin, and music by Jeff Richmond. It is based on the 2004 film by Mark Waters, which was also written by Fey and was in turn inspired by Rosalind Wiseman's 2002 book Queen Bees and Wannabes. The musical focuses on Cady Heron, a teenage girl who transfers to a public high school after being homeschooled her whole life in Africa. At school, she befriends outsiders Janis Sarkisian and Damian Hubbard who persuade her to infiltrate the "Plastics", a clique consisting of wealthy but insecure Gretchen Wieners, sweet but dimwitted Karen Smith, and "queen bee" Regina George.

Directed and choreographed by Casey Nicholaw, and produced by Lorne Michaels, the original production of Mean Girls premiered on Broadway at the August Wilson Theatre in 2018, after completing pre-Broadway tryouts in Washington, D.C. at the National Theatre in 2017. The show received positive to mixed reviews from critics and was nominated for twelve awards at the 72nd Tony Awards, including Best Musical. A recording featuring the original Broadway cast was released in 2018 by Atlantic Records. The show closed after 833 performances on Broadway on March 11, 2020, due to the COVID-19 pandemic.

A film adaptation was released in theaters in January 2024.

== Background ==
A musical adaptation of the 2004 film Mean Girls was in the works by 2013. News emerged on October 3, 2016—dubbed "Mean Girls Day" by fans, referencing a line in the movie "On October 3rd he asked me what day it was"—that the musical would have its world premiere in Washington, D.C., in the fall of 2017. On December 30, 2016, producers confirmed that the musical would make its premiere at the National Theatre in October 2017.

== Synopsis ==
=== Act one ===
Janis Sarkisian and Damian Hubbard introduce the audience to Cady Heron, breaking the fourth wall ("A Cautionary Tale"). Cady and her parents have moved to a Chicago suburb from Kenya, but Cady soon realizes that her high school classmates do not readily accept others who differ from them. She accepts the challenge of fitting in at the high school ("It Roars"), only to find that no one seems to like her or even acknowledge her ("It Roars" (reprise)). Janis and Damian decide to help her find her social group ("Where Do You Belong?"), describing the school's clique of social royalty dubbed "the Plastics". The clique consists of Regina George, the "Queen Bee"; Gretchen Wieners, Regina's eager-to-please second-in-command; and Karen Smith, a stereotypical dumb blonde. The Plastics invite Cady to eat lunch with them for the rest of the week ("Meet the Plastics"). Janis urges Cady to accept and report back.

In calculus class, Cady falls for dreamy Aaron Samuels ("Stupid with Love"). Kevin, head of the Mathletes, is impressed with Cady's performance in class and asks her to join the team, but Gretchen warns Cady that joining the Mathletes is social suicide; Regina makes Kevin leave. Cady thinks Regina is protecting her, but Janis warns her that Regina is dangerous. Amazed and intoxicated by her newfound power, Cady ignores Janis's words ("Apex Predator"). Cady tells Gretchen and Karen about her feelings for Aaron; horrified, they declare him "off limits", as he is Regina's ex-boyfriend. At Regina's house, Cady meets Regina's "cool mom" and the Plastics show Cady their old Burn Book, where they write mean comments under classmates' photos. Under Janis' photo are homophobic comments. Regina says that she and Janis and were best friends until they argued in middle school. Regina claims Janis freaked out at not being invited to Regina's thirteenth birthday party and ended up in art therapy. Later, Gretchen tells Cady that her friendship with Regina has left her deeply insecure ("What's Wrong with Me?").

The next day, Aaron tells Cady that his relationship with Regina made him feel unlike himself; he has sworn off dating. Cady pretends to need help with math to get closer to Aaron ("Stupid with Love" (reprise)). Aaron invites Cady to his Halloween party. Karen mentions that Halloween in high school is all about looking sexy ("Sexy"), but Cady fails to understand and is embarrassed to arrive at the party in a "scary" costume. At the party, Gretchen tells Regina about Cady's crush on Aaron. Regina flirts with Aaron to spite Cady ("Someone Gets Hurt"). Cady is devastated when Aaron kisses Regina.

Furious, Cady tells Damian and Janis what happened. Damian reveals that Regina's and Janis's friendship ended in 6th grade when Regina accused Janis of being a lesbian. Janis did not deny it, and classmates bullied her until she left school. The three get revenge on Regina by giving her high calorie protein bars to make her gain weight. They also trick Gretchen by sending a fake gift to Cady from "Regina" saying that the two are now best friends. Gretchen then reveals Regina cheated on Aaron with a football player; Cady tells Aaron ("Revenge Party"). After the Plastics' disastrous dance at the school's talent show, people start noticing Regina's weight gain. Later, when she breaks one of the Plastics' arbitrary clothing rules, Cady stands up to her, banning her from sitting at their table; everyone is relieved to be freed from Regina's rule ("Fearless").

=== Act two ===
After the winter break, Cady is the new "Queen Bee", leading Karen and Gretchen ("A Cautionary Tale" (reprise)), though Damian and Janis disapprove of this. Cady says that she cannot attend Janis's art show. Damian and other girls in school try to forestall Cady's growing social obsessions ("Stop"). Gretchen and Karen persuade Cady to throw a party while her parents are away. Gretchen starts to feel that Cady treats her like Regina did. Meanwhile, Mrs. George wonders why her daughter refuses to confide in her. Concurrently, Gretchen contemplates being friends with Cady ("What's Wrong With Me?" (reprise)).

During the party, Cady wants Aaron to come over; she gets drunk and crazier ("Whose House is This?"). When Aaron arrives, they sneak off to her bedroom; Cady tells him that she played dumb make him like her. Aaron says he liked the smart and kind Cady, not her new Plastic self ("More is Better"). He leaves and she chases after him but runs into Janis and Damian. They tell Cady that she has gone full Plastic. Cady accuses Janis of being in love with her, just as Regina did years ago. Janis and Damian, disgusted, throw a picture at Cady, revealing that she won the art show with a painting of the three of them ("Someone Gets Hurt" (reprise)).

Regina discovers that she was not invited to Cady's party and that the protein bars caused her weight gain. After adding "Regina is a Fugly Cow" to ithe Burn Book to hide the blame, Regina distributes copies of it around the school, revealing insults about everyone except Karen, Gretchen, and Cady ("World Burn"). All of the girls begin fighting. Janis and Damian see an insult in the book that only Cady could have written about him. At a school assembly about the Burn Book, Ms. Norbury tries to bring the girls together. Janis tells the school why her friendships ended with both Cady and Regina, empowering the girls to stand up for themselves ("I'd Rather Be Me"). When Regina storms out, Cady tries to apologize, but Regina, distracted, gets hit by a passing school bus and injured.

Cady realizes what a monster she has become. Learning Ms. Norbury was about to be fired due to things she wrote, Cady takes full blame for the Burn Book, protecting Gretchen and Karen. She is suspended for three weeks and banned from Spring Fling ("Fearless" (reprise)). When she returns to school, Ms. Norbury offers her a way to save her grade: joining the Mathletes at the state championships. The team wins, and Cady feels redeemed ("Do This Thing"). She then sneaks into the Spring Fling with Aaron's help after kissing him. There, she and Regina make up.

Cady is elected Spring Fling Queen, but she breaks the plastic crown into several pieces and gives one to each girl in attendance – telling them they are all "real, and rare". She apologizes to Janis and Damian, and they become friends again. All the girls join together, accepting each other ("I See Stars").

== Musical numbers ==
Act 1

- "A Cautionary Tale" – Janis, Damian
- "It Roars" – Cady, Ensemble
- "It Roars" (reprise)^{†} – Cady, Ensemble
- "Where Do You Belong?" – Damian, Janis, Cady, Ensemble
- "Meet the Plastics" – Regina, Gretchen, Karen, Janis, Damian, Cady
- "Stupid with Love" – Cady
- "Apex Predator" – Janis, Cady
- "What’s Wrong with Me?" – Gretchen
- "Stupid with Love" (reprise) – Aaron, Cady
- "Sexy" – Karen, Female Ensemble
- "Someone Gets Hurt" – Regina, Aaron, Male Ensemble
- "Revenge Party" – Janis, Damian, Cady, Company
- "Fearless"* – Cady, Gretchen, Karen, Ensemble

Act 2

- "A Cautionary Tale" (reprise)^{†} – Janis, Damian
- "Stop"* – Damian, Art Students, Karen, Ensemble
- "What's Wrong with Me?" (reprise) – Gretchen, Mrs. George
- "Whose House Is This?" – Kevin G, Cady, Gretchen, Karen, Ensemble
- "More Is Better" – Cady, Aaron, Ensemble
- "Someone Gets Hurt" (reprise) – Cady, Janis, Damian
- "World Burn" – Regina, Ensemble
- "I'd Rather Be Me" – Janis, Ensemble
- "Fearless" (reprise)^{†*} – Cady
- "Do This Thing"* – Cady, Ms. Norbury, Kevin G, Mathletes
- "I See Stars" – Cady, Company

In the 2024 West End production, the lyrics to several songs were rewritten. The song "I'm Blowing Up" replaces "Stop!" as the opening number of Act 2. "Do This Thing" is replaced by a reprise of "Stupid with Love". An extended version of "Revenge Party" replaces "Fearless".

== Productions ==
=== Broadway (2018–2020) ===
The musical made its world premiere at the National Theatre in Washington, D.C., on October 31, 2017, and ran through December 3, 2017. Mean Girls began previews on Broadway at the August Wilson Theatre on March 12, 2018, before opening officially on April 8, 2018. Casey Nicholaw was the director of the show and its choreographer, and the musical is produced by Lorne Michaels and Stuart Thompson. Costumes were by Gregg Barnes, scenic design by Scott Pask, video design by Finn Ross and Adam Young, lighting by Kenneth Posner and sound by Brian Ronan. By January 2020, the production had recouped its capitalization. When the COVID-19 pandemic forced Broadway theatres to close, the show halted performances on March 11, 2020 and later announced that it had closed after 833 performances.

=== U.S. national tour (2019–2023) ===
The first U.S. national tour began in Buffalo, New York, at Shea's Performing Arts Center, on September 21, 2019, with Mary Kate Morrissey as Janis Sarkisian, Danielle Wade as Cady Heron, Mariah Rose Faith as Regina George, Megan Masako Haley as Gretchen Wieners, Jonalyn Saxer as Karen Smith, Eric Huffman as Damian Hubbard, Adante Carter as Aaron Samuels, and Kabir Bery as Kevin Gnapoor. The national tour concluded in Fort Lauderdale, Florida on May 7, 2023 at the Broward Center for the Performing Arts.

=== U.S. national tour (2023–2025) ===
A non-equity North American tour began on September 26, 2023, at the Landmark Theatre in Syracuse, New York. Directed by Casey Hushion and choreographed by John MacInnis, the cast was led by Natalie Shaw as Cady, Maya Petropoulos as Regina George, Kristen Amanda Smith as Gretchen, MaryRose Brendel as Karen, Alexys Morera as Janis, Ethan Jih-Cook as Damian, Joseph Torres as Aaron and Shawn Mathews as Kevin. It closed on June 1, 2025, at the Avenir Centre in Moncton, New Brunswick.

=== West End (2024–2025) ===
After a planned 2021 West End production was cancelled due to the COVID-19 pandemic, a production began previews at the Savoy Theatre on June 5, 2024, with an opening night on June 26. The cast includes Charlie Burn as Cady, Georgina Castle as Regina, Elèna Gyasi as Gretchen, Grace Mouat as Karen, Elena Skye as Janis, Tom Xander as Damian, Daniel Bravo as Aaron, Lucca Chadwick-Patel as Kevin, Ako Mitchell as Mr Duvall, and Zoë Rainey as Ms Norbury, Mrs George and Ms Heron. The show won Best New Musical at the WhatsOnStage Awards, and Tom Xander received a nomination for the Laurence Olivier Award for Best Actor in a Supporting Role in a Musical. The show closed on June 8, 2025.

=== Brazil (2025) ===
The first Brazilian production of Mean Girls played at Teatro Santander in São Paulo from March to June 2025. Directed by Mariano Detry, the songs were translated into Portuguese. The cast included Laura Castro as Cady, Anna Akisue as Regina, Aline Serra as Karen, Gigi Debei as Gretchen and Danielle Winits as Ms Norbury, Mrs George and Ms Heron.

=== UK tour (2026) ===
The West End production is touring the UK and Ireland beginning at the Manchester Opera House on 23 February 2026, with performances expected through at least January 2027. The tour stars Vivian Panka as Regina, Emily Lane as Cady, Sophie Pourret as Karen, Georgie Buckland as Janis, Max Gill as Damian, Karim Zeroual as Kevin, Joshua Elmore as Mr Duvall, Faye Tozer as Ms Heron/Ms Norbury/Mrs George, and Kiara Dario as Gretchen.

== Cast and characters ==
Character	Washington, D.C.	Broadway	US National tour	US National tour	West End	UK Tour
Character	2017	2018	2019	2023	2024	2026
Cady Heron	Erika Henningsen	Erika Henningsen	Danielle Wade	Natalie Shaw	Charlie Burn	Emily Lane
Regina George	Taylor Louderman	Taylor Louderman	Mariah Rose Faith Casillas	Maya Petropoulos	Georgina Castle	Vivian Panka
Janis Sarkisian	Barrett Wilbert Weed	Barrett Wilbert Weed	Mary Kate Morrissey	Alexys Morera	Elena Skye	Georgie Buckland
Damian Hubbard	Grey Henson	Grey Henson	Eric Huffman	Ethan Jih-Cook	Tom Xander	Max Gill
Gretchen Wieners	Ashley Park	Ashley Park	Megan Masako Haley	Kristen Amanda Smith	Elèna Gyasi	Kiara Dario
Karen Smith	Kate Rockwell	Kate Rockwell	Jonalyn Saxer	Mary Rose Brendel	Grace Mouat	Sophie Pourret
Aaron Samuels	Kyle Selig	Kyle Selig	Adante Carter	Joseph Torres	Daniel Bravo	Ben Oatley
Kevin Gnapoor	Cheech Manohar	Cheech Manohar	Kabir Bery	Shawn Mathews	Lucca Chadwick-Patel	Karim Zeroual
Mrs. Heron/Ms. Norbury/Mrs. George	Kerry Butler	Kerry Butler	Gaelen Gilliland	Kristen Seggio	Zoë Rainey	Faye Tozer
Mr. Duvall	Rick Younger	Rick Younger	Lawrence E. Street	Justin Phillips	Ako Mitchell	Joshua Elmore

=== Notable cast replacements ===
==== Broadway (2018–2020) ====
- Cady Heron: Sabrina Carpenter
- Regina George: Reneé Rapp
- Gretchen Wieners: Krystina Alabado
- Aaron Samuels: Cameron Dallas
- Mrs. Heron/Ms. Norbury/Mrs. George: Jennifer Simard, Catherine Brunell

==== U.S. national tour (2019–2023) ====
- Janis Sarkisian: Lindsay Pearce
- Gretchen Wieners: Jasmine Amy Rogers

== Recording ==
The Original Broadway Cast recording was released digitally in the U.S. on May 18, 2018. The physical album was released in the U.S. on June 15, 2018. The album debuted at number 42 on the Billboard 200 chart, the highest debut for a cast album in over a year.

On December 7, 2018, a full version of "Rockin' Around the Pole", a song that does not appear on the cast recording and was cut from the musical but still used as a short snippet during the talent show scene, was released on digital music platforms. A music video for the holiday song was also released. On April 8, 2020, a live recording of "Bossed Up", a song that was included in the show's Washington, D.C., tryout but was ultimately cut from the Broadway production, was officially released to celebrate what would have been the show's second anniversary on Broadway.

== Critical response ==
Marilyn Stasio, in her review for Variety, wrote: "Fey has front-loaded the show with great gags. ... Benjamin's lyrics aren't half as clever as Fey's off-the-cuff wisecracks, but they get the job done and are quirky enough to make you listen hard for the good stuff, providing enough payoff lyrics to reward your attention. ... Fans of the original movie should be reassured that nothing important has been purged from the story." David Rooney of The Hollywood Reporter commented: "If the songs composed by Fey's husband Jeff Richmond with lyrics by Nell Benjamin more often fall into workmanlike pastiche than inspired musical storytelling, too seldom developing robust melodic hooks, the score at least wins points for democratization. Every one of the principals gets a musical moment that tells us who they are. ... While the show's book outshines the score, the songs pack in their share of wit, both in Benjamin's nimble lyrics ... and Richmond's buoyant tunes".

Sara Holdren, for Vulture, wrote: "The first act is so strong, with such a well-built, fast-paced arc, that the second half feels like it takes a few tugs on the starter cord before the lawnmower fires up again. Some of the movie's best jokes don't fully land in their delivery. ... It's not shocking that Mean Girls is a fast-paced fancy fun time, but it's a real treat to find that it's still witty, worldly, and wise." Entertainment Weekly's Kristen Baldwin gave the musical a B+, calling the musical "An ode to self-respect and the benefits of a STEM-based education, Broadway's Mean Girls is a lively, frequently hilarious adaptation of Tina Fey's 2004 high school comedy. Propelled by dazzling set design and several stand-out performances, the musical ... gives fans everything they want while bringing the saga of Regina George and the Plastics into the social media age."

The New York Times's Ben Brantley wrote: "The trouble lies in the less assured translation of Ms. Fey's sly take on adolescent social angst into crowd-pleasing song and dance. Mr. Richmond and Ms. Benjamin's many (many) musical numbers are passable by middle-of-the-road Broadway standards, yet they rarely capture either the tone or the time of being a certain age in a certain era ... the show weighs in at two and a half hours, as opposed to the movie's zippy 97 minutes." Nevertheless, he enjoyed parts of the musical, calling the mean girls in the show "next-door versions of those cosmetically perfect pop and movie stars whose public vanities and follies we savor with such glee. Ms. Fey is an ace student of this universal prurience. She's also smart enough to let us wallow in and renounce it at the same time."

== Adaptations ==
A film adaptation of the musical was released in theaters on January 12, 2024, by Paramount Pictures. Arturo Perez and Samantha Jayne directed the film, with Tina Fey returning to write the screenplay. Jeff Richmond and lyricist Nell Benjamin also returned to rework their songs from the musical. It features Angourie Rice as Cady, Auliʻi Cravalho as Janis, Christopher Briney as Aaron, Jaquel Spivey as Damian, Bebe Wood as Gretchen, and Avantika Vandanapu as Karen. Reneé Rapp, a Broadway replacement as Regina George, reprises the role, while Fey and Tim Meadows reprise their roles from the 2004 film. Ashley Park, who originated the role of Gretchen in the musical, makes a cameo in the film as Cady's French teacher.

Music Theatre International (MTI) licenses "high school" and "junior" versions of the show.

== Awards and nominations ==
=== Original Washington, D.C., production (2017) ===
Year	Award Ceremony	Category	Nominee	Result
2018	Helen Hayes Awards	Outstanding Visiting Production		Won
2018	Helen Hayes Awards	Outstanding Performer – Visiting Production	Grey Henson	Nominated
2018	Helen Hayes Awards	Outstanding Performer – Visiting Production	Kate Rockwell	Nominated

=== Original Broadway production (2018) ===
Year	Award Ceremony	Category	Nominee	Result
2018	Tony Awards	Best Musical		Nominated
2018	Tony Awards	Best Actress in a Leading Role in a Musical	Taylor Louderman	Nominated
2018	Tony Awards	Best Actor in a Featured Role in a Musical	Grey Henson	Nominated
2018	Tony Awards	Best Actress in a Featured Role in a Musical	Ashley Park	Nominated
2018	Tony Awards	Best Book of a Musical	Tina Fey	Nominated
2018	Tony Awards	Best Original Score	Jeff Richmond and Nell Benjamin	Nominated
2018	Tony Awards	Best Scenic Design of a Musical	Scott Pask, Finn Ross & Adam Young	Nominated
2018	Tony Awards	Best Costume Design of a Musical	Gregg Barnes	Nominated
2018	Tony Awards	Best Sound Design of a Musical	Brian Ronan	Nominated
2018	Tony Awards	Best Direction of a Musical	Casey Nicholaw	Nominated
2018	Tony Awards	Best Choreography	Casey Nicholaw	Nominated
2018	Tony Awards	Best Orchestrations	John Clancy	Nominated
2018	Drama Desk Awards	Outstanding Musical		Nominated
2018	Drama Desk Awards	Outstanding Featured Actor in a Musical	Grey Henson	Nominated
2018	Drama Desk Awards	Outstanding Featured Actress in a Musical	Ashley Park	Nominated
2018	Drama Desk Awards	Outstanding Featured Actress in a Musical	Kate Rockwell	Nominated
2018	Drama Desk Awards	Outstanding Choreography	Casey Nicholaw	Nominated
2018	Drama Desk Awards	Outstanding Lyrics	Nell Benjamin	Nominated
2018	Drama Desk Awards	Outstanding Book of a Musical	Tina Fey	Won
2018	Drama Desk Awards	Outstanding Costume Design	Gregg Barnes	Nominated
2018	Drama Desk Awards	Outstanding Projection Design	Finn Ross & Adam Young	Nominated
2018	Drama Desk Awards	Outstanding Wig and Hair Design	Josh Marquette	Nominated
2018	Drama League Awards	Outstanding Production of a Broadway or Off-Broadway Musical		Nominated
2018	Drama League Awards	Distinguished Performance Award	Taylor Louderman	Nominated
2018	Drama League Awards	Distinguished Performance Award	Ashley Park	Nominated
2018	Outer Critics Circle Awards	Outstanding New Broadway Musical		Nominated
2018	Outer Critics Circle Awards	Outstanding Book of a Musical (Broadway or Off-Broadway)	Tina Fey	Won
2018	Outer Critics Circle Awards	Outstanding Director of a Musical	Casey Nicholaw	Nominated
2018	Outer Critics Circle Awards	Outstanding Leading Actress in a Musical	Erika Henningsen	Nominated
2018	Outer Critics Circle Awards	Outstanding Leading Actress in a Musical	Taylor Louderman	Nominated
2018	Outer Critics Circle Awards	Outstanding Featured Actress in a Musical	Kerry Butler	Nominated
2018	Outer Critics Circle Awards	Outstanding Featured Actress in a Musical	Ashley Park	Nominated
2018	Outer Critics Circle Awards	Outstanding Projection Design (Play or Musical)	Finn Ross & Adam Young	Nominated
2018	Chita Rivera Awards for Dance and Choreography	Outstanding Choreography in a Broadway Show	Casey Nicholaw	Nominated
2018	Chita Rivera Awards for Dance and Choreography	Outstanding Ensemble in a Broadway Show		Won (tie)
2018	Chita Rivera Awards for Dance and Choreography	Outstanding Female Dancer in a Broadway Show	Ashley Park	Nominated

=== London production (2024) ===
Year	Award Ceremony	Category	Nominee	Result
2025	Laurence Olivier Awards	Best Actor in a Supporting Role in a Musical	Tom Xander	Nominated
