= Alyssa Fox =

American singer and actress (born 1986)

- Born: Alyssa Joy Fox; December 19, 1986 (age 39); Dallas, Texas, U.S.
- Occupations: Actress, singer
- Years active: 2010–present
- Known for: Portraying Elphaba in Wicked

Alyssa Joy Fox (born December 19, 1986) is an American stage actress and singer known for her roles in musical theater. She made her Broadway debut as the Elphaba standby in the musical Wicked in 2016.

== Early life ==
Fox is a Dallas, Texas native. She aspired to be a professional singer as a young child and was introduced to musical storytelling through Disney princesses. Fox developed an admiration for live performance during her youth, when she sang in her church's choir and acted in church and school musicals. Her discovery of the musical Wicked through its cast recording in her senior year of high school caused her to focus her future hopes on musical theater. Fox moved to Oklahoma City for college, later dropping out with large amounts of student debt and having to work an hourly job in a mall.

== Career ==
In 2008, Fox auditioned for the role of Wicked's Elphaba in an open cattle call. After many subsequent callback auditions in both San Francisco and New York, she joined the San Francisco production of Wicked as an ensemble member for Elphaba in March 2010. She was the understudy for Eden Espinosa and later Marcie Dodd, before the production closed in September 2010. During her time in San Francisco, she performed the role of Elphaba twice.

Fox then moved to New York and again worked an hourly job until October 2012, when she joined Wicked's national tour, standing by for Christine Dwyer, Jennifer DiNoia, and Laurel Harris, before taking over the role of Elphaba full-time in January 2015.

Fox played her final performance on tour on December 6, 2015, and transferred to the Broadway production as the Elphaba standby on February 2, 2016. During her first stint in the Broadway company, she stood by for Rachel Tucker and Jennifer DiNoia. She left the production on June 11, 2017.

Fox was then part of the original cast of the Broadway production of Frozen as the standby for Elsa. She stayed with the production for its entire Broadway run, from March 2018 to March 2020, when it closed as a result of the COVID-19 pandemic.

She temporarily returned to the Broadway production of Wicked in October 2021, once again standing by for DiNoia, who had temporarily taken over the role of Elphaba full-time while Lindsay Pearce recovered from an injury. Fox left the production in December 2021, when Pearce recovered and DiNoia returned to the standby role. Fox then spent the next few months providing emergency cover for Elphaba, performing the role on the national tour in December 2021 and on Broadway in January 2022, before replacing DiNoia as the Elphaba standby on Broadway in July 2022, standing by for Talia Suskauer until February 2023.

On March 7, 2023, after 13 years with the show, Fox took over the role of Elphaba full-time in the Broadway production. She starred opposite McKenzie Kurtz as Glinda and performed the role at the show's 20th-anniversary performance. She played her final performance as Elphaba on March 3, 2024, and was replaced by Mary Kate Morrissey, who had stood by for Fox in both the touring and Broadway productions.

In June 2025, Fox was cast as Jenna in Theatre Raleigh's production of Waitress.
