= Taylor Louderman =

American actress, singer, and dancer

- Born: Madison, Wisconsin, U.S.
- Education: University of Michigan; The New School (BS)
- Occupations: Actress; singer; dancer
- Years active: 2001–present
- Spouse: Brooks Toth (m. 2020)
- Children: 2
- Website: taylizlou.com

Taylor Louderman is an American actress, singer, and dancer. She is best known for originating the role of Regina George in the Broadway musical Mean Girls, for which she was nominated for the Tony Award for Best Actress in a Musical in 2018.

== Early life and education ==
Louderman was born in Madison, Wisconsin, and then raised in Bourbon, Missouri, a small town 60 miles southwest of St. Louis, Missouri. She is the eldest of five daughters born to Roger and Suzanne Louderman.

In 2001, at the age of 10, she was cast in the title role of Annie at Ozark Actors Theatre in Rolla, Missouri.

She graduated from Sullivan High School and then attended the University of Michigan for two years before leaving the program to star as Campbell in the touring production of Bring It On: The Musical. In 2020, she earned a Bachelor of Science degree in Liberal Arts from The New School.

== Career ==
After her sophomore year at the University of Michigan, Louderman appeared as Margot in 2011 production of Legally Blonde at The Muny in St. Louis, Missouri. It was during this time she learned she had been cast as the lead role of Campbell in the touring production of Bring It On: The Musical. After its national tour, the show then transferred to Broadway in 2012 with Louderman, making her Broadway debut.

Louderman then appeared as Wendy Darling in NBC's 2014 live production of the musical Peter Pan Live!.

She was next seen on Broadway in January 2017, taking over the role of Lauren in Kinky Boots.

Louderman starred as Regina George in the Tony Award-nominated Broadway musical, Mean Girls, written by Tina Fey with music and lyrics by Jeff Richmond and Nell Benjamin, respectively. The show had its world premiere as an out-of-town tryout at the National Theatre in Washington, D.C., from October 31, 2017, to December 3, 2017, in which Louderman originated the role of Regina George. The musical, which is based on the film of the same name, began previews on March 12, 2018, and officially opened on Broadway on April 8, 2018, at the August Wilson Theatre in New York City. She received nominations for numerous awards for this role, including nominations for the Tony Award for Best Actress in a Musical, the Drama League Award, and an Outer Critics Circle Award. Louderman announced via her Instagram that she would be departing Mean Girls on September 8, 2019.

In March 2019, it was reported that Louderman landed a leading role in a new CBS show, The Emperor of Malibu.

As part of The Muny's 101st season, Louderman reprised her role as Lauren in Kinky Boots in June 2019. Calvin Wilson, writing for the St. Louis Post-Dispatch, wrote of her performance: "...In a role that’s too small for her talent, Louderman is a sheer delight."

In July 2019, Louderman announced via her Instagram that, following the conclusion of her current projects, she would be taking a hiatus from performing to focus on writing, teaching, and producing. Posting on July 12, she captioned a photo of herself as Regina George with: "...I have to be honest..though I ask for forgiveness for expressing this if it’s not what you want to hear...I am ready. I am sad being in these shoes most days...still very grateful, but to the younger version of myself who dreamt this all up, I love you, please forgive me and thank you."

In February 2021, Louderman joined the cast of the NBC sitcom Kenan, playing the role of Tami Greenlake.

In 2023, Louderman appeared in Chess at the Muny.

Louderman revealed in 2024 that she had auditioned for the role of Glinda in Wicked.

== Personal life ==
On December 24, 2019, Louderman was engaged to her boyfriend, Brooks Toth. On June 15, 2020, she announced on her Instagram account that she and Toth were married at Jupiter Lighthouse Park in Florida. Louderman announced in August 2022 that she and Toth would be expecting their first child to arrive later that year. She gave birth to a son in January 2023. She gave birth to a second son in September 2024.

== Theatre credits ==
Year	Title	Role	Theatre	Director(s)	Ref.
2001	Annie	Annie	Ozark Actors Theatre		
2008	Joseph and the Amazing Technicolor Dreamcoat	Ensemble	The Robert G. Reim Theatre	Stephen Bourneuf	
2009	Disney's Alice in Wonderland	Rose	The Robert G. Reim Theatre	Ben Nordstrom	
2010	Beauty and the Beast	Ensemble	The Muny	Matt Lenz	
2010	Footloose	Ensemble	The Muny	Paul Blake	
2010	Aida	Amneris	Power Center for the Performing Arts	Richard Grasso	
2011	Legally Blonde	Margot	The Muny	Marc Bruni	
2011	**Bring It On: The Musical**	**Campbell Davis**	Andy Blankenbuehler		
2011	**Bring It On: The Musical**	**Campbell Davis**	Andy Blankenbuehler	U.S. National Tour	
2012	**Bring It On: The Musical**	**Campbell Davis**	Andy Blankenbuehler	**St. James Theatre**	
2013	Footloose	Ariel Moore	Kansas City Starlight Theatre	Mark Madama	
2014	Grease	Sandy Dumbrowski	Paper Mill Playhouse	Daniel Goldstein	
2014	Grease	Sandy Dumbrowski	The Muny	Michael Horsley	
2015	Hairspray	Amber Von Tussle	The Muny	Dan Knechtges	
2015	Gigantic	Ashley Penrod	Vineyard Theatre	Scott Schwartz	
2016	Aida	Amneris	The Muny	Matt Lenz	
2016	Ride the Cyclone	Ocean O'Connell Rosenberg (left the production during previews citing 'creative differences')	Lucille Lortel Theatre	Rachel Rockwell	
2017	**Kinky Boots**	**Lauren** (replacement)	**Al Hirschfeld Theatre**	Jerry Mitchell	
2017	**Mean Girls**	**Regina George**	National Theatre (out-of-town tryout)	Casey Nicholaw	
2018–19	**Mean Girls**	**Regina George**	**August Wilson Theatre**	Casey Nicholaw	
2019	Kinky Boots	Lauren	The Muny	D.B. Bonds	
2023	Chess	Svetlana Sergievsky	The Muny	Josh Rhodes	
2026	South Pacific	Nellie Forbush	The Muny	William Carlos Angulo	

• Credits in bold indicate Broadway production(s)

== Filmography ==
=== Film ===
Year	Title	Role	Notes	Ref.
2008	Shadowland	Obnoxious Girl #1		
2014	Life of an Actress: The Musical	Jen		

=== Television ===
Year	Title	Role	Notes	Ref.
2014	Peter Pan Live!	Wendy Darling	Live television movie	
2016	High Maintenance	Alexa	Episode: "Meth(od)"	
2017–20	Sunny Day	Blair (voice)	60 episodes	
2018	The Good Fight	Tara Strokes	Episode: "Day 492"	
2018	Saturday Night Live	Herself (uncredited)	Episode: "Tina Fey"	
2019	The Emperor of Malibu	Kate	Main role, 1 episode	
2019	The Loudest Voice	Carrie	Episode: “2015”	
2019	Evil	Malindaz	3 episodes	
2020	Kipo and the Age of Wonderbeasts	Carton (voice)	Episode: "Twin Beaks"	
2021-22	Kenan	Tami Greenlake	Recurring (Season 1); Main role (Season 2)	

== Discography ==
=== Cast recordings and soundtracks ===
- Bring It On: The Musical – Original Broadway Cast Recording (2012)
- Peter Pan Live! – Soundtrack from the NBC television event (2014)
- Life of an Actress: The Musical – Original Motion Picture Soundtrack (2015)
- Mean Girls – Original Broadway Cast Recording (2018)

=== Collaborative projects ===
- Broadway's Carols for a Cure, Volume 14 (2012)
- Broadway's Carols for a Cure, Volume 20 (2018)

=== As featured artist ===
- "Rockin' Around the Pole" by The Hot Elves (2018)
- "Break From The Line" by Joey Contreras (2019)
- "Little Miss Perfect" by Joriah Kwamé (2019)

== Other productions ==
- We Chose to Go to the Moon (2026)

== Awards and nominations ==
Year	Award	Category	Nominated work	Result	Ref.
2013	The Fred & Adele Astaire Awards	Outstanding Female Dancer in a Broadway Show	Bring It On	Nominated	
2018	Tony Award	Best Actress in a Musical	Mean Girls	Nominated	
2018	Drama League Award	Distinguished Performance	Mean Girls	Nominated	
2018	Outer Critics Circle Award	Outstanding Actress in a Musical	Mean Girls	Nominated	
2018	Broadway.com Audience Awards	Favorite Diva Performance	Mean Girls	Won	
