= Grey Henson =

American actor, dancer, and singer (born 1990)

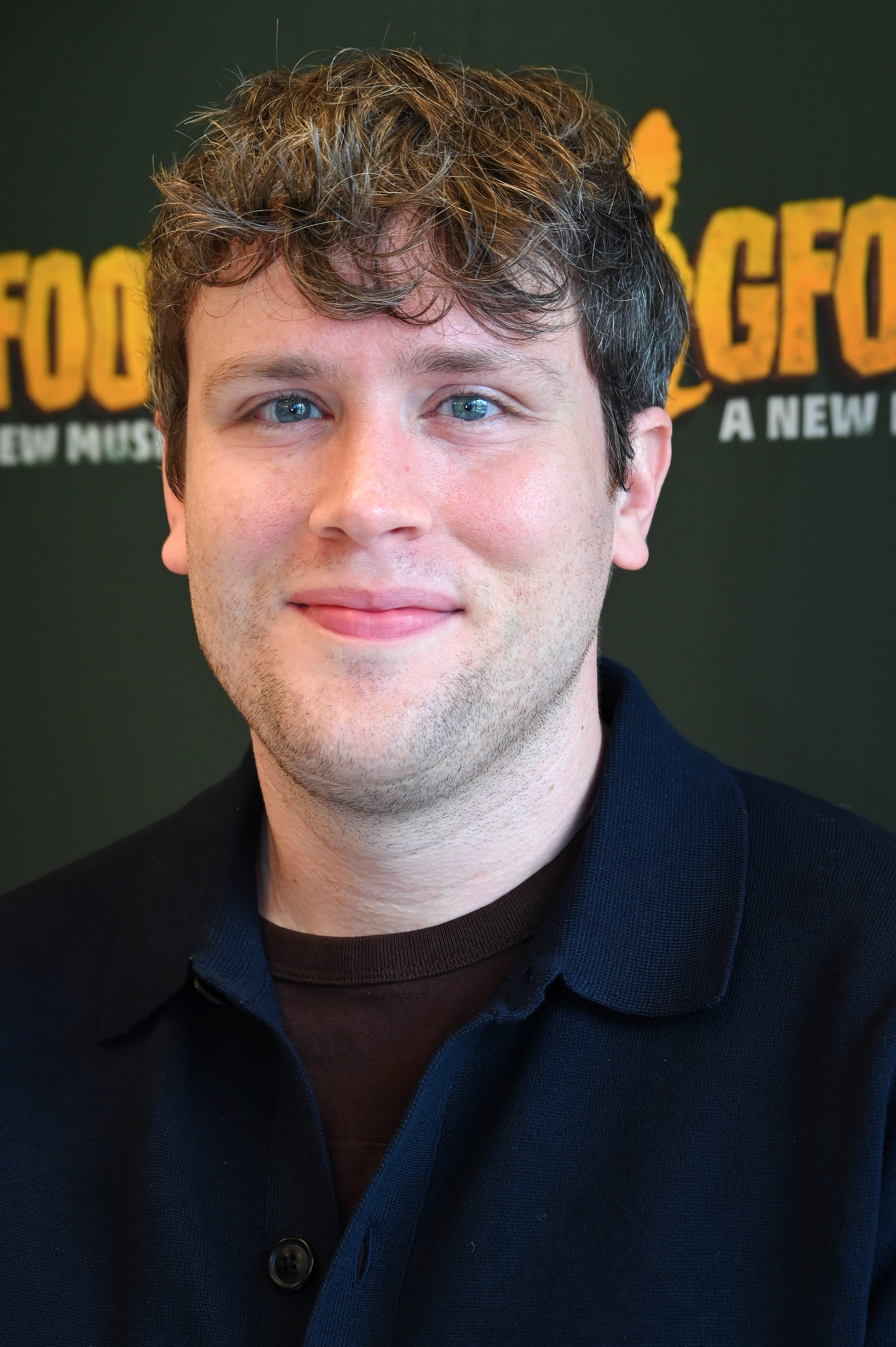
- Henson in 2026
- Born: July 2, 1990 (age 35); Macon, Georgia, U.S.
- Education: Carnegie Mellon University (BFA)
- Occupations: Actor, dancer, singer
- Years active: 2012–present
- Website: greyhenson.com

Grey Henson (born July 2, 1990) is an American actor, dancer, and singer. He originated the role as Damian Hubbard in the Broadway production of Mean Girls, for which he earned a nomination for a 2018 Tony Award for Best Actor in a Featured Role in a Musical, as well as Elder McKinley in the US national touring production of The Book of Mormon. He later reprised the role of Elder McKinley in the Broadway production of the show. Most recently, he starred as Buddy in the 2024 Broadway revival of Elf.

== Early life and education ==
Henson grew up in Macon, Georgia, and was a performer on the stages of Macon Little Theatre, Theatre Macon, and Madison’s School of Dance, which he credits for his love of performing. He is a 2008 YoungArts alumnus.

Henson received a Bachelor of Fine Arts in Acting/Musical Theatre from Carnegie Mellon University School of Drama in 2012. At Carnegie Mellon University, he performed in Assassins as Samuel Byck and Sweeney Todd as Beadle Bamford.

== Career ==
As a junior at Carnegie Mellon, Henson auditioned for the national touring company of The Book of Mormon and ultimately joined the cast in the role of Elder McKinley. The tour began in August 2012. Henson then took over the role on Broadway from August 26, 2014, until August 21, 2016.

Henson joined the original cast of the musical Mean Girls as Damian Hubbard in 2017. The musical, based on the film of the same name, premiered as an out-of-town tryout at the National Theatre in Washington, D.C., on October 31, 2017, and ended December 3, 2017. The musical began previews on Broadway on March 12, 2018, and officially opened April 8, 2018. Co-star Barrett Wilbert Weed and Henson worked together to receive their roles in the production. His final performance in the role was March 8, 2020. Henson called the role "a dream".

In 2022, Henson appeared in the Peacock series Girls5eva as Tate.

== Personal life ==
Henson is openly gay.

== Acting credits ==
=== Theatre ===
Credits in bold indicate Broadway production(s):

Year	Title	Role	Theatre	Director(s)	Ref.
2012-2014	**The Book of Mormon**	Elder McKinley	First U.S. National Tour	Casey Nicholaw and Trey Parker	
2014-2016	**The Book of Mormon**	**Elder McKinley (replacement)**	**Eugene O'Neill Theatre**	Casey Nicholaw and Trey Parker	
2017	**Mean Girls**	**Damian Hubbard**	National Theatre (out-of-town tryout)	Casey Nicholaw	
2018-2020	**Mean Girls**	**Damian Hubbard**	**August Wilson Theatre**	Casey Nicholaw	
2023-2024	**Shucked**	**Storyteller 2**	**Nederlander Theatre**	Jack O'Brien	
2024	tick, tick...BOOM!	Michael	Kennedy Center	Neil Patrick Harris	
2024	Follies	Young Buddy	Carnegie Hall	Jack Cummings III	
2024-2025	**Elf**	**Buddy the Elf**	**Marquis Theatre**	Philip Wm. McKinley	
2025	Hello, Dolly!	Cornelius Hackl	Carnegie Hall	Jack Cummings III	
2025	Bigfoot! The Musical	Bigfoot	Manhattan Theatre Club	David Mefford	
2026	Iceboy!	The Iceboy	Goodman Theatre	Marc Bruni	

=== Television ===
Year	Title	Role	Notes	Ref.
2013	Suburgatory	Alec	Episode: "Blowtox and Burlap"	
2018	Saturday Night Live	Himself (uncredited)	Episode: "Tina Fey"	
2022	Girls5eva	Tate	5 episodes	
2026	Love Story	Tommy	3 episodes	

== Accolades ==
Year	Award	Category	Nominated work	Result	Ref.
2014	Helen Hayes Awards	Outstanding Supporting Performer - Visiting Production	The Book of Mormon	Nominated	
2018	Tony Awards	Best Actor in a Featured Role in a Musical	Mean Girls	Nominated	
2018	Broadway.com Audience Awards	Favorite Featured Actor in a Featured Role in a Musical	Mean Girls	Won	
2018	Broadway.com Audience Awards	Favorite Onstage Pair (with Barrett Wilbert Weed)	Mean Girls	Won	
2018	Drama Desk Awards	Outstanding Actor in a Featured Role in a Musical	Mean Girls	Nominated	
2018	Helen Hayes Awards	Outstanding Performer - Visiting Production	Mean Girls	Nominated	
2025	Drama Desk Awards	Outstanding Lead Performance in a Musical	Elf	Nominated	
2026	Drama League Award	Distinguished Performance	Bigfoot!	Nominated	
