= Janis Ian (Mean Girls) =

- Mean Girls character
- Lizzy Caplan as Janis Ian in Mean Girls
- First appearance: Mean Girls (2004)
- Last appearance: Mean Girls (2024)
- Created by: Tina Fey
- Portrayed by: Lizzy Caplan (2004 film); Barrett Wilbert Weed (stage musical); Auliʻi Cravalho (2024 film)

In-universe information
- Full name: Janis Ian (2004 film); Janis Sarkisian (stage musical); Janis ʻImiʻike (2024 film)
- Nicknames: Dyke (2004 film); Space Dyke (stage musical); Pyro-lez (2024 film)
- Occupation: Student at North Shore High
- Significant others: Kevin Gnapoor (2004 film); Unnamed Girlfriend (2024 film)
- Nationality: American-Lebanese
- Education: North Shore High
- Residence: Evanston, Illinois, United States

Janis Ian, also referred to as Janis Sarkisian or Janis ʻImiʻike in the musical versions, is a character from the Mean Girls franchise.

She is portrayed by Lizzy Caplan in the original 2004 film, Barrett Wilbert Weed in its Broadway musical version and by Auliʻi Cravalho in the musical film.

Janis is the best friend of Damian Leigh (or Damian Hubbard in the musical), and ex-best friend of Regina George. Her main goal throughout the story is to get revenge on Regina for spreading rumours about her, and she does this through the use of new girl Cady Heron, who is enlisted to help Janis take down Regina.

Janis' character was written by Tina Fey. The character originally shared a name with a folk singer who appeared on the series premiere of Saturday Night Live on October 11, 1975, and had a Top Ten single "At Seventeen" from her album Between the Lines, which reached no. 1 on the U.S. Billboard 200 chart in September 1975 when Fey was five years old. The song is a stirring critique on high school angst, popularity delusions and teen barbarity. The singer was outed in 1976 and came out as a lesbian in 1993 with the release of Breaking Silence, her album which confronts teenage suicide and related issues. "At Seventeen" is played faintly during a scene in the 2004 version of Mean Girls.

== Biography ==
Janis Ian as a character (in the 2004 film) is depicted as a gothic or emo girl of Lebanese ancestry. She was best friends with Regina George throughout her childhood and was previously very fashionable and feminine. This all changed in eighth grade after Regina got her first boyfriend Kyle. Janis was upset that Regina was spending more time with Kyle than her, which annoyed Regina to the point that Regina did not invite her to her birthday pool party. Regina told Janis that she did not invite her because she thought Janis was a lesbian. This resulted in Janis's mother calling Regina's mother and shouting at her. After the incident, Janis had shaved half her hair and left school due to being upset about Regina's treatment of her. During her time away, Janis developed a different style and expression, that being her now-iconic gothic punk image, and grew a bitter hatred towards Regina for making everyone think she was a lesbian.

Janis returned to North Shore High some time before Cady Heron joined. She stayed away from Regina and befriended Damian Leigh in that time.

For the musical film adaptation, the role of Janis Ian is replaced by "Janis ʻImiʻike", an actual lesbian ("Pyro-Lez"), infamously known for lighting part of Regina's backpack on fire during middle school.

== Personality ==
Janis is a punk rocker outcast who is witty, artistic, manipulative, and opinionated. She sometimes can seem aggressive, as she cares deeply about her revenge on Regina. However, she has a rather healthy friendship with Damian Hubbard and Cady Heron (though she does use Cady to get revenge on Regina). She is notable for being rather teasing with said friends, calling Cady "Caddie" and poking fun at Damien for being "too gay to function". She is fine with being considered an outcast, but is angry that she has been called a lesbian when she is not one (in the newer version of the film, she is fine with people knowing she is a lesbian, but dislikes when people mention her friendship with Regina).

== Role in Mean Girls ==
Janis begins the movie as a social outcast, and is always seen with Damian. Janis befriends Cady Heron and encourages her to pursue a friendship with the Plastics when she sits with them on her second day, with the goal of using Cady to find a way to take down Regina George as revenge for their fall out. While Cady initially sees Regina as sweet, Janis warns her the opposite is true. After Cady returns to Janis's house from a Halloween party in tears after Regina kissed her crush, Aaron Samuels, Janis concocts a plan to take down Regina, by ruining her relationship with Aaron and the other Plastics, and making her body fat.

While plotting against Regina, Cady learns about Regina and Janis's past friendship around 8th grade, which crumbled as Regina believed Janis was lesbian (and had a crush on her) and spread rumours because of it. Cady slowly stops talking to Janis afterwards and the two hardly talked by the time Cady successfully overthrew Regina. The friendship was broken after Cady lied about being unable to attend Janis's art show due to going to a show with her parents in Madison the same night, when she actually stayed home and threw a party without inviting Damian or Janis. When they find out about this, they drive to her house and chastise her, which collapses their relationship.

When the Burn Book is released (where Janis is called "dyke", a lesbian slur), there is a riot and then the girls have to attend an apology workshop in the gymnasium. During Janis's apology, she reveals everything that she and Cady had done to Regina and at the end of her speech, she jokes that the reason she hates Regina so much is because of her "big, lesbian crush" on her, before receiving cheers from the other girls. At the Spring Fling dance, Janis is nominated for Spring Fling Queen (as Damian had rigged the vote as a joke) alongside Cady, Gretchen and Regina. She loses the crown to Cady, but is given a piece of it from Cady as a sign of mending bridges and forgives her. Janis ends the movie being friends with Cady and Damian and having begun a relationship with Kevin Gnapoor.

== Role in Mean Girls (2018 musical) ==
Janis was included in Mean Girls' musical adaptation of the same name on Broadway, with the last name changed to Sarkisian. The role was originated by Barrett Wilbert Weed.

Janis's character is similar to in the original film. In the film, Janis befriends Cady in class; in the musical, Janis and Damian Hubbard befriend Cady in the girls' bathroom to help her find a way to fit in.

In the musical, Janis (along with Damian) functions as a narrator to the audience as well as a character in the story, occasionally directly addressing the audience, especially in the opening scene ("A Cautionary Tale").

== Role in Mean Girls (2024) ==
Janis' character remains very close to the original 2004 film and musical; however, one notable change is with her sexuality and ethnicity. Here she is openly gay and Polynesian instead of Lebanese. While the original film had the subtle final punchline of Janis being Lebanese as why Regina had thought she was a lesbian (having misheard her the first time she mentioned it), the 2024 film version sees Damien say that Janis came out to Regina by getting matching plushes with pride pins but that after playing a game of spin the bottle during a party, Regina began flaunting around the plush, naming it Sissy Lez, an abbreviation for "obsessed lesbian", believing that Janis had a crush on her and was upset that she had to watch Regina kiss boys during the game. This infuriated Janis so much she lit the plush on fire, which also caused Regina's bag to set on fire. Near the end of the film, Janis is seen attending the Spring Fling with an unnamed girlfriend. She is referred to by the surname ʻImiʻike and is played by Auliʻi Cravalho.

== Reception ==
Janis's character has been perceived as more villainous as time goes on, but the character is still positively received.
