= Desmond Chiam =

Australian actor

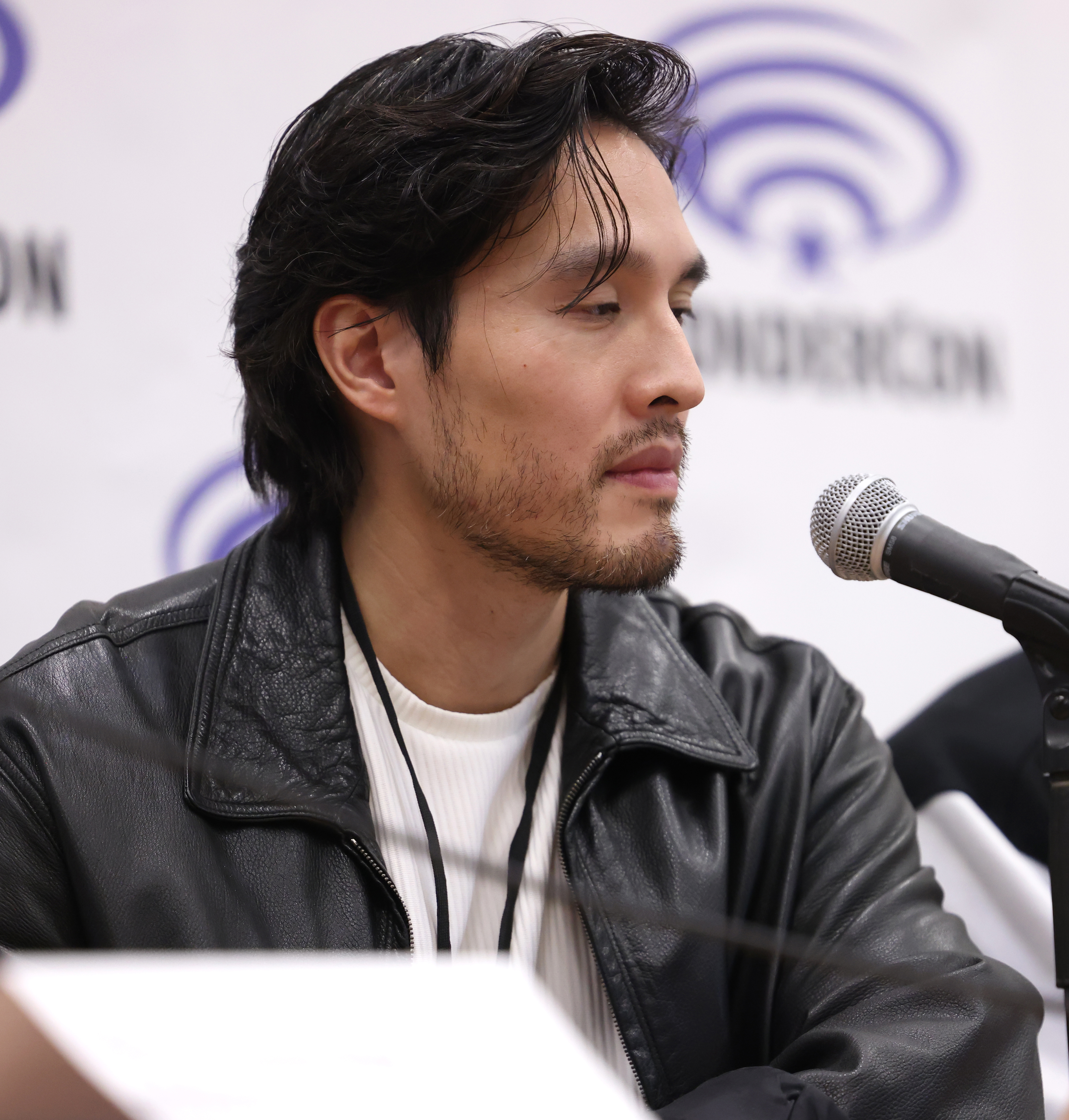
- Occupation: Actor
- Years active: 2007–present
- Spouse: Sami Jayne (m. 2015)

Desmond Chiam is an Australian actor. He is best known for his roles as Wyatt Cole on Reef Break, General Riga on The Shannara Chronicles, Dovich on The Falcon and the Winter Soldier and as the Edenian King Jerrod in the martial arts action dark fantasy film Mortal Kombat II.

== Early life and education ==
Chiam was born to parents of Chinese Singaporean descent. As a child, he spent a third of the year in Singapore due to his father's job. He holds a law degree from the University of Melbourne and a master's degree in screenwriting from University of Southern California.

== Career ==
Chiam began working as a lawyer after he graduated from the University of Melbourne. After becoming unsatisfied with a law career, he decided to pursue breakdancing and acting.

He began acting in Australian short films before eventually appearing in Australian television series such as Neighbours and Better Man. He eventually moved to Los Angeles to pursue a career in acting. Chiam has had roles in multiple American television series including NCIS: Los Angeles and Bones. He has also appeared in Con Man, a webseries by Alan Tudyk.

In February 2017, he joined the main cast of Spike TV's The Shannara Chronicles (the series was formerly on MTV) in the show's second season where he played the villain, General Riga. In 2018, he was cast as Jethro in the Starz series Now Apocalypse starring Avan Jogia. He then joined the cast of the Manila-set film Empty by Design, which featured alongside Chris Pang, Osric Chau, and Yoshi Sudarso.

In December 2018, he was cast as Wyatt Cole, the male lead in ABC and M6's 2019 crime series Reef Break opposite Poppy Montgomery. Following Reef Break's cancellation, Chiam joined the cast of the Marvel series The Falcon and the Winter Soldier as Dovich.

Chiam appears as Nick Zhao in Amazon's With Love, a romantic comedy television series that aired from 2021 to 2023. He provided the English voice of Werewolf Cookie in the video game Cookie Run: Kingdom.

In 2022, he appeared in Netflix's Partner Track, which starred Arden Cho. Chiam starred alongside Sherry Cola, Stephanie Hsu, Ashley Park, and Sabrina Wu in Joy Ride (2023), Adele Lim's directorial debut.

== Personal life ==
Chiam was CLEO Singapore's Bachelor of the Year in 2011.

As of 2019, he resides in Los Angeles with his wife.

== Filmography ==
Year	Title	Role	Notes	Refs
2012	Neighbours	Jack Dutton	1 episode	
2013	Better Man	Hong	Film	
2016	Bones		1 episode	
2016	NCIS: Los Angeles	Edward Lee	1 episode	
2016	Con Man		1 episode	
2017	The Shannara Chronicles	General Riga	Main cast (season 2)	
2018	Hawaii Five-0	Kazuya Nemoto	1 episode	
2018	Asian Bachelorette 2	Aden	YouTube film from Wong Fu Productions	
2018	We Were Tomorrow	Kuo	4 episodes	
2019	Empty by Design	Chance		
2019	Now Apocalypse	Jethro	Main cast	
2019	Reef Break	Wyatt Cole	Main cast; lead role	
2020	Magic Camp	Xerxes	Film	
2021	The Falcon and the Winter Soldier	Dovich	Miniseries; 6 episodes	
2021	Cookie Run: Kingdom	Werewolf Cookie	Video game	
2021–2023	With Love	Nick Zhao	Main cast	
2022	Partner Track	Z Min		
2023	So Help Me Todd	Peter Chen	Episode: "Wall of Fire"	
2023	Joy Ride	Clarence		
2024	Five Blind Dates	Apollo	Amazon Prime	
2026	Mortal Kombat II	King Jerrod	Film	
