= The 2024 Queerties Awards =

Awards for contributions by LGBTQ+ community

- Awarded for: contributions and achievements by members of the LGBTQ+ community.
- Sponsored by: Lexus; FX
- Date: March 12, 2024
- Venue: The Avalon Hollywood, LA
- Country: United States
- Presented by: Queerty
- Hosted by: Jinkx Monsoon

Highlights
- Most wins: Heartstopper (2)
- Website: queerty.com/queerties/

Television/radio coverage
- Produced by: Q.Digital

The 2024 Queerties Awards took place on March 12, 2024, at The Avalon Hollywood in Los Angeles, hosted by Jinkx Monsoon. The 12th annual edition honored the LGBTQ+ community's brightest stars and innovators in entertainment, and were chosen by the public throughout Queerty's website.

Honorees included Trace Lysette with the Groundbreaker Award, Rosie O'Donnell with the Icon Award, and Paula Abdul with the Straight Up Ally Award. The biggest winner of the night was the British series Heartstopper with two wins.

== Winners and nominees ==
The full nominations were announced on January 24, 2024:

Music

Breakout Musical Artist
Reneé Rapp; Ice Spice (Runner-Up); La Cruz; Durand Bernarr; Bronze Avery; Corook; The Scarlet Opera; Victoria Monét; Shinjiro Atae; Baby Queen
Music Video	Anthem
"One of Your Girls" — Troye Sivan; "Looking Good, Feeling Gorgeous" — Trixie Mattel (Runner-Up); "River" — Miley Cyrus; "Take Me Home" — VINCINT; "Mil Veces" — Anitta; "One Margarita" — That Chick Angel, Casa Di, & Steve Terrell featuring Saucy Santana; "Never Ending Song" — Conan Gray; "Lipstick Lover" — Janelle Monáe; "Afraid To Love" — David Archuleta; "Wig" — Baby Tate	"Padam Padam" — Kylie Minogue; "Rush" — Troye Sivan (Runner-Up); "Super Graphic Ultra Modern Girl" — Chappell Roan; "Not Strong Enough" — Boygenius; "Vulgar" — Sam Smith and Madonna; "Let Loose" — Loosey LaDuca; "Ice Slippin" — Omar Apollo; "Boy's A Liar Pt. 2" — PinkPantheress and Ice Spice; "Story Of A Boy" — JORDY; "Alone" — Kim Petras featuring Nicki Minaj

Television/Streaming

TV Performance
Kit Connor — Heartstopper; Vico Ortiz — Our Flag Means Death (Runner-Up); Miss Benny — Glamorous; Matt Bomer — Fellow Travelers; Harvey Guillén — What We Do In The Shadows; Jasmin Savoy Brown — Yellowjackets; Omar Ayuso — Elite; Tituss Burgess — Schmigadoon!; Murray Bartlett — The Last Of Us; Sara Ramirez — And Just Like That...
TV Comedy	TV Drama
Heartstopper; Our Flag Means Death (Runner-Up); With Love; What We Do In The Shadows; Sex Education; Glamorous; The Other Two; Somebody Somewhere; Schmigadoon!; And Just Like That...	The Last of Us; Fellow Travelers (Runner-Up); The Fall of The House of Usher; The Gilded Age; Gen V; The Morning Show; The Crown; Foundation; Yellowjackets; Elite
Reality/Docuseries	Web Series
RuPaul's Drag Race; Queer Eye (Runner-Up); Swiping America; Never Let Him Go; Survivor; Drag Me to Dinner; The Ultimatum: Queer Love; Living for the Dead; Last Call: When a Serial Killer Stalked Queer New York; For the Love of DILFS	Helluva Boss; UNHhhh (Runner-Up); The Walk In With Mo Heart; Fashion Photo RuView; Single, Out; Avalon TV; The TonyTalks Cinematic Universe; Give It To Me Straight With Maddy Morphosis; The Terrell Show; Off Shoot

Films

Film Performance
Dan Levy — Good Grief; Andrew Scott — All Of Us Strangers (Runner-Up); Lío Mehiel — Mutt; Nathan Lane — Dicks: The Musical; Jodie Foster — Nyad; Colman Domingo — Rustin; Sherry Cola — Joy Ride; Lily Gladstone — Killers Of The Flower Moon; Kaimana — Next Goal Wins; Trace Lysette — Monica
Comedy Movie	Drama Movie
Barbie; Red, White & Royal Blue (Runner-Up); Summoning Sylvia; Bottoms; Mean Girls; Joy Ride; Dicks: The Musical; Down Low; The Blackening; Theater Camp	Saltburn; The Color Purple (Runner-Up); All Of Us Strangers; Cassandro; Knock At The Cabin; Rock Hudson: All That Heaven Allowed; Monica; Nyad; Passages; Rustin

Drag

Drag Royalty	Future All-Star
Jimbo; Pattie Gonia (Runner-Up); Priyanka; Flamy Grant; Boulet Brothers; Meatball; Pablo Vittar; Mo Heart; Sherry Vine; K. James	Anetra; Kim Chi (Runner-Up); Bosco; Salina EsTitties; Gottmik; Gigi Goode; Marcia Marcia Marcia; Mistress Isabelle Brooks; Luxx Noir London; Jackie Cox

Miscellaneous

TikToker (presented by Lexus)	Insta-Follow (presented by Lexus)
Sugar & Spice (@sugarandspice); Chris Olsen (@chris) (Runner-Up); Zachariah Porter (@zzzachariah); Alex Consani (@captincroook); Rosie O'Donnell (@rosie); Skylar Marie (@skylarrr_marie); Spencer West (@spencer2thewest); Thee Muses (@theemuses); V Spehar (@underthedesknews); Naomi Hearts (@naomiheartsxo)	Matt Bernstein (@mattxiv); Matthew & Paul (@matthewandpaul) (Runner-Up); E. R. Fightmaster (@genderless_gap_ad); Ricky Martin (@ricky_martin); Team 2 Moms (@team2moms); Zaya Wade (@zayawade); Bruno Alcantara (@brunocalcantara); Brian Jordan Alvarez (@brianjordanalvarez); Chrishell Stause (@chrishell.stause); Tommy DiDario (@Tommy DiDario)
Coming Out for Good	Style Icon
Joe Locke; Adore Delano (Runner-Up); Curtis Hamilton; Gabby Windey; Kris Tyson; Alexander Lincoln; Karan Brar; Wayne Brady; Anderson Comas; Kevin Maxen	Hunter Schafer; Bretman Rock (Runner-Up); Richie Shazam; Brandon Blackwood; Jon Kortajarena; Diego Montoya; Rio Uribe; Jenna Lyons; Christian Siriano; Law Roach
Badass (presented by Lexus)	Sports Hero
Bella Ramsey; Ncuti Gatwa (Runner-Up); Bob the Drag Queen; John Waters; Dylan Mulvaney; Breanna Stewart; Billy Porter; Robert Garcia; Sasha Colby; Gio Benitez	Sha'Carri Richardson; Brittney Griner (Runner-Up); Heath Thorpe; Ali Krieger; Anthony Bowens; Nikki Hiltz; Robbie Manson; Isaac Humphries; Byron Perkins; Daria Kasatkina
Podcast	Read
Race Chaser by Alaska Thunderfuck and Willam Belli; Very Delta by Delta Work (Runner-Up); Surface Level Podcast by Jordan Randall, Damon Epps and Tony Jermin; Everything Iconic by Danny Pellegrino; Gayotic by MUNA; Like A Virgin by Rose Dommu and Fran Tirado; Handsome by Fortune Feimster, Tig Notaro and Mae Martin; Maintenance Phase by Michael Hobbes and Aubrey Gordon; Las Culturistas by Matt Rogers and Bowen Yang; Tres Leches by Ian Paget, Johnny Sibilly and Juan Torres-Falcon	Pageboy by Elliot Page; The Big Reveal by Sasha Velour (Runner-Up); The Male Gazed by Manuel Betancourt; The Yards Between Us by R.K. Russell; Quietly Hostile by Samantha Irby; Inverse Cowgirl by Alicia Roth Weigel; XOXO, Cody by Cody Rigsby; Guide To The Good Life by The Old Gays; He/She/They by Schuyler Bailar; The Best Strangers In The World by Ari Shapiro
Comic	Live Theater
Matteo Lane; Mo'Nique (Runner-Up); Brandon Rogers; Ana Fabrega; Jay Jurden; Robby Hoffman; Alec Mapa; Kid Fury; Patti Harrison; Sabrina Wu	The Jinkx & DeLa Holiday Show; Brokeback Mountain (Runner-Up); Broadway Bares: Pleasure Park; Kimberly Akimbo; Spamalot; Good Night, Oscar; Merrily We Roll Along; Fat Ham; Dark Disabled Stories; American Psycho
Best Feud (presented by FX's Feud: Capote vs. The Swans)	Next Big Thing
Coco Montrese vs. Alyssa Edwards; Joan Rivers vs. Miss Piggy (Runner-Up); Mariah Carey vs. J.Lo; Elizabeth Taylor vs. Debbie Reynolds; Bette Davis vs. Joan Crawford; Sarah Jessica Parker vs. Kim Cattrall; Elton John vs. Madonna; Naomi Campbell vs. Tyra Banks; Perez Hilton vs. Neil Patrick Harris	Young Royals: Season 3; Trixie Motel: Drag Me Home (Runner-Up); Challengers; Wicked: Part 1; Beetlejuice 2; Joker: Folie à Deux; Borderlands; P-Valley: Season 3; RuPaul's Drag Race Global All-Stars; Mufasa: The Lion King

Honors

Groundbreaker	Icon	Straight Up Ally Award
Trace Lysette	Rosie O’Donnell	Paula Abdul

== Most wins ==
List of two or more winners:

Field	Nominees	Wins	Awards
TV	Heartstopper	2	TV Comedy; TV Performance (Kit Connor)

== Most nominations ==
List of most nominated individuals, and projects:

Field	Nominees	Total
Artists	Trace Lysette, Rosie O'Donnell, Ice Spice	2
TV	Heartstopper, Fellow Travelers, Glamorous, Our Flag Means Death, The Last of Us, Yellowjackets, What We Do in the Shadows, Elite, Schmigadoon!, And Just Like That...	2
Film	All of Us Strangers, Monica, Nyad, Rustin, Dicks: The Musical, Joy Ride	2
