= The 2023 Queerties Awards =

Awards for contributions by LGBTQ+ community

- Awarded for: contributions and achievements by members of the LGBTQ+ community.
- Sponsored by: Lexus
- Date: February 28, 2023
- Venue: Eden Sunset, LA
- Country: United States
- Presented by: Queerty
- Hosted by: Bianca Del Rio

Highlights
- Most wins: Heartstopper (2)
- Website: queerty.com/queerties/

Television/radio coverage
- Produced by: Q.Digital

The 2023 Queerties Awards took place on February 28, 2023, at Eden Sunset in Los Angeles, hosted by Bianca Del Rio. The 11th annual edition honored the LGBTQ+ community's brightest stars and innovators in entertainment, and were chosen by the public throughout Queerty's website.

Honorees included Dylan Mulvaney with the Groundbreaker Award, and Rufus Wainwright with the Icon Award. The biggest winner of the night was the British series Heartstopper with two wins.

== Winners and nominees ==
The list of winners were announced on February 28, 2023:

Music

Breakout Musical Artist
Omar Rudberg; Omar Apollo (Runner-Up); Madison Rose; Doechii; Zee Machine; Gia Woods; Ocean Kelly; Sam Williams; Chappell Roan; Lagoona Bloo
Music Video	Anthem
"A Meia Noite" — Pabllo Vittar and Gloria Groove; "Black" — Bob the Drag Queen, Basit, & Ocean Kelly (Runner-Up); "Let Go & Your Name" — Shea Couleé; "Becky's So Hot" — Fletcher; "The Loneliest Time" — Carly Rae Jepsen featuring Rufus Wainwright; "C'mon Loretta" — Trixie Mattel; "This Hell" — Rina Sawayama; "Away From You" — Zach Campbell; "The Curse of the Blackened Eye" — Orville Peck; "I Get High" — Jordy	"Unholy" — Sam Smith featuring Kim Petras; "Cozy" — Beyoncé featuring Honey Dijon & Ts Madison (Runner-Up); "Boys Don't Cry" [Live] — Anitta featuring Miley Cyrus; "What I Want" — MUNA; "Booty" — Santana and Latto; "Hold Me Closer" — Elton John and Britney Spears; "Everybody's Gay" — Lizzo; "You and Me On The Rock" — Brandi Carlile featuring Lucius; "Bad Habit" — Steve Lacy; "Boyfriend" — Dove Cameron

Television/Streaming

TV Performance
Joe Locke — Heartstopper; Emma D'Arcy — House Of The Dragon (Runner-Up); Devery Jacobs — Reservation Dogs; Harvey Guillén — What We Do In The Shadows; Nicco Annan — P-Valley; Jeff Hiller — Somebody, Somewhere; Michaela Jaé Rodriguez — Loot; Bilal Baig — Sort Of; Johnny Sibilly — Queer As Folk; Vico Ortiz — Our Flag Means Death; Abbi Jacobson — A League Of Their Own; Murray Bartlett — Welcome To Chippendales
TV Comedy	TV Drama
Heartstopper; The White Lotus (Runner-Up); I Love That For You; Smiley; What We Do In The Shadows; Sort Of; Reservation Dogs; A League Of Their Own; Uncoupled; Hacks	Euphoria; Young Royals (Runner-Up); Queer As Folk; Elite; Interview With The Vampire; P-Valley; The L Word: Generation Q; Welcome To Chippendales; Severance; American Horror Story: NYC
Reality/Docuseries	Web Series
Trixie Motel; We're Here (Runner-Up); Lesbian Bar Project; Queer for Fear; Legendary; Bargain Block; The Andy Warhol Diaries; The Boulet Brothers' Dragula: Titans; The Book of Queer; The Big Brunch	IMHO: The Show; The Walk In With Mo Heart (Runner-Up); The Michael Henry Cinematic Universe; Moonie; I Need Space; Translation; Adam In Fragments; WeHost with Zach Noe Towers & Darren Bluestone; Interested In; Avocado Toast

Films

Film Performance
Janelle Monáe — Glass Onion: A Knives Out Mystery; Stephanie Hsu — Everything Everywhere All At Once (Runner-Up); Jamie Clayton — Hellraiser; Eva Reign — Anything's Possible; Conrad Ricamora — Fire Island; Billy Eichner — Bros; Amandla Stenberg — Bodies Bodies Bodies; Jeremy Pope — The Inspection; Troye Sivan — Three Months; Ben Aldridge — Spoiler Alert
Studio Movie	Independent Movie
Everything Everywhere All at Once; Bros (Runner-Up); Bodies Bodies Bodies; Anything's Possible; Tár; Spoiler Alert; Better Nate Than Ever; The Inspection; Fire Island; My Policeman	Firebird; Three Months (Runner-Up); Close; Benediction; Wildhood; Girl Picture; Joyland; Please Baby Please; We're All Going to the World's Fair; The Swimmer

Drag

Drag Royalty	Future All-Star
Raja; Alaska 5000 (Runner-Up); Honey Mahogany; Eureka!; Victoria E. Black; Victoria Scone; Hot Chocolate/Larry Edwards; Willow Pill; Tenderoni; Militia Scunt	Kornbread; Plastique Tiara (Runner-Up); Thirsty Von Trapp a.k.a Mark Indelicato; Vanessa Vanjie Mateo; Kerri Colby; Miss Fiercalicious; Jasmine Kennedie; Jorgeous; Angeria Paris VanMicheals; Tempest DuJour

Miscellaneous

Favorite TikToker	Favorite Insta-Follow
Kelon (@_itzpsyiconic_); Chris Olsen (@chris) (Runner-Up); Garrett Clayton (@garrettclayton1); Henry Jiménez Kerbox (@henryjimenezkerbox); Austin Cho (@asianchipskylark); Megan Mitchell (@megan.mitchellll); Ebony and Denise (@team2moms); Emira D’Spain (@xoxoemira); Boman Martinez-Reid (@bomanizer); Juwan Gutierrez (@misocolorful)	TonyTalks (@iamtonytalks); George Takei (@georgehtakei) (Runner-Up); Jazz Jennings (@jazzjennings_); Reneé Rapp (@reneerapp); GFlip (@gflip); Benito Skinner (@bennydrama7); Dominique Jackson (@dominiquet.a.r.jackson); Laith Ashley (@laith_ashley); Jonathan Bennett (@jonathanbennett); Matt Bernstein (@mattxiv)
Badass	Closet Door Bustdown (presented by Lexus)
Jinkx Monsoon; Keke Palmer (Runner-Up); Joel Kim Booster; David Archuleta; Jerrod Carmichael; Yasmin Finney; Jim Parsons; Ryan O'Connell; Ts Madison; Rosie O'Donnell	Noah Schnapp; Queens of Drag Race Season 14: Bosco, Jasmine Kennedie, Kornbread, Willow Pill (Runner-Up); Maybelle Blair; Rebel Wilson; TJ House; Aunjanue Ellis; Tevin Campbell; Ellia Green; Kit Connor; Sanjaya Malakar
Podcast	Best Read
Sibling Rivalry by Monét X. Change and Bob the Drag Queen; Hi Jinkx! (Runner-Up); Hall and Closet by Jaida Essence Hall and Heidi N Closet; MLVC: The Madonna Podcast by Stefan Mreczko, Liberty King & Tony Trius; Lez Hang Out; Still Processing by J Wortham and Wesley Morris; Breakfast Buffet by Cole Escola and Jeffery Self; Vibe Check by Sam Sanders, Zach Stafford, and Saeed Jones; Las Culturistas by Matt Rogers and Bowen Yang; FANTI by Jarrett Hill and Tre'vell Anderson	Working Girls by Trixie and Katya; The You Kind Of Kind by Nina West (Runner-Up); Let's Not Do That Again by Grant Ginder; Miss Memory Lane by Colton Haynes; This Time For Me by Alexandra Billings; My Government Means To Kill Me by Rasheed Newson; Just By Looking At Him by Ryan O'Connell; You Gotta Be You by Brandon Kyle Goodman; The One You Want To Marry by Sophie Santos; Daughters Of The New Year by E.M. Tran
Comic	Live Theater
Nicole Byer; Matteo Lane (Runner-Up); Fortune Feimster; Matt Rogers; Rob Anderson; Jerrod Carmichael; Meg Stalter; Mae Martin; Dewayne Perkins; Sherry Cola	DRAG: The Musical; Take Me Out (Runner-Up); Fat Ham; Melissa Etheridge: My Window - A Journey Through Life; Best of Enemies; & Juliet; Merrily We Roll Along; Titaníque; The Collaboration; A Strange Loop
Documentary	Girl, Bye
Access All Areas: The AAA Girls Tour; George Michael: Freedom Uncut (Runner-Up); Stay On Board: The Leo Baker Story; Holding Moses; Mama's Boy; Framing Agnes; All Man: The International Male Story; God Forbid; All The Beauty And The Bloodshed; A Sexplanation	Kanye West; J.K. Rowling (Runner-Up); Ron DeSantis; Kevin Sorbo; Ginni Thomas; Candace Cameron Bure; George Santos; Kevin McCarthy; Elon Musk; Laura Ingraham
Next Big Thing
The Little Mermaid; Barbie (Runner-Up); The Color Purple; Yellowjackets: Season 2; Legally Blonde 3; Oppenheimer; They Both Die At The End; Fellow Travelers; Nyad; Rustin

Honors

Groundbreaker	Icon
Dylan Mulvaney	Rufus Wainwright

== Most wins ==
List of two or more winners:

Field	Nominees	Wins	Awards
TV	Heartstopper	"TV Comedy"; "TV Performance" (Joe Locke)	2

== Most nominations ==
List of most nominated individuals, and projects:

Field	Nominees	Total
Artists	Ryan O'Connell; Matt Rogers; Ts Madison; Bob the Drag Queen; Trixie Mattel; Jerrod Carmichael; Jasmine Kennedie; Kornbread; Willow Pill	2
TV	Heartstopper; Welcome To Chippendales; A League Of Their Own; Sort Of; Queer As Folk; Reservation Dogs; What We Do In The Shadows; P-Valley	2
Film	Everything Everywhere All At Once; Anything's Possible; Fire Island; Bros; Spoiler Alert; The Inspection; Fire Island; Three Months	2
