= Sabrina Wu =

American comedian

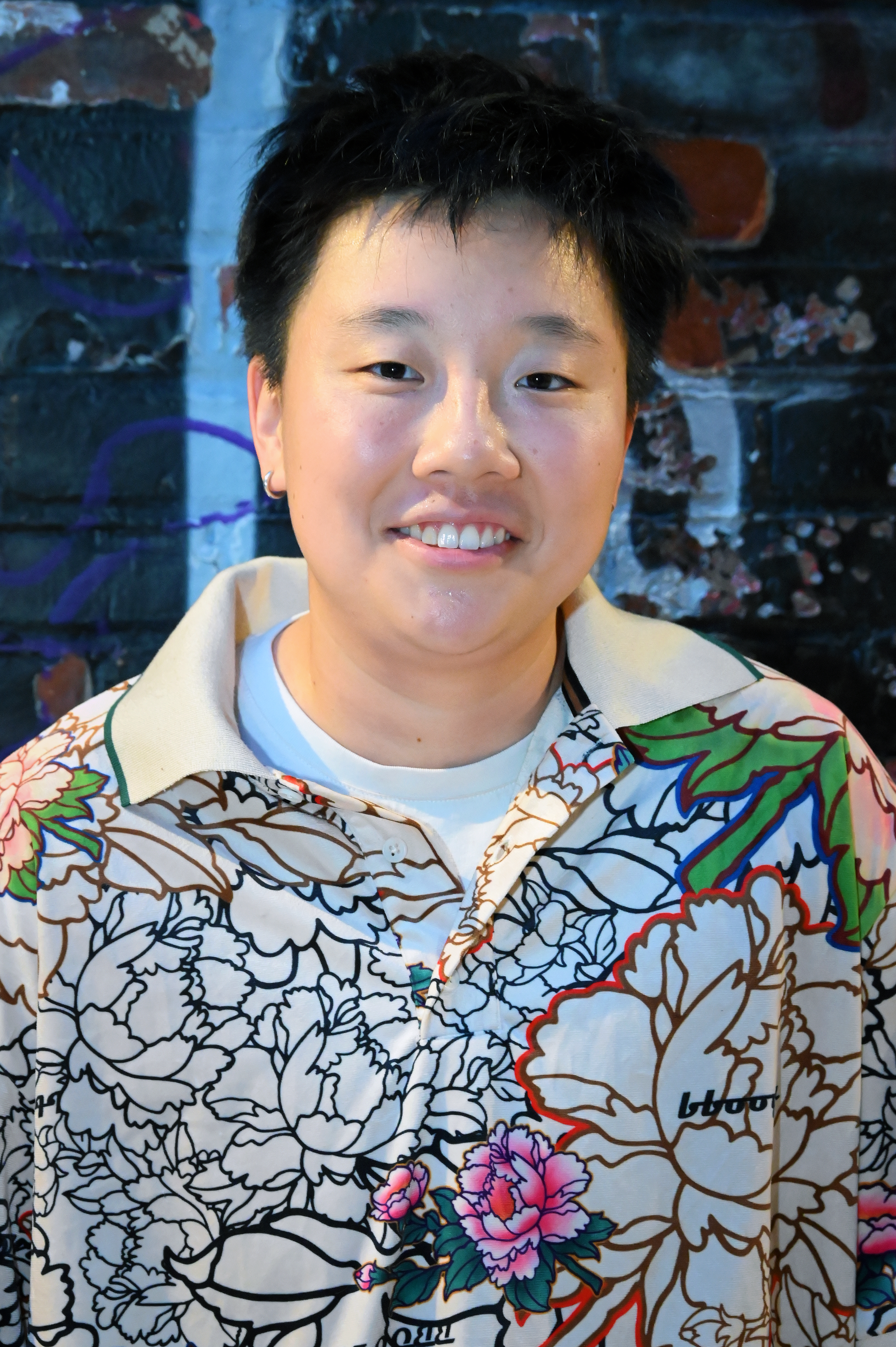
- Wu in 2025
- Born: 1997/1998 (age 28–29); Ann Arbor, Michigan, U.S.
- Education: Harvard University
- Occupations: Actor; comedian

Sabrina Wu (born 1997/1998) is an American writer, comedian, and actor. Wu's stand-up comedy has been recognized by Just for Laughs, Vulture, and Variety. They gained wider prominence as a lead actor in the Adele Lim film Joy Ride.

== Life and career ==
Wu was born and raised in Ann Arbor, Michigan. Their parents immigrated to the United States from China. Wu attended high school at Greenhills School and played on the basketball team. They first became interested in comedy at age 16 after watching Gabriel Iglesias' Hot and Fluffy special and began performing stand-up at high school talent shows.

Wu continued to perform stand-up comedy as an undergraduate student at Harvard University and was co-president of the Harvard College Stand-Up Society. They also performed with the improv group On Thin Ice and were a member of the Signet Society and the Harvard Lampoon. Wu took one semester off to intern for The Daily Show. They resided at Dunster House and graduated with a degree in psychology in 2020.

Wu's first screenwriting job was as a staff writer for the first season of the Disney+ series Doogie Kameāloha, M.D. They performed a stand-up set on The Tonight Show in 2022.

Wu played a lead character in the 2023 feature film Joy Ride, co-starring with Stephanie Hsu, Ashley Park and Sherry Cola. They also have a main role in the upcoming Lauren Ludwig comedy pilot for FX. Wu performed in a stand-up set on the Netflix comedy showcase Verified Stand-Up. In 2024 they appeared on an episode of Abbott Elementary as substitute teacher Mx. Cassidy Geoffrey.

Wu resides in Brooklyn. They identify as non-binary.

== Accolades ==
- 2022, Just for Laughs New Face of Comedy
- 2023, CinemaCon Ensemble of the Year Award (for Joy Ride)
- 2023, Variety's 10 Comics to Watch
- 2023, Vulture's 25 Comedians You Should and Will Know

== Filmography ==
=== Television ===
| Year | Title | Role | Notes |
|---|---|---|---|
| 2021 | Doogie Kameāloha, M.D. | N/A | Staff writer |
| 2022 | The Tonight Show | Themself | Stand-up set |
| 2023 | Verified Stand-Up | Themself | Netflix stand-up comedy series |
| 2024-2025 | Abbott Elementary | Cassidy Geoffrey | 2 episodes |
| 2025 | Dying for Sex | —N/a | Writer; story editor |
| 2025 | Murderbot | Pin-Lee | |

=== Film ===
| Year | Title | Role | Notes |
|---|---|---|---|
| 2023 | Joy Ride | Deadeye | |
