= Queerty =

Online magazine

- Website type: Online magazine
- Available in: English
- Headquarters: United States
- Owner: Q.Digital
- Editor: Graham Gremore
- Website: queerty.com
- Commercial: Yes
- Launched: 2005; 21 years ago
- Current status: Active

Queerty is an online magazine and newspaper covering LGBTQ-oriented entertainment and news, founded in 2005 by David Hauslaib. As of June 2015, the site had more than five million monthly unique visitors.

== History ==
Queerty was founded by David Hauslaib in 2005, with Bradford Shellhammer serving as founding editor. The site briefly shut down operations in 2011, before being sold to Q.Digital, Inc., the current owners and operators.

Newsweek called Queerty "a leading site for gay issues" in 2010.

== Queerties Awards ==
Since 2012, the site bestows the Queerties Awards (sometimes called the Queerty Awards and often simply "the Queerties") in which their readers vote for the "best of LGBTQ Media and Culture" every March.

List of Queerty Awards ceremonies, with their respective details
N°	Ceremony	Date	Host	Venue	Ref.
1st	The 2012 Queerties Awards	November 27, 2012	—N/a	—N/a	
2nd	The 2013 Queerties Awards	November 12, 2013	—N/a	—N/a	
3rd	The 2014 Queerties Awards	November 11, 2014	—N/a	—N/a	
4th	The 2015 Queerties Awards	November 20, 2015	—N/a	—N/a	
—N/a	The 2016 Queerties Awards	—N/a	—N/a	—N/a	—N/a
5th	The 2017 Queerties Awards	March, 2017	—N/a	—N/a	
6th	The 2018 Queerties Awards	February 27, 2018	Laganja Estranja	Hyde on Sunset	
7th	The 2019 Queerties Awards	February 27, 2019	Manila Luzon	WeHo	
8th	The 2020 Queerties Awards	February 28, 2020	Ongina	Liaison Restaurant and Lounge	
9th	The 2021 Queerties Awards	February 24, 2021	Heidi N Closet and Dan Tracer	Virtual	
10th	The 2022 Queerties Awards	February 24, 2022	Mo Heart and Dan Tracer	Eden Sunset	
11th	The 2023 Queerties Awards	February 28, 2023	Bianca Del Rio	Eden Sunset	
12th	The 2024 Queerties Awards	March 12, 2024	Jinkx Monsoon	The Avalon Hollywood	
13th	The 2025 Queerties Awards	March 11, 2025	Bob the Drag Queen	The Avalon Hollywood	
14th	The 2026 Queerties Awards	March 10, 2026	Trixie Mattel	The Avalon Hollywood	
15th	The 2027 Queerties Awards	To Be Announced			

The Queerties 2020

The list of winners were announced on February 28, 2020:

Music

Anthem: "Juice" – Lizzo
Indie Music Video: "Yellow Cloud" – Trixie Mattel

Film

POPcorn Flick: Rocketman
Indie Movie: Pain and Glory
Film Performance: Kate McKinnon – Bombshell

Television/Streaming

TV Series: Pose
TV Performance: Dan Levy – Schitt's Creek
Digital Series: EastSiders
Digital Performance: Van Hansis – EastSiders

Drag

Drag Royalty: Katya Zamolodchikova
Future All-Star: Nina West

Miscellaneous

Badass: Billy Porter
Favorite Follow: Mark Kanemura
Love Is Great: Lily Tomlin & Jane Wagner
Closet Door Bustdown: Lil Nas X
Comedian: Wanda Sykes
Podcast: Race Chaser
Woof Worthy Influencer: Lily Tomlin
Game Changer: Joaquín Bondoni
Memorable Memoir: Jonathan Van Ness – Over the Top
Straight Best Friend: Chris Evans
Documentary: Trixie Mattel: Moving Parts
Next Big Thing: RuPaul's Celebrity Drag Race

The Queerties 2021

The list of winners were announced on February 24, 2021:

Music

Anthem: "Rain on Me" – Lady Gaga & Ariana Grande
Indie Music Video: "Malibu" – Trixie Mattel

Film

Studio Movie: The Prom
Indie Movie: Straight Up
Performance - Film: Laverne Cox – Promising Young Woman

Television/Streaming

TV Series: Schitt's Creek
Digital Series: Putting On
Performance - TV: Sarah Paulson – Ratched
Performance - Digital Series: Tim Spencer – Ding Dong I'm Gay
Lockdown LOL: Jinkx Monsoon & BenDeLaCreme – Jinkx and DeLa Holiday Special

Drag

Drag Royalty: Jinkx Monsoon
Future All-Star: Heidi N Closet

Activism

Badass: Elliot Page
The Future Is LGBTQ: Karine Jean-Pierre – Deputy White House Press Secretary
Closet Door Bustdown: Elliot Page

Miscellaneous

Best Read: Eric Cervini – The Deviant's War
Documentary: Disclosure
Next Big Thing: Pose – Season 3
Favorite Insta Follow: Joaquín Bondoni
Favorite Tiktoker: Josh Helfgott
Podcast: The Bald and the Beautiful
Girl, Bye: Gays for Trump

Honors

Innovator: Shangela

The Queerties 2022

The list of winners were announced on February 24, 2022:

Music

Anthem: "MONTERO (Call Me By Your Name)" – Lil Nas X
Indie Music Video: "Hello Hello" – Trixie Mattel

Film

Studio Movie: Tick, Tick... Boom!
Film Performance: Lady Gaga – House of Gucci
Indie Movie: Summer of 85
Documentary: Framing Britney Spears

TV/Streaming

TV Series: Pose
TV Performance: Murray Bartlett – The White Lotus
On-Screen Romance: David & Patrick – Schitt's Creek
Digital Entertainment: Hot Homo Summer
Reality / Docuseries: RuPaul's Drag Race

Drag

Drag Royalty: Bianca Del Rio
Future All-Star: Denali

Activism

Closet Door Bustdown: Carl Nassib
Badass: Amy Schneider
Innovator: Ryan O'Connell

Miscellaneous

Podcast: Race Chaser
Standout Stand-up: Wanda Sykes
Favorite Insta-Follow: Bretman Rock
Favorite TikToker: The Old Gays
Best Read: Billy Porter – Unprotected
Next Big Thing: Hocus Pocus 2
Girl, Bye: Marjorie Taylor Greene

Honors

Groundbreaker: Gottmik
Icon: Michaela Jaé Rodriguez
