= Blue Eye Samurai =

2023 animated television series

- Promotional poster
- Genre: Action; Adventure; Historical drama; Thriller
- Created by: Amber Noizumi; Michael Green
- Voices of: Maya Erskine; George Takei; Masi Oka; Cary-Hiroyuki Tagawa; Brenda Song; Darren Barnet; Randall Park; Kenneth Branagh
- Music by: Amie Doherty
- Countries of origin: France; United States
- Original language: English
- No. of seasons: 1
- No. of episodes: 8

Production
- Executive producers: Michael Green; Amber Noizumi; Erwin Stoff
- Producers: Jane Wu; Nick Read; Nicholas Cofrancesco; Haven Alexander; Kevin Hart
- Editors: Yuka Shirasuna; Brad Lee Zimmerman
- Running time: 35–62 minutes
- Production companies: Blue Spirit; Netflix Animation Studios; J.A. Green Construction Corp.; 3 Arts Entertainment

Original release
- Network: Netflix
- Release: November 3, 2023 – present

Blue Eye Samurai is an adult animated historical action television series created and written by wife-and-husband team Amber Noizumi and Michael Green, with supervising director and series producer Jane Wu. It was animated and co-produced by French studio Blue Spirit. The first season premiered on Netflix on November 3, 2023. In December 2023, the series was renewed for a second season, which is set to premiere on January 19, 2027. In August 2026, the series was renewed for a third and final season.

== Premise ==
During Japan's Edo period, a half-white half-Japanese onna-musha named Mizu seeks vengeance against four white men, one of whom is her father, who illegally remained in Japan during the closing of its borders by the Tokugawa shogunate.

== Voice cast and characters ==
=== Main ===
- Maya Erskine as Mizu, a mixed-race blue-eyed bushi. Her experiences of discrimination as a mixed-race Japanese child have left her cold, bitter, and vengeful. Forced by her adoptive mother to disguise herself as a boy so as not to be found, she chooses to maintain her disguise into adulthood to pursue her path of revenge more freely.
- George Takei as Seki, Princess Akemi's tutor in the Tokunobu Clan's household. He sympathizes with Akemi's situation and later takes steps to ensure her freedom.
- Masi Oka as Ringo, an optimistic, handless cook who idolizes Mizu. Despite Mizu initially not wanting a companion, she later tolerates Ringo. He proves surprisingly helpful and loyal to Mizu.
- Cary-Hiroyuki Tagawa as Master Eiji, a blind swordsmith who raised Mizu. He was the first person to show Mizu kindness; as a result, Mizu respects him, referring to him as "Swordfather".
- Brenda Song as Princess Tokunobu Akemi, the pampered but strong-willed daughter of a nouveau riche lord. She harbors feelings for Taigen and, resentful of her father's control, desires a life of independence.
- Darren Barnet as Taigen, a promising but arrogant swordsman of humble origins. He is in love with Princess Akemi and harbors a strong resentment towards Mizu, which has lasted since their childhoods. He later seeks revenge after being humiliated in a duel, which cuts off his engagement with Akemi.
- Randall Park as Heiji Shindo, Fowler's nominal jailor and accomplice
- Kenneth Branagh as Abijah Fowler, an Irish smuggler and arms dealer who is allied with the Shogun, in secret defiance of Japan's Sakoku closed-door policies. He plans to overthrow the current Shogun and replace him with a leader who will open Japan to outside influence.

=== Supporting ===
- Stephanie Hsu as Ise, a prostitute
- Ming-Na Wen as Madame Kaji, a cunning and savvy madam
- Harry Shum Jr. as Takayoshi, the Shogun's second son
- Mark Dacascos as Bloodsoaked Chiaki, an assassin and the leader of the Four Fangs
- Orli Mariko Green as Young Mizu
- Judah Green as Young Taigen
- Patrick Gallagher as Lord Tokunobu Daichi, Akemi's father
- Ann Harada as Mama, Mizu's unnamed adoptive mother. Although Mizu initially believed she was her biological mother, it is later revealed she was merely her maid who was paid to care for her
- Byron Mann as Mikio, a disgraced samurai formerly married to Mizu

Dacascos, Gallagher, and series co-creator Amber Noizumi also voice additional minor characters. Other supporting voices are provided by Gedde Watanabe, Eric Bauza, Clyde Kusatsu, Keone Young, Brittany Ishibashi, Holly Chou, Marcus Choi, Matthew Yang King, Jane Wu, West Liang, Alain Uy, Takaaki Hirakawa, Sherry Cola, and Christine Ko.

== Episodes ==
No. overall	No. in season	Title	Directed by	Written by	Runtime	Original release date
1	1	"Hammerscale"	Jane Wu	Amber Noizumi & Michael Green	62 min	3 November 2023
In a soba (noodle) shop, Mizu encounters a "flesh-trader" (a purveyor of women to brothels) with a Western pistol. Mizu forces him to reveal the name of the weapons dealer, Heiji Shindo. Ringo, the kitchen attendant, follows Mizu and implores to be taken as an apprentice. Princess Akemi, the only daughter of the Daimyo of Kyoto, Lord Tokunobu Daichi, convinces her father to approve of her marriage to Taigen, a young and accomplished samurai. Mizu seeks a meeting with the master of the Shindo Dojo to find out the location of his brother, Heiji Shindo. When the request is denied it leads to conflict; Mizu defeats the students easily. Taigen, who tormented Mizu as a child, is now the dojo's prized champion, but when Mizu defeats him, the master reveals the location of his brother. In a flashback as a child, Mizu encounters Master Eiji, a blind swordsmith; they recover a glowing blue metallic meteorite. She becomes his apprentice and learns swordsmithing and swordcraft. In the present, at the behest of white foreigner Abijah Fowler, Heiji Shindo dispatches assassins the "Four Fangs" to kill Mizu. Ringo discovers that Mizu is a woman.
2	2	"An Unexpected Element"	Ryan O'Loughlin	Michael Green & Amber Noizumi	48 min	3 November 2023
Reluctantly allowing Ringo to join her, Mizu arrives at a coastal town, seeking to hire a boat to reach Shindo's island fortress. Shindo and Fowler plot a "surprise" for the Shogun in Edo. Taigen pursues Mizu to regain his honor. Because of Taigen's defeat, Daichi plans to marry Akemi off to the Shogun's widowed second son and will take her to Edo in five days, despite her objections. She decides to flee in search of Taigen, although Daichi's retainer Seki catches her and, unable to stop her, joins her instead. While Ringo participates in the town Hadaka Matsuri festivities, Mizu trains on the cliffs above. She remembers an assassin named "Blood-soaked Chiaki", who tricked her and "Swordfather" into forging him a sword, which broke near the tip during the forging process due to an injury Mizu sustained during a practice duel with Chiaki. The "Four Fangs" attack. Their leader is Chiaki, still using the broken blade. Mizu battles the "Four Fangs" and kills them, but is heavily injured in the process. Taigen, having tracked Mizu down reveals himself and challenges her, to which she complies but soon collapses due to blood loss.
3	3	"A Fixed Number of Paths"	Earl A. Hibbert; Alan Wan	Michael Green & Amber Noizumi	45 min	3 November 2023
Taigen and Ringo take Mizu to shelter at a nearby shrine. Mizu agrees to duel Taigen once she is recovered. A man with a club delivers an invitation to a "tea ceremony" with Heiji. Mizu accepts and everybody travels to the meeting. Heiji gives Mizu three options: be paid off to renounce her vendetta, be smuggled into Heiji's castle in sake barrels to kill Fowler, or refuse and be killed by archers hiding nearby. Mizu cuts off his arm. Taigen, Mizu, and Ringo flee while being bombarded by arrows. Afterwards, Mizu knocks Taigen unconscious and leaves him with Chiaki's broken blade and a note promising to attend their duel at a later time. Taigen is subsequently kidnapped and taken to Heiji's castle. Brigands ambush Seki and Akemi, who lose their money and transport. They hire a cart using the last of Akemi's jewelry, but Akemi discovers that they are traveling in the wrong direction. Seki reveals he has enough money to hire a horse back to the palace, and implores Akemi to give up the search for Taigen and accept the marriage which he brought before Daichi. Akemi rejects the offer and tricks a flesh trader into transporting her instead.
4	4	"Peculiarities"	Ryan O'Loughlin	Michael Green & Amber Noizumi	47 min	3 November 2023
Mizu seeks out Madame Kaji's brothel to follow up on what Heiji Shindo revealed about how prostitutes enter Fowler's castle. Kaji promises to give her the information if Mizu agrees to mercy kill Kinuyo, a deaf-mute girl who was in Kaji's care before being forcibly taken by the "Thousand Claws" mob boss Hamata. After convincing Kinuyo to believe Mizu will protect her, Mizu carries out her task and leaves the scene making Kinuyo's death look like an accident. However, on her way out a boy sees her; Hamata arrives at Kaji's brothel with his fighters and orders them to kill everyone. After realizing Akemi has run off, Daichi sends his men after her. Akemi ends up in the same town as Mizu and sees her with Taigen's scarf, entering the brothel. Akemi persuades the purveyor to trade her there. To prove her competence when tasked by Kaji with pleasuring a veteran customer with erectile difficulties, she tactfully uses his proficiency in poetry to stimulate and bring him to climax. While being applauded for her talent, she volunteers to serve Mizu in an attempt to drug her. At the castle fortress, Shindo tortures Taigen for information about Mizu.
5	5	"The Tale of the Ronin and the Bride"	Michael Green	Amber Noizumi	46 min	3 November 2023
Faced with the threat of Hamata's men, Mizu gathers the women of the brothel in the cellar and tasks Ringo with guarding them. She then starts taking out the "Thousand Claws" individually, until one wounds Mizu, resulting in her losing strength. In a flashback, Mizu is wounded by gangsters, and is later saved by her presumed-dead mother, who goes on to arrange a marriage between Mizu and disgraced samurai Mikio. Gradually, Mizu begins developing a genuine connection with Mikio, but when a sparring match between the two reveals her violent side, he calls her a monster. He fails to help her when soldiers arrive to collect the bounty on her head. Feeling betrayed, she battles the group and kills them. Mikio and Mizu's mother fight over who betrayed Mizu. Mikio stabs Mizu's mother to death. Mizu kills Mikio and leaves. In the present, Mizu is pinned down but summons back her strength, turns her sword into a makeshift naginata, and kills Hamata's men. The men sent by Daichi arrive to take Akemi back home and though she pleads with Mizu to help her, Mizu does not intervene. Ringo, angered over Mizu's decision, ends his apprenticeship. Akemi is later at the Shogun's palace with her teeth blackened to mark her status as a bride.
6	6	"All Evil Dreams and Angry Words"	Earl A. Hibbert; Sunny Sun	Amber Noizumi & Michael Green	35 min	3 November 2023
Mizu follows the instructions relayed by Kaji, finding the underground passageway to the castle littered with the skeletons of women and infants. While trying to unlock the door to exit the tunnel, she accidentally triggers a water trap. She escapes drowning, but loses most of her gear. Her covert entrance is blown when a soldier sounds the alarm, interrupting Heiji and Fowler's meeting at the upper level with two of the Shogun's advisers as they conspire to kill the Shogun and his family to take power by force using guns in Fowler's possession. Mizu proceeds upwards through the palace, sustaining injury from traps and guards. Eventually, she reaches a dungeon area and fights her way through released prisoners before noticing the cell holding a badly injured Taigen. Mizu carries him with her till she comes across the man carrying a club. Mizu defeats him with an explosive that also breaches the outer castle wall. She then climbs to the top of the outer wall while carrying Taigen, and then confronts Fowler. He shoots at them, injuring Mizu and breaking her sword. While Fowler is trying to kill Taigen, Mizu grabs Taigen and jumps into the freezing water below.
7	7	"Nothing Broken"	Alan Taylor	Yana Bille-Chung	45 min	3 November 2023
Ringo saves Mizu and Taigen, bringing their unconscious bodies to "Swordfather's" hut. While recovering, Mizu eventually reveals to Taigen that Akemi will marry the Shogun's son, and Fowler's impending attack on the Shogunate. Taigen rejects Mizu's broken blade and leaves for Edo to save Akemi and warn the Shogun, vowing to kill Mizu when he returns. After multiple failed attempts and mending ties with Ringo, Mizu recreates the metallurgy of her sword's steel but refrains from reforging it until she has slain Fowler. Mizu and Ringo leave for Edo to save Akemi and kill Fowler. Akemi endures the machinations of her cruel mother-in-law. She confronts her husband, discovering him to be gentle, despite his reputation (the result of propaganda), and also insecure and pliable due to his severe stammer. She strikes an understanding with him which leads to the consummation of their marriage. She uses her newly gained wealth to hire Kaji's prostitutes as her new attendants. One of these, Ise, informs her of Fowler's plans. They relay this to Daichi, who kills Ise, revealing himself to be involved in the conspiracy. He then confines Akemi in a basement cell.
8	8	"The Great Fire of 1657"	Jane Wu	Michael Green & Amber Noizumi	49 min	3 November 2023
Mizu asks Ringo to wait by the sewers while she saves Akemi and sends her his way. Taigen finds Ringo and they decide to storm the front gate to warn the Shogun about the impending attack, which shortly ensues as Fowler's army breaks through the castle defenses. Seki saves Akemi from her cell, locking Daichi in her place, but they are outnumbered by soldiers until Mizu arrives. Heiji opens the final gate from the inside, giving Fowler access to the Shogun and his family. Fowler kills the Shogun, but the Shogun's sons and wife escape after Mizu crashes in, leaving Taigen to kill Heiji. Mizu subdues Fowler after starting a fire while attempting to stop him from fleeing, which spreads throughout Edo. (Note: This coincides with the historical Great Fire of Meireki.) Fowler tells Mizu that they will have to travel to London to find the remaining two white men, Skeffington and Routely, and that the woman she thought to be her mother was actually a maid paid to raise her. Seki and Akemi shut the castle's front gate, preventing Fowler's men from escaping the fire but Seki is fatally shot. Taigen finds Akemi and offers to run away with her, but she declines, choosing to remain in Edo with the Shogun's surviving family and Daichi. Ringo returns to "Swordfather", convinced that Mizu perished in the fire. Mizu leaves on a ship for London with Fowler as her captive.

== Production ==
In October 2020, it was reported that Netflix had greenlit production of the series, with creators Green and Noizumi acting as writers, executive producers and showrunners. The series features 2D/3D-hybrid animation produced by French studio Blue Spirit. They wanted it to "look like a moving painting" with character design drawn from bunraku puppets. Inspiration was taken from the character Zatoichi, the "Man with No Name", and the works of Akira Kurosawa. The creators have stated their aim to make three or four seasons, and possibly a spinoff featuring Ringo. The first seven episodes have an aspect ratio of 16:9, with the eighth episode changing to 2.35:1.

On December 11, 2023, the series was renewed for a second season. Fight choreography is brought to life by using motion references from live-action stunt performers. Producer Jane Wu stated that the action scenes will be staged much like those in live-action films. John Aoshima is confirmed to direct at least one episode in the second season. The creators have outlined a three-season story arc to finish the series.

On August 20, 2026, the series was renewed for a third and final season.

== Release ==
The first episode was released as a "sneak peek" on Netflix's YouTube channel on November 1, 2023. The first season, consisting of eight episodes, premiered on Netflix on November 3, 2023. The second season, consisting of six episodes, is set to premiere in January 2027.

Netflix released a special version of the sixth episode on its YouTube channel on November 14, 2023, featuring a largely black-and-white palette and an altered soundtrack.

The second season, set to consist of six episodes, was originally scheduled to premiere in 2026 but was delayed to January 19, 2027.

== Reception ==
Review aggregator Rotten Tomatoes reported a 97% critic rating with an average rating of 8.30 out of 10 based on 29 reviews. The website's critics' consensus says, "Visually dazzling while paying deft attention to character, Blue Eye Samurai is a masterfully rendered animated adventure." Metacritic, which uses a weighted average, assigned a score of 88 out of 100 based on 6 critics, indicating "universal acclaim".

Renowned video game designer, Hideo Kojima, praised Blue Eye Samurai as the "best anime of the year", describing it as "a visual work that transcends the common sense of animation".

== Awards and nominations ==
Year	Award	Category	Nominee(s)	Result	Ref.
2024	American Cinema Editors Awards	Best Edited Animated Series	Yuka Shirasuna (for "The Tale of the Ronin and the Bride")	Won	
2024	Annie Awards	Best Mature Audience Animated Television/Broadcast Production	"Hammerscale"	Won	
2024	Annie Awards	Outstanding Achievement for Animated Effects in an Animated Television/Broadcast Production	Thomas Decaens, Karl Burtin, and Laurent Bretonniere (for "All Evil Dreams and Angry Words")	Won	
2024	Annie Awards	Outstanding Achievement for Character Animation in an Animated Television / Broadcast Production	Alex Bard	Won	
2024	Annie Awards	Outstanding Achievement for Editorial in an Animated Television / Broadcast Production	Yuka Shirasuna (for "The Tale of the Ronin and the Bride")	Won	
2024	Annie Awards	Outstanding Achievement for Production Design in an Animated Television / Broadcast Production	Jason Scheier (for "Hammerscale")	Nominated	
2024	Annie Awards	Outstanding Achievement for Production Design in an Animated Television / Broadcast Production	Toby Wilson, James Wilson, and Emil Mitev (for "The Great Fire of 1657")	Won	
2024	Annie Awards	Outstanding Achievement for Writing in an Animated Television / Broadcast Production	Amber Noizumi (for "The Tale of the Ronin and the Bride")	Won	
2024	Astra TV Awards	Best Anime Series	Blue Eye Samurai	Nominated	
2024	Peabody Awards	Entertainment	Blue Eye Samurai	Nominated	
2024	Primetime Creative Arts Emmy Awards	Outstanding Animated Program	Michael Green, Amber Noizumi, Erwin Stoff, Jane Wu, Nick Read and Michael Greenholt (for "The Tale of the Ronin and the Bride")	Won	
2024	Primetime Creative Arts Emmy Awards	Outstanding Individual Achievement in Animation	Brian Kesinger (for Character Design) (for "Nothing Broken")	Won	
2024	Primetime Creative Arts Emmy Awards	Outstanding Individual Achievement in Animation	Toby Wilson (for Production Design) (for "The Great Fire Of 1657")	Won	
2024	Primetime Creative Arts Emmy Awards	Outstanding Individual Achievement in Animation	Ryan O'Loughlin (for Storyboard) (for "Hammerscale")	Won	
2024	Primetime Creative Arts Emmy Awards	Outstanding Sound Editing for a Comedy or Drama Series (Half-Hour) and Animation	Myron Nettinga, Paulette Lifton, Sam Hayward, Jared Dwyer, Andrew Miller, Johanna Turner, Justin Helle, Iko Kagasoff, Stefan Fraticelli, Jason Charbonneau (for "All Evil Dreams and Angry Words")	Nominated	
2025	Artios Awards	Outstanding Achievement in Casting – Animated Program for Television	Margery Simkin, Orly Sitowitz, Elizabeth Vitale, Jasmine Gutierrez	Won	
