= SMK (P) Sri Aman =

Sri Aman Girls' Secondary School
- SMK (P) Sri Aman
- Petaling Jaya, Selangor; Malaysia

Information
- Type: Public All-girls
- Motto: Berusaha Ke Medan Jaya
- Established: 9 August 1971
- Principal: Suhafna A Rahman
- Grades: Form 1 – Form 5
- Language: Malay English
- Colours: Violet and yellow
- Houses: Ruby; Sapphire; Emerald; Topaz

Sekolah Menengah Kebangsaan (Perempuan) Sri Aman or also known as SMK (P) Sri Aman, is a Malaysian girls' secondary school. It was recently awarded the title Cluster School of Excellence by the Malaysian Ministry of Education. Recently, the school was announced as one of the top 100 schools in Malaysia by the Malaysian Ministry of Education, thus receiving the title 'High Performance School'.

== History ==
In the early 1970s, Section 14 was developing rapidly as a housing estate. Thus, as the population increased, the number of children attending secondary was also increasing. At the time, secondary school girls had to attend Sekolah Menengah (P) Taman Petaling which was located quite a distance away from Section 14. Due to the need that arose, the government decided to open up a secondary school for the girls in Section 14.

At the beginning, the school was known as Sekolah Menengah Jenis Kebangsaan (Inggeris) Section 14. It was officially opened on 9 August 1971. 416 students were transferred to this school from Sekolah Menengah (P) Taman Petaling. Not only that, 13 teachers from the same school were also brought in. Another teacher was transferred from Sekolah Menengah Jalan Cheras, Kuala Lumpur.

Form 3 and Form 5 students were not transferred at the time because it was already the third term of the academic year for L.C.E and H.S.C of 1971.

The first principal, Cik Jeanette Lim Leong Huan, played the main role in the identity of the school by creating the school badge with the enchanted phrase "Menuju ke Medan Jaya" and later was transformed to "Berusaha ke Medan Jaya". She had also decided to choose violet and yellow as the colours of the school.

== Facilities ==
The school has squash courts and tennis courts, a basketball court and a handball court a field and school hall. There is a smaller hall available for cheer and aerobics practices. The school has an orchestra room, a choir room and also an 'Anklung' room for musically inclined co-curriculum activities.

== School Badge ==
The school badge was designed by Datin Sharon Martha Augustin, an art teacher at the school in 1971.

Motto is 'Berusaha Ke Medan Jaya' (Efforts Towards Success). Colours yellow and violet are used. Branches symbolise harmony and peace. Torch and book symbolise students who are willing to advance towards success in academic and co-curriculum at all times. Hoops symbolise strength and unity.

== School Principals ==
(1 August 1971) to (31 December 1972)
Jeanette Lim Leong Huan

(1 January 1973) to (28 February 1977)
Chew Pek Lim Wong

(1 March 1977) to (15 September 1984)
Arpah Mohammad

(16 September 1984) to (30 October 1990)
Zahirah Zainuddin

(1 November 1990) to (15 November 1995)
Hazimah Abd. Rahman

(16 November 1995) to (30 April 2002)
Maharani Mohd. Jais

(1 May 2002) to (6 August 2004)
Fitriah Yusof

(1 October 2004) to (13 October 2010)
Alainal Hasani Md. Noor

(14 October 2010) to (7 March 2016)
Noorul-Aini Ambak

(8 March 2016) to (31 January 2020)
Misliah Kulop

(24 February 2020) to (30 September 2022)
Salwani Muhammad Zain

(5 October 2022) to until now
Suhafna A Rahman

== Notable alumni ==
- Norashikin Onn, Malaysia's first female pilot
- Wani Kayrie, a Malaysian singer, actor, and influencer
- Adele Lim, the screenwriter of Crazy Rich Asians & Raya and the Last Dragon
