= Adele Lim =

Malaysian screenwriter and director

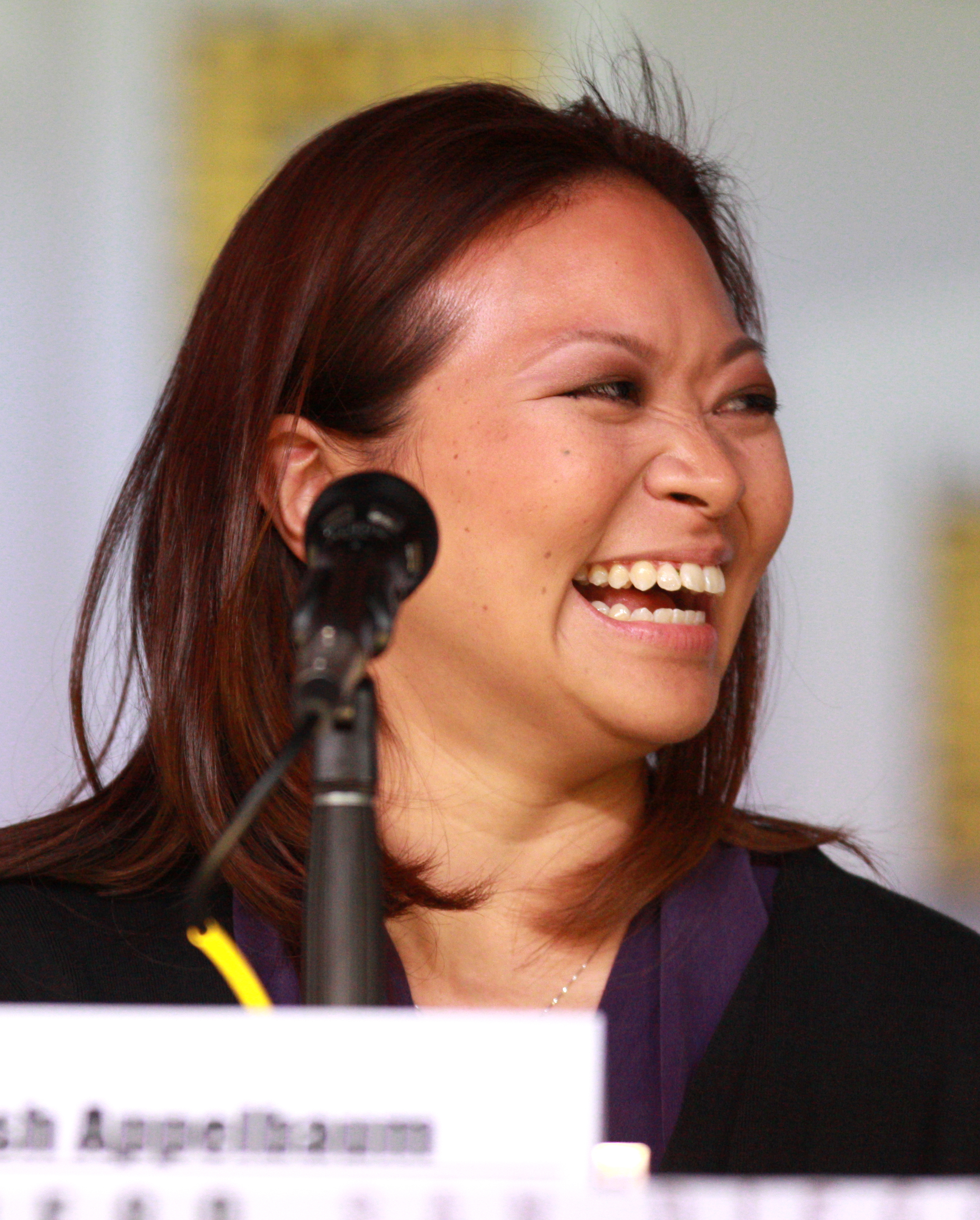
- Lim at the 2013 San Diego Comic-Con
- Born: Petaling Jaya, Selangor, Malaysia
- Education: Emerson College
- Occupations: Screenwriter; producer
- Known for: Crazy Rich Asians; Raya and the Last Dragon; Joy Ride

Adele Lim is a Malaysian screenwriter, producer, and director. After an early career in television, she achieved wider recognition for co-writing Crazy Rich Asians (2018), which was notably the first film by a major Hollywood studio to feature a majority cast of Asian descent in a modern setting since 1993's The Joy Luck Club.

Lim's subsequent films were the animated fantasy Raya and the Last Dragon (2021) and her directorial debut, the buddy comedy Joy Ride (2023).

== Early life ==
Lim was born in Malaysia and is of Malaysian Chinese descent. She attended Malaysia's Sri Aman Girls School in Petaling Jaya, in Petaling District, in the state of Selangor. She started writing as a teenager and undergraduate in the lifestyle section of a local daily. She graduated from Emerson College in Boston with a degree in TV/film in 1996 and currently resides in Los Angeles, California.

== Career ==
Lim started her career as a script coordinator for Xena: Warrior Princess, getting the job despite her resume being, as she described, "nonexistent". She has written for TV series such as One Tree Hill, Life Unexpected, Reign, Star-Crossed, Private Practice and Lethal Weapon.

In 2018, Lim was the co-screenwriter for the 2018 movie Crazy Rich Asians. Director Jon M. Chu asked her to rewrite the existing screenplay. In her rewrite she notably added the climactic scene of mahjong between Constance Wu and Michelle Yeoh's characters. Lim left writing on the sequel, following reports that she was offered significantly less pay (around $110,000) than her male co-writer Peter Chiarelli ($800,000 to $1 million). Warner Brothers defended the offer, citing the difference in experience between the two.

Disney recruited Lim to develop the animated feature film Raya and the Last Dragon, which released in 2021. She served as screenwriter alongside Qui Nguyen.

In her feature directorial debut, Lim directed and produced comedy film Joy Ride, starring Ashley Park, Sherry Cola, Stephanie Hsu, and Sabrina Wu. The movie premiered at SXSW in March 2023.

She has given support to young writers as mentor and speaker for the Coalition of Asian Pacifics in Entertainment (CAPE).

In 2024, Variety reported that she signed on to direct The Princess Diaries 3 with Anne Hathaway reprising her role.

Following years of development, Lim returned to the Crazy Rich Asians franchise as the showrunner of the revamped sequel television series for HBO.

== Filmography ==
Film

Year	Title	Director	Writer	Producer
2018	Crazy Rich Asians	No	Yes	No
2021	Raya and the Last Dragon	No	Yes	No
2023	Joy Ride	Yes	Story	Yes

Television

Year	Title	Writer	Producer	Notes
2001–2002	Digimon: Digital Monsters	Yes	No	Seasons 2–4; 20 episodes (English dub)
2002	John Doe	Yes	No	Episode "Mind Games"
2003–2005	Las Vegas	Yes	No	3 episodes; Also story editor and executive story editor
2006	Pepper Dennis	Yes	Co-producer	Wrote 2 episodes
2006–2008	One Tree Hill	Yes	Co-producer	Wrote 2 episodes
2008–2009	Life on Mars	Yes	Supervising	Wrote 3 episodes
2010	Life Unexpected	No	Yes	
2011–2012	Private Practice	Yes	Co-Executive	Wrote 2 episodes
2012	Missing	Yes	Consulting	Wrote episode "The Three Bears"
2014	Star-Crossed	Yes	Executive	Wrote 2 episodes
2014–2015	Reign	Yes	Co-Executive	Wrote 3 episodes
2016–2017	Lethal Weapon	Yes	Co-Executive	Wrote 2 episodes
2018	Dynasty	Yes	No	Episode "A Well-Dressed Tarantula"

Script Coordinator

- Xena: Warrior Princess (2000) (Episode "Punch Lines")
- State of Grace (2001)
