= Reef Break =

2019 French-American crime drama television series

- Genre: Crime; Drama
- Created by: Ken Sanzel
- Starring: Poppy Montgomery; Ray Stevenson; Desmond Chiam; Melissa Bonne; Tamala Shelton
- Composer: Michael Yezerski
- Countries of origin: United States; France
- Original language: English
- No. of seasons: 1
- No. of episodes: 13

Production
- Executive producers: Steve Pearlman; Ruthanne Secunda; Poppy Montgomery; Mark Rosner
- Producers: Stuart Wood; Guy J. Louthan; Alex Zakrzewski (pilot only)
- Cinematography: Bruce Young; Geoffrey Hall; Tony Mirza
- Editors: Ben Joss; James Manche; Peter Carrodus; Mandy Jacobs; Ahmad Halimi; Andrew Macneil; Charlie Werdlih; Mark Warner
- Camera setup: Multi-camera
- Running time: 41–43 minutes
- Production companies: Wild Poppy Entertainment; ABC Studios International

Original release
- Network: ABC (United States); M6 (France)
- Release: June 20 – September 13, 2019

Reef Break is a French-American crime drama television series. ABC Studios International produced the television series for French broadcaster M6, as well as for ABC. The series premiered on June 20, 2019, on ABC in the United States.

On December 13, 2019, ABC cancelled the series after one season.

== Cast ==
- Poppy Montgomery as Cat Chambers, a professional surfer and former associate of the Shorepound criminal syndicate, with whom she worked as a smuggler, money launderer, hustler, con artist, and burglar. Now retired, she returns to Reef Island to take up work as a fixer for the island's government.
- Ray Stevenson as Jake Elliot, an aging federal agent stationed on Reef Island, where his exploits are considered legend. Years earlier, he infiltrated Shorepound and met Cat, whom he wound up marrying; he then got her to turn on her partners and broke up the syndicate. Although he and his wife are now separated, he still helps her out from time to time.
- Desmond Chiam as Det. Wyatt Cole, a newly promoted detective in the Reef Island police department who pairs up with Cat after they share a one-night stand. He does not trust her at first, but gradually comes to realize that she genuinely wants to turn over a new leaf.
- Melissa Bonne as Ana Dumont, Wyatt's half-sister and the deputy governor of Reef Island, who hires Cat to assist the police and occasionally handle problems that the governor's office wants to keep out of the spotlight.
- Tamala Shelton as Petra Torrance, a surfer and thief who hates Cat for her part in the death of her father Mike.
- Jacek Koman as General Kivani
- Joey Vieira as Detective Tolan
- Laura Gordon as Sergeant Kirsty Ellis
- Heather Mitchell as Maeve Devlin
- Dustin Clare as Richard Stuyler
- Ian Bliss as Jones
- Toby Schmitz as Leo Murphy
- Anthony Brandon Wong as Dr. Griffin

== Production ==
The series was announced on May 2, 2018. ABC Studios International is producing the television series for French broadcaster M6. On August 23, 2018, it was announced that ABC had picked up the series for its own 2019 summer schedule. The first season would consist of 13 episodes. On April 10, 2019, it was announced that the series would premiere on ABC in the United States on June 20, 2019.

Reef Break was filmed on the Gold Coast, Queensland, Australia.

== Episodes ==
No.	Title	Directed by	Written by	Original release date	U.S. viewers (millions)
1	"Pilot"	Alex Zakrzewski	Ken Sanzel	June 20, 2019	2.84
In Nimitz Bay, a community on the fictional U.S. territory of Reef Island, retired grifter Cat Chambers returns to testify against the man who tried to kill her five years earlier. Businessman Carter Eastland then hires her to help rescue his daughter Tori, who is being held for a ransom of $6 million, with a local cop, Det. Cole, as her backup. Cole sidelines her, so Cat goes to her estranged husband Jake, who offers to help but also serves her divorce papers. Cole arrests her for violating a crime scene, but releases her when the kidnappers demand that she deliver the ransom in person. However, Cat disobeys instructions and rescues Tori herself, having switched out the ransom money with weights. Cat correctly deduces that Tori faked her kidnapping and saves her from being murdered by her disgruntled accomplice, who she manages to kill when Jake distracts him. Carter gives her use of Tori's beach house in return for her silence, and Cat tries to reconnect with Petra, the daughter of a man she killed during her criminal career. Cat accepts an offer from the deputy governor, Ana, to work as a fixer for the governor's office.
2	"Lost and Found"	Shawn Seet	Robert Port	June 27, 2019	1.98
Ana sends Cat after Dax Melvoy, a lawyer with an incriminating video of the governor who has been taken hostage; she has to destroy the video before it can be distributed. Melvoy is rescued, and identifies his abductors as a gang of pirates the police have hunted for seven years. Wyatt forces Doc Yulo, a local drug kingpin, to return a watch that Cat stole for him while they were married. Cat gets Petra's minibike out of impound and trades it to Otter, the local fence and Petra's adopted father, for a map that reveals a secret reef where the pirates are hiding, then steals a boat with Wyatt to find them alone. However, when Wyatt reveals he had police tailing them, Cat kicks him off the boat. Unbeknownst to her, Richard Stuyler, Carter's security chief, is also following, having forced Otter to reveal Cat's plan. The pirates' leader, Raven, lets Cat watch the video and helps her distract Stuyler while alerting Wyatt to their location, forcing him and his men to retreat. Cat sells the video for an inflated price to the governor. Jake tells Cat that she has inspired him to try to be a better man. Cat tells him to keep the watch so she will always have a reason to see him.
3	"Buried Things"	Kieran Darcy-Smith	Mark Rosner	July 11, 2019	2.28
Petra agrees to fence some stolen gold, but her contact is killed during the handoff. Doug O'Casey, the former head of Shorepound, asks for a transfer to Oregon so he can protect his nephew Jasper. Cat goes to her mentor Maeve Devlin for help, but she declines; Cat then plants a tracker on her car. That night, she barely survives an attempt on her life. Suspecting that the cops handling the case, Hines and Inoue, might be dirty, Cat turns to Jake for assistance. By tailing Maeve, they find Sonny Turner, who stole $30 million worth of gold a decade earlier and used part of it to turn his life around while hiding the rest in the jungle. Hines and Inoue grab Petra and her friends and take them to find the gold. Cat persuades Sonny to lead her to the stash with Wyatt and Jake in close pursuit. Hines and Inoue are shot, and Petra and the others are cleared of murder. Even though turning him in would revitalize his career, Jake cuts Sonny loose. Petra puts Cat in touch with Jasper, and she learns that Doug has been lying to her about needing the transfer. Doug smugly infers that he has something in the works, something that only she can figure out.
4	"Welcome to the Jungle"	Sian Davies	Ken Sanzel	July 18, 2019	1.85
During a secret meeting with the Sawyer drug syndicate to discuss an incursion of Thai drug traffickers on the island, Cat and Ana are forced to flee when gunmen abduct Dylan Sawyer; they discover that Dylan's son Beau has betrayed him so he can take over and convert his marijuana operation into a massive drug processing facility. While investigating the same case, Wyatt and Jake learn that a drug cook known as the "Chemist" is heading the Thai gang and force the governor to reveal Ana's whereabouts. With no other choice, they go after them with assistance from Stuyler and Eastland's men. Cat and Ana separate and Ana is caught, while Cat is able to intercept the Chemist and take him hostage; as Ana speaks Thai, she is able to convince the traffickers to leave, while both Beau and the Chemist are arrested. Stuyler tells Wyatt he will be expected to provide a favor if he wants any further assistance. Cat recognizes that Jake still has feelings for her, unaware that he and Ana are in a secret relationship. That evening, when Wyatt comes to stay over, Cat finds an incriminating message from Stuyler on his phone.
5	"The Green Tide"	Peter Andrikidis	Niceole R. Levy	July 25, 2019	1.91
A refinery owned by Carter Eastland explodes due to sabotage and a bomb was left to finish it off. After Cat disabled the bomb, the gang suspect some environmental fanatics called Green Tide to be the culprits, two of which, Stuyler and Jakinda, happen to be there and Cat suspects Carter himself was behind the explosion the whole time. While Cole went to the Green Tide base of operations Cat interrogates Carter, however there seems to be more than meets the eye going on: Green Tide its seems was innocent. Cat and Jake try to uncover Carter's secrets, meanwhile Carter himself was on the receiving end of an assassination attempt that destroyed his car. Cat pays a visit to Jakinda's address and finds she has a passport and a second I.D., but is caught by Jakinda herself, sparking a fight between the two woman, though Jakinda escaped. The next day Cat delivered the second I.D. to Cole, and "Jakinda" is actually Elidi Carras who worked as a bomb-thrower for Carter, and that she has a grudge against Carter for getting her brother Nico killed. She personally waltzes into Carter's building wearing a vest with a bomb, threatening to blow up herself and take Carter with her, but is thwarted by Cat, Cole and Jake.
6	"The Two O'Clock Flight"	Peter Andrikidis	Robert Port	August 1, 2019	1.97
Cat is haunted by what happened in the last episode, but it is far from over as Doug informs her that more assassins are coming via Stuyler by plane, so Cat and Jake head to the airport meet these killers. The first assassin off the plane though, immediately shoots at Jake and all three fortify themselves in the plane and hold the passengers and crew hostage, although their real intent was succeed where Elidi Carras failed. Jake play along with the assassins' demands by sending a disguised Cat onboard their plane, and she managed to get at least three hostages off before getting down to business. Meanwhile Cole goes looking for Stuyler, who seems to have flown the coup. He does however find out where Stuyler is headed to, but upon arrival finds Stuyler has been killed. Cat and the lead assassin Mr Pink raise the steaks in their little "negotiation", until one passenger exposes her, but Jake and a swat storm into the DC-3. Even so Pink takes Cat hostage, only to be sniped by Cole. Though Ana was not pleased at Cat's attempt at being substitute, she is satisfied with the outcome, but Cat believes Doug is up to something to have the event happen as it did.
7	"Despot"	Grant Brown	Mark Rosner	August 8, 2019	1.51
A military general named Kivani and his wife are on holiday on the island, but it gets spoiled by an armed airplane attacking them, killing a guard. Cat though does save the general's wife, and said general has taken a liking to Cat because of it. As if one problem for Cat was not enough, now she has got to deal with Petra wanting to know why Cat killed Petra's father and that Jake was now having a thing with Ana. While Jake handles Petra, Cole finds the pilot who attacked the general has died after landing. General Kivani however has some shady secrets on him that Cat finds, while Cole and Jake arrive at the party in the believe his assistant Leon is the one trying to kill the general. To all surprise the general's own wife knocks wine onto her husband which contained a fast-acting poison, killing him. Leon though used it to flee with all of the general's treasures, but is caught in the act. He was not the only one though, his own wife intended to do the same, but Cat brought karma to her too.
8	"The Comeback"	Grant Brown	Laura Wolner	August 15, 2019	1.77
During a surfing contest, Tori returns and brings a veteran named Marcy Brooks, who has history with Cat. The contest however is cut short when a jet ski-riding assassin suddenly shows up and kills some participants and despite Cat's effort to stop him escapes. The first suspect is Jimmy Kinsella, a spear fishermen which is illegal on the reef, only he is found dead. To protect Marcy, Cat has her lay low at her beach-house from someone Marcy's provoked, but Jake suspects Marcy is hiding something. Suddenly Marcy ups and disappears, so Cat goes searching, though found Marcy's sponsors were smuggling OxyContin around the Pacific, and that Marcy is a pawn in it. They recruit Cat into it and she complies, though not enthusiastically. They also try to eliminate her, but a friend of Doug saves the day while Cole takes care Marcy's doctor Benjamin who was also involved with the smuggling.
9	"The Hohenzollern Collection"	Kieran Darcy-Smith	Brandon K. Hines	August 22, 2019	1.95
Cat finds herself hired by a woman named Betty Ann Miller who claims several German jewels have been stolen to the reef, although the jewels have been saved and thieves caught by Jake Cole. Even so Betty wants Cat to snatch them for her, particularly a sapphire ring. Cat purposely gets arrested to scope out how to get the jewelry, then finds Petra is dealing drugs just to get money because Cat refused to lend some. Even worse, Betty has recruited Tori Eastland into their little mission. While Tori distracts the security, Cat sneaks into the police station to get the jewelry, only for Betty to double-cross and trap Cat in the evidence-room and make off with the jewels. Desperate, Cat calls Petra for rescue who succeeds, then confronts Betty (having given a tracking device along with the jewels) on a secluded beach, only for both to be double-crossed by Tori who is eager for payback on Cat. All three however get arrested by the police, but Cat is let out, and gets to keep the sapphire ring.
10	"Blue Skies"	Kieran Darcy-Smith	Teleplay by : Haley Harris and Mark Rosner; Story by : Haley Harris	August 29, 2019	2.14
Petra suddenly herself a pawn in someone else's crime and finds herself at the mercy of Doug's sister Regina and Cat has to rescue her. After she and Otter subdue the lackeys, she tries to get backup but fails: even Doug himself will not help. However a SWAT team just happens to be at the same place, having followed the credit cards Cat was tasked to deliver to Regina in exchange for Petra, though Cat does not cooperate that easily while Petra frees herself. As fate would have it, Regina's base of operations happens to be the nightclub Ana is at for a special occasion, and Jake shows up too, then Kristy and her team put an end to Regina's plans. Cat tries to advise Petra from getting into more trouble while Cole's relationship with Kristy seems to be diminishing, but all's well that ends well.
11	"Dream Lover"	Fiona Banks	Robert Port	August 29, 2019	1.66
It is Cat's birthday and a party is thrown at a local pub, but she suddenly falls ill and goes to a hospital the next day. Turns out a deadly bacteria was unleashed specifically for her as everyone else is unaffected, and Cat is in danger of dying. While under the bacteria's affects Cat begins having strange dreams about her friends and associates. Meanwhile Cole and Jake race to find a cure, with the latter taking a little too personally to boot, and even Petra, who is not very fond of Cat, does not want her dead. However some Australian official does, due to having a man named Shane Newton (who works for Carter no less) put contaminated lipstick in Cat's purse. Thankfully Jake and Cole managed to persuade Shane to save Cat via a blood transfusion, although it turned out Cat was just a pawn to kill Shane, but he too was saved.
12	"Prison Break"	Fiona Banks	Norman Morrill	September 5, 2019	1.45
Petra's home is ransacked and it seems Doug has something to do with it, along with those airplane hijackers from episode six. Petra herself though is fine except she smuggled a tool into the prison for the inmates, and after Cat shows up, Doug and the hijackers make their escape, taking Cat with them. Naturally everyone assumes Cat's helping on purpose, and it turns out Petra has become their ally. While in hiding Pink tries to get rid of Cat, but Doug stops it by killing Pink's ally, and during the confrontation Cat slips away. Cole and Jake find the hideout and catch Petra, while Cat warns Jake that he is Doug's target before going into hiding for the time being. The real deal however centers around Carter, who is forced to help Doug and Pink escape, while Cat has to hide at Dylan Sawyer's place.
13	"Endgame"	Steve Pearlman	Michelle Lirtzman	September 13, 2019	2.14
The hunt from the previous episode continues, with Doug and Pink taking shelter in a barn with Carter Tori Eastland as hostages. Doug's sister Regina returns but is reluctant to rat out her own brother. Cat unfortunately gets tracked down, forcing her to flee Dylan's island. She managed to track down Doug though and they share a moment, though then sends a message to Cole, whose career is in jeopardy for letting Cat get away in the last episode. Regina though also informs Jake while Doug and Pink try to make their getaway with their prizes on a seaplane, though Cole catches them in the nick of time and kills Pink. Doug however flees through the water toward the other side of it. Cat gives chase and intercepts Doug, who is incapacitated by Jake. In the aftermath, Ana is promoted to governor, Cat is cleared of charges and Wyatt gets to keep his job, but Jake decides to move away from the Reef, and later that night, his boathouse ets blown up and Cat is kidnapped...

== Reception ==
=== Critical response ===
On Rotten Tomatoes the series has an approval rating of 33% based on 6 reviews, with an average rating of 5/10.

=== Ratings ===
Viewership and ratings per episode of Reef Break
No.	Title	Air date	Rating/share (18–49)	Viewers (millions)	DVR (18–49)	DVR viewers (millions)	Total (18–49)	Total viewers (millions)
1	"Pilot"	June 20, 2019	0.5/3	2.84	0.2	1.31	0.7	4.16
2	"Lost and Found"	June 27, 2019	0.3/2	1.98	0.2	1.10	0.5	3.08
3	"Buried Things"	July 11, 2019	0.4/2	2.28	0.1	1.24	0.5	3.52
4	"Welcome to the Jungle"	July 18, 2019	0.3/2	1.85	0.1	1.17	0.4	3.02
5	"The Green Tide"	July 25, 2019	0.3/2	1.91	0.1	1.13	0.4	3.04
6	"The Two O'Clock Flight"	August 1, 2019	0.3/2	1.97	0.1	1.13	0.4	3.10
7	"Despot"	August 8, 2019	0.2/1	1.51	0.1	1.00	0.4	2.69
8	"The Comeback"	August 15, 2019	0.2/2	1.77	0.2	1.02	0.4	2.82
9	"The Hohenzollern Collection"	August 22, 2019	0.3/2	1.95	0.2	1.14	0.5	3.15
10	"Blue Skies"	August 29, 2019	0.4/2	2.14	0.1	0.90	0.5	3.17
11	"Dream Lover"	August 29, 2019	0.2/1	1.66	0.1	1.01	0.4	2.79
12	"Prison Break"	September 5, 2019	0.3/1	1.45	0.1	1.01	0.4	2.46
13	"Endgame"	September 13, 2019	0.3/2	2.14	0.1	1.01	0.4	3.15
