= Jane Wu (director) =

American television producer and director

Jane Wu is an American-Taiwanese producer, director, and storyboard artist, best known for 2023 animated series Blue Eye Samurai.

== Early life ==
Born in Taiwan, Wu moved to the United States at the age of eight and resided in Southern California. She has described herself as a “tomboy” in her early childhood.

== Career ==
Wu originally started in fashion and costume design, then opened a comic book store, which led her to apply her drawing skills towards becoming an animation artist.

She was a storyboard artist at Disney until she was contacted by Joss Whedon to work on The Avengers. Her work includes Captain America: The First Avenger, Thor: The Dark World, Guardians of the Galaxy, House of the Dragon, Mulan, and Spider-Man: Into the Spider-Verse.

Wu is known for her action scenes.

== Personal life ==
Wu is trained in the wushu martial art , which has impacted her storyboarding. She is known for her pink hair.
