= With Love (TV series) =

American romantic comedy television series

- Genre: Romantic comedy
- Created by: Gloria Calderón Kellett
- Starring: Emeraude Toubia; Mark Indelicato; Isis King; Vincent Rodriguez III; Rome Flynn; Desmond Chiam; Benito Martinez; Constance Marie; Todd Grinnell
- Music by: Siddhartha Khosla; Lauren Culjak
- Country of origin: United States
- Original language: English
- No. of seasons: 2
- No. of episodes: 11

Production
- Executive producers: Gloria Calderón Kellett; Meera Menon; Andy Roth
- Producers: Pixie Wespiser; Linda Morel; Sandi Hochman
- Cinematography: Sandra Valde-Hansen; Steve Gainer
- Editors: Pat Barnett; Sue Federman; Iris Hershner; Gerald Valdez; Kyla Plewes; Stephanie Goldstein
- Running time: 46–54 minutes
- Production companies: GloNation; Big Indie Pictures; Amazon Studios

Original release
- Network: Amazon Prime Video
- Release: December 17, 2021 – June 2, 2023

With Love is an American romantic comedy television series created by Gloria Calderón Kellett that premiered on Amazon Prime Video on December 17, 2021. In April 2022, the series was renewed for a second season which premiered on June 2, 2023. In November 2023, the series was canceled after two seasons.

== Cast and characters ==
=== Main ===
- Emeraude Toubia as Lily Diaz
- Mark Indelicato as Jorge Diaz Jr., Lily's brother
- Isis King as Sol Perez, the Diaz siblings' maternal cousin and a trans non-binary oncologist
- Vincent Rodriguez III as Henry Cruz, Jorge's boyfriend
- Rome Flynn as Santiago Zayas
- Desmond Chiam as Nick Zhao, Jorge's best friend who has been in love with Lily since he was in college
- Benito Martinez as Jorge Diaz Sr. (season 1; recurring season 2), the Diaz siblings' father
- Constance Marie as Beatriz Diaz (season 1; recurring season 2), Jorge Sr.'s wife and the Diaz siblings' mother
- Todd Grinnell as Miles Murphy, Sol's love interest who is a plastic surgeon

=== Recurring ===
- Andre Royo as Laz Zayas, Santiago's father
- Renée Victor as Marta Delgado, the Diaz siblings and Sol's grandmother
- Pepe Serna as Luis Delgado, Marta's husband
- Gloria Calderón Kellett as Gladys Delgado, Beatriz's sister and the Diaz siblings' maternal aunt
- Kalen Allen as Cyn, one of Sol's best friends
- EJ Johnson as Melo, another one of Sol's best friends
- Julissa Calderon as Annie
- W. Tré Davis as Andre
- Fernando Martinez as Chuey
- Birdie Silverstein as Charlie, Miles' nonbinary teenager
- Scott Evans as James (season 2), one of Henry's best friends
- Adrian Gonzalez as Javier (season 2), another one of Henry's best friends

== Episodes ==
=== Series overview ===
Season	Episodes	Originally released
1	5	December 17, 2021
2	6	June 2, 2023

=== Season 1 (2021) ===
No. overall	No. in season	Title	Directed by	Written by	Original release date
1	1	"Nochebuena"	Meera Menon	Gloria Calderón Kellett	December 17, 2021
2	2	"New Year's Eve"	Linda Mendoza	Matthew Cruz	December 17, 2021
3	3	"Valentine's Day"	Kimberly McCullough	Eli Wilson Pelton	December 17, 2021
4	4	"Independence Day"	Hiromi Kamata	Andy Roth & Juliany Taveras	December 17, 2021
5	5	"Día De Los Muertos"	Meera Menon	Marcos Luevanos	December 17, 2021

=== Season 2 (2023) ===
No. overall	No. in season	Title	Directed by	Written by	Original release date
6	1	"Christmas Eve"	Paris Barclay	Gloria Calderón Kellett & Andy Roth	June 2, 2023
7	2	"Engagement Party"	Kim Nguyen	Amanda Lasher	June 2, 2023
8	3	"Lily's Double Quinceañera"	Eli Gonda	Juliany Taveras	June 2, 2023
9	4	"Bachelor Party"	Aprill Winney	James Sweeney	June 2, 2023
10	5	"Thanksgiving"	Kabir Akhtar	Arielle Díaz	June 2, 2023
11	6	"The Wedding"	Kim Nguyen	Gloria Calderón Kellett & Montserrat Luna-Ballantyne & Andy Roth	June 2, 2023

== Production ==
=== Development ===
On May 27, 2021, it was reported that Amazon had given the production a series order. With Love is created by Gloria Calderón Kellett who also is expected to executive produce alongside Meera Menon. The pilot is written by Kellett and directed by Menon. The production companies involved with the series are GloNation and Amazon Studios. On April 8, 2022, Amazon renewed the series for a six-episode second season. On November 21, 2023, it was reported that the series was canceled after two seasons.

=== Casting ===
On June 3, 2021, Emeraude Toubia was cast to star. A day later, Mark Indelicato joined the main cast. On June 9, 2021, Rome Flynn, Isis King, Todd Grinnell, Desmond Chiam were cast as series regulars. Two days later, Constance Marie, Benito Martinez, and Vincent Rodriguez III joined the cast in starring roles. On June 28, 2021, Andre Royo was cast in a recurring capacity. On August 20, 2021, Renée Victor and Pepe Serna joined the cast in recurring roles. On July 11, 2022, Scott Evans was cast in an undisclosed capacity for the second season.

== Release ==
The five-episode first season of With Love was released on December 17, 2021. The six-episode second season premiered on June 2, 2023.

== Reception ==
=== Critical response ===
The review aggregator website Rotten Tomatoes reported a 100% approval rating with an average rating of 7/10, based on 13 critic reviews. The website's critics consensus reads, "Depicting the travails of a close-knit family with unabashed warmth, With Love tempers its earnestness with grounded characters." Metacritic, which uses a weighted average, assigned a score of 75 out of 100 based on 7 critics, indicating "generally favorable reviews".

=== Accolades ===
With Love was nominated for the Outstanding New TV Series category for the 33rd GLAAD Media Awards in 2022.
