= Joy Ride (2023 film) =

Film directed by Adele Lim

- Theatrical release poster
- Directed by: Adele Lim
- Screenplay by: Cherry Chevapravatdumrong; Teresa Hsiao
- Story by: Cherry Chevapravatdumrong; Teresa Hsiao; Adele Lim
- Produced by: Seth Rogen; Evan Goldberg; James Weaver; Josh Fagen; Cherry Chevapravatdumrong; Teresa Hsiao; Adele Lim
- Starring: Ashley Park; Sherry Cola; Stephanie Hsu; Sabrina Wu
- Cinematography: Paul Yee
- Edited by: Nena Erb
- Music by: Nathan Matthew David
- Production companies: Point Grey Pictures; Red Mysterious Hippo
- Distributed by: Lionsgate
- Release dates: March 17, 2023 (SXSW); July 7, 2023 (United States)
- Running time: 95 minutes
- Country: United States
- Language: English
- Box office: $15.8 million

Joy Ride is a 2023 American comedy film directed by Adele Lim, and written by Cherry Chevapravatdumrong and Teresa Hsiao. The film stars Ashley Park, Sherry Cola, Stephanie Hsu, and Sabrina Wu.

The film was announced in 2018 following a partnership deal between Point Grey Pictures and Lionsgate, with Lim being confirmed as director in 2021. The cast was announced between August and October of the same year, and filming took place in British Columbia throughout the latter month.

Joy Ride had its world premiere at SXSW on March 17, 2023, and was released in the United States on July 7, 2023, by Lionsgate Films. It received positive reviews from critics and grossed $16 million.

== Plot ==
Asian adoptee Audrey Sullivan lives with white parents, Joe and Mary Sullivan, in White Hills, Washington, along with her childhood best friend, Lolo Chen, who is also Asian but with biological parents. Audrey is an overachiever who works as a lawyer for a prestigious firm, while Lolo struggles to make ends meet with her sex-positive art.

Promised a promotion to partner if she can close a deal with a Chinese businessman, Audrey and Lolo fly to China, joined by Lolo's cousin Vanessa, nicknamed "Deadeye", who is socially awkward and obsessed with K-pop. In Beijing, Audrey meets with her college roommate and close friend Kat, who is an actress on a popular daytime show, and despite being sexually promiscuous in college, is engaged to her co-star and Christian fiancé Clarence, who is saving himself for marriage.

The group meet Chao, the Chinese businessman, at a party. He insists that for him to do business with Audrey, he must know about her birth family, whom she has never met. Lolo lies to him that Audrey is in close contact with them. Prior to the trip, Lolo had called Audrey's adoption agency and tracked them down. Audrey resolves to meet her birth mother and take her to Chao's party to close the deal.

The quartet board a train to the agency, where they unknowingly share a compartment with a drug dealer. They are forced to consume copious amounts of cocaine before a train inspection; the drug dealer then steals their luggage and they get kicked off the train.

Stranded in the middle of rural China, Lolo contacts former NBA star Baron Davis, whose team is currently playing in China. The four injure some of the players in sex- and dance-related accidents the following night, causing the team to refuse to drive them to their destination.

The group hitchhike their way to the agency. There, Audrey discovers that her mother is not Chinese but rather Korean. In a last-ditch effort to secure the deal, one of Deadeye's online friends secures them a private jet to Seoul, but without their passports, they pretend to be a new Korean idol group to pass the border. Lolo livestreams their idol performance of "WAP" on Instagram Live to prove their legitimacy, only for Kat's skirt to accidentally fall off, revealing a large devil tattoo in her pubic area. They are forced to instead take a boat into mainland Korea.

Lolo's livestream inadvertently goes viral, with hundreds of millions of people seeing Kat's tattoo. Chao calls Audrey to inform her that the deal is off; she then is fired from her job, while Kat is at risk of losing her television deal and Clarence. The quartet have a falling out and split.

Audrey learns that her birth mother has died, so visits her grave. There she meets her birth mother's husband Dae Han. He shows her a video recorded by her birth mother before her death, then reveals her friends had told him he might find Audrey at the grave. Meanwhile, Kat reconciles with Clarence. Lolo moves out of Audrey's house, Audrey returns to Seattle and makes peace with Lolo and Deadeye.

One year later, Audrey, Lolo, Kat, and Deadeye are in Paris for a best-friends trip. Audrey has started her own law firm, Lolo has begun waiting tables and selling her art, Deadeye has accepted themself as non-binary, while Kat's acting career has recovered and she is planning her wedding to Clarence.

== Cast ==
- Ashley Park as Audrey Sullivan, a lawyer who was adopted from China by white parents
  - Lennon Yee as young Audrey Sullivan
  - Isla Rose Hall as teenage Audrey Sullivan
- Sherry Cola as Lolo Chen, an aspiring artist who is Audrey's best friend
  - Belle Zhang as young Lolo Chen
  - Chloe Pun as teenage Lolo Chen
- Stephanie Hsu as Kat Huang, a famous Chinese actress who was Audrey's former college roommate
- Sabrina Wu as Vanessa / Deadeye, Lolo's eccentric cousin who is obsessed with K-pop
- Ronny Chieng as Chao, a Chinese businessman
- Meredith Hagner as Jess, the drug smuggler on the Chinese train
- David Denman as Joe Sullivan, Audrey's adoptive father
- Annie Mumolo as Mary Sullivan, Audrey's adoptive mother
- Timothy Simons as Frank, Audrey's law firm boss
- Daniel Dae Kim as Dae Han, the husband of Audrey's birth mother
- Desmond Chiam as Clarence, Kat's celibate fiancé
- Baron Davis as a fictionalized version of himself, a former NBA basketball player who is now playing in China
- Lori Tan Chinn as Nai Nai, Lolo's grandmother
- Alexander Hodge as Todd, a basketball player on Baron's team and Kat's ex-boyfriend
- Chris Pang as Kenny, a basketball player on Baron's team
- Rohain Arora as Arvind, a basketball player on Baron's team
- Victor Lau as Jiaying, a basketball player on Baron's team
- Debbie Fan as Jenny Chen, Lolo's mother
- Kenneth Liu as Wey Chen, Lolo's father
- Michelle Choi-Lee as Min Park, Audrey's birth mother

== Production ==
On August 9, 2018, it was announced that Seth Rogen and Evan Goldberg were in negotiations to partner with Lionsgate through their production company Point Grey Pictures in a first-look deal to develop film and television projects. On July 9, 2021, it was announced that screenwriter Adele Lim would make her feature directorial debut on an untitled R-rated comedy film from that deal, with Ashley Park joining the cast. The film was written by Cherry Chevapravatdumrong and Teresa Hsiao, based on a story they developed with Lim. Chevapravatdumrong, Hsiao, and Lim also produce alongside Rogen, Goldberg, James Weaver, and Josh Fagen. In a statement, Lim said, "This journey began with me, Cherry, and Teresa wanting to tell a story with characters who look like us, about women who are messy and thirsty, but have so much heart. Point Grey and Lionsgate have been incredible allies and partners from day one, and I am thrilled to be making my directing debut with them on a story that's so special to me."

In August 2021, Sherry Cola and Stephanie Hsu were added to the cast. In September, it was reported that Sabrina Wu would star as the fourth and final lead in the film. Daniel Dae Kim was cast while working with Lim on Raya and the Last Dragon. He had previously worked with Park on Broadway and suggested her for the lead role. Production began by October, with Desmond Chiam, Alexander Hodge, and Chris Pang joining the cast. Filming occurred in Vancouver. Filming also took place at Seattle–Tacoma International Airport in Seattle. On October 7, a lewd playground serving as a set for the film was spotted in Maple Ridge, British Columbia but a sequence filmed for it was cut. Hsu used a body double for the scene involving her character's tattoo. While the writers were considering an original composition for the scene where the characters pretend to be an idol group, they eventually decided that "WAP" served as "this perfect song that really encapsulated the movie at this pivotal moment", leading Lim to write a letter to Cardi B and Megan Thee Stallion asking for usage permission, meeting their approval. A scene involving a water buffalo was planned but not filmed. In February 2023, the film's title was revealed to be Joy Ride. The film's working title was Joy Fuck Club.

== Release ==
Joy Ride premiered at 2023 South by Southwest Film & TV Festival on March 17, 2023. It was theatrically released on July 7, 2023, by Lionsgate Films. It was originally scheduled to be released on June 23.

The film was released for digital platforms on July 28, 2023, followed by a Blu-ray and DVD release on September 12, 2023.

== Reception ==
=== Box office ===
In United States and Canada, Joy Ride was released alongside Insidious: The Red Door, and was projected to gross $7–9 million from 2,820 theaters in its opening weekend. The film made $2.6 million on its first day, including $1.1 million from Thursday night previews. The film went on to debut to $5.9 million, finishing sixth at the box office. In its second weekend the film made $2.6 million, dropping 56% and finishing ninth. Ultimately, the film was a box-office failure, grossing $16 million worldwide against a production budget of $32 million.

=== Critical response ===
Joy Ride received positive reviews upon release. On the review aggregator website Rotten Tomatoes, 90% of 215 critics' reviews are positive, with an average rating of 7.4/10. The website's consensus reads: "Joy Ride isn't afraid to shock with its gross-out gags, but this road trip's real surprise is how successfully it blends its raunchy humor with real heart." Metacritic, which uses a weighted average, assigned the film a score of 74 out of 100, based on 44 critics, indicating "generally favorable" reviews. Audiences polled by CinemaScore gave the film an average grade of "B−" on an A+ to F scale, while PostTrak reported 79% of filmgoers gave it a positive score.

Lovia Gyarkye of The Hollywood Reporter called the film "a raunchy and propulsive feature directorial debut", adding that it "gets off on putting its characters through absurd, often side-splittingly funny situations" and "is packed with frenetic cocaine-fueled decision-making, raunchy threesomes and chaotic impersonations". Variety's Peter Debruge wrote, "The movie may not be Bridesmaids-level brilliant, but it's got more than a couple hall-of-fame-worthy comedy set-pieces". IndieWire's Marisa Mirabal gave the film a grade of A−, saying that it is "a prime example of how important representation is on screen and proves that Asian American comedians can be just as funny, raunchy, and successful as their white male counterparts." Filmmaker Sean Baker named it as one of his favorite films of 2023. The Guardian critic Adrian Horton considered the film to be part of a resurgence in the return of raunchy comedies to movie theaters, following a period of decline.
