= Old Gays =

Group of social media personalities

TikTok information
- Page: The Old Gays
- Followers: 10.8 million
- Last updated: May 11, 2025

The Old Gays are a group of four gay social media personalities and LGBT rights activists. The group consists of Robert Reeves, Michael "Mick" Peterson, Bill Lyons, and Jessay Martin. At the time of their formation, their age range was from mid-60s to late 70s. They are the subject of an upcoming unscripted docuseries produced by Brian Graden Media.

== History ==
=== 1943-1980: Background ===
Robert E. Reeves was born on June 8, 1943 to a supportive middle-class family in Jonesboro, Arkansas. By third grade, Reeves worked the cash register and helped people at his father's shoe store, which shared the space with a nearby bakery, played the baritone saxophone in high school and attended a rural Southern Baptist church.

William C. "Bill" Lyons was born on May 18, 1944 to a loving mother and charismatic father in Covina, California. He was the eldest of five siblings, though his father favored his younger brother for getting a basketball scholarship to UCLA. Lyons grew up working for his family's restaurant, Lyons Den, before working as a general manager for the Galleria Design Center, an interior design showroom in San Francisco's SOMA neighborhood.

Joc James A. Anderson, PsyD was born in the Philippines but considers himself a native Californian after moving with his family to Mission District, San Francisco at four years of age.

=== 1980-2003: The golden days and the AIDS crisis. ===
After resigning from Newtown over homophobia from SLU's Jesuit community, Reeves moved to San Francisco in 1980 and befriended Lyons while city planning a baseball stadium in the SOMA neighborhood. After many of his friends and partners died throughout the start of the AIDS Crisis, Reeves tested positive for HIV in 1987 and later moved to Cathedral City to focus on making art.

=== 2003-2017: Formation ===
Reeves was forced to file for bankruptcy until two gay men bought $16,000 worth of art from his Laguna Beach gallery. To help cover his bills, Reeves transformed his garage into a living space and rented out his three bedrooms on Craigslist. His first and only constant tenant was Peterson, who took the master bedroom with private bath after a sexual encounter with Reeves. Martin moved across the street from them in 2015 while touring as a gospel singer and working as a florist.

=== 2016-2021: A new beginning ===
John Bates, a younger gay man who moved into a separate bedroom in November 2016, tried to liven up the household to no avail before getting into a relationship with Logo TV producer Ryan Yezak at a gay bar down the street the following February. Initially perplexed that Bates lived with "a bunch of old farts," Yezak grew to appreciate the group after initially meeting Reeves and Peterson, who were completely nude. While getting stoned, Reeves grew interested in a Gen-Z catchphrase used by the younger couple, prompting them to record the older group trying to decipher Gen-Z slang. Upon noticing the organic comedy and chemistry between the three, Bates and Yezak officially rebadged them as the "Old Gays" and uploaded the video to YouTube.

The video was an immediate hit amongst audiences, though Yezak felt the group was "too white" and needed diverse representation. This was swiftly resolved once Martin spoke with Reeves after seeing their first video and immediately handed over his business card to appear in their second video, which had the group perform as drag queens. But shortly after Martin officially joined the group, Peterson suffered a seizure of unknown origin and had to be rushed to a nearby hospital for a neurosurgical operation on his left eye, which had a giant bleeding gash. Peterson returned to Reeves' home after recovering in an assisted living facility, though his health continued to worsen to the point where he overdosed on gabapentin and was rushed back to the hospital in 2020. After another stint in assisted living, Peterson decided to move to a nearby motel until his 64th birthday, when he returned to Reeves' home and gradually became healthy again.

=== 2021-Present: Online Success ===
The group became a viral sensation in March 2021, gaining millions of followers from daily TikTok videos filmed at Reeves' house. Their popularity would later hit the mainstream with appearances on Drew Barrymore and The Today Show, collaborations with Netflix, T-Mobile and Rihanna's Savage X Fenty, and the 44th spot on Forbes' 2022 Top Creators list.

The group was later expanded after Anderson, now a psychologist from nearby Rancho Mirage, first appeared in a video dancing to Shania Twain's Man! I Feel Like a Woman! alongside Twain, Lyons, Martin and Justin Fuko on June 30, 2023. Anderson officially joined the group the following August after filling in for Reeves, who had been hospitalized with a urinary tract infection.

== Personal lives ==
Reeves was diagnosed with HIV in 1987. Peterson tested positive in 2001 and was also diagnosed with chronic CIDP in the late 2010s, both being treated with five-hour immunoglobulin infusions every other week.
