= Ashley Park (actress) =

American actress and musician (born 1991)

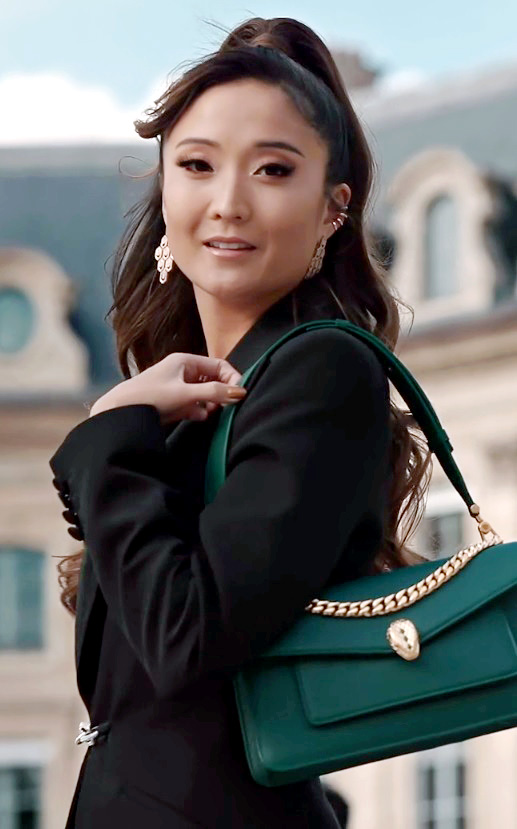
- Park in 2023
- Born: June 6, 1991 (age 35); Glendale, California, U.S.
- Education: University of Michigan (BFA)
- Occupation: Actress
- Years active: 2009–present
- Relatives: Justin H. Min (second cousin)

Ashley Jeein Park (born June 6, 1991) is an American actress and musician. She is best known for her portrayal of Mindy Chen on the Netflix comedy series Emily in Paris (2020–present). She originated the role of Gretchen Wieners in the Broadway musical Mean Girls, for which she was nominated for a Tony Award for Best Featured Actress in a Musical.

Her theatre roles include Tuptim in the 2015 Broadway revival of The King and I and MwE in Ars Nova's off-Broadway musical KPOP. She starred in Adele Lim's directorial debut, Joy Ride, and has had recurring roles in Beef and Only Murders in the Building.

== Early life and education ==
Park was born in Glendale, California, and grew up in Ann Arbor, Michigan. She is of Korean descent, and is a second cousin of actor Justin H. Min.

Park was placed in dance classes at the Oceanside Dance Academy at age three and began piano lessons at age five. Her love of performing led her to participate in Ann Arbor's community kids' theatre throughout middle school and high school. She attended Interlochen Summer Arts Camp in 2003. Park attended Pioneer High School where she participated in both theatre and choir. She co-founded a women's a cappella group at Pioneer High School, Soulfege, which placed second at a national competition in 2009.

During her sophomore year in high school, at age 15, Park was diagnosed with acute myeloid leukemia and was hospitalized for eight months. Park was a recipient of a "wish" from the Make-A-Wish Foundation for which she and her family went to New York City and saw the Broadway productions of A Chorus Line, The Lion King, Spring Awakening, and Wicked. In interviews she has stated, "My cancer experience is, I think, the reason I do theater... As soon as I was out of the hospital, all I wanted to do is be around people." After chemotherapy, Park returned to high school, and three months later, she was cast as the lead role of Millie Dillmount in her high school's production of Thoroughly Modern Millie. Park has disclosed that during this time, "putting on a wig and putting on shoes and costume and being a different person was the best escape from being just the girl who had cancer".

Park graduated from Pioneer High School in 2009 and then attended the University of Michigan, earning a BFA degree in musical theatre from the School of Music, Theater, and Dance in 2013. During her undergraduate years, she co-founded the Michigan Performance Outreach Workshop (MPOW).

== Career ==
In 2009, Park made her professional theatre debut as Yvonne in Music Theatre Wichita's production of Miss Saigon. She spent the following two summers performing in Pittsburgh Civic Light Opera's Benedum Center production of Miss Saigon, with which she earned her Equity card. Park made her Broadway debut as a member of the ensemble in Mamma Mia! at the Broadhurst Theatre on February 17, 2014. She left the production on September 21, 2014. From October 2014 to January 2015, Park portrayed Gabrielle in the original U.S. national touring company of Rodgers + Hammerstein's Cinderella.

Park returned to Broadway on April 16, 2015, in her first leading role as Tuptim in the 2015 revival of The King and I at the Vivian Beaumont Theater and remained with the production until its closing on June 26, 2016. Park was featured as a principal soloist on the cast recording for which she was nominated for a Grammy Award. In February 2017, she appeared in the Broadway revival of Sunday in the Park with George as Celeste #1 and Theresa alongside Jake Gyllenhaal, Annaleigh Ashford, and Ruthie Ann Miles. In the fall of 2017, Park portrayed MwE in the off-Broadway musical KPOP at the Ars Nova. She was nominated for a Drama Desk Award and a Drama League Award and also won a Lucille Lortel Award for this role. Park left the production in October 2017 due to her beginning rehearsals for the Mean Girls out-of-town tryout and was replaced by Marina Kondo.

Park starred as Gretchen Wieners in the Tony Award-nominated Broadway musical Mean Girls, written by Tina Fey with music and lyrics by Jeff Richmond and Nell Benjamin, respectively. The show had its world premiere as an out-of-town tryout at the National Theatre in Washington, D.C., from October 31, 2017, to December 3, 2017, in which Park originated the role of Gretchen Wieners. The musical, which is based on the film of the same name, began previews on March 12, 2018, and officially opened on Broadway on April 8, 2018, at the August Wilson Theatre in New York City. Park received nominations for numerous awards for her role as Gretchen Wieners, including nominations for the Tony Award for Best Featured Actress in a Musical, a Drama League Award, and the Drama Desk Award for Outstanding Featured Actress in a Musical. In May 2018 Park was awarded the Clarence Derwent Award, an honor "given to the most promising female and male performers" in New York City, by the Actors' Equity Foundation, along with Sean Carvajal. On March 10, 2019, Park left the production and was replaced by Krystina Alabado. In June 2019, it was announced that Park would headline a "revamped" production of Thoroughly Modern Millie from May 6–10, 2020, for New York City Center Encores!. However, due to the COVID-19 pandemic, the production was cancelled, and ticket refunds were offered to the public.

Park was cast in August 2019 in the role of Mindy Chen in Netflix's Emily in Paris, opposite Lily Collins. The series premiered on October 2, 2020, and was renewed for a second season on November 11, 2020. Park's character covered "La Vie en Rose" in the first season of Emily in Paris. It was the most downloaded TV song for that week. In October 2020 it was announced that Park would appear as Kaye Fields in As the Curtain Rises, an original podcast soap opera from the Broadway Podcast Network. On December 28, 2020, it was announced that Park would star as Colette in a benefit concert presentation of Ratatouille the Musical, an internet meme that originated on TikTok, inspired by the 2007 Disney/Pixar film Ratatouille. The concert streamed on TodayTix on January 1, 2021.

In August 2021, it was announced Park would star as Cinderella in the 2022 Encores! version of Into the Woods. She was ultimately replaced by Denée Benton. In 2021 she joined Girls5eva as Ashley, the fifth member of the female pop group, who died falling off of an infinity pool. She appeared in flashback on the first two seasons on Peacock and in the third season on Netflix. Park starred in Crazy Rich Asians writer Adele Lim's 2023 directorial debut, Joy Ride. The R-rated comedy "follows four Asian American women as they travel through Asia in search of one of their birth mothers." In 2023, Park played Naomi in Netflix's dark comedy Beef and Kimber in the third season of Hulu's Only Murders in the Building.

=== Modeling and fashion design ===
During her career, Park has appeared on the covers of numerous fashion and lifestyle magazines such as US' L'Officiel, Shape, Women's Health and Canada's Fashion. She appeared on the February 2023 digital cover of Vogue Hong Kong. She has appeared in editorials for US' Paper, Cosmopolitan, People and Korea's Odda.

In November 2022, she designed a holiday-themed clothing collection in collaboration with Rent the Runway. In March 2023, she appeared in an advertising campaign for Skechers' Uno sneaker. Later that year Park co-designed a sneaker collection, named "Street Glam" with Skechers.

== Philanthropy and activism ==
As a student at the University of Michigan, Park was the co-founder of the Michigan Performance Outreach Workshop (MPOW), a student-run organization with the purpose of bringing performing arts educational opportunities to students in southeastern Michigan to, "foster creative expression, build self-esteem, and strengthen the community." MPOW hosts an on-campus workshop each semester for 130-200 public-school students that includes performances by University of Michigan students as well as immersive and collaborative workshops in arts-based disciplines. In 2013 Park was awarded with the Willis Patterson Diversity Award for using her "talents and scholarly abilities to enhance the development of, and appreciation for, a more culturally and ethnically diverse community in the School of Music, Theatre & Dance" at the University of Michigan.

During her undergraduate years, Park was involved with the Prison Creative Arts Project, an organization that engages "those impacted by the justice system into artistic collaboration" with University of Michigan students for "mutual learning and growth through theatre, dance, visual art, creative writing, slam poetry, and music" in Ann Arbor, Michigan.

Since moving to NYC, Park has participated in events supporting Broadway Cares/Equity Fights AIDS (BCEFA). In June 2018, she participated in the 28th annual Broadway Bares, an annual burlesque/striptease show fundraiser for BCEFA, and personally raised nearly $3,000 for the organization. In August 2018 Park participated in Covenant House's Stage & Screen Sleep Out along with Mean Girls co-stars Kyle Selig and Curtis Holland, and together they raised over $14,000 for the organization which provides shelter, food, and crisis care for the homeless and runaway youth.

She has served as a mentor and held masterclasses for various programs and organizations, such as The Broadway Collective and Broadway Workshop. During the COVID-19 pandemic, Park set up a second Instagram account from which she began offering ten-minute one-on-one lessons and daily question-and-answer sessions via Zoom in exchange for donations to the Actors Fund.

== Personal life ==
During the COVID-19 pandemic, Park lived in New York, Texas (with her family), and California (with her friend Jonalyn Saxer).

In 2023, Park was in a relationship with British actor Paul Forman. The two had first met as co-stars on the third season of Emily in Paris in 2022. In October 2025, Park and Forman broke up after two years.

In late December 2023, Park was hospitalized due to life-threatening critical septic shock while on vacation in the Republic of Maldives. In the following weeks, she posted about her ongoing recovery, which resulted in a delay of her starting production on the fourth season of Emily in Paris.

== Theatre credits ==
| Year | Title | Role | Theatre | Director(s) | Ref. |
|---|---|---|---|---|---|
| 2009 | Miss Saigon | Yvonne/Ensemble | Music Theatre Wichita | Darren Lee | |
| 2010 | Miss Saigon | Yvonne/Ensemble | Benedum Center | Barry Ivan | |
| 2011 | Jekyll & Hyde | Ensemble | Benedum Center | Robert Cuccioli | |
| 2011 | Jesus Christ Superstar | Herod's Girl/Ensemble | Benedum Center | Charles Repole | |
| 2011 | Love Changes Everything | Ensemble | Benedum Center | Louanne Madorma | |
| 2011 | The Sound of Music | Ensemble | Benedum Center | James Brennan | |
| 2014 | Mamma Mia! | Ensemble (replacement) | Broadhurst Theatre† | Phyllida Lloyd | |
| 2014 | Rodgers + Hammerstein's Cinderella | Gabrielle | U.S. National Tour | Mark Brokaw | |
| 2015–16 | The King and I | Tuptim | Vivian Beaumont Theater† | Bartlett Sher | |
| 2016 | The Fantasticks | Luisa | Pasadena Playhouse | Seema Sueko | |
| 2016 | Maybe Happy Ending | Claire | New World Stages | Noah Himmelstein | |
| 2016 | The Remarkable Journey of Prince Jen | Voyaging Moon | Manhattan Theatre Club | Brian Hill | |
| 2017 | Sunday in the Park with George | Celeste #1/Theresa u/s Dot/Marie | Hudson Theatre† | Sarna Lapine | |
| 2017 | Hood: The Robin Hood Musical Adventure | Marian | Dallas Theater Center | Douglas Carter Beane | |
| 2017 | KPOP | MwE | Ars Nova | Teddy Bergman | |
| 2017 | Mean Girls | Gretchen Wieners | National Theatre (out-of-town tryout) | Casey Nicholaw | |
| 2018–19 | Mean Girls | Gretchen Wieners | August Wilson Theatre† | Casey Nicholaw | |
| 2019 | Lady in the Dark | Miss Foster/Sutton | New York City Center | Ted Sperling | |
| 2019–20 | Grand Horizons | Jess | Hayes Theater† | Leigh Silverman | |
| 2021 | Ratatouille the Musical | Colette Tatou | Benefit concert | Lucy Moss | |
| 2023 | Gutenberg! The Musical! | Producer (One night cameo) | James Earl Jones Theatre† | Alex Timbers | |
| 2025 | All Out: Comedy About Ambition | Various | Nederlander Theatre† | Alex Timbers | |

† indicates a Broadway production

== Filmography ==
=== Film ===
| Year | Title | Role | Notes | Ref. |
|---|---|---|---|---|
| 2012 | The V Card | Jessica | | |
| 2014 | Are You Joking? | Date | | |
| 2022 | Mr. Malcolm's List | Gertie Covington | | |
| 2023 | Joy Ride | Audrey Sullivan | | |
| 2024 | Mean Girls | Madame Park | | |
| 2025 | Couples Weekend | Melanie | | |
| 2026 | Basic | Gloria | | |
| 2027 | Ice Age: Boiling Point | Zee | Voice | |
| TBA | Babies | | Post-production | |
| TBA | White Elephant | | Post-production | |

=== Television ===
| Year | Title | Role | Notes | Ref. |
|---|---|---|---|---|
| 2014 | My Dirty Little Secret | Ann Racz | 1 episode | |
| 2017 | Nightcap | Olivia Cho | 8 episodes | |
| 2018 | Saturday Night Live | Herself (uncredited) | Episode: "Tina Fey/Nicki Minaj" | |
| 2019 | Tales of the City | Jennifer 'Ani' Winter | 7 episodes | |
| 2019 | Helpsters | Singing Starlett | Episode: "Singing Starlett / Heart's Family Photo" | |
| 2019 | Untitled ABC project | Winnie | Unaired pilot | |
| 2020–present | Emily in Paris | Mindy Chen | Main cast; 50 episodes | |
| 2021–24 | Girls5eva | Ashley | Recurring role | |
| 2023 | Beef | Naomi | Recurring role | |
| 2023 | Star Wars: Visions | Ara (voice) | Episode: "Journey to the Dark Head" | |
| 2023 | Only Murders in the Building | Kimber Min | Recurring role | |
| 2024 | Dinner Time Live with David Chang | Herself (guest) | Episode: "Fish on the Menu" | |
| 2024 | Krapopolis | Maya (voice) | Episode: "National Lampoon's The Odyssey!" | |
| 2026 | The Bad Guys: The Series | Vanna Tee (voice) | Episode: "Bad Actors" | |

=== Music video appearances ===
| Year | Title | Role | Artist | Ref. |
|---|---|---|---|---|
| 2012 | "Human" | Statue | Charlene Kaye | |

== Discography ==
=== Cast recordings ===
- The King and I - 2015 Broadway Cast Recording (2015)
- Sunday in the Park with George - 2017 Broadway Cast Recording (2017)
- The Greatest Showman - Original Motion Picture Soundtrack (2017)
- Mean Girls - Original Broadway Cast Recording (2018)

=== Collaborative projects ===
- Broadway's Carols for a Cure, Volume 17 (2015)
- Broadway's Carols for a Cure, Volume 20 (2018)

=== As featured artist ===
- "Rockin' Around the Pole" by The Hot Elves (for Mean Girls) (2018)

=== Soundtrack appearances ===
- Soundtrack from Emily in Paris (2021) - 5 songs

=== Podcasts ===
- As the Curtain Rises – Kaye Fields (voice acting role)

== Awards and nominations ==
| Year | Award | Category | Nominated work | Result | Ref. |
|---|---|---|---|---|---|
| 2016 | Grammy Awards | Best Musical Theater Album | The King and I | Nominated | |
| 2018 | Drama Desk Awards | Outstanding Actress in a Musical | KPOP | Nominated | |
| 2018 | Lucille Lortel Awards | Outstanding Lead Actress in a Musical | KPOP | Won | |
| 2018 | Drama League Awards | Distinguished Performance | KPOP | Nominated | |
| 2018 | Drama League Awards | Distinguished Performance | Mean Girls | Nominated | |
| 2018 | Tony Awards | Best Featured Actress in a Musical | Mean Girls | Nominated | |
| 2018 | Drama Desk Awards | Outstanding Featured Actress in a Musical | Mean Girls | Nominated | |
| 2018 | Outer Critics Circle Awards | Outstanding Featured Actress in a Musical | Mean Girls | Nominated | |
| 2018 | Chita Rivera Awards for Dance and Choreography | Outstanding Female Dancer in a Broadway Show | Mean Girls | Nominated | |
| 2021 | Critics' Choice Television Awards | Best Supporting Actress in a Comedy Series | Emily in Paris | Nominated | |
| 2021 | MTV Movie & TV Awards | Best Breakthrough Performance | Emily in Paris | Nominated | |
| 2024 | Screen Actors Guild Awards | Outstanding Ensemble in a Comedy Series | Only Murders in the Building | Nominated | |

=== Special honors and awards ===
- 2013 – Willis Patterson Diversity Award
- 2018 – Clarence Derwent Award
- 2019 – Cancer Support Community's Marin Mazzie Award for Empowerment

== See also ==
- Koreans in New York City
