= Stephanie Hsu =

American actress (born 1990)

- Hsu in 2026
- Born: Stephanie Ann Hsu; November 25, 1990 (age 35); Torrance, California, U.S.
- Education: New York University (BFA)
- Occupation: Actress
- Years active: 2010–present

Chinese name
- Traditional Chinese: 許瑋倫
- Simplified Chinese: 许玮伦
Transcriptions
Standard Mandarin
- Hanyu Pinyin: Xǔ Wěilún
- Wade–Giles: Hsu Wei-lun
- IPA: [ɕỳ wèɪ.lwə̌n]

Stephanie Ann Hsu (/ˈʃuː/ SHOO: born November 25, 1990) is an American actress. She received critical acclaim for her dual role as Joy Wang and Jobu Tupaki in the film Everything Everywhere All at Once (2022), which earned her a nomination for the Academy Award for Best Supporting Actress.

On stage she has starred in three Broadway musicals, originating the roles of Christine Canigula in Be More Chill (2015–2019) and Karen the Computer in SpongeBob SquarePants: The Broadway Musical (2016–2017). For her performance as Janet Weiss in Richard O'Brien's The Rocky Horror Show (2026), she was nominated for the Tony Award for Best Actress in a Musical.

On television, Hsu had recurring roles in the Hulu series The Path (2016–2018) and the Amazon Prime series The Marvelous Mrs. Maisel (2019–2023), for which she won the Actor Award for Outstanding Performance by an Ensemble in a Comedy Series. In 2024, she starred in the television series Laid as Ruby Yao.

== Early life and education ==
Hsu was born to a single mother in Torrance, California. Her maternal grandmother had moved from Mainland China to Taiwan to escape the Chinese Civil War. As a teenager, her mother moved to the United States for a better education. She attended Palos Verdes Peninsula High School in Rolling Hills Estates, California. She moved to Brooklyn, New York to pursue theater and graduated from New York University with a BFA in Drama in 2012. At NYU, she was a member of Hammerkatz, the sketch comedy group, through which she occasionally performed with Bowen Yang, and trained at the Tisch’s Experimental Theater Wing where she was mentored by Elizabeth Swados. She also trained with the Atlantic Theater Company in Chelsea, Manhattan.

== Career ==
Stephanie Hsu started as a performer in experimental theater and comedy. From 2013 to 2015, she made regular appearances on the MTV reality comedy series Girl Code. She landed her first recurring television role as Joy Armstrong in the Hulu series The Path. Hsu was called in for the first table reading of The SpongeBob Musical in 2012 to read for Karen, an anthropomorphic computer. She portrayed the character on stage in Chicago in 2016 before making her Broadway debut in 2017.

Hsu originated the main character of Christine Canigula in the first performance of Be More Chill at the regional Two River Theater in Red Bank, New Jersey. She reprised the role in its off-Broadway run at the Pershing Square Signature Center in 2018 and Broadway run at the Lyceum Theatre in 2019. For her performance, she received Lucille Lortel and Drama Desk Award nominations.

Hsu in 2024

In 2019, Hsu joined the recurring cast of The Marvelous Mrs. Maisel, an Amazon Prime series for its third season as Mei Lin. She and the rest of the cast won the 2020 SAG Award for Best Ensemble in a Comedy Series. She starred in the 2020 independent film Asking for It. Her breakthrough role came in 2022 when Hsu co-starred as Joy Wang, the depressed daughter of Michelle Yeoh's character, and as the nihilistic antagonist Jobu Tupaki in A24's Everything Everywhere All at Once., an absurdist comedy drama film. It opened at the 2022 South by Southwest (SXSW) to acclaim, and Hsu's performance was lauded by critics and audiences. She received the Independent Spirit Award for Best Breakthrough Performance and nominations for the Critics' Choice Award, the Screen Actors Guild Award, and the Academy Award for Best Supporting Actress. In June 2023, she was invited to join the Academy as an actor.

Hsu guest starred in the "Escape from Shit Mountain" episode of the first season of the Peacock series Poker Face, which was released in 2023. Later in 2023, she starred in Adele Lim's film Joy Ride. She appeared in an episode of the Disney+ series American Born Chinese, reuniting with fellow Everything Everywhere All at Once costars Yeoh, Ke Huy Quan, and James Hong.

== Personal life ==
Hsu is queer.

== Acting credits ==
=== Film ===
Year	Title	Role	Notes
2010	The Four-Faced Liar	Patron	
2018	Set It Up	Amber	
2020	Asking for It	Jenny	Also executive producer
2021	Shang-Chi and the Legend of the Ten Rings	Soo	
2022	Everything Everywhere All at Once	Joy Wang / Jobu Tupaki	
2023	Shortcomings	Mrs. Wong	Cameo
2023	Joy Ride	Kat Huang	
2023	The Monkey King	Mayor's Wife (voice)	
2023	Leo	Skyler's Mom (voice)	
2024	Dìdi	Kissing Tutorial Instructor	Cameo
2024	The Fall Guy	Alma Milan	
2024	The Wild Robot	Vontra (voice)	
2026	Steps	Margot (voice)	Post-production

=== Television ===
Year	Title	Role	Notes
2013–2015	Girl Code	Herself	56 episodes
2016	Unbreakable Kimmy Schmidt	Protester	Episode: "Kimmy Goes to a Play!"
2016–2018	The Path	Joy Armstrong	19 episodes
2019–2023	The Marvelous Mrs. Maisel	Mei Lin	14 episodes
2020–2021	Awkwafina Is Nora from Queens	Shu Shu	2 episodes
2022	Kung Fu Panda: The Dragon Knight	Zhen	Voice, 3 episodes
2023	Poker Face	Mortimer Bernstein	Episode: "Escape from Shit Mountain"
2023	American Born Chinese	Shiji Niangniang	Episode: "Hot Stuff"
2023	Blue Eye Samurai	Ise	Voice, recurring cast
2024	RuPaul's Drag Race All Stars	Herself (guest judge)	Episode: "The Paint Ball" (season 9)
2024	Kite Man: Hell Yeah!	Golden Glider, Spoiler	Voice, main cast
2024	Laid	Ruby Yao	Main cast; also executive producer
2024–2025	The Second Best Hospital in the Galaxy	Dr. Nak Nak Sleech	Voice, main cast
2025	The Simpsons	Vidalia	Voice, episode: "Thrifty Ways to Thieve Your Mother"
2025	Star Wars: Visions	Crane	Voice; episode: "The Song of Four Wings"
2026	Not Suitable for Work	Chrysanthemum "Chrys" Li	Episode: "The Jawline of Your Dreams"
2026	Dang!	Ruthie Dang	Voice; main cast

=== Stage ===
Year	Title	Role	Notes
2011	Carnival Round the Central Figure		IRT Theater, New York
2013	BYUIOO	Bagheera	The Gym at Judson, New York
2014	Fast Company	Blue	Ensemble Studio Theatre, New York
2015–2019	Be More Chill	Christine Canigula	Two River Theater, Red Bank, New Jersey; Signature Center, Off-Broadway; Lyceum Theatre, Broadway
2016–2017	The SpongeBob Musical	Karen	Chicago; Broadway
2026	The Rocky Horror Show	Janet Weiss	Studio 54, Roundabout Theatre Company, New York

=== Web ===
Year	Title	Role	Notes
2011	BriTANicK	Best Friend	Episode: "Sexual Roleplay"
2012	Jest Originals	Brandy	Episode: "The Best Argument for Birth Control"
2016	Affordable NYC	Cerise	Episode: "The Apartment"
2016	SUBLETS	Tekserv Employee	Episode 4: "Matters of the Heart"
2018	Indoor Boys	Jessica	Episode: "Surprise"
2024	Sucks to Be the Moon	The Sun	Voice; short

== Awards and nominations ==
Year	Award	Category	Work	Result	Ref.
2019	Lucille Lortel Awards	Outstanding Featured Actress in a Musical	Be More Chill	Nominated	
2019	Drama Desk Awards	Outstanding Featured Actress in a Musical	Be More Chill	Nominated	
2020	Actor Awards	Outstanding Ensemble in a Comedy Series	The Marvelous Mrs. Maisel	Won	
2022	Atlanta Film Critics Circle	Best Breakthrough Performer	Everything Everywhere All at Once	Nominated	
2022	Chicago Film Critics Association	Best Supporting Actress	Everything Everywhere All at Once	Nominated	
2022	Chicago Film Critics Association	Most Promising Performer	Everything Everywhere All at Once	Nominated	
2022	Florida Film Critics Circle	Best Supporting Actress	Everything Everywhere All at Once	Nominated	
2022	Florida Film Critics Circle	Pauline Kael Breakout Award	Everything Everywhere All at Once	Nominated	
2022	Greater Western New York Film Critics Association	Best Supporting Actress	Everything Everywhere All at Once	Nominated	
2022	Greater Western New York Film Critics Association	Best Breakthrough Performance	Everything Everywhere All at Once	Won	
2022	Indiana Film Journalists Association	Best Supporting Performance	Everything Everywhere All at Once	Nominated	
2022	North Texas Film Critics Association	Best Supporting Actress	Everything Everywhere All at Once	Nominated	
2022	Online Association of Female Film Critics	Best Supporting Female	Everything Everywhere All at Once	Won	
2022	Philadelphia Film Critics Circle	Best Supporting Actress	Everything Everywhere All at Once	Runner-up	
2022	Philadelphia Film Critics Circle	Best Breakthrough Performance	Everything Everywhere All at Once	Won	
2022	Saturn Awards	Best Supporting Actress	Everything Everywhere All at Once	Nominated	
2022	Southeastern Film Critics Association	Best Supporting Actress	Everything Everywhere All at Once	Runner-up	
2022	UK Film Critics Association	Supporting Actress of the Year	Everything Everywhere All at Once	Won	
2022	Utah Film Critics Association	Best Supporting Actress	Everything Everywhere All at Once	Won	
2022	Washington D.C. Area Film Critics Association	Best Supporting Actress	Everything Everywhere All at Once	Nominated	
2023	AACTA International Awards	Best Supporting Actress	Everything Everywhere All at Once	Nominated	
2023	Academy Awards	Best Supporting Actress	Everything Everywhere All at Once	Nominated	
2023	Alliance of Women Film Journalists	Best Breakthrough Performance	Everything Everywhere All at Once	Nominated	
2023	Austin Film Critics Association	Best Supporting Actress	Everything Everywhere All at Once	Won	
2023	Austin Film Critics Association	Breakthrough Artist Award	Everything Everywhere All at Once	Nominated	
2023	Chicago Indie Critics	Best Supporting Actress	Everything Everywhere All at Once	Nominated	
2023	Chicago Indie Critics	Breakout Artist Award	Everything Everywhere All at Once	Nominated	
2023	Critics Association of Central Florida	Best Supporting Actress	Everything Everywhere All at Once	Runner-up	
2023	Critics' Choice Movie Awards	Best Supporting Actress	Everything Everywhere All at Once	Nominated	
2023	Denver Film Critics Society	Best Supporting Actress	Everything Everywhere All at Once	Won	
2023	DiscussingFilm Critics Awards	Best Supporting Actress	Everything Everywhere All at Once	Won	
2023	DiscussingFilm Critics Awards	Best Breakthrough Performance	Everything Everywhere All at Once	Won	
2023	Dorian Awards	Best Supporting Performance	Everything Everywhere All at Once	Nominated	
2023	Dorian Awards	Rising Star of the Year	Everything Everywhere All at Once	Won	
2023	Georgia Film Critics Association	Best Supporting Actress	Everything Everywhere All at Once	Won	
2023	Georgia Film Critics Association	Breakthrough Award	Everything Everywhere All at Once	Won	
2023	Hawaii Film Critics Society	Best Supporting Actress	Everything Everywhere All at Once	Nominated	
2023	Hollywood Film Critics Association	Best Supporting Actress	Everything Everywhere All at Once	Nominated	
2023	Houston Film Critics Society	Best Supporting Actress	Everything Everywhere All at Once	Nominated	
2023	Independent Spirit Awards	Best Breakthrough Performance	Everything Everywhere All at Once	Won	
2023	Iowa Film Critics Association	Best Supporting Actress	Everything Everywhere All at Once	Runner-up	
2023	Kansas City Film Critics Circle	Best Supporting Actress	Everything Everywhere All at Once	Runner-up	
2023	Latino Entertainment Journalists Association	Best Supporting Actress	Everything Everywhere All at Once	Won	
2023	Minnesota Film Critics Alliance	Best Supporting Actress	Everything Everywhere All at Once	Nominated	
2023	North Carolina Film Critics Association	Best Supporting Actress	Everything Everywhere All at Once	Won	
2023	North Carolina Film Critics Association	Best Breakthrough Performance	Everything Everywhere All at Once	Nominated	
2023	Online Film and Television Association	Best Supporting Actress	Everything Everywhere All at Once	Won	
2023	Online Film and Television Association	Best Breakthrough Female	Everything Everywhere All at Once	Won	
2023	Online Film Critics Society	Best Supporting Actress	Everything Everywhere All at Once	Nominated	
2023	Portland Critics Association	Best Supporting Actress	Everything Everywhere All at Once	Won	
2023	San Diego Film Critics Society	Best Supporting Actress	Everything Everywhere All at Once	Runner-up	
2023	Actor Awards	Outstanding Performance by a Female Actor in a Supporting Role	Everything Everywhere All at Once	Nominated	
2023	Actor Awards	Outstanding Performance by a Cast in a Motion Picture	Everything Everywhere All at Once	Won	
2023	Seattle Film Critics Society	Best Supporting Actress	Everything Everywhere All at Once	Nominated	
2023	Toronto Film Critics Association	Best Supporting Actress	Everything Everywhere All at Once	Runner-up	
2023	Vancouver Film Critics Circle	Best Supporting Female Actor	Everything Everywhere All at Once	Nominated	
2026	Drama League Award	Distinguished Performance	The Rocky Horror Show	Nominated	
2026	Drama Desk Award	Outstanding Featured Performance in a Musical	The Rocky Horror Show	Nominated	
2026	Tony Award	Best Actress in a Musical	The Rocky Horror Show	Nominated	
2026	Dorian Award	Outstanding Lead Performance in a Broadway Musical	The Rocky Horror Show	Nominated	

== See also ==
- Asian Americans in arts and entertainment
- Taiwanese Americans in Los Angeles
- List of Academy Award winners and nominees of Asian descent
- List of LGBTQ Academy Award winners and nominees — Confirmed individuals for Best Supporting Actress
- List of actors with Academy Award nominations
