= Sherry Cola =

American comedian and actress

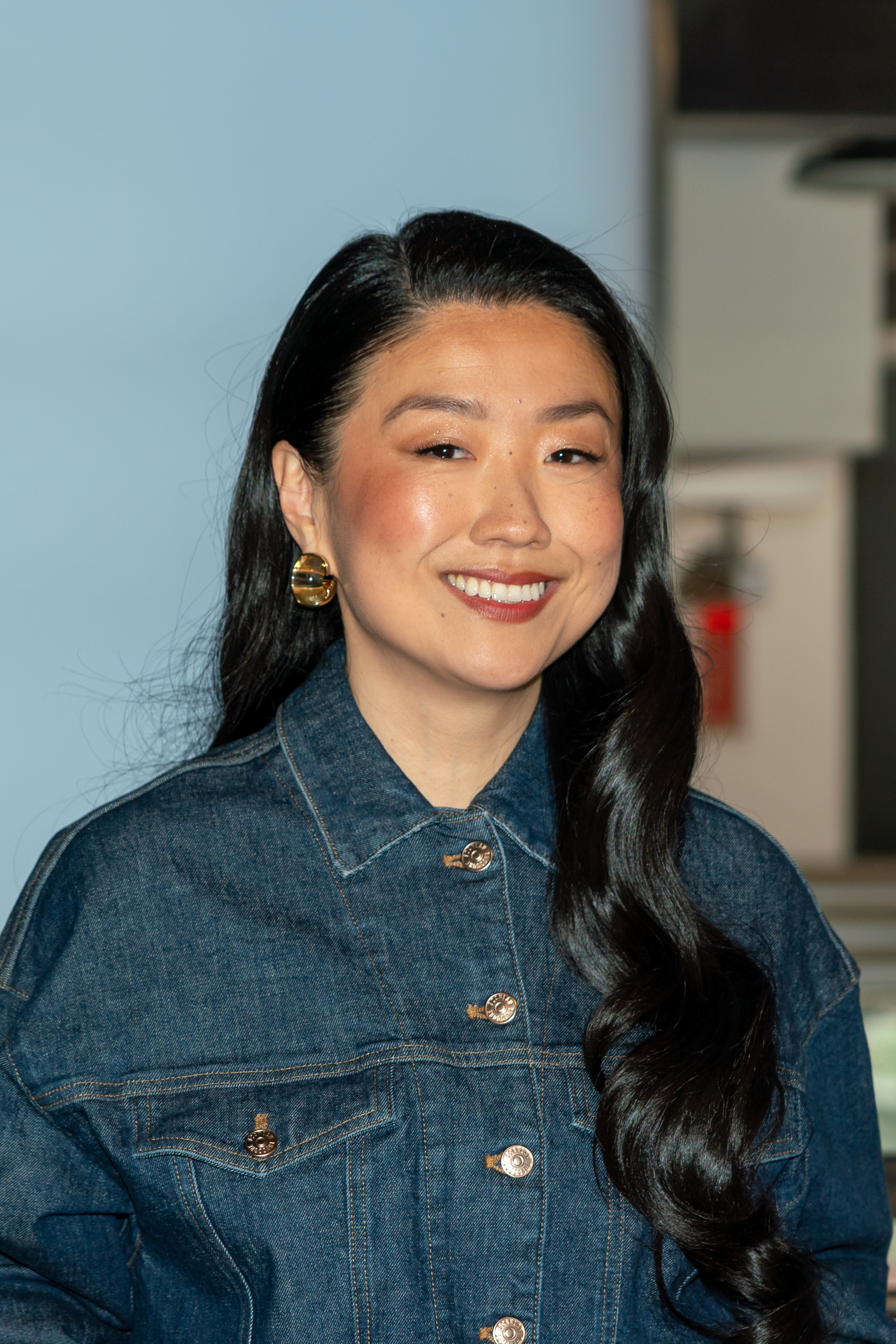
- Cola in 2026
- Born: 1989 or 1990 (age 36–37); Shanghai, China
- Education: CSU Fullerton
- Occupations: Actress; comedian
- Years active: 2017–present

Sherry Cola is an American actress and comedian. Cola began her career in radio and stand-up comedy. She made her acting debut in 2017 on Amazon's I Love Dick. Cola gained recognition for starring as Alice Kwan in the Freeform drama series Good Trouble (2019–2024). After her breakthrough with the 2023 comedies Joy Ride and Shortcomings, Cola has appeared in the Netflix comedies A Family Affair (2024) and Nobody Wants This (2024–present), as well as Shrinking on Apple TV.

== Early life ==
Sherry Cola was born in Shanghai, China and grew up in Temple City, California. Her parents legally changed her first name to Sherry when they came to America. Her parents ran a restaurant in San Gabriel, California.

Cola attended California State University, Fullerton for seven years, saying about that time, "I didn't have my shit together, frankly." At CSU Fullerton, she did campus radio. After graduation, she worked at 97.1 FM in Los Angeles. She majored in communications with an emphasis on entertainment studies.

== Career ==
While Sherry is her first name, "Sherry Cola" is her stage name. It was devised in 2011 as her username for the online food review website Yelp.

During this period, she also created short-form comedic content online, including the recurring character Lil’ Tasty, for the online parody web series, Drive Luber. She hosted comedic segments on AMP Radio, which eventually led to her own show, The BAE Show, at the station. She later began pursuing comedy by taking Upright Citizens Brigade (UCB) classes and doing stand-up comedy.

=== Acting ===
She made her first major television acting appearance in 2017 in the Amazon series I Love Dick, in which she played the recurring role of Natalie. Following this, she expanded into film and television acting, appearing in the romantic drama Endings, Beginnings (2020), directed by Drake Doremus, and in the independent film Sick Girl, which was produced in 2019.

Cola is known for her role as Alice Kwan on the Freeform television series Good Trouble.

Cola has performed stand-up comedy and appeared as an opening act for established comedians, including Ronny Chieng.

She has also worked in voice acting and was cast as one of the lead characters in the animated feature film The Tiger’s Apprentice, produced by Paramount, alongside Sandra Oh and Michelle Yeoh.

After her breakthrough roles in the 2023 comedy films Joy Ride and Shortcomings, Cola appeared in the Netflix romantic comedy film A Family Affair (2024) and the Netflix comedy series Nobody Wants This (2024–present). In April 2025, she joined season 3 of Apple's Shrinking for a recurring role. In 2026, she co-hosted the HGTV series Wild Vacation Rentals with her Nobody Wants This co-star D'Arcy Carden.

== Personal life ==
Cola is bisexual. As of June 2025, she is dating Marisela Zumbado. She served as a Grand Marshal at San Francisco Pride 2022.

== Filmography ==
=== Film ===
Year	Title	Role	Note
2019	Endings, Beginnings	Chris	
2021	Music	Coffee Shop Manager	
2022	Turning Red	Helen (voice)	
2023	Shortcomings	Alice	
2023	Joy Ride	Lolo Chen	
2023	Sick Girl	Laurel	
2024	The Tiger's Apprentice	Naomi (voice)	
2024	Thelma the Unicorn	Female Talent Judge (voice)	
2024	A Family Affair	Stella	
2025	Bride Hard	Nadine	
2025	Freakier Friday	Pickleball Announcer	
2025	Good Fortune	Linda	
2025	You're Dating a Narcissist!	Diane	
2025	The SpongeBob Movie: Search for SquarePants	Studio Spokesperson / Krusty Krab Patron (voice)	
2026	Goat	Hannah (voice)	
2026	Little Brother	Mia	
2026	Bad Day		Completed
TBA	Untitled Stephen Merchant film		Post-production

=== Television ===
Year	Title	Role	Note
2017	I Love Dick	Natalie	Recurring role
2017	Transparent	Improviser #3	Episode: "Groin Anomaly"
2017	Life in Pieces	Cutter	Episode: "Treasure Ride Poker Hearing"
2017	SafeWord	Herself	MTV
2018–2019	Claws	Special Agent Lucy Chun	Recurring role
2019–2024	Good Trouble	Alice Kwan	Main role
2021	Poorly Drawn Lines	The Guardian of The Forest of the Backyard (voice)	Episode: "The Forest of the Backyard"
2022	Baby Shark's Big Show!	Viv (voice)	2 episodes
2023	Transformers: EarthSpark	Cadet Kwan (voice)	2 episodes
2023	Blue Eye Samurai	Kuma (voice)	Episode: "Peculiarities"
2024	American Dad!	Hamster Owner (voice)	Episode: "An Adult Woman"
2024	That '90s Show	Morgan	Episode: "Two Princes"
2024	Primos	Ms. Mahoney (voice)	2 episodes
2024–present	Nobody Wants This	Ashley	Recurring role
2025	Grimsburg	Charlotte Kang (voice)	Episode: "Granddaddy Issues"
2025	Poker Face	Paige	Episode: "Last Looks"
2025	Long Story Short	Veronica (voice)	Episode: "Kendra's Job"
2025	Solar Opposites	Mary (voice)	Episode: "The Realm of Satin and Swords"
2025	Krapopolis	Ali (voice)	Episode: "Society of Swords"
2026	Camp Rock 3	Lark	Television film
2026	Shrinking	Maya	Recurring role
2027	Hidden Heroes: A Descendants Story	Yzma	Television film
