= Meanness =

Personal quality characterized as a vice of "lowness" or cruelty

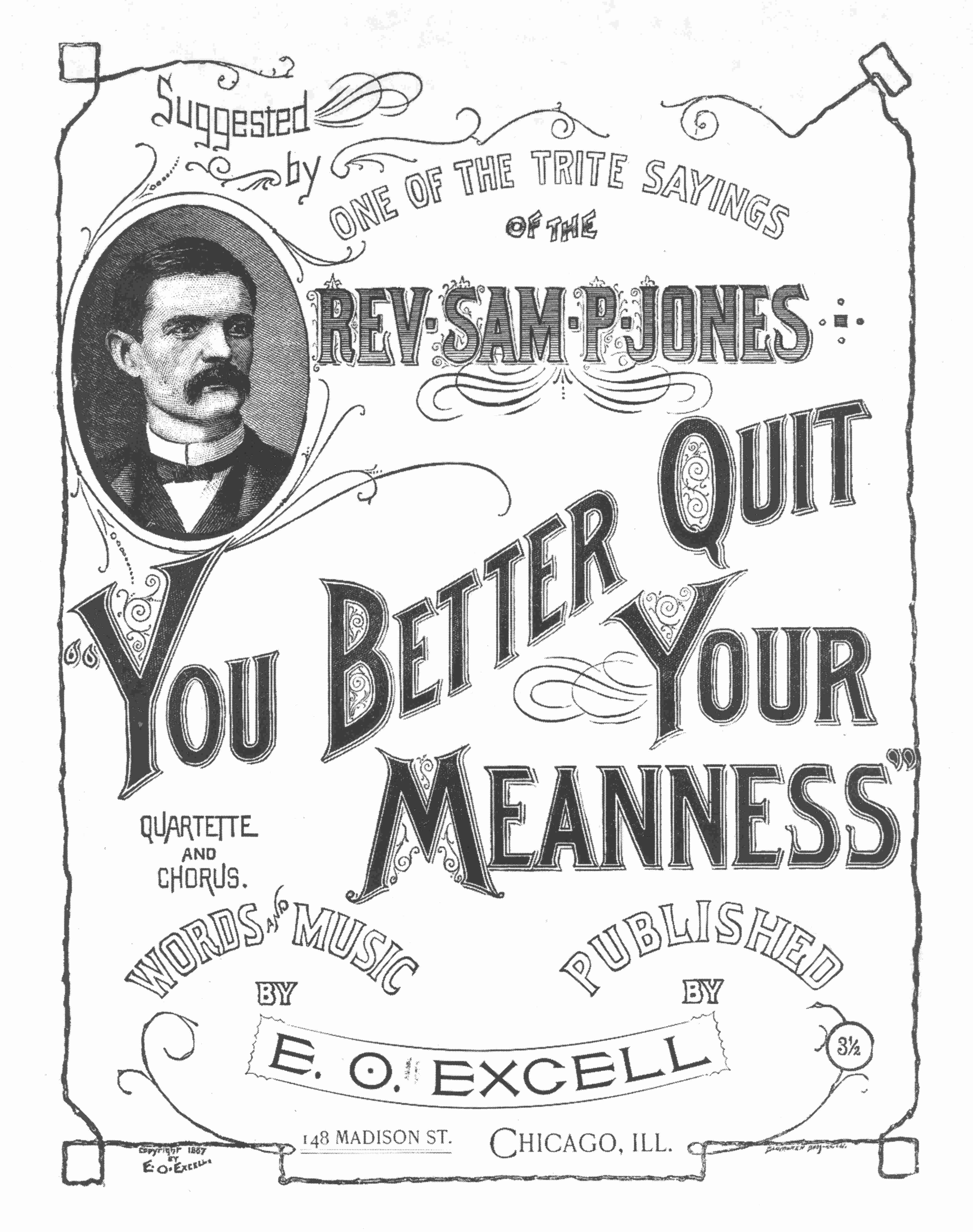
Revivalist preacher Sam Jones coined the slogan "Quit Your Meanness" which was put to music by E. O. Excell.

Meanness is a personal quality whose classical form, discussed by many from Aristotle to Thomas Aquinas, characterizes it as a vice of "lowness", but whose modern form deals more with cruelty.

== Classical formulation ==
In his dictionary, Noah Webster defined meanness as "want of excellence", "want of rank", "low estate", "lowness of mind", and "sordidness, niggardliness, opposed to liberality or charitableness" pointing out that "meanness is very different from frugality". These, in particular the final one, largely summarize the aspects of the classical definition of meanness that have been propounded by philosophers, Aristotelian and otherwise, over the centuries.

=== Aristotle ===
In his Nicomachean Ethics, where each virtue is considered as a midway point on a continuum bracketed by two vices, Aristotle places meanness as one of the two vices that bracket the virtue of liberality/generosity. It is the deficiency of giving to or the excess of taking from others. The other vice is prodigality (excess of giving to or deficiency of taking from), which Aristotle describes as both less common than meanness and less of a vice.

Meanness can take many forms, as there are several ways in which one can deviate from the liberal/generous virtue. It can be a desire for wealth with insufficient desire to benefit others; or a desire to benefit others suppressed by an excessive desire to keep what money one has; or the desire for too much wealth. Aristotle said that "meanness we always impute to those who care more than they ought for wealth" and "there seem to be many kinds of meanness".

The translation of what Aristotle meant is not without problems. Aristotle's actual word ἐλευθερία (eleutheria) corresponds with both liberality and freedom. Its opposite, ανἐλευθερία, is both meanness and servility. Philosophers such as Susanne E. Foster (in Foster 1997) have attempted to reconcile these by explaining that the connotation is that meanness is enslavement by one's material possessions. A slave has no possessions to give and is not the recipient of gifts from others; whereas a free person, in a gift-exchanging culture, can give and take freely. Meanness, therefore, is the vice of a free person behaving, in such a culture, as a slave does.

Another problem that has taxed philosophers analysing Aristotle is that the expected continuum (on which vices and a virtue lie) is from excess to deficiency; but Aristotle describes meanness as both excess (of taking from) and deficiency (of giving to). Philosophers have attempted to explain this, and characterize what Aristotle was trying to say as an excess or a deficiency in some other form. Howard J. Curzer takes the view that in fact both were meant, and that it is "misguided" to ask whether Aristotelian meanness is excess or deficiency, because what constitutes excess and what constitutes deficiency "depends upon how the parameters are described" and is "purely a verbal matter". Exactly which vice of the two that brackets a virtue is "excess" and which is "deficiency" is entirely arbitrary.

Curzer also contends that Aristotle's statement that meanness is worse than prodigality is "a mistake", based upon an erroneous choice of exemplars of prodigality. There are, in Curzer's contention "true prodigals", who are not merely young and foolish (as Aristotle would have prodigals be, and arguing thereby that youth and foolishness are curable — the former by simple dint of growing old — whereas meanness is not) but "incurably wicked" and thus more proper exemplars of the vice, who demonstrate that it is just as much of a vice as meanness is.

=== Aquinas ===
In his Summa Theologica (Aquinas, question 135), Thomas Aquinas explicitly cited Aristotle (as "The Philosopher") and held meanness — parvificentia in his original Latin — to be the opposite of magnificence (magnificentia). Whilst a magnificent person is willing to pay for great projects and good causes, a mean person focuses upon penny-pinching and settles for small goals at the expense of great ones.

=== Others ===
Theodore Parker, like Aristotle, opposed meanness and generosity, declaring meanness as an "unmanly and unwomanly vice". He differentiated two forms of meanness: pecuniary meanness, which is meanness in things measurable with money, and meanness of behaviour, which is meanness in things not thus measurable.

George Crabb described meanness as "[w]hatever a man does in common with those below him" and that "evinces a temper that is prone to sink rather than rise in the scale of society". He considered meanness to be only relatively bad, as what may constitute meanness for one person may be generosity or prudence for another. Seeking to save or to gain for oneself at the expense of others, in particular with respect to what one can afford to pay, "is denominated a mean temper".

Henry Sidgwick in The Methods of Ethics held meanness to be both the opposite of liberality and generosity. A mean person "chooses a trifling gain to himself rather than the avoidance of disappointment to others", and meanness is not injustice per se.

== Modern view as cruelty ==
Samuel Johnson wrote in The False Alarm that "[a]n infallible characteristic of meanness is cruelty". Linda Zagzebski stated that meanness is "an acquired defect" that is "opposed to kindness". These signify the modern view of meanness, which has concentrated upon cruelty, bullying, and remorselessness.

In the Triarchic Psychopathy Measure, one of the several ways of defining what psychopathy is, meanness is one of the three components, an index of a person's "callous aggression". It is characterized as callous unemotionality, antagonism, coldheartedness, exploitativeness, remorselessness, and empowerment through cruelty; encompassing destructive acts, the inability to bond with other people, bullying, fight-picking, and other forms of active engagement against other people (in contrast to social withdrawal, which is a passive moving away from other people).

=== "Mean girls" ===
Many of these aspects of meanness — namely empowerment, bullying, aggression, cruelty, and ruthlessness — have been incorporated in the late 20th and early 21st century popular cultural concept of the "mean girl". Social science professor Valerie Walkerdine argues that "meanness is becoming a dominant motif for Western girlhood", as it fits well with the normative, repressive, boundaries of what is appropriate to modern femininity in work and school, and supports the narrative that empowered, successful, females cannot treat empowerment and success positively, but rather always risk slipping into cruelty. Sociology professor Jessica Ringrose contends that the "mean girl" stereotype from popular culture, as supported by what she criticises as "highly suspect" research in developmental psychology, is being increasingly taken up by policy makers in education. And that in turn, with popular media like the 2004 film Mean Girls being partly based upon the self-help book Queen Bees and Wannabes by Rosalind Wiseman, feeds from psychology and pedagogy back into popular culture.

== See also ==
- Schadenfreude
- Kindness
