= Slut-shaming =

Criticism of people who break sexual norms

Slut-shaming is the practice of criticizing individuals, particularly but not exclusively women and girls, who violate expectations of behavior and appearance regarding issues related to sexuality. It may also be used in reference to gay men, who may face disapproval for promiscuous sexual behaviors. Gender-based violence primarily affecting women can be a result of slut-shaming. The term gained widespread prominence through the SlutWalk movement as a means of reclaiming the word slut and empowering women to have agency over their sexuality.

Examples of slut-shaming include criticism or punishment for: violating dress code policies by dressing in sexually provocative ways; requesting access to birth control; having premarital, extramarital, casual, or promiscuous sex; or engaging in prostitution or other sex work. It can also include being victim-blamed for being subjected to unlawfully forced sexual intercourse or otherwise sexually assaulted.

== Definitions and characteristics ==
Slut-shaming involves criticizing women for their transgression of accepted codes of sexual conduct, i.e., admonishing them for behavior, attire or desires that are more sexual than society finds acceptable. Author Jessalynn Keller stated, "The phrase [slut-shaming] became popularized alongside the SlutWalk marches and functions similarly to the 'War on Women,' producing affective connections while additionally working to reclaim the word 'slut' as a source of power and agency for girls and women."

Slut-shaming may be practiced by men and women. One study found women slut-shamed more than men. Women who slut-shame other women continuously apply unfavorable sexual double standards. The term is also used to describe victim blaming for rape and other sexual assault. This blaming is done by stating the crime was caused (either in part or in full) by the woman wearing revealing clothing or acting in a sexually provocative manner, before refusing consent to sex, thereby absolving the perpetrator of guilt. Sexually permissive individuals can be at risk of social isolation.

A 2003 review of 30 studies by Mary Crawford and Danielle Popp found evidence of sexual double standards. The researchers also found that these standards can vary depending on factors such as age, relationship commitment, number of sexual partners, and cultural background.

A 2016 study by Kreager and colleagues found that adolescent girls who reported having sex experienced decreases in peer acceptance, while boys experienced increases. The opposite pattern was found for making out, with girls experiencing increases in peer acceptance and boys experiencing decreases.

The action of slut-shaming can be a form of social punishment, sexism, and female intrasexual competition for social status. Slut-shaming is a form of intrasexual competition because the term "slut" reduces the value of a woman. Being termed a "slut" is against a woman's gender roles. Women violating gendered dating norms have been shamed as desperate.

Kennair, et al., (2023) found no signs of a sexual double standard in short-term or long-term mating contexts, nor in choosing friends, except that, contrary to expectations, women's self-stimulation was more acceptable than men's.

Researchers from Cornell University found that sentiments similar to slut-shaming appeared in a nonsexual, same-sex friendship context as well. The researchers had college women read a vignette describing an imaginary female peer, "Joan", then rate their feelings about her personality. To one group of women, Joan was described as having two lifetime sexual partners; to another group, she had had 20 partners. The study found that women—even women who were more promiscuous themselves—rated the Joan with 20 partners as "less competent, emotionally stable, warm, and dominant" than the Joan with two.

== History ==
There is no documented date of origin for the term slut-shaming; nor the act of it. Rather, although the act of slut-shaming has existed for centuries, discussion of it has grown out of social and cultural relations and the trespassing of boundaries of what is considered normative and acceptable behavior. While the origin is unknown, by the late 2000s, the term was popular enough to merit usage in newspaper articles. American writer Katha Pollitt, in an article published in March 2008, used the term the following way: “the abstinence only, father-knows-best, slut-shaming crabbed misogyny of the Republican right.”

Before the late 2000s, the term “slutty” was sometimes used to refer to behavior considered to be unacceptable such as the 2000s trend of showing off one’s thong underwear to create a whale tail. In 2005, Suzy Menkes, a veteran journalist covering the fashion industry, considered the act of revealing thongs above one's clothing to be “slutty chic” and hoped that the act would lose popularity.

Literary characters who were punished for their sexual choices include Ophelia of Hamlet (c. 1600); Little Em'ly of David Copperfield (1850); Hester Prynne of The Scarlet Letter (1850); Madame Bovary (1856); Anna Karenina (1878); Daisy Miller (1878); Tess of the d'Urbervilles (1891); Lily Bart of House of Mirth (1905); and Charity Royall in Summer (1917).

In 1892, Canadian writer E. Pauline Johnson criticized the 1887 novel An Algonquin Maiden for killing its protagonist and having male characters posthumously label her a "squaw," a racial and sexual slur that displayed "glaring accusations against her virtue," which Johnson felt was undeserved.

Beginning in the 1960s, second-wave feminism contributed significantly to the definition and act of slut-shaming. Tracing back to the Industrial Revolution and the Second World War, men made up a majority of the labor force while women were socialized and taught to embrace the cult of domesticity and homemaking. Author Emily Poole argues that the sexual revolution of the 1960s and 1970s increased the rate of both birth control use and premarital sex. Moreover, feminist writers during the 1960s and 1970s such as Betty Friedan, Gloria Steinem, and Kate Millett encouraged women to be more open about their sexuality in public settings.

Slut-shaming has correlation to an individual's socio-economic status, which is characterized by wealth, education, and occupation. In the 18th century, "slut" was a common term used by men and upper-class women to degrade lower-class female servants. The context behind upper-class women and men calling their servants a "slut" includes when the servants were being sexually assaulted by their male employers.

=== The Internet ===
Slut-shaming is prevalent on social media platforms, including the most commonly used: YouTube, Instagram, Twitter, and Facebook. Slut-shaming has occurred on Facebook in controversial exchanges between users that have resulted in convictions to menace, harass and cause offense.

In 2014, The Pew Research Center reported the most common targets of harassment on the Internet are often young women. Citing that 50% of young female respondents have been called offensive names and or shamed online. In particular, those who were 18 to 24 years of age experienced varying amounts of severe harassment at astoundingly high rates. Women who have been stalked online were at 26%, while the targets of online sexual harassment were at 25%.

In the Women Studies International Forum, researcher Jessica Megarry used the Twitter hashtag campaign #mencallmethings as a case study of online sexual harassment. Women used the hashtag to report harassment they received from men, including insults related to appearance, name calling, rape threats, and death threats.

==== Media ====
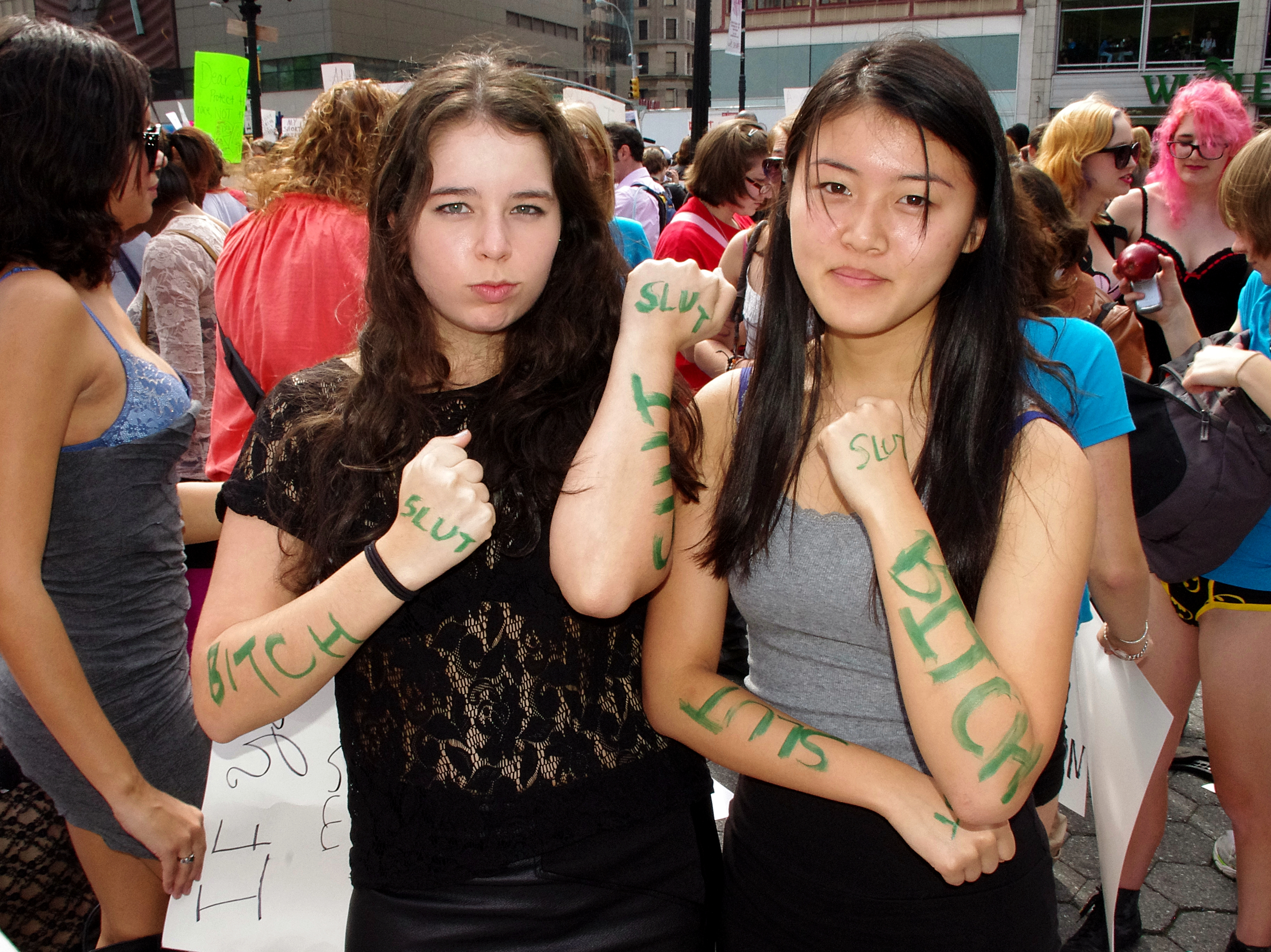
Two women protesting about victim-blaming and slut-shaming at New York City's Slut-Walk in October 2011

In 2011, the Slut-Walk protest march originated in Toronto in response to an incident when a Toronto Police officer told a group of students that they could avoid sexual assault by not dressing like "'sluts'".

Amber Rose's second annual walk in Los Angeles in 2016 had "several hundred" participants. A similar event occurred in Washington DC in 2014.

The Slut Walk movement has embraced the slut-shame label and has engaged in an act of resignification. Ringrose et al. call the Slut Walk a "collective movement" where the focus goes back to the perpetrator and no longer rests on the victim. This act of resignification comes from the work of feminist scholar Judith Butler. In her 1997 work, she argued that labels do not just name and marginalize individuals to categories, but also open up an opportunity for resistance.

Krystal Ball characterized the comments of Rush Limbaugh during the Rush Limbaugh–Sandra Fluke controversy as follows: "If you are a woman who stands up for your rights, you are a slut and your parents should be ashamed of you and we should all have the right to view your sex tapes online. This type of despicable behavior is part and parcel of a time-worn tradition of Slut-Shaming. When women step out line [sic], they are demeaned and degraded into silence. If you say Herman Cain sexually harassed you, you are a slut. If you say Supreme Court Justice Clarence Thomas sexually harassed you, you are a slut."The controversy erupted after Fluke, then a Georgetown Law student, testified before House Democrats in support of a mandate requiring employers to cover contraception in their health insurance plans.

Slut-shaming has been used as a form of bullying on social media, with some people using revenge pornography tactics to spread intimate photos without consent. In 2012, a teenager from California, Audrie Pott, was sexually assaulted by three boys at a party. She committed suicide eight days after photos of her being assaulted were distributed among her peer group.

James Miller, editor-in-chief of the Ludwig von Mises Institute of Canada, wrote a controversial article defending slut shaming. The article was later taken down, but still received criticism from some libertarians, such as Gina Luttrell of Thoughts on Liberty, an all-female libertarian blog.

Comedians Krystyna Hutchinson and Corinne Fischer of Sorry About Last Night host a podcast entitled Guys We Fucked, The Anti-slut shaming podcast. This podcast has over 200,000 listeners on each episode that is on SoundCloud. The podcast exists to de-stigmatize discussing sex so that slut-shaming becomes less of an issue. Hutchinson told The Huffington Post: "We want to make people feel more comfortable in their own skin. We just got a message from a girl from New Delhi, India, about how she loves the podcast because it makes her feel like it's OK to be comfortable with your sexuality and enjoy sex. And that made me so happy".

== Activism ==
Activism against slut-shaming takes place worldwide. Participants have covered their bodies in messages reading "Don't Tell Me How to Dress" and "I am not a slut but I like having consensual sex" and march under a giant banner with the word slut on it. Activism has occurred in Vancouver, New York City, Rio, Jerusalem, Hong Kong, and others.

In 2008, hundreds of South African women protested at the local taxi rank wearing miniskirts and t-shirts that read, "Pissed-Off Women" after a taxi driver and multiple hawkers confronted a young girl about wearing a short denim miniskirt and penetrated her with their fingers, calling her "slut" repeatedly. Protesters wanted to make their message clear; they wanted men to stop harassing women, no matter how short their skirts were and that no matter how short it may be, it is never an invitation.

After the gang rape of an unconscious 16-year-old girl in Steubenville, Ohio, August 2012, football players spread videos of the assault to other classmates, some of whom posted the videos to Twitter and Instagram. The pictures and video were later removed by authorities; however, that did not stop people from hash-tagging "Whore status" or "I have no sympathy for whores" in their tweets. Members of the collective Anonymous reported names of the rapists and classmates who spread the footage to local authorities. They took to the streets and internet requesting help from the community to bring justice to the Jane Doe who was raped.

Members of The Arts Effect All-Girl Theater Company have developed a play, Slut: The Play, in which they address the damaging impact of slut-shaming and slut culture. The creators state that their play "is a call to action – a reminder" that slut-shaming is happening every day, almost everywhere. Slut is inspired by real-life experiences of 14- to 17-year-old girls from New York, New Jersey, Connecticut, and Pennsylvania. The play was shown at the 2013 New York Fringe Festival.

In her statement on the production, and of slut-shaming in general, author of Slut! Growing Up Female with a Bad Reputation, Leora Tanenbaum writes:

A teenage girl today is caught in an impossible situation. She has to project a sexy image and embrace, to some extent, a 'slutty' identity. Otherwise, she risks being mocked as an irrelevant prude. But if her peers decide she has crossed an invisible, constantly shifting boundary and has become too 'slutty,' she loses all credibility. Even if she was coerced into sex, her identity and reputation are taken from her. Indeed, the power to tell her own story is wrested from her. The Arts Effect's SLUT written by Katie Cappiello vividly represents this irrational, harmful, terrible circumstance...This play is the most powerful and authentic representation of the sexual double standard I have ever seen.

After experiencing slut-shaming firsthand, Olivia Melville, Paloma Brierly Newton and approximately a dozen other Australian women founded the organization, Sexual Violence Won't Be Silenced, on August 25, 2015. The association seeks to raise awareness of cyber-bullying and online sexual violence. The founders also launched a petition to the Australian government, requesting that they better train and educate law enforcement officers on how to prevent and punish violent harassment on social media.

== Among gay and bisexual men ==
Gay and bisexual men are also victimized through slut-shaming because of their sexual activity. There has been research supporting that LGBT students were more likely to be bullied and called sluts than heterosexual students. Researchers discussed how these negative experiences of victimization by peers, friends and strangers can lead to physical harm, social shaming, and loss of friendships. Unlike heterosexual people, LGBT people are more likely to learn about safe sex practices from friends. Gay and bisexual men are at highest risk of HIV. Slut-shaming has been cited as an obstacle to men who have sex with men accessing ways to prevent infection by HIV, such as PrEP. The stigmatization and judgment inherent in slut-shaming can discourage men from discussing their sexual practices openly with healthcare providers, thereby inhibiting their willingness to seek out or adhere to preventative treatments like PrEP. Most of the education that young gay and bisexual men receive about safe sex practices is learned from friends, the Internet, hearsay or trial and error.Ultimately, slut-shaming functions not only as a form of social bullying but also as a significant barrier with tangible negative public health consequences for this population.

Criticism of non-heterosexual men's sexual activity can either be said in a humorous context or not. Judgementalism happens when someone mentions gay men's sexual risk behavior or that they have multiple sex partners. This implies that their behavior is "slutty" and dirty.

Street harassment includes cat-calling, victim blaming, and slut-shaming. Judgmentalism is not a pejorative word compared to women, and slut-shaming may have a positive connotation with men depending on context and relationship.

== Among Black women ==
Though slut-shaming affects women from different racial, cultural, and economic backgrounds, Black women are disproportionately affected by the act of slut-shaming. This can be attributed to both misogynoir and historical myths, which have worked together in dictating much of the public perception of Black women. Due to these biases, Black women must stand against more prejudice based on an often false perception of their sexual activity. Furthermore, women from low-income backgrounds are at greater risk of being slut-shamed. Black women experience financial disenfranchisement in comparison to their white peers which in turn adds to the unbalanced nature of the slut-shaming they experience.

Myths about Black women were established and cultivated during the time of slavery and onward to further oppress Black women and justify committing acts of rape and sexual assault against them. One of the myths popularized was the myth of the hyper-sexual Black woman or the Jezebel. This myth, also known as, the myth of promiscuity, popularized the idea that Black women were inherently more sexually charged and deviant than their white counterparts. Black women were determined by the Western world to have a wild, promiscuous nature and immoral, loose, and impure practices and values. This myth was then used as a justification for violating Black women with no consequence.

Furthermore, Black women were forced into sexualized positions regularly, for instance during slave actions they were forcefully stripped of all clothes, and required to be paraded around for the masses, nude. These same involuntary actions would then be spun and used by white society in order to shame Black women and reinforce the ideas created by the myth of promiscuity. This historical projection of insatiable desire onto Black women is widely recognized as the "Jezebel" stereotype, which was culturally deployed to justify sexual violence against them and deny them feminine respectability. This forceful sexualization of Black women only furthered the ideologies prescribed to them by white society in a process of dehumanization and shaming that would be continued throughout history in new, inventive ways.

"Jezebel" still permeates the Black female experience in a myriad of ways. For instance, hip-hop's portrayal of Black women is hypersexualized and deeply stereotypes them both in character and in physicality. Although these ideas were not created by the hip hop/rap industry, they are popularized and reinforced by the overwhelming sexualization of specifically Black women within the music being created today. Hip-hop contributes to the overexposure to slut-shaming experienced by Black women, manifest both verbally through lyrics used and visually through imagery in music videos and album covers. The imagery that accompanies overtly sexual lyrics is often of the stereotypical normative Black female body often adorned in minimal clothing. This imagery of Black femininity is then streamlined into the media to be absorbed by the public, therein altering the public's perception of both the standard Black female body and the behaviors of Black women in general. The effect of this reinforces the public perception that Black women are inherently hypersexual beings.

Yet another contributor to the high rates at which Black women encounter slut-shaming is because of income inequality. Slut-shaming does not permeate high-status circles of women at nearly as high a rate as it does within communities of women that are low-income. This dynamic is often analyzed through the lens of intersectionality, which reveals how overlapping social identities such as being Black and low-income create compounded experiences of discrimination, making these women disproportionately vulnerable to sexual policing. As those individuals coming from the powerful position within the already existing ruling class have the ability to dictate what activities, attire, and body standards are deemed respectable they can remove themselves from experiencing slut-shaming much more readily than their marginalized, low-income, BIPOC counterparts. Furthermore, high-status women often have access to the legal, financial, and media resources necessary to control their public image and mitigate the consequences of shaming, a privilege unavailable to marginalized groups.

== Among lesbian and bisexual women ==
Along with gay and bisexual men, lesbian and bisexual women are also key victims of slut-shaming and bullying. Bisexual women are mainly bullied by other women due to their “open option” choice of preference for both genders.The criticism directed at bisexual women often stems from the heteronormative assumption that their sexuality is inherently destabilizing or greedy, effectively framing their lack of exclusive commitment to one gender as sexual excess a form of slut-shaming based on identity rather than action. However on the other hand, bisexual and lesbian women are fetishized due to the porn industry, and from this fetishizations a group of people would only see them as a “porn category”. The fetishization and objectification of lesbian and bisexual women in pornography further contribute to this shaming by reducing their identities to objects of the male gaze, erasing their genuine agency and relationships outside of this hyper-sexualized context. Lesbian porn is one of the most searched for categories in the porn industry. Lesbian women have struggled with the concept of straight men trying to convert them into a different sexuality.

== See also ==
- Fahisha (Islam)
- Female intrasexual competition
- Free the nipple
- Haya (Islam)
- Honor killing
- Madonna–whore complex
- Post-assault treatment of sexual assault victims
- Sexual bullying
- Victim blaming
