= Grand Army (TV series) =

American teen drama television series

- Genre: Teen drama
- Created by: Katie Cappiello
- Starring: Odessa A'zion; Odley Jean; Amir Bageria; Maliq Johnson; Amalia Yoo; Alphonso Romero Jones, II; Thelonius Serrell-Freed; Anthony Ippolito; Brian Altemus
- Music by: Morgan Kibby
- Country of origin: United States
- Original language: English
- No. of seasons: 1
- No. of episodes: 9

Production
- Executive producers: Katie Cappiello; Nicolette Donen; Elizabeth Kling; Beau Willimon; Jordan Tappis; Joshua Donen
- Producer: Chris Hatcher
- Cinematography: Ava Berkofsky; Bobby Shore; Autumn Eakin; Andrew Wehde
- Editors: JoAnne Yarrow; Fabienne Bouville; Darrel Drinkard; Jon Otazua; Jessica Hernández
- Running time: 47–72 minutes
- Production company: Westward

Original release
- Network: Netflix
- Release: October 16, 2020

Grand Army is an American teen drama television series created by Katie Cappiello that premiered on Netflix on October 16, 2020. It is loosely based on Cappiello's Slut: The Play. In June 2021, the series was canceled after one season.

== Premise ==
This series follows the lives of five teenagers who attend the largest high school in Brooklyn as they navigate a chaotic world, encountering such topics as racism, poverty, rape, drugs, sex, LGBT, and mental health.

== Cast ==
=== Main ===
- Odessa A'zion as Joey Del Marco, a high school junior from Stuyvesant Town who is also on the school's dance team
- Odley Jean as Dominique "Dom" Pierre, a Haitian-American high school junior from East New York who is also on the school's girls basketball team.
- Amir Bageria as Siddhartha "Sid" Pakam, a closeted gay Indian-American high school senior from Jackson Heights who is on the school's swim team
- Maliq Johnson as Jayson Jackson, an African-American high school sophomore from Spanish Harlem
- Amalia Yoo as Leila Kwan Zimmer, a Chinese-American high school freshman from the Upper West Side who was adopted by a Jewish couple when she was a baby
- Alphonso Romero Jones, II as John Ellis, Dom's love interest
- Thelonius Serrell-Freed as Tim Delaney, one of Joey's friends
- Anthony Ippolito as George Wright, one of Joey's friends who is on the Grand Army High School's swim team
- Brian Altemus as Luke Friedman, one of Joey's friends who is on the Grand Army High School's swim team

=== Recurring ===
- Sydney Meyer as Anna Delaney, Joey's best friend and Tim's younger sister
- Keara Graves as Grace, Joey's other best friend who is on the school dance team with her
- Jaden Jordan as Owen Williams, Jayson's best friend
- Brittany Adebumola as Tamika Jones, Dom's best friend who is on the girls basketball team with her
- Naiya Ortiz as Sonia Cruz, Dom's other best friend, also on the girls basketball team with her
- Crystal Nelson as Tor Sampson, Dom's other best friend who is also on the girls basketball team with her
- Ashley Ganger as Meera Pakam, Sid's younger sister
- Marcela Avelina as Flora Mejia, Sid's girlfriend
- Lola Blackman as Rachel Finer, Leila's best friend
- Lindsay Wu as Wendi, Leila's classmate
- Tiffany Tong as Mei, Leila's classmate
- Jennifer Tong as Su, Leila's classmate
- David Iacono as Bo Orlov, Sid's rival teammate
- Micah Solis as Nick Rodriguez
- Diego Martinez-Tau as Chris Yoon
- Cole Bullock as Dante Pierre, Dom's eldest nephew
- Mercedes Slater as Odette Pierre, Dom's niece
- Osias Reid as Tristian Pierre, Dom's younger nephew
- Rachel Boyd as Natalie
- Kelsey Falconer as Christina
- Alex Castillo as Ms. Lisa Gonzalez
- Jason Weinberg as Principal Michael Metta, Grand Army High School's principal
- Katie Griffin as Rebecca Connely, Joey's mother
- August Blanco Rosenstein as Victor Borin, an out bi student college essay tutor who helps Sid and also a classmate
- Magaly Colimon as Antoinette Pierre, Dom's mother
- Rod Wilson as Matt Del Marco, Joey's father
- Ava Preston as Nina Del Marco, Joey's younger sister
- Deanna Interbartolo as Frankie Del Marco, Joey's youngest sister
- Michael Brown as Shawn Jackson, Jayson's father
- Raven Dauda as Nicole Jackson, Jayson's mother
- Geoffrey Pounsett as Mr. Knight, Jayson's music teacher at Grand Army High School
- Lynn Weintraub as Rabbi Sadie Schultz
- Zac Kara as Omar Biller, drama club member and assistant director to Meera's play
- Sagine Sémajuste as Sabine Pierre, Dom's older sister

== Episodes ==
No.	Title	Directed by	Written by	Original release date
1	"Brooklyn, 2020"	So Yong Kim	Katie Cappiello	October 16, 2020
A terrorist bombing outside Grand Army High School forces all the students to lock down in the school. To tease Dominique, Owen takes her wallet out of her bag and his friend Jay tosses it around, accidentally losing her money in the process. Meanwhile, Sid consoles Leila after she was bullied, and Joey is reprimanded for violating the school’s dress code. At a party, Sid attempts to have sex with his girlfriend but is psyched out and does not. Joey hangs out with Tim to blow off steam.
2	"See Me"	So Yong Kim	Katie Cappiello	October 16, 2020
Joey rallies the school in a free the nipple protest after being admonished the day before. Sid meets up with a fellow student, Victor, to revise his personal essay and is distracted by Victor's appearance. He goes home to masturbate to gay porn. Leila awkwardly hooks up with another student, George. Dominique has trouble paying for her family’s groceries and feels awkward when her crush John Ellis offers to help her pay for them. Jayson and Owen are reprimanded for stealing Dominique’s wallet; Jayson is suspended for a week, while Owen receives a superintendent’s suspension and a hearing as he was directly responsible for taking the wallet out of the bag.
3	"Relationship Goals"	Darnell Martin	Katie Cappiello	October 16, 2020
Sid breaks up with his girlfriend, while Leila has a falling-out with her friend, causing her to confide in a rabbi. Joey hangs out with her usual friends, George, Luke, and Tim, though she has a flirtatious relationship with Tim. Tim's sister tells her to not have a relationship with Tim, causing her to try to distance herself from Tim by flirting with the other two. Drunk, Joey is raped by George and Luke while Tim does nothing to stop them.
4	"Safety On"	Darnell Martin	Katie Cappiello	October 16, 2020
Leila auditions for the school play. Dominique enters a relationship with John Ellis, and Jayson learns that his music class is already replacing Owen’s spot. Sid submits his new personal essay; his essay is now about his struggles of being a gay and Indian teenager. He asks his advisor to make sure it is kept secret. At school, Joey is easily irritated, culminating in yelling at Dominique after accidentally hitting her with a basketball. Dominique follows her and finds bruises on her legs. Tim asks if she is okay, and Luke gives her drugs to relax her. When she returns home, she tearfully admits to her mother that she was raped.
5	"Valentine's Day"	Tina Mabry	Hilary Bettis and Katie Cappiello	October 16, 2020
Dominique’s mother suggests marrying someone to solve the family’s financial issues, causing Dominique to try to find more ways to earn more money for her family. Owen receives a 60-day suspension after his hearing, much to Jayson’s guilt. Sid and Flora reunite and have sex. Leila is told by a student, Omar, that she is the understudy for the play, much to her disappointment. Joey goes to a hospital to get a rape kit, and George, Luke, and Tim are questioned. As rumors spread, she tells her therapist that she feels awful accusing her friends and deletes her Instagram account.
6	"Superman This S**t"	Tina Mabry	Randy McKinnon and Katie Cappiello	October 16, 2020
Dominique is busy creating a hair product business and applying for an internship. The rabbi advises Leila to practice accountability, and she hangs out more with Omar. Jayson learns that Owen was picked to play in the All-State Performance but cannot due to being suspended. Jayson feels guilty taking Owen’s spot. Joey cries after seeing George and tells her mother that she wants to disappear. Sid and Victor bond during a science experiment and Victor tells Sid that he is bisexual. At a swim meet, Sid yells at a teammate for disqualifying them and forgets to bring his laptop with him when he leaves. Later that night, he learns that his essay was posted online.
7	"Making Moves"	Silas Howard	Andy Parker	October 16, 2020
Dominique attends her job interview and returns home to her parents preparing for her arranged marriage. Leila attempts to reconcile with the people in her life but is unsuccessful. Jayson suggests that the school host a sit-in in protest of Owen’s suspension. Joey is moved to an all-girls school so she can be in a new environment. She is angry after she learns that the rape charges on George and Luke were not being moved forward due to lack of evidence. Sid accuses his advisor and Victor for leaking his essay, but they both deny it. He realizes that it was actually his teammate who did it and punches him, but he attacks back. At the hospital, Sid comes out to his father, who refuses to believe that Sid is gay.
8	"Spirit Day"	Silas Howard	Ming Peiffer and Lewaa Nasserdeen and Katie Cappiello & Alessandra Clark	October 16, 2020
9	"Freedom"	Clement Virgo	Katie Cappiello	October 16, 2020
Angry at losing her part in the play, Leila sends a fake bomb threat to the school. The sit-in protest against racism is interrupted when the school is evacuated, prompting Jayson to consider a stronger way to protest Owen's suspension. Sid learns that he was accepted to Harvard and kisses Victor in joy. Dominique's family cancels the arranged marriage after seeing her hanging out with her friends, saying that she deserves to marry someone she loves. Dominique asks John to prom and he accepts. At Joey's new school, another student confides in her that she was raped as well but did not report it, and that she admires her bravery. She meets up with Tim, George, and Luke hoping that they would at least admit that they raped her, but they all deny it. When she leaves, Tim breaks his silence and yells at his friends. Joey energetically participates in an intense dance class, ignoring Tim's texts asking if she is okay. At Jayson's All-State Performance, he covers his mouth with black tape and raises his hand in silence.

== Production ==
=== Development ===
It was announced in October 2019 that Netflix had ordered a 10-episode adaptation of Katie Cappiello's 2013 play, one that expands on the original work. The storylines are based on real life stories from her students. On June 17, 2021, Netflix canceled the series after one season.

=== Controversy ===
On the day of the teaser release, writer Ming Peiffer stated on Twitter that she and two other writers of color had quit the project, citing racist exploitation and abuse allegations against one of the creators.

=== Casting ===
It was announced Odessa A'zion would play Joey Del Marco and Amalia Yoo would reprise her role from the stage production as Leila Kwan Zimmer. Also joining the main cast are Maliq Johnson, Amir Bageria, and Odley Jean.

=== Filming ===
Principal photography took place in both Toronto and New York City from May to September 2019, with most indoor scenes in Toronto and most outdoor and subway scenes in New York City.

== Release ==
The teaser was released as well as first look images in September 2020, followed by a full trailer in October. Fahamu Pecou painted the promotional artwork for the posters. The series premiered on October 16, 2020 with 9 episodes instead of the original order of 10 episodes.

== Reception ==
For the series, review aggregator Rotten Tomatoes reported an approval rating of 71% based on 14 reviews, with an average rating of 7.34/10. The website's critics consensus reads, "Grand Army is an excellent showcase for its exciting cast of newcomers—even if its attempt at an honest approach to adolescence is too overwrought to make an impact." Metacritic gave the series a weighted average score of 68 out of 100 based on 12 reviews, indicating "generally favorable reviews". In 2021, Ashley Ganger gave an interview for Vanity Teen magazine, following her appearance on the series, talking about her personal journey and the social influence of the series.

Kristen Baldwin of Entertainment Weekly gave the series a B− and described the series as "ambitious, often to a fault. Still, there are flashes of beauty—let me say again, Odley Jean is a revelation—amid the gritty teen boilerplate." Reviewing the series for Rolling Stone, Alan Sepinwall gave it 4 out of 5 stars and said, "In its best moments, Grand Army enters rare air for high school shows, elevating surprisingly close to the genre's thoughtful standard-bearer, My So-Called Life."
