= Katie Cappiello =

American dramatist

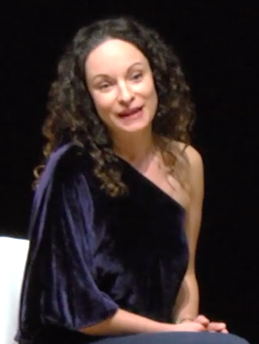
- Katie Cappiello in 2017 at the Brooklyn Museum
- Born: Katherine Cappiello; Brockton, Massachusetts
- Education: New York University
- Occupation: Playwright

Katherine "Katie" Cappiello is an American playwright, director, feminist, teacher, activist and public speaker best known for her plays Slut and Now That We're Men. Gloria Steinem called Slut "truthful, raw and immediate!" and David Remnick, editor of The New Yorker called it "vital, moving, and absolutely necessary". Cappiello is the creator, writer and executive producer of Grand Army.

== Early life and education ==
Katie Cappiello was born in Brockton, Massachusetts to Mike and Jane Cappiello, both retired public school teachers.

Cappiello attended Brockton High School in Massachusetts, where she graduated in 1999. She received a Bachelor of Fine Arts in Theater at New York University's Tisch School of the Arts with concentrations in Political Science. She trained at the Lee Strasberg Theatre and Film Institute, where she learned method acting and eventually served as head teacher of the Young Actors Program at the institute.

== Career ==
Cappiello launched The PossEble Theater Company in 2005, a theater company whose profits from productions were donated to building theater programming in public elementary schools. In 2007, Cappiello co-founded The Arts Effect NYC, a dramatic arts school, with Meg McInerney. Currently, Cappiello runs and teaches at her company, GoodCapp Arts, a theater arts production company and training studio for young artists.

=== Plays ===
==== SLUT ====
SLUT follows the journey of a 16-year-old girl, Joey Del Marco, who is raped by three of her friends. It explores the brutally honest reality and damaging impact of bullying rape culture and slut-shaming.

Cappiello first wrote and directed the play SLUT in 2013. It premiered at the 2013 New York International Fringe Festival, where it received an encore performance. In 2014, SLUT was produced at the Hammer Museum in Los Angeles, CA; and at the ECCE Arts Gallery in Fargo, North Dakota. In 2015, performances were held at The Tischman Auditorium at New York City's The New School.; and at the Wong Auditorium and the Kresge Auditorium at the Massachusetts Institute of Technology Also in 2015, a performance of SLUT was held at the Warner Theatre in Washington, D.C.; the talkback following the performances featured guests including editor-in-chief of Glamour Magazine Cynthia Leive, Senator Kirsten Gillibrand, House of Cards creator Beau Willimon and Senator Mark Warner. In 2017, the play was produced as a fundraiser for Planned Parenthood, the ACLU and the Southern Poverty Law Center at Teatro LATEA in New York City, along with Cappiello's play Now That We're Men. In 2018, SLUT was produced at WNYC's The Greene Space in New York City. The play was also performed at various schools throughout the United States, such as Choate Rosemary Hall, Phillips Academy Andover.; and the St. Paul's School in New Hampshire The acting edition for SLUT as well as SLUT: A Play and Guidebook for Combating Sexism and Sexual Violence were published by The Feminist Press in 2015.

==== Now That We're Men ====
Cappiello is also the playwright for the play Now That We're Men. The play was produced at Dixon Place in New York City in 2016. In April 2018, it was produced at The Steppenwolf Theatre in Chicago, Illinois and at WNYC's The Greene Space in New York City. The play was produced at schools such as Choate Rosemary Hall, St. Francis College, and Phillips Academy Andover.

Now That We're Men follows five teenage boys in the weeks before prom. It explores consent, pornography, "manning up", and sex in the lives of boys and young men.

In 2013, Cappiello wrote and directed A Day in the Life, a play which explores the lives of teenage girls who have been victimized by commercial sexual trafficking. The play has been produced at various conferences and events at venues such as the 58th session of the United Nations Commission on the Status of Women; The Make Equality Reality Gala in Beverly Hills, California; the Paley Center for Media in New York City; and the 2017 Annual Child Welfare Law Update in Honolulu, HI.

==== Her Story ====
Cappiello's play Her Story, Uncut was presented at The United Nations in 2016; the United States Institute of Peace's End Violence Against Girls SUMMIT on FGM/C; and at the Make Equality Reality Gala in 2016 in Los Angeles, California. Her Story, Uncut explores the issue of female genital mutilation. In 2017, Cappiello wrote and directed After 18, which explores the lives of women who were trafficked as children. A performance of the piece in New York featured cast members from the series Orange Is the New Black, including Elizabeth Rodriguez and Lori Tan Chinn as well as Julia Goldani Telles from the series The Affair. In 2017, Cappiello wrote and directed JOY, which was presented at the New York FRIDGE Festival. The play explores purity and the sexual lives of a repressed, isolated Christian community. In 2011, Cappiello wrote and directed Facebook Me, which premiered at Teatro SEA in New York City. It also performed at the DR2 Theatre New York City. It explores social media and its influences on the lives of 13-15-year-old girls. Katie wrote and directed Keep Your Eyes Open in 2008, which premiered at the Cherry Lane Theatre. It won the 2008 Fringe Festival's Outstanding Ensemble Award. The play explores the lives of young schoolgirls. In 2018, Cappiello wrote One Click Away, which premiered at the Brooklyn Historical Society - the piece explores online sex trafficking.

=== Public speaking ===
Cappiello has been a guest speaker at events such as the National Museum of Women in the Arts's FRESH TALKS; The Brooklyn Museum's Brooklyn Conference; and Talks at Google.

=== Workshops ===
Cappiello created workshops for the StopSlut movement, a "youth-led anti-sexual bullying movement". She co-created and facilitated Project Impact, "a leadership-through-storytelling workshop for youth trafficking survivors". She has been invited to lead workshops at the ChiTeen Lit Fest; the St. Paul's School; and at Choate Rosemary Hall.

=== Honors ===
Cappiello was honored by the National Women's Hall of Fame.

She was named one of New York's New Abolitionists, a group of New Yorkers "united by our commitment to ending human trafficking".

== Personal life ==
Cappiello lives in Brooklyn, New York.
