= Rachel Boyd =

Canadian actress

- Born: August 5, 2001 (age 24); Newmarket, Ontario
- Occupation: Actress
- Years active: 2015–present

Rachel Boyd is a Canadian actress. She is best known for playing Sophia Choi in the soap opera Days of Our Lives and Natalie in the teen drama series Grand Army.

== Early life ==
Boyd was born in Newmarket, Ontario, on August 5, 2001. She recalls that her house growing up only had one TV and that she would race her brother home from the bus stop to see which one would be able to watch it. Before she got into show business she worked as a server at a steakhouse.

== Career ==
Early on in her career she appeared in the films He's Not Worth Dying For and Boot Camp while her first recurring role came as Natalie on the drama series Grand Army. Her first big role came playing Sophia Choi in the soap opera Days of Our Lives. She took over the role from Madelyn Kientz. She got the role while she was still working shift at her job. She was nervous about accepting it due to the character being a pregnant teenager. She starred alongside Brett Geddes in the horror film Sick Puppy.

== Personal life ==
She is of Filipino, Irish and Scottish descent. She is currently living in Los Angeles and says it reminds her of her hometown of Newmarket because there is one strip where there is a bunch of restaurants and everyone likes to hangout there on the weekend and there's a water pond like Fairy Lake.

== Filmography ==
=== Film ===
Year	Title	Role	Notes
2015	The Silence	Child 13	Short
2017	Sneaky	Girll	Short
2019	Shazam!	Senior Girl	
2021	Breaking Any Spell	April	Short
2022	He's Not Worth Dying For	Isla	
2024	Boot Camp	Willow	
2025	Sick Puppy	Mia	

=== Television ===
Year	Title	Role	Notes
2015	Heroes Reborn	Injured Daughter	Episode; 11:53 to Odessa
2019	The Bold Type	Chelsea	Episode; Breaking Through the Noise
2020	Grand Army	Natalie	5 episodes
2025	Days of Our Lives	Sophia Choi	60 episodes
