= Ming Peiffer =

Asian American Writer and Playwright

- Born: 1988
- Education: Colgate University, Columbia University School of the Arts
- Occupations: Writer, playwright
- Website: mingpeiffer.com

Ming Peiffer (born circa 1988) is an Asian American playwright and was the first Asian American woman playwright to be nominated for a Drama Desk Award. She was also a New York Theater Workshop 2050 Fellow and a runner up for the 2016 John F. Kennedy Center for the Performing Arts' Paul Stephen Lim Playwriting Award.

== Education ==
In 2010, Peiffer graduated from Colgate University with a Bachelor's degree in Theater Arts and Mandarin Chinese. In 2016, Peiffer graduated with a master's degree from the Columbia University School of the Arts's playwriting program where she received mentorship under the direction of David Henry Hwang.

== Career ==
In 2016, Peiffer's play i wrote on ur wall and now i regret it came in second place for the Kennedy Center's Paul Stephen Lim Playwriting Award. Peiffer wrote for the 2017 Netflix show Gypsy. Also in 2017, a play Peiffer had written about a half-Korean half-white girl coming of age in 1980s Ohio – Usual Girls - was nominated for The Kilroy's List.

In 2018, Usual Girls was featured in The New York Times Critic's Pick and its run was extended twice at the Roundabout Theater Company. Usual Girls was also nominated for the Drama Desk Award for Outstanding Play in 2019.

Peiffer also wrote for the 2020 Netflix show Locke & Key. On August 18, 2020, "Finish the Fight" – a virtual play written by Peiffer – premiered as part of The New York Times Events. "Finish the Fight" was commissioned by The New York Times for the 19th Amendment centennial. In September 2020, Peiffer tweeted about how she quit writing for Netflix's show Grand Army due to racism.

In 2021, Peiffer's short play about an Asian dominatrix and her white client was featured for the Wrath portion of the 2021 New York iteration of Moisés Kaufman's "Seven Deadly Sins." Ngozi Anyanwu, Thomas Bradshaw, and Bess Wohl were also featured playwrights for that iteration of "Seven Deadly Sins."

In 2022, Peiffer, alongside writers Jihan Crowther, Joanna Castle Miller, Gina Young, Anna Ziegler, and Tyler English-Beckwith, worked on the short play anthology — Keep This Far Apart — which focuses on 6 women's experiences and was directed and filmed by an all-female production team over Zoom due to the COVID-19 pandemic.

== Personal life ==
Peiffer considers being mixed-race to be a strong part of her identity. Her mother is an immigrant from Taiwan and her father is white. She was born in New York and grew up in Columbus, Ohio.
