= Leora Tanenbaum =

American feminist author (b. 1969)

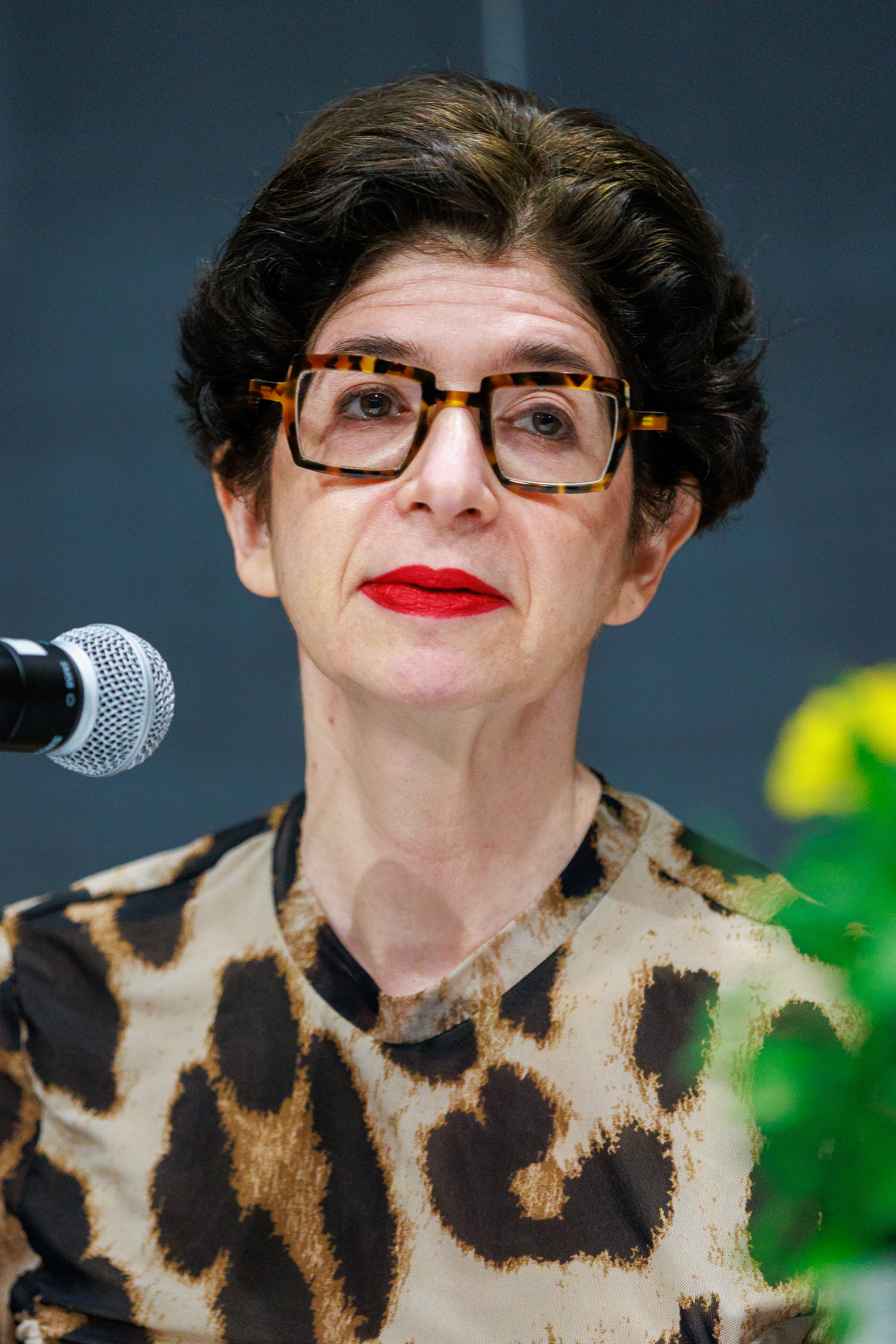
- Born: 1969 (age 56–57)
- Education: Brown University
- Occupations: Author, Editor
- Writing career
- Years active: 1995–present
- Notable works: Slut!: Growing Up Female With a Bad Reputation (1999); Catfight: Rivalries Among Women: From Diets to Dating, From the Boardroom to the Delivery Room (2002)

Leora Tanenbaum is an American feminist author and editor known for her writing about girls' and women's lives. She is credited with coining the term "slut-bashing" in her 1999 book Slut!: Growing Up Female With a Bad Reputation; the concept has since been mostly known as "slut-shaming."

== Career ==
Tanenbaum came to public attention with the publication of her 1999 book Slut!: Growing Up Female With a Bad Reputation. In it, she addresses the use of the word "slut" as a "pejorative, gender-specific noun" usually applied only to women, while words for promiscuous men (e.g. "Casanova", "ladies man", etc.) are generally more approving. The book relates the effect that this double-standard has on girls and women, from the 1950s through the 1990s. In writing it, Tanenbaum drew on her own experiences as a teenager, as well as on interviews with 50 girls and women who had all been labeled as "sluts" in their communities. She found that most of them were not sexually active, but that such name-calling was commonly used as a form of bullying. She reports on a 1993 poll that found that 42 percent of girls "have had sexual rumors spread about them" and said that school systems need to do more to combat this form of harassment. In the book, she coined the phrase "slut-bashing," which she used to describe a "specific form of student-to-student verbal sexual harassment in which a... girl is bullied because of her perceived or actual sexual behavior."

In 2002, Tanenbaum turned to the topic of competition and aggression between women in her book Catfight: Rivalries Among Women: From Diets to Dating, From the Boardroom to the Delivery Room. The book draws on academic research, journalistic reporting, fieldwork, and personal experience. It argues that competition between women arises from and perpetuates gender inequality, and that "competing with other women for limited resources and advantages is one of women's few viable options." Reviewer Andi Zeisler noted that the book was one of several on relational aggression between women that came out the same year, citing also Rachel Simmons' Odd Girl Out, Phyllis Chesler's Woman's Inhumanity to Woman and Emily White's Fast Girls.

Tanenbaum returned to the topic of slut-shaming with her 2015 book I Am Not a Slut: Slut-Shaming in the Age of the Internet. As with Slut!, the book is based on interviews; Tanenbaum's sample for I Am Not a Slut were 55 girls and women, aged 14 to 22 who either had used the word "slut" against others, or who had been the targets of the word. In the book, she describes the tension women and girls experience so as not to be either a "prude" or a "slut", neither too sexual nor insufficiently sexual. Some women see reclaiming the word "slut" as a way of owning their own sexuality, but Tanenbaum argues that the word "slut" is "too dangerous to be reclaimed," and fears that "mass reclamation will trigger a terrible backlash against women."

In her 2009 book Taking Back God: American Women Rising Up for Religious Equality, Tanenbaum writes about women "who are deeply committed to their traditions yet unhappy with limitations placed on women within them," based on interviews with 95 women from five major faith traditions. She identifies four goals shared by a majority of her respondents: for women to have leadership roles in their faith communities, for the language of the liturgy to reflect women's presence, for recognition that women's bodies are "normal and not aberrant", and for women to be recognized as created in the image of God.

In 2019, Tanenbaum launched an Instagram project, @BeingDressCoded, that explores the intersection of slut-shaming and dress codes. She has said that she wanted to "create a space in which we don’t just observe individual stories about dress codes but can look for patterns and learn from a larger, collective story about sexism and sexual objectification."

Tanenbaum previously served as the editor-in-chief at the non-profit organization Catalyst, and worked in communications for Planned Parenthood, among other non-profits. She is also a member of the Pembroke Center Associates Council, the governing body for the Pembroke Center for Teaching and Research on Women at Brown University. She has been a contributing writer for, among other publications, Ms., Teen Vogue, Time, and The New York Times.

Tanenbaum's sixth book, Sexy Selfie Nation: Standing Up for Yourself in Today's Toxic, Sexist Culture, was published in 2025. Exploring young women's motivations to wear body-revealing outfits and share sexually provocative selfies on social media, Tanenbaum interviewed 60 young women and nonbinary people aged 14 to 30. In the book, she attributes these decisions to reactions against a toxic culture, particularly in regard to gendered dress codes, the nonconsensual distribution of their intimate images, and sexualized deepfakes. Booklist praised how Tanenbaum "tackles an immensely important subject with this enlightening, surprising, and thoroughly researched consideration of young women, clothing, and sexual objectification" and that this "work is great in scope but intimate in execution. Outstanding." USA Today claimed the book "presents a roadmap for parents to better understand their children's behaviors, as well as for women and girls to shape and share their image on their own terms and reclaim control over their bodies." Salon noted that Tanenbaum spoke to a "new generation whose responses to living in a hypersexualized consumer marketplace are regularly mistaken by parents, teachers and media outlets as reflexive capitulation to it." She found that their "experiences of being sexualized and shamed based solely on their bodies and clothing made these young women intent on reclaiming their autonomy from others. What parents saw as self-objectification, daughters told Tanenbaum, was an attempt to assert control over their bodies and images."

In 2026, Tanenbaum published an essay in Ms. about her experiences in the intersection of misogyny and antisemitism, particularly how the fusion of these prejudices appear in the manosphere and throughout Jewish history. Drawing from the intellectual tradition of intersectionality and from Moya Bailey, who coined the term misogynoir to describe misogyny directed toward Black women, Tanenbaum coined a new term, misogynam, combining "misogyny" and "am" for "am yisrael" (Jewish people) to describe the intertwined hostility and violence directed at Jewish women.

== Personal life ==
Tanenbaum has described herself as "committed to observant Judaism." Although she attends an Orthodox Jewish synagogue, she does not identify as an Orthodox Jew "because Orthodoxy withholds equality from women and gays and lesbians." She has two sons.

== Works ==
=== Books ===
- Slut! : Growing Up Female With a Bad Reputation (1999)
- Catfight: Rivalries Among Women: From Diets to Dating, From the Boardroom to the Delivery Room (2002)
- Taking Back God : American Women Rising Up for Religious Equality (2009)
- Bad Shoes and the Women Who Love Them (2010)
- I Am Not a Slut: Slut-Shaming in the Age of the Internet (2015)
- Sexy Selfie Nation: Standing Up for Yourself in Today's Toxic, Sexist Culture (2025)
