= Slut: The Play =

2013 American play by Katie Cappiello

SLUT: The Play
- Written by: Katie Cappiello
- Characters: Joey Del Marco; Natalie; Christina; Grace; Danielle; Jane; Leila; Dominique; Julie; Anna; Sylvie

Premiere
- Date premiered: 2013
- Place premiered: New York City
- slutaplay.com

SLUT: The Play is a 2013 American play written by Katie Cappiello. The play was developed with members of The Arts Effect All-Girl Theater Company to address the damaging impact of slut-shaming and slut culture. The creators note that their play "is a call to action – a reminder" that slut-shaming is happening every day, almost everywhere. The play premiered at the 2013 New York Fringe Festival. In 2020, SLUT: The Play was adapted into a Netflix series called Grand Army.

== Plot ==
16-year-old Joanna "Joey" Del Marco is a high school student who is in a dance group that call themselves “the slut-squad”. On a night out with three trusted friends, she is assaulted by them. Once she comes forward about her assault, many friends, classmates, and even parents turn against her. They begin to blame and slut-shame her. The play highlights the damaging impact of rape culture on the lives of young women.

== Characters ==
- Joey: 16, junior; main character; is sexually assaulted and the story is based around interviews with her about the assault
- Natalie: 16, junior; part of the Slut Squad
- Christina: 16, junior; part of the Slut Squad
- Grace: 15, sophomore; part of the Slut Squad
- Danielle: 14, freshman; part of the Slut Squad
- Jane: 16, junior; Joey's best friend
- Leila: 14, freshman; friends with Danielle; involved with one of Joey's assaulters
- Dominique: 16, junior; classmate but not part of Joey's circle
- Julie: 16, junior; classmate but not part of Joey's circle
- Anna: 16, junior; one of Joey's best friends; twin sister of Tim, one of Joey's assaulters
- Sylvie: 16, junior; been sexually assaulted

== Development ==
Katie Cappiello and Meg McInerney founded the All-Girl Theater Company at The Arts Effect in 2007 as a space for girls to train and create theatre. Because of social media and pop culture, girls of all ages are victims of feeling like their sexuality is to be used like a “prized possession” and/or a weapon to be used. However, once a woman takes ownership of their sexuality, everything they do or say is shamed and used as an excuse that people will use for slut shaming, sexual assault of any kind, and a way to “devalue” women. Because of this, with the help of the All-Girl Theater Company, Katie Cappiello was inspired to create a play that addresses such topics/issues and bring awareness of the danger and consequences of it. Capiello and the All-Girl Theater Company began working on the SLUT: The Play in January 2012. The play was developed through weekly meetings with a group of 14-17 year olds who were a part of the company and helped with the plays dramaturgy. Cappiello finished the play in 2013.

== Production history ==
SLUT: The Play premiered in August 2013 at the New York Fringe Festival. Joey was played by Winnifred Bonjean-Alpart, who was 16 at the time. With the help of the local media and viewers, the play gathered great buzz and reviews. As a result, the play got the opportunity to take a national tour. Beau Willimon helped bring the play to Washington's Warner Theatre in 2015. In February 2016, SLUT: The Play made its off-Broadway debut.

== Adaptation ==
The play was developed into a Netflix series, Grand Army, although one that expands upon the source material. It premiered on October 16, 2020 and was on the top ten list. However, despite the popularity, it was not renewed for a second season.
