= Female intrasexual competition =

Competition between women over a potential mate

Female intrasexual competition in humans, is competition between women over a potential mate. Such competition might include self-promotion, derogation of other women, and direct and indirect aggression toward other women. Factors that influence female intrasexual competition include the genetic quality of available mates, hormone levels, and interpersonal dynamics.

There are two modes of sexual selection: intersexual selection and intrasexual selection. Intersexual selection includes the display of desirable sexual characteristics to attract a potential mate. Intrasexual selection is competition between members of the same sex other over a potential mate.

Compared to males, females tend to prefer subtle rather than overt forms of intrasexual competition.

== Self-promotion tactics ==
Self-promotion tactics are one of the main strategies that can be used during intrasexual competition for mates. It is often perceived to be the most socially desirable strategy, as it can be perceived as self-improvement, rather than an attack on competitors. Self-promotion tactics are especially useful for when women are looking for short-term mates, as such tactics will directly promote their sexual availability.

=== Luxury consumption ===
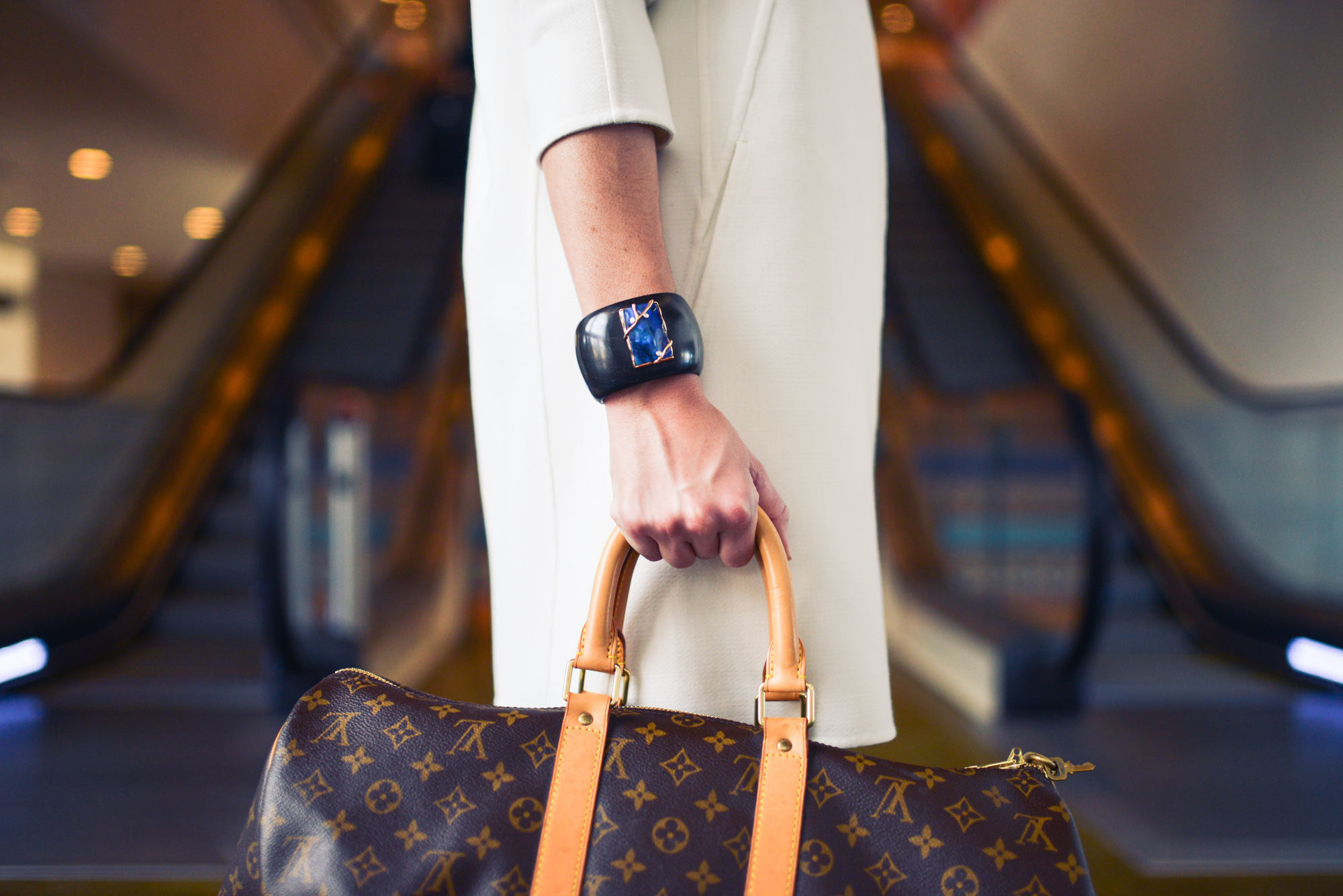
A woman shopping a luxury brand: Louis Vuitton (LV)

Self-promotion tactics refers to the different strategies that women might use to make themselves look better compared to other competing women. For example, women are interested in luxury items that enhance their attractiveness. Luxury items can indicate attractiveness by emphasising a higher status, which is a factor that potential mates will take into consideration.

It has been shown that when women are at their peak fertility, they will have an increased awareness and sensitivity to female intrasexual competition. This is due to the fact that when women are at their peak fertility, this is the most optimal time for them to mate and produce offspring. However, this tends to be only applied in situations when women are faced with rivals who they consider to be attractive. When with an unattractive rival, women might not necessarily see them posing any threat, as they would feel more attractive in comparison.

=== Cosmetic surgery ===
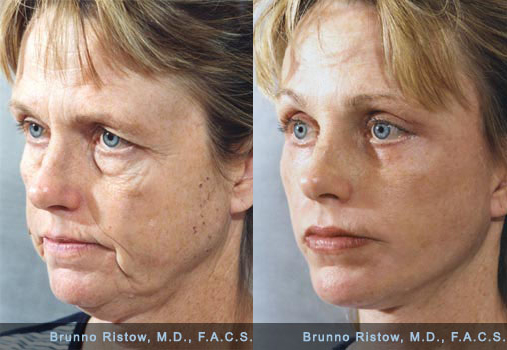
Facial rejuvenation (face-lift) procedure includes elevation of low eyebrows, eyelid operations and restoration of the natural fullness of the lips

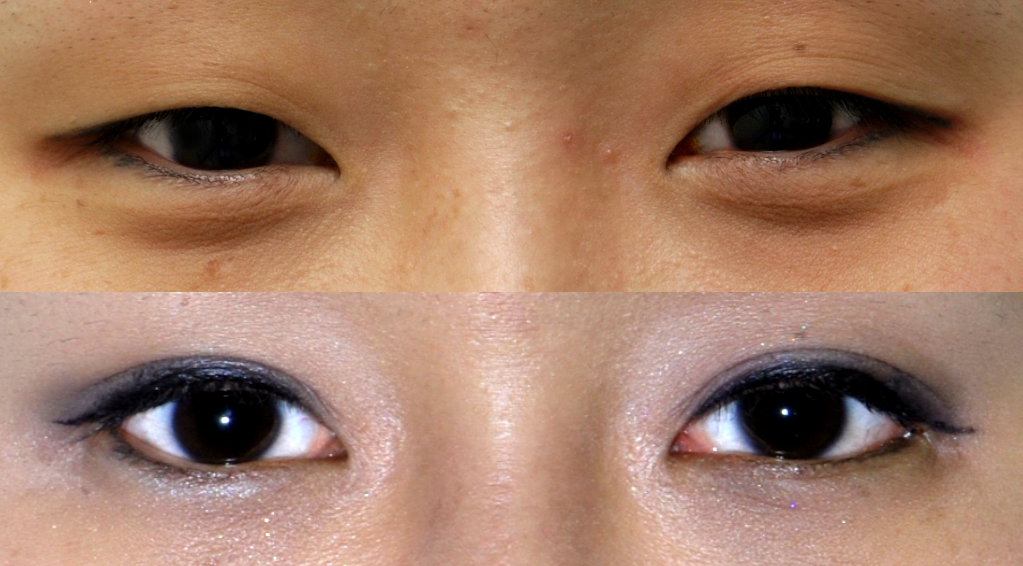
East Asian blepharoplasty, a surgery designed to add a crease to the eyelid, has become one of the most common facial surgical procedures in Asian countries

By using plastic surgery, women can surgically change their appearances to make themselves more attractive. They can surgically alter their faces and bodies according to their wishes. They can use botulinum toxin to prevent wrinkles and get face lifts. Or they can get liposuction to remove fat and achieve a more desirable body. Research has shown that the waist–hip ratio (WHR) of a female is a good indicator of their health, and that males tend to have a preference for females with a low WHR. When comparing women's pre- and post-operative photographs, post-operative photographs where women have a lower WHR are rated as more attractive, regardless of their weight gain or their body mass index (BMI). Culture plays a role in the type of plastic surgery a woman gets. The beauty standards for Westerners and Easterners are extremely different. Western models tend to be used to promote clothing and to portray seductiveness, whereas Asian models tend to be used to promote hair and skin products. Research suggest that Western models are more body-oriented.

Regardless, by using cosmetic surgery, females can change various aspects of their body to make themselves more attractive by displaying a more desirable waist–hip ratio. This can lead to competition with other females who may be considered less attractive in comparison. When women change their appearances, such as by applying cosmetic products and wearing sexy or stylish clothes, do make a difference and has been proven to be effective.

=== Clothing and make-up ===
Wearing form-fitting attire, such as dresses that highlight the waist and hips or pants that accentuate curves, is a common strategy to enhance the overall figure. Such outfits highlight the importance of the waist-hip ratio (WHR).

Short skirts, high-heels, and attire that showcases the legs. These clothing choices subtly emphasize leg length and overall body proportions, which are characteristics often deemed attractive.

Makeup, too, plays a role in self-promotion, allowing to enhance certain facial features and draw attention to specific areas such as the eyes and lips.

== Competitor derogation ==
There are a number of competitive strategies that females may use in a bid to appear more attractive in comparison to other females. Whilst males may use direct forms of aggression during intrasexual competition females typically compete for access to desired mates through the use of indirect aggression. Unlike direct aggression which involves delivering harm face to face, indirect aggression describes acts that are done circuitously, where an individual aims to cause harm but attempts to appear as if they have no harmful intentions. In the context of intrasexual competition, indirect aggression works to reduce the opportunities the rival may have in securing access to the desired mate to, therefore, increase one's chances of reproductive success. These include behaviours such as shunning, social exclusion, getting others to dislike the individual, gossip, spreading rumors and criticizing the rival's appearance.

=== Female derogation ===
Female derogation is a form of indirect aggression where females attempt to reduce the perceived value of another female "rival." Fisher (2004) studied female derogation and the effects of estrogen levels on this form of competition. Females disclosed their ovulation status and rated the attractiveness of male and female faces. Competitor derogation (giving low ratings) towards same-sex rivals occurred frequently when women were at their most fertile stages. In contrast, women gave same-sex rivals higher ratings during the least fertile stages of their ovulation. This indirect form of competition appears exclusive toward females as findings also showed that women, irrespective of ovulation status (high or low), showed no difference in the rating of male faces. Supporting research has also found that younger women who are considered as having high fertility, gossip about other women more than older women, who are no longer at their most fertile stage.

Indeed, indirect aggression appears more prevalent amongst (or exclusive to) females than males who are said to engage in more direct forms of competition. Research studying the relationship between indicators of attractiveness, such as physical attractiveness and indirect victimisation, showed that the likelihood of experiencing indirect victimization increased by 35% for females who perceived themselves as physically attractive. In contrast, being a male who is physically attractive decreased the chances of experiencing such indirect victimization. This also highlights how the physical attractiveness of a female is a trigger for indirect aggression and forms a core part of intersexual selection between the sexes.

Female derogation is also used to enforce equality amongst females which prevents high-status ambitious females from using their status to gain resources, allies and mates at the expense of other females. Thus attempts to gain social status are punished, while norms of "niceness" (which is defined as a lack of competitiveness) and equality dominates as a social norm amongst females. Equality is enforced by threat of social exclusion (which can be directed against any female, but females attempting to gain status are more likely to be targets) and low thresholds for dissolving relationships when inequality arises. Within a peer group, a high-status woman who tries to interfere with another's goals risks social derision and exclusion.

=== Slut-shaming ===
Another form of competitor derogation that is instrumental in making rivals appear less desirable is slut-shaming. In slut-shaming, females criticize and derogate same-sex rivals for engaging in sexual behaviors that are deemed "unacceptable" by society's standards, as it violates social expectations and norms with regard to their gender role.

For example, an act of sexual promiscuity demonstrated by a female is often considered non-conventional and inappropriate as such behaviors are not viewed as acts that constitute femininity. Females may choose to personally confront or spread rumors and gossip about the promiscuous activity of another female.

Buss and Dedden explored sex differences in competitor derogation to investigate the tactics that are commonly adopted by both sexes for intrasexual competition. Researchers presented both sexes with a list of tactics that are often employed by individuals to derogate same-sex competitors in an attempt to make them look undesirable to the opposite sex. On a scale from 1 (likely) to 7 (unlikely), participants rated the likelihood that members of their own sex would perform each act. Results revealed that tactics that pointed out a competitor's promiscuity were used by females more frequently than males. These involved "calling her a tramp," "telling everyone that she sleeps around a lot," and that "she cheats on men." Indeed, accusations of promiscuity are a frequent cause of female-female violence, where females may physically retaliate in a bid to defend their sexual reputation. British schoolgirls were surveyed and asked questions about their involvement in fights. In addition to 89% stating that they had actually been involved in a fight, 46% of reported fights were attacks on personal integrity related to promiscuity or gossiping.

With an ultimate goal of enhancing reproductive success at the expense of others, slut-shaming effectively works to arouse suspicion and cause suitors to question the fidelity of these females. In the long term, men may have doubts regarding the paternity of any offspring produced, and since humans strive for reproductive success, (which, for a man is to reproduce and to continually invest in his own children), the decision to mate with such an individual drastically reduces the chances of reproductive success. Considering this and the high value that men attach to women who practice chastity, men are less likely to mate with a supposedly promiscuous female due to the fear of becoming a cuckold.

== The effectiveness of strategies: competitor derogation vs. self-promotion tactics ==
Generally speaking, competitor derogation is often rated as less effective than self-promotion tactics. Men and women tend to judge self-promotion tactics that show resource potential and sexual availability as highly effective for short and long-term mating, respectively. Women, relative to men, appear more likely to engage in self-promotion than competitor derogation tactics. With females having a tendency to engage in more indirect forms of aggression/derogation such as spreading rumors and shunning (social manipulation), studies investigate the extent to which such strategies enable females success by increasing their mating opportunities. Common indicators of reproductive success are sexual activity and dating behaviors. Research has found that the use of indirect aggression is positively correlated with increased dating behavior and early engagement in sexual activity. Arnocky and Pavilion investigated whether the use of victimization or personally experiencing victimization could predict the dating behavior of adolescents over a year. In a follow-up assessment, indirect aggression (peer-nominated) was found to predict dating behavior one year after the initial assessment. Moreover, indirect aggression appeared to be a more powerful predictor of dating behavior than other factors such as initial dating status, peer-rated attractiveness, peer-perceived popularity, and age. Overall, females who used indirect aggression were more likely to be dating in comparison to victimized individuals, who were less likely to have a dating partner. The notion that peer aggression is associated with adaptive dating outcomes is further supported by studies that note that females who frequently displayed indirect aggression began dating much earlier in life than individuals who experienced female-female peer victimization, for whom dating behavior had a much later onset. Dating popularity is also found to have a strong association with the use of indirect aggression. With regard to sexual activity, White et al. investigated the influence of peer victimization and perpetuated aggression on reproductive opportunities amongst young adults. Measures of sexual activity such as the number of previous sexual partners and the age of their first sexual intercourse were obtained alongside measures of their social experiences in middle and high school. Results found that females who experienced more peer aggression during adolescence had their first sexual intercourse at a later age. In contrast, females who perpetuated high levels of indirect peer aggression tended to have their first sexual encounter at earlier stages of adolescence.

== Variables that influence female competition ==
Females often compete using low-risk strategies compared to males as females have to provide primary care and protection to their offspring. Fisher (2015) suggested that attractiveness is the single route by which women compete and men have shown a preference for attractive women.

Other factors that influence women's intrasexual competition are:

=== High genetic quality of the males ===
Females will promote themselves more often when males demonstrate various abilities to provide secure resources, protection for offspring, or when the costs of competing are inferior to the benefits gained. They choose males with the highest possible qualities that can maximise reproductive success. Attractiveness and gene quality are both believed to be highly correlated. Some research suggests that male attractiveness is biased by female's phenotypic quality, male attractiveness does not necessarily correspond to their gene quality. This leads to the state-dependent choice theory which suggests females with lower qualities prefer low-quality males than high-quality males. Promiscuity does not affect attractiveness rankings if physical attractiveness outweighs this variable.

=== Ovarian hormones and hormonal variations ===
The ovarian cycle phase is an emerging concern in exploring issues related to female intrasexual competitive behaviour. It has been found that when fertility rate was maximised during the ovarian phase, women gave significantly lower ratings of attractiveness to other females. Ovarian hormones affect how females view their potential competitors and cause them to behave more competitively.

Many studies implied that testosterone levels were one of the key factors in aggressive competitive behaviour in social situations. When testosterone is produced in the brain and gonads in both genders, the androgen receptors in neural and peripheral tissues are being possessed and trigger behavioural and physiological responses to testosterone. The role of androgenic steroids is to activate or facilitate aggressive behaviour. High levels of oestrogen are shown to have an effect on women's derogation on potential competitors (e.g. rating other female faces as less attractive) but there is no effect on ratings of male attractiveness.

=== Interpersonal dynamics ===
Females often compete with their own sex to gain the attention of potential mates with high genetic qualities in order to induce reproductive success. Miller et al. (2011)'s study revealed that presence of another sex individual leads to testosterone enhancement.

The ratio of females to males in the course of competition might alter salivary testosterone levels in both genders which lead to competition. The nonequivalent ratio of men with "good genes" to a large number of accessible females also leads to female intrasexual competition. Biosocial status hypothesis indicated that to win in the female competition, it is thought to enhance in testosterone production thus facilitating violent, prevailing behaviours and exhibition of high status. Whereas, losing in female competition lowers testosterone levels which weaken the tendency of competing. Testosterone levels correspond to various factors such as form of competition, characteristics of opponent, psychological state and baseline hormone levels of the person competing.

== See also ==
- Dominance hierarchy
- Male intrasexual competition
- Queen Bees and Wannabes
