= Mean Girls =

2004 film by Mark Waters

- Theatrical release poster
- Directed by: Mark Waters
- Screenplay by: Tina Fey
- Based on: Queen Bees and Wannabes by Rosalind Wiseman
- Produced by: Lorne Michaels
- Starring: Lindsay Lohan; Rachel McAdams; Tim Meadows; Ana Gasteyer; Amy Poehler; Tina Fey
- Cinematography: Daryn Okada
- Edited by: Wendy Greene Bricmont
- Music by: Rolfe Kent
- Production company: Broadway Video
- Distributed by: Paramount Pictures
- Release dates: April 19, 2004 (Cinerama Dome); April 30, 2004 (United States)
- Running time: 97 minutes
- Country: United States
- Language: English
- Budget: $17–18 million
- Box office: $130.1 million

Mean Girls is a 2004 American teen comedy film directed by Mark Waters, produced by Lorne Michaels, written by Tina Fey and starring Lindsay Lohan. The supporting cast includes Rachel McAdams, Fey, Tim Meadows, Amy Poehler, Ana Gasteyer, Lacey Chabert, Lizzy Caplan, Daniel Franzese, Neil Flynn, Jonathan Bennett, and Amanda Seyfried in her feature film debut. The film follows Cady Heron, a naïve teenager who transfers to an American high school after years of homeschooling in Africa, who quickly befriends two outcasts. The trio plan to exact revenge on Regina George, the queen bee of an envied clique known as the "Plastics".

Mean Girls was produced by Lorne Michaels' production company Broadway Video. Fey conceived the idea for the film after reading the 2002 self-help book Queen Bees and Wannabes by Rosalind Wiseman. The book describes female high school social cliques, school bullying and the resulting damaging effect on teenagers. Fey also drew from her own experience at Upper Darby High School in Upper Darby Township, Pennsylvania, as an inspiration for some of the film's concepts. Principal photography began in September 2003 and ended in November. Although the film is set in the Chicago suburb of Evanston, Illinois, shooting took place primarily in Toronto, Ontario, Canada.

Mean Girls premiered at Pacific's Cinerama Dome in Hollywood on April 19, 2004, and was theatrically released in the United States on April 30 by Paramount Pictures. Critics reacted positively to the film, praising Waters' direction, Fey's screenplay and its humor, and the cast performances (particularly Lohan's). The film was also a box office success, grossing over US$130 million worldwide against an estimated budget of $17 to $18 million. Lohan won two MTV Movie Awards and three Teen Choice Awards, among numerous other accolades. In 2021, Richard Brody of The New Yorker ranked Lohan's performance as the 11th-best movie performance of the 21st century.

A sequel, Mean Girls 2, premiered on ABC Family in January 2011. The film also spawned various adaptations, including a stage musical, which premiered on Broadway in March 2018, with a film adaptation of the musical released in January 2024.

== Plot ==
After being homeschooled her entire life and having spent the last twelve years in Africa, 16-year-old Cady Heron begins her first day at North Shore High School. She struggles to make friends and is patronized by the teachers, but befriends outcasts Janis Ian and Damian Leigh, who explain the school's various cliques to her and warn her about the "Plastics", a trio of wealthy mean girls consisting of ruthless queen bee Regina George, insecure gossiper Gretchen Wieners, and bubbly airhead Karen Smith. Regina, Gretchen, and Karen take a shine to Cady and unexpectedly invite her to join the Plastics. Upon realizing this, Janis hatches a plan to infiltrate the group and destroy Regina's reputation.

Cady becomes infatuated with her classmate Aaron Samuels. Karen and Gretchen reveal that Aaron is Regina's ex-boyfriend and thus is off-limits, though Regina claims not to care if Cady and Aaron date. Despite Janis's warnings, Cady comes to enjoy hanging out with the group, including writing insulting remarks about their classmates and teachers in a scrapbook called the "Burn Book." At a Halloween house party, Regina promises to talk to Aaron on Cady's behalf, but instead kisses him in front of her and resumes their relationship. Enraged, Cady fully commits to Janis's plan.

Over the following months, Cady, with Janis and Damian's help, manages to trick Gretchen into divulging secrets, sabotage Regina's relationship with Aaron (and spend time with him by pretending to need math tutoring, despite being mathematically gifted), and cause Regina to gain weight by giving her high-calorie snack bars under the pretense that they are diet food. After violating the Plastics' dress code rules by wearing sweatpants on Monday due to her weight gain, Regina is ousted from the group, as Cady replaces her as "queen bee".

While Cady's parents are out of town, she throws a house party, during which she drunkenly admits to Aaron that she does not actually need math tutoring. He derides her for being as manipulative as Regina. Janis and Damian angrily confront Cady for throwing a party instead of attending the former's art show and declare that she has become as fake as she pretended to be. Meanwhile, Regina discovers the truth about the snack bars and inserts slander of herself into the Burn Book, hoping to frame Cady and the other Plastics.

Regina spreads the book's pages throughout the hallways, inciting chaos. Principal Duvall and math teacher Ms. Norbury gather the female junior students in the gym to talk through their social issues. During this, Janis publicly admits her plan to destroy Regina and openly mocks her, much to the other students' excitement. Regina furiously storms out, pursued by an apologetic Cady. While ranting at Cady, Regina is hit by a school bus, fracturing her spine. Rumors circulate that Cady intentionally pushed Regina in front of the bus, resulting her in becoming a social pariah and grounded by her parents.

After realizing a comment she wrote in the Burn Book has framed Ms. Norbury as a drug dealer, causing police to visit the school and interrogate her math class, Cady decides to take full responsibility for the book. Regina, Gretchen, and Karen are spared punishment. To earn extra credit, Cady joins the Mathletes, moderated by Ms. Norbury and led by fellow student Kevin Gnapoor. At the state finals, she correctly answers the tiebreaker question, winning the championship. The team arrives at the Spring Fling dance, where Cady is elected queen, to her surprise. She breaks her tiara and distributes the pieces to others in the crowd, making peace with Janis, Damian, and the Plastics. She later shares a slow dance and kiss with Aaron.

The Plastics disband by the time senior year begins. A fully recovered Regina joins the school's lacrosse team to channel her anger positively, Gretchen joins the "Cool Asians" clique, and Karen becomes the school's weather girl. Cady begins dating Aaron and continues to hang out with Janis and Damian, the former of whom starts dating Kevin. While reflecting on the relative social peace that has taken over the school, Cady notices a new popular clique in the freshman class and wonders how long the "Junior Plastics" will last, imagining them being hit by a school bus.

== Cast ==
- Lindsay Lohan as Cady Heron, a 16-year-old girl who transfers to a public high school after being homeschooled her whole life in Africa
- Rachel McAdams as Regina George, the leader of The Plastics
- Tina Fey as Ms. Sharon Norbury, a math teacher at North Shore High School and the Mathletes moderator
- Tim Meadows as Mr. Ron Duvall, the principal of North Shore High School
- Amy Poehler as Mrs. June George, Regina's mother
- Ana Gasteyer as Betsy Heron, Cady's mother
- Lacey Chabert as Gretchen Wieners, the second member of the Plastics and Regina's second-in-command
- Lizzy Caplan as Janis Ian, Cady and Damian's Art Freak friend and artist
- Daniel Franzese as Damian Leigh, Cady and Janis's friend who is "too gay to function", according to the latter
- Neil Flynn as Chip Heron, Cady's father
- Jonathan Bennett as Aaron Samuels, Regina's ex-boyfriend and Cady's love interest
- Amanda Seyfried as Karen Smith, the third member of the Plastics
- Rajiv Surendra as Kevin Gnapoor, the president of the Mathletes and an amateur rapper

The film's cast also includes Molly Shanahan and Jonathan Malen as Kristen Hadley and her boyfriend, and Daniel DeSanto and Diego Klattenhoff as jocks Jason and Shane Oman, Gretchen and Regina's respective boyfriends. Dwayne Hill plays the school's predatory gym teacher Coach Carr. Alisha Morrison plays "unfriendly" student Lea Edwards and Julia Chantrey plays Amber D'Alessio. Sharron Matthews portrays Mr. Duvall's secretary Joan.

== Production ==
=== Development ===
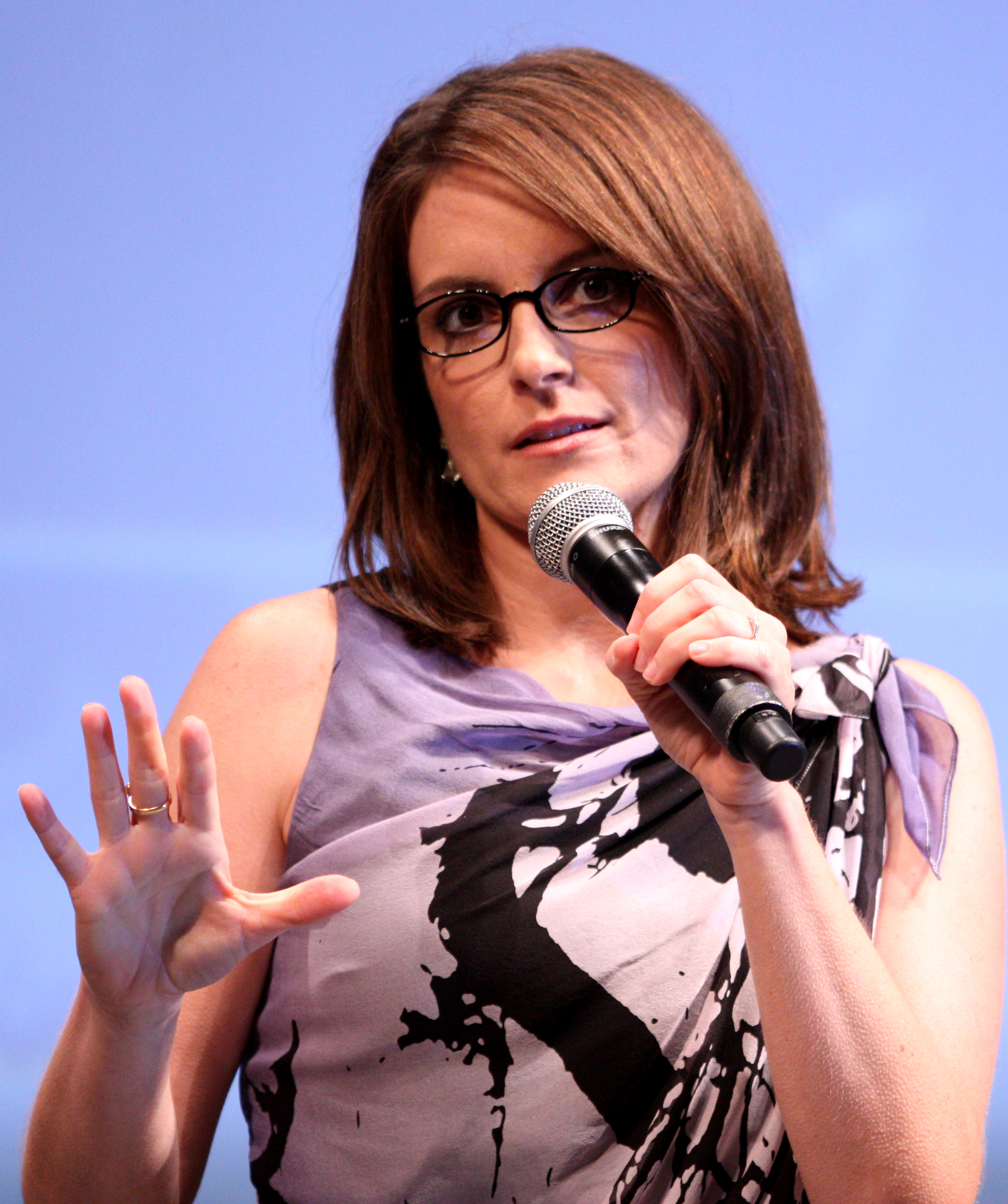
Mean Girls writer Tina Fey

Tina Fey read Rosalind Wiseman's Queen Bees and Wannabes and called Saturday Night Live producer Lorne Michaels to suggest it could be turned into a film. Michaels contacted Paramount Pictures, who purchased the rights to the book. As the book is nonfiction, Fey wrote the plot from scratch, borrowing elements from her own experience at Upper Darby High School and her impressions of Evanston Township High School and New Trier Township High School from her time living in the Chicago area, upon which the film's fictional "North Shore High School" is based.

Fey named many characters after real-life friends. In a 2014 interview about the movie, she told Entertainment Weekly, "I tried to use real names in writing because it's just easier." Main character Cady Heron was named after Fey's college roommate Cady Garey. Damian was named after Fey's high school friend Damian Holbrook, who went on to become a writer for TV Guide. Minor character Glen Coco is named after the real Glenn Cocco, a film editor in Los Angeles and friend of Tina Fey's older brother. Janis Ian was named after singer Janis Ian, who was one of the two musical guests on the first Saturday Night Live episode, in which she sang her hit song "At Seventeen", which can be heard playing in the background when the girls are fighting at Regina's house. The film was originally going to be called Homeschooled.

=== Casting ===
Fey, Michaels, and Paramount Pictures chairman Sherry Lansing wanted to cast Lindsay Lohan in the film after seeing her performance in Freaky Friday (2003). Lohan was originally set to play Regina George, but the casting team ended up feeling she was their strongest choice for the role of Cady Heron, and since executives feared the "mean girl" role would alienate her audience, she eventually agreed to play the lead. Rachel McAdams was cast as Regina because Fey felt McAdams being "kind and polite" made her perfect for such an evil-spirited character, and director Mark Waters, who previously directed Lohan in Freaky Friday, felt Lohan was "a little intimidated" by her which made him like their dynamic. McAdams had originally auditioned for the role of Cady but was deemed "a bit too old" for the character. Kristen Stewart, Michelle Trachtenberg and Mae Whitman were considered for the role of Cady opposite Lohan's Regina George early on. According to casting director Marci Liroff, Blake Lively was the top choice to play the role of Karen Smith, but was told by the producers to keep looking. Amanda Seyfried originally auditioned for Regina, and although Waters thought she was "fantastic", the producers instead suggested her for Karen due to her "spacey and daffy sense of humor". Leighton Meester, Haylie Duff, Kate Mara, Megan Fox and Ashley Tisdale were also up for the role of Karen. America Ferrera and Kat Dennings were both heavily favored for the role of Janis Ian. Lizzy Caplan was at first considered too beautiful for that role, for which Waters felt a "Kelly Osbourne-type" was necessary, but Caplan was chosen for being able to portray raw emotion. Evan Rachel Wood was offered a role in the film, but turned it down due to scheduling conflicts, a decision she later regretted. Mary Elizabeth Winstead was asked to audition for the role of Gretchen Wieners, but her mother declined as she disliked the script. Ashley Tisdale and Vanessa Hudgens also auditioned for Gretchen. Jonathan Bennett was a last-minute replacement after the actor originally slated to play the role of Aaron Samuels was fired. James Franco had previously been considered for Aaron, and Penn Badgley, Jared Padalecki and Max Minghella all auditioned as well. Fey's decision to hire Bennett was due to his resemblance to her longtime SNL co-star Jimmy Fallon. Fey envisioned Ross Mathews for the role of Damian Leigh; Mathews auditioned, but claimed that his audition was "terrible". Daniel Franzese was ultimately cast as Damien. Lacey Chabert and Daniel Franzese were the last actors tested for their roles. Fey wrote two roles based on fellow SNL alumni Tim Meadows and Amy Poehler, the latter of whom Fey thought the producers would perceive as too young to portray a teenager's mother. The cast additionally ended up with a fourth veteran of the show, Ana Gasteyer.

=== Filming ===
Although set in Evanston, Illinois, the film was mostly shot in Toronto, Ontario, Canada; at the Etobicoke Collegiate Institute and Malvern Collegiate Institute. Additional filming took place at Montclair High School in Montclair, New Jersey, US. Landmarks include the University of Toronto's Convocation Hall and Sherway Gardens, Toronto. Principal photography commenced on September 27, and concluded on November 25, 2003.

== Soundtrack ==
Mean Girls: Music from the Motion Picture was released by Rykodisc and Bulletproof Records on September 21, 2004, the same day as the DVD release. The album featured songs performed by the Donnas, Pink, Kelis, Samantha Ronson, Boomkat, Blondie, Katy Rose and Peaches amongst several others.

== Home media ==
Mean Girls was released on VHS and DVD in North America on September 21, 2004, five months after its theatrical release. It was released in a special collector's edition, in both its original 1.77:1 widescreen aspect ratio and a 1.33:1 fullscreen crop, including several deleted scenes, a blooper reel, three TV spots, the theatrical trailer, previews, and three featurettes. A Blu-ray version of the film was released on April 14, 2009. The film was later re-released on a 15th-anniversary Blu-ray in 2019. A limited SteelBook edition of the film was released in September 2022. It was released on 4K Ultra HD Blu-ray for the first time on April 30, 2024, in commemoration of the film's 20th anniversary along with the release of the 2024 film.

== Reception ==
=== Box office ===
In its opening weekend, Mean Girls grossed $24.4 million from 3,159 screens at 2,839 theaters in the United States, ranking number one at the box office and averaging $8,606 per venue. The film closed on September 9, 2004, grossing $86.1 million domestically and $44.4 million internationally for a total worldwide gross of $130.1 million. Paramount said the audience was 75% female, and 50% was under the age of 18. Over 90% of moviegoers rated the picture either "excellent" or "very good", and positive notices remained strong even outside the target demographic; ratings were over 80% positive from men in their thirties.

=== Critical response ===
Mean Girls received largely favorable reviews; critics lauded Lohan and McAdams' performances and labeled the film as Caplan and Seyfried's breakthrough roles. Review aggregation website Rotten Tomatoes gives the film an approval rating of 84% based on 220 reviews, with an average rating of 6.90/10. The site's critical consensus states: "Elevated by a brilliant screenplay and outstanding ensemble cast, Mean Girls finds fresh, female-fronted humor in the high school experience." On Metacritic, the film has a score of 66 out of 100, based on 39 critics, indicating "generally favorable reviews". Audiences polled by CinemaScore, gave the film an average grade of "A−" on an A+ to F scale.

Roger Ebert of the Chicago Sun-Times gave the film three stars out of four, writing: "In a wasteland of dumb movies about teenagers, Mean Girls is a smart and funny one." Ann Hornaday of The Washington Post wrote that it "boasts a one-two-three punch in star Lindsay Lohan, screenwriter Tina Fey and director Mark Waters, and, indeed, it delivers a knockout". The screenplay was highly praised by critics with Peter Travers of Rolling Stone calling it "comic gold". In April 2004, Mick LaSalle of the San Francisco Chronicle wrote, "as in The House of Yes and Freaky Friday, Waters keeps it wild but real", noting that "all the supporting performances go right to the edge of absurdity without crossing the line into random zaniness." Entertainment Weekly put it on its end-of-the-decade "best-of" list, saying: "'Fetch' may never happen, but 2004's eminently quotable movie is still one of the sharpest high school satires ever. Which is pretty grool, if you ask me!" In 2006, Entertainment Weekly had also named it the 12th-best high school film of all time: "While Mean Girls is technically a comedy, its depiction of girl-on-girl cattiness stings incredibly true." In 2012, Rotten Tomatoes included the film in its "Top 50 Greatest Teen Comedies" list. In 2021, Marie Claire ranked Mean Girls as the best 2000s movie, calling it "the '00s pop culture staple".

In 2020, Hornaday included Mean Girls at No. 8 in her list "The 34 Best Political Movies Ever Made". She wrote: "[I]n addition to the usual adolescent high jinks and catty comebacks, screenwriter Tina Fey managed to create an incredibly insightful taxonomy of hierarchical power as it is amassed, wielded and ultimately dismantled — all within the complicated context of high school politics, Queen Bee-enforced gender norms and internalized sexism. That's a lot to accomplish, even if we never exactly made 'fetch' happen".

In March 2021, Richard Brody of The New Yorker ranked Lohan's performance as the eleventh best of the 21st century up to that point, praising her "blend of charisma and awkwardness, innocence and guile" as well as "faux-casual earnestness" she used for dialog. In 2021, members of Writers Guild of America West (WGAW) and Writers Guild of America, East (WGAE) ranked its screenplay 34th in WGA's 101 Greatest Screenplays of the 21st Century (so far). In 2022, Rolling Stone ranked Mean Girls as the twentieth greatest comedy of the 21st century, saying: "Tina Fey established herself as one of America's best comedy writers courtesy of this instant teen-movie classic, which boasts one of the most quotable scripts of the past 20 years", while IndieWire ranked it as the fifteenth best comedy of the 21st century, calling the script "effortlessly funny, but what makes the film truly timeless has more to do with the actors' ability to find the human grace notes amid the absurd high school hijinks (Kälteen Bars, anyone?) and instant-classic one-liners ("That's so fetch"). It's a high school comedy with broad genre humor and specific insight into teenage anxieties, and for that, it stands the test of time." In October 2022, The Independent also included Lohan's role in a list of "outstanding performances", stating that she "gives a pretty flawless performance, dexterously balancing the film's irreverent comic tone with moments of occasional pathos." In 2025, it ranked number 82 on the "Readers' Choice" edition of The New York Times' list of "The 100 Best Movies of the 21st Century."

Scholarly analyses have interpreted the film as a depiction of relational aggression and social hierarchies among teenage girls, highlighting how indirect forms of conflict shape adolescent identity and group dynamics Critics note that the film reflects how teenage social groups use popularity, exclusion, and gossip to enforce hierarchy and shape behavior in high school setting.

== Cultural impact ==
Mean Girls has become a pop culture phenomenon. Fans have made GIFs and memes of the film and posted them on various social media platforms, including Facebook, Twitter and Tumblr. It is considered one of the most quotable films of all time. In an interview about the film, Fey noted: "Adults find it funny. They are the ones who are laughing. Young people watch it like a reality show. It's much too close to their real experiences so they are not exactly guffawing." October 3 began being dubbed "Mean Girls Day" on social media especially beginning in 2012, alluding to a line by Cady, the protagonist. People also celebrate by wearing pink based on a line by Karen, another character. Clothing designers have printed quotes and other iconic imagery onto clothing and various merchandise.

The cast have reunited in video over the years on that day for various causes. In 2017, a GoFundMe was created to raise money for the victims of the Las Vegas shooting and the National Compassion Fund. In 2019, they collaborated with the Thirst Project to fund a freshwater well in Uganda. In 2020, the cast was honored with the Pioneering Spirit Award for their #MeanGirlsDoGood campaign. On October 3, 2020, Katie Couric moderated a virtual cast reunion to reminisce about the film. Organized in collaboration with HeadCount to promote voting in the 2020 United States presidential election, it was the first time the entire cast gathered since the 2004 premiere. Paramount Pictures released the entire film for free streaming on TikTok in 23 snippets to celebrate Mean Girls Day 2023. The hashtag "#meangirlsday" was one of the top trends on the platform that month.

American singer-songwriter Mariah Carey has said several times that she is a fan, quoting the film in numerous interviews and TV appearances, including a 2013 episode of American Idol. Carey's 2009 single, "Obsessed", begins with an interlude quote where she says, "And I was like, 'Why are you so obsessed with me?'", a line from Regina. Carey's ex-husband, Nick Cannon, revealed that the song was inspired by the film. In September 2020, Fey quizzed Carey to prove how much of a "superfan" she is on Billboard's Quizzed video series. Meanwhile, British band Wet Leg quotes the film ("Is your muffin buttered?/Would you like us to assign someone to butter your muffin?") in their 2021 song "Chaise Longue".

In August 2013, the White House tweeted a photo of President Obama's dog, Bo, holding a tennis ball and captioning: "Bo, stop trying to make fetch happen". Taco Bell made a reply to the White House, also using one of the quotes from the film. In June 2018, the official Twitter account of the Israeli Embassy in the U.S. made headlines when it responded to a tweet by Iranian leader Ali Khamenei, calling Israel "a malignant cancerous tumor", with an animated GIF of the "Why are you so obsessed with me?" quote. In March 2019, Hillary Clinton tweeted a GIF of the same quote which went viral for being considered a response to Donald Trump. At the 2013 People's Choice Awards, Jennifer Lawrence referenced the film in her speech when she won Favorite Movie Actress.

Multiple scenes have been reenacted and parodied by various celebrities throughout the years following its release, including Ed Sheeran, Ariana Grande, Iggy Azalea, Amber Rose and Waka Flocka Flame during a 2014 skit for MTV. In 2013, a Tumblr called "Les Mean Girls" emerged, which coupled lines from the film with images from the 2012 film adaptation of the musical Les Misérables. The scene where Janis explains to Cady the cliques of their school is parodied in the 2008 superhero/teen spoof Superhero Movie, where Trey points out the different groups of cliques to Rick Riker. One of the cliques is "Frodos" – kids dressed up as Hobbits akin to Frodo, the Lord of the Rings character, and another the "Scarface Society" – dressed up as Al Pacino's character Tony Montana from the 1983 film Scarface.

In June 2020, Irish Taoiseach Leo Varadkar referenced the film during a COVID-19 lockdown news briefing. Varadkar stated that "some have asked whether there is a limit to what we can achieve", before drawing upon a line from the film: "My answer is that the limit does not exist." Lord of the Rings and The Goonies actor Sean Astin bet the Irish leader "50 quid" to quote Mean Girls in his next speech.

The sixth episode of the third season of How to Get Away with Murder included several references to the film, including Michaela Pratt using the line "you can't sit with us", Annalise Keating eating her lunch in a toilet cubicle after feeling like an outcast, Laurel Castillo wearing sweatpants on a Monday, and Simon Drake calling several other students "mean girls". At the 2021 British Academy Television Awards, actress Aimee Lou Wood also mentioned the scene where Cady broke her Spring Fling crown in pieces and shared it with the other nominees in her speech. The second novel by American author Karen M. McManus, Two Can Keep a Secret, includes a reference to a line in the film, where the character Ezra refers to his school's prom committee as looking like "they wear pink on Wednesdays".

In October 2024, the film was released in North American theaters again by Fathom Events for its 20th anniversary.

To celebrate the film's 20th anniversary, Paramount collaborated with MGA Entertainment to feature Cady and the Plastics as limited-edition Bratz dolls. The collaboration collection released each character on separate dates throughout October 2024, with Cady on the 3rd, Regina on the 17th and Karen and Gretchen on the 31st (Halloween).

=== Accolades ===
Organizations	Ceremony date	Category	Recipient(s)	Result	Ref.
Teen Choice Awards	August 8, 2004	Choice Comedy Movie Actress	Lindsay Lohan	Won	
Teen Choice Awards	August 8, 2004	Choice Breakout Movie Actress	Lindsay Lohan	Won	
Teen Choice Awards	August 8, 2004	Choice Movie Liar	Lindsay Lohan	Nominated	
Teen Choice Awards	August 8, 2004	Choice Movie Blush	Lindsay Lohan	Won	
Teen Choice Awards	August 8, 2004	Choice Movie Blush	Rachel McAdams	Nominated	
Teen Choice Awards	August 8, 2004	Choice Comedy Movie Actress	Rachel McAdams	Nominated	
Teen Choice Awards	August 8, 2004	Choice Breakout Movie Actress	Rachel McAdams	Nominated	
Teen Choice Awards	August 8, 2004	Choice Movie Hissy Fit	Rachel McAdams	Nominated	
Teen Choice Awards	August 8, 2004	Choice Movie Villain	Rachel McAdams	Nominated	
Teen Choice Awards	August 8, 2004	Choice Breakout Movie Actor	Jonathan Bennett	Nominated	
Teen Choice Awards	August 8, 2004	Choice Comedy Movie	Mean Girls	Nominated	
Teen Choice Awards	August 8, 2004	Choice Movie Chemistry	Lindsay Lohan and Jonathan Bennett	Nominated	
Teen Choice Awards	August 8, 2004	Choice Movie Fight/Action Sequence	Lindsay Lohan vs. Rachel McAdams	Nominated	
Smash Hits Poll Winners Party	November 21, 2004	Best Movie	Mean Girls	Runner-up	
Smash Hits Poll Winners Party	November 21, 2004	Best Movie Star	Lindsay Lohan	Nominated	
People's Choice Awards	January 9, 2005	Favorite Comedy Movie	Mean Girls	Nominated	
Critics' Choice Awards	January 10, 2005	Best Young Performer	Lindsay Lohan	Nominated	
AARP Movies for Grownups Awards	January 30, 2005	Best Movie for Grownups Who Refuse to Grow Up	Mean Girls	Nominated	
International Online Cinema Awards	February 3, 2005	Best Breakthrough	Lindsay Lohan	Nominated	
Awards Circuit Community Awards	February 9, 2005	Best Adapted Screenplay	Tina Fey	Nominated	
Gold Derby Awards	February 18, 2005	Adapted Screenplay	Tina Fey	Nominated	
Gold Derby Awards	February 18, 2005	Breakthrough Performance	Rachel McAdams	Nominated	
Writers Guild of America Awards	February 19, 2005	Best Adapted Screenplay	Tina Fey	Nominated	
Golden Schmoes Awards	February 25, 2005	Best T&A of the Year	Lindsay Lohan	Nominated	
Online Film & Television Association	February 27, 2005	Best Youth Performance	Lindsay Lohan	Nominated	
Online Film & Television Association	February 27, 2005	Best First Screenplay	Tina Fey	Nominated	
Kids' Choice Awards	April 2, 2005	Favorite Movie Actress	Lindsay Lohan	Nominated	
Much Viewers' Poll	April 23, 2005	Hottest Action Sequence	Lindsay Lohan and Rachel McAdams	Won	
Much Viewers' Poll	April 23, 2005	Best of the Worst	Rachel McAdams	Won	
Much Viewers' Poll	April 23, 2005	Best One-Liner	Rachel McAdams	Runner-up	
BMI Film & TV Awards	May 18, 2005	BMI Film Music Award	Rolfe Kent	Won	
MTV Movie Awards	June 4, 2005	Best Female Performance	Lindsay Lohan	Won	
MTV Movie Awards	June 4, 2005	Breakthrough Female Performance	Rachel McAdams	Won	
MTV Movie Awards	June 4, 2005	Best On-Screen Team	Lindsay Lohan, Rachel McAdams, Lacey Chabert, and Amanda Seyfried	Won	
MTV Movie Awards	June 4, 2005	Best Villain	Rachel McAdams	Nominated	
Australian Kids' Choice Awards	September 20, 2005	Fave Movie Star	Lindsay Lohan	Nominated	
Gold Derby Decade Awards	January 17, 2010	Adapted Screenplay of the Decade	Tina Fey	Nominated	
Thirst Project	October 3, 2020	Pioneering Spirit Award	Cast of Mean Girls / #MeanGirlsDoGood	Won	

== Legacy ==
=== Works inspired by Mean Girls ===
In early 2014, Warner Bros. Pictures and New Line Cinema announced a planned release date of May 8, 2015, for a film adapted from another book penned by Rosalind Wiseman. The project was titled Mean Moms, despite not being announced as a spin-off of Mean Girls. Beth McCarthy-Miller was set to direct with Jennifer Aniston to star. However, in May 2014, New Line Cinema pulled the film from its proposed release date of May 2015.

In 2018, Jonathan Bennett, who portrayed Aaron Samuels, released a cookbook inspired by the film, called The Burn Cookbook: Real Recipes to Feed Your Inner Plastic. The following year, he teamed up with Nocking Point Wines to release a limited rosé wine edition.

Ariana Grande parodied the film in the music video for her 2018 song "Thank U, Next". Actors Bennett and Stefanie Drummond appeared in the video. A clip from the film was featured in a 2020 Discover Card commercial, which aired during the Super Bowl LIV. K-pop singer Sunmi named her song "You Can't Sit with Us", after a quote from the film.

A Mean Girls-themed pop-up restaurant in Santa Monica called "Fetch" was announced in 2020 as well. Primark launched a loungewear range inspired by the film in October 2019. On October 3, 2020, the Young Veterans Brewing Company released a Mean Girls-themed beer called "Army Pants & Flip Flops". Several Mean Girls-themed events, merchandising products and screenings have been often organized and produced in homage to the film.

In August 2020, Screen Junkies released an Honest Trailers episode, calling the film "the best thing to come out of that era," with Screen Rant's Daniel Gillespie saying: "Mean Girls remains entertaining, funny, and, most importantly, accurate. [...] That relevance almost two decades later proves that Mean Girls is deserving of its classic status," and Slashfilm's Ethan Anderton writing that the "generation-defining high school movie" not only captures the teenage culture of the early 2000s perfectly, "but it's also hilariously clever for being adapted from a non-fiction parenting advice book [...] Mean Girls is great because it captures that cruel teen vibe perfectly, and it tries to deliver a nice wholesome message to fight it, which kids will laugh at, agree with, and then never do anything about." In September 2020, the Pillsbury Company released a limited edition of Toaster Strudel featuring pink icing and Mean Girls packaging to pay homage to its movie-claimed inventor's daughter, Gretchen Wieners. In October 2023, Nestlé's Coffee Mate announced that a limited-edition pink frosting flavored creamer would be available from January 2024 to celebrate the film's 20th anniversary.

In November 2023, Walmart unveiled its annual holiday campaign featuring much of the original cast, including Lohan, Seyfried, Chabert, Franzese, and Surendra, reprising their roles as adults and recreating the film's scenes with modern twists.

=== Adaptations ===
==== Video games ====
A game for PC was released in 2009 featuring characters specifically created for the game.

In 2010, a Mean Girls video game developed by Crush Digital Media and planned to be published by 505 Games for the Nintendo DS handheld game console was announced, but was ultimately canceled before release. Nearly completed before cancellation, the game resurfaced in 2021 by YouTuber Ray Mona (also known as Raven Simone), who received a file for the game from an anonymous email. A full playthrough was uploaded to her channel on July 15, 2021.

In 2015, Episode launched an interactive animated web story entitled Senior Year. It picks up after the events of the film with the player taking the role of a new student who enters North Shore during senior year. It was followed by two other stories, Sorority Rush and Spring Break.

==== Musical ====
On January 28, 2013, Fey confirmed that a stage musical adaptation was in the works. Fey wrote the book of the show, while her husband, Jeff Richmond, composed the music with lyrics by Nell Benjamin. Directed by Casey Nicholaw, the original production premiered at the National Theatre in Washington, D.C., on October 31, 2017, for pre-Broadway tryouts. The show transferred to Broadway at the August Wilson Theatre, with previews beginning on March 12, 2018, and official opening on April 8, 2018.

The original cast featured Erika Henningsen as Cady, Taylor Louderman as Regina, Barrett Wilbert Weed as Janis, Grey Henson as Damian, Ashley Park as Gretchen, and Kate Rockwell as Karen. The show received positive reviews from critics, and was nominated for twelve awards at the 72nd Tony Awards, including Best Musical. An original Broadway cast recording was released on May 18, 2018. Due to the COVID-19 pandemic, the show played its final performance on Broadway on March 11, 2020, after one performance with a mostly new cast.

On January 23, 2020, Fey announced that a film adaptation of the stage musical was in active development. The film was directed by Samantha Jayne and Arturo Perez Jr. in their feature film directorial debut, with Fey returning to write the screenplay and also produce alongside returning producer Lorne Michaels. Richmond and Benjamin also returned to rework their songs from the musical.

The musical film was released theatrically on January 12, 2024, by Paramount Pictures, after being originally set to premiere on the streaming service Paramount+. Reneé Rapp, who previously portrayed Regina as a replacement for Louderman in the musical from 2019 until its closure in 2020, reprises her role, while Fey and Tim Meadows reprise their roles from the original film. Ashley Park, who originated the role of Gretchen in the stage musical, appears as Madame Park, the school French teacher. Lohan also makes a cameo appearance as the moderator of the Mathletes tournament, which was unannounced prior to the film's release.

==== Novels ====
A novelization based on the script, by author Micol Ostow, was released in September 2017 by Scholastic. Another novelization – written in the style of William Shakespeare – by Ian Doescher was released in April 2019, under the title William Shakespeare's Much Ado About Mean Girls.

On September 29, 2020, a graphic novel, written by Arianna Irwin and illustrated by Alba Cardona, was released by Insight Editions. Titled Mean Girls: Senior Year, it picks up after the events of the film and centers on the arrival of a new student, Megan Moretti, who wants to be the most popular kid at school. A Little Golden Book retelling was released in 2024.

== Sequel ==
=== Mean Girls 2 ===
A made-for-television sequel, titled Mean Girls 2, premiered on January 23, 2011, on ABC Family, and subsequently released on DVD on February 1 by Paramount Home Entertainment. The film is directed by Melanie Mayron and stars Meaghan Martin, Jennifer Stone, Maiara Walsh, Nicole Gale Anderson, and Claire Holt, while Tim Meadows reprises his role as the principal Ron Duvall. Meadows is the only original cast member to return in the sequel.

=== Potential sequel ===
In late September 2014, discussions arose that Lohan had pitched an idea to Fey for a sequel. Later that year, Lohan, along with other cast members of the original film, asked Fey to write a screenplay for it. The idea was brought up during a 10th anniversary of the film in Entertainment Weekly, with Fey declaring she regretted not doing a sequel closer to its original release: "At the time we did want to start the conversation about the sequel, and for whatever reason I was like, 'No!!! We shouldn't do that!' Now I look back and I'm like, 'Why?' But now, no—it's too late now." Seyfried had previously said she was "really willing to pursue" a sequel and was unsure why it had not happened. In December 2016, Lohan mentioned she was still trying to pitch a sequel, with the hopes of Jamie Lee Curtis and Jimmy Fallon appearing in the film. She said she knew Fey, Michaels and Paramount were busy, declaring: "I will keep forcing it and pushing it on them until we do it." In October 2018, Seyfried said people needed to start a campaign for it to finally come into fruition. In January 2019, Lohan was interviewed by Howard Stern who wondered whether the sequel would ever happen. Lohan repeated her interest in revisiting the role and confirmed she had spoken to Fey about it, also saying sequel plans were not currently in the works, "I think they can't do it right now. I've spoken to her [Tina], but it can't happen without her and all of the cast. [...] Sometimes you're like, 'It's just too soon to do it.' But it's been 15 years." In October 2019, Chabert was asked if a sequel would be happening to which she replied: "I don't know. I wish I had an answer for you, I feel like you need to start a petition," while saying she would "of course" revisit the character if given the chance as "it would be so much fun to revisit these women and see where they are now."

In April 2020, Lohan was once again asked about the sequel by David Spade and confessed she had been hanging on to the idea of coming back to doing movies with that project "for a really long time" but that it was out of her hands. "To work with Tina [Fey], and the whole crew again, and Mark Waters. That was really what I wanted. I was excited to do that. But that's all in their hands really," she concluded. A few days later, McAdams also expressed interest in reprising her role in a sequel, after having declared in previous years she would be up for it as long as Fey was on board, "She's our master-in-chief on this one. So, if she's into it, then I'm into it." Bennett then reacted to his co-stars by saying, "I was extremely excited when I heard Rachel [McAdams] say she'd love to play Regina George again because I've talked to over half the cast, including Lindsay [Lohan], and we all feel the same way", continuing, "We'd love to bring these beloved characters back to life at some point." In an August 2020 interview on the podcast Unspooled, director Mark Waters discussed an idea for a sequel where the main characters from the original movie would now be young mothers serving together in a parent–teacher association, adding that its development is entirely up to Fey wanting to write a screenplay. A possible sequel was also questioned by Katie Couric while moderating a virtual reunion with the film's cast on October 3, 2020. Bennett then said in an interview he thought the virtual reunion "opened the door" for a sequel.

In August 2022, Franzese talked about a potential sequel or reboot, "I would absolutely love it. And I would do it in any form whatsoever. This movie brings people so much joy. [...] I mean, I want to do a whole movie with the whole cast. We all play different characters. People would love that, you know? Tina Fey's got that power and she ain't pulling the trigger. So I don't know who else could do it." He revealed he was writing his own script and would try to pitch it to Fey as they approached the film's 20th anniversary. In November 2022, Caplan was asked about a Mean Girls reboot and, although she was unsure about what was left of the story, she stated she would "of course" want to be a part of it: "I would be an idiot not to join." That same month, Seyfried interviewed Lohan for Interview magazine and expressed again their desire to work on a sequel but found it unlikely to happen at that moment due to the development of the movie musical. Meanwhile, during an interview on The Tonight Show Starring Jimmy Fallon, Chabert also shared a pitch where their characters' kids would become the "new mean girls". In early 2023, Seyfried stated all four actresses would like to reunite on set, suggesting potential roles as the mothers of their characters in the movie musical. In January 2024, Fey said they tried to bring back all four actresses for the movie musical but "it didn't come together". When asked about a possible sequel, she responded: "I have a feeling Paramount would love that. I have not really thought much about that. To me, part of why the stakes are so high in the story is because everyone's so young and feelings are huge, love is huge and friendship is huge in a way [that it isn't with] middle-aged moms. I love writing about middle-aged people, but I don't know."
