= Rosalind Wiseman =

American writer

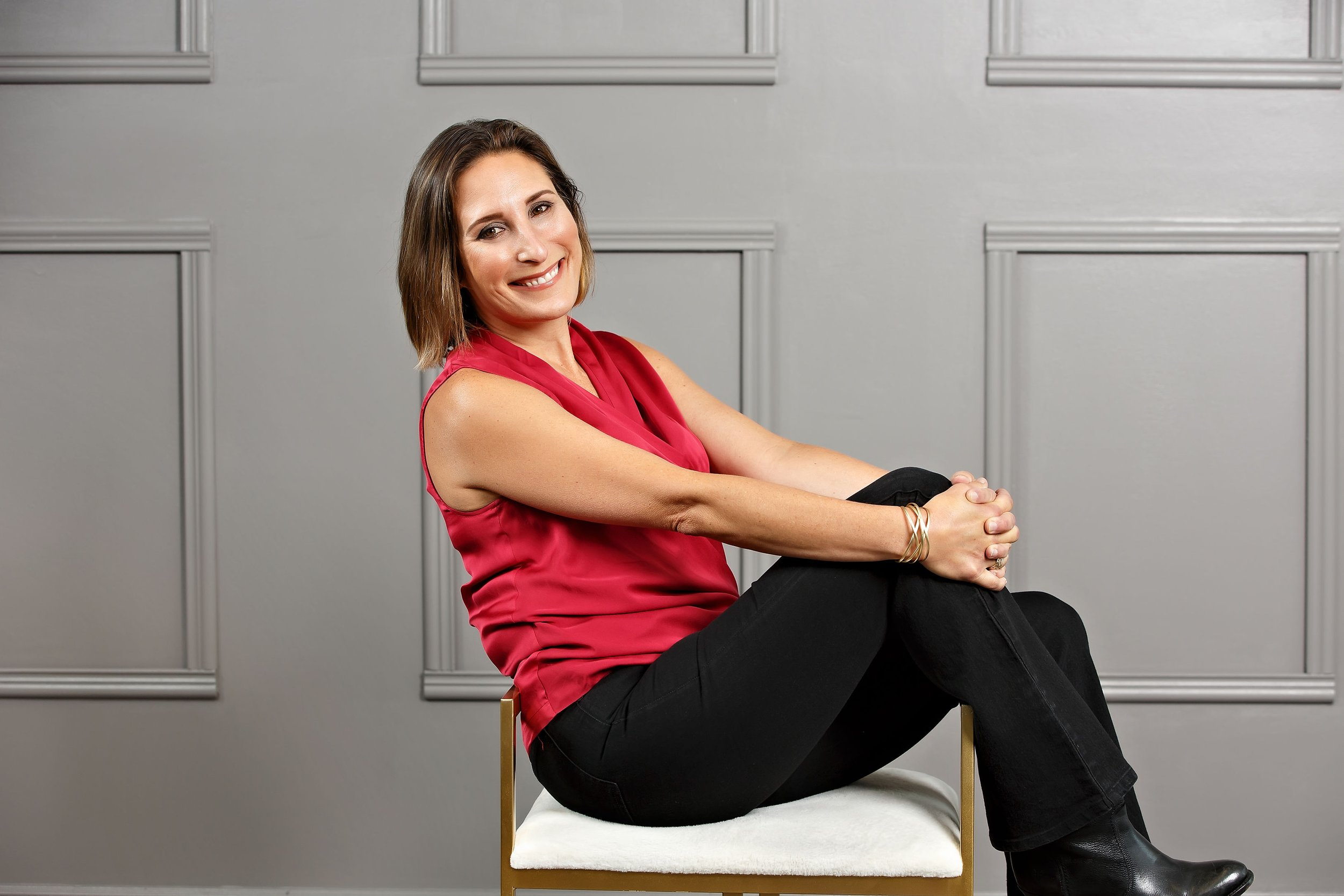
- Born: 1969
- Occupation: Author
- Spouse: James Edwards (m. 1996)
- Writing career
- Period: 1991–present
- Notable works: Queen Bees and Wannabes series
- Website: rosalindwiseman.com

Rosalind Wiseman is an American author and public speaker. She is best known for her 2002 self-help book Queen Bees and Wannabes, which was the basis for the 2004 film Mean Girls.

== Early life ==
Wiseman grew up in Washington, D.C., with her two younger siblings and parents. After attending Maret School in Washington, DC she attended Occidental College in Los Angeles, where she began studying martial arts with fellow student James Edwards, whom she married in 1996. By the time she graduated with a bachelor's degree in political science in 1991, Wiseman had earned a second degree black belt in Tang Soo Do karate.

== Career ==
Wiseman and Edwards moved back to Washington, D.C., after graduating, where she began to teach martial arts to young women. After hearing the young girls' questions about social issues they faced, and watching them become empowered by martial arts, Wiseman was inspired to begin working in youth empowerment and leadership-building.

After spending over a decade speaking with girls about the social issues they face, including boys, cliques, gossip, social hierarchy, and self-image, Wiseman wrote Queen Bees & Wannabes. The book gives suggestions on how parents can better understand and help their daughters navigate the social atmosphere of what Wiseman refers to as "Girl World." Since its release in 2002, it has become a New York Times Best Seller and was the basis for the 2004 film Mean Girls.

In 2015, Wiseman co-founded Cultures of Dignity, an organization that provides consulting services related to education and well-being. She is also the creator of the Owning Up Curriculum.

== Personal life ==
Wiseman is Jewish, with ancestors from Poland and Germany. She lives in Colorado with her husband and two sons.

== Works ==
- Queen Bees & Wannabes: Helping Your Daughter Survive Cliques, Gossip, Boyfriends & Other Realities of Adolescence (2002), ISBN 1-4000-4792-7 ISBN 978-1400047925
- Queen Bee Moms & Kingpin Dads: Dealing with the Parents, Teachers, Coaches, and Counselors Who Can Make — or Break — Your Child's Future (2006), ISBN 1-4000-8300-1
- Owning Up Curriculum: Empowering Adolescents to Confront Social Cruelty, Bullying, and Injustice (2009), ISBN 0-87822-609-5 ISBN 978-0878226092
- Queen Bees & Wannabes: Helping Your Daughter Survive Cliques, Gossip, Boyfriends, and the New Realities of Girl World, (2009), ISBN 0-307-45444-4 ISBN 978-0307454447
- Boys, Girls & Other Hazardous Materials (2010), Penguin Books ISBN 0-399-24796-3 ISBN 978-0399247965
- Masterminds and Wingmen: Helping Our Boys Cope with Schoolyard Power, Locker-Room Tests, Girlfriends, and the New Rules of Boy World (2013) ISBN 978-0-307-98665-8
- The Guide: Managing Douchebags, Recruiting Wingmen, and Attracting Who You Want (2013), ASIN B00EZB57QC
- Owning Up Curriculum (2020)
- Distance Learning Playbook for Parents: How to Support Your Child’s Academic, Emotional and Social Learning in Any Setting (2020), ISBN 978-1071838327
- Courageous Discomfort: How to have Brave, Life Changing Conversations about Race and Racism (August 2022) by Chronicle Books. Co-authored with Shanterra McBride, ISBN 978-1797215266
