= Queen Bees and Wannabes =

2002 book by Rosalind Wiseman

- Author: Rosalind Wiseman
- Language: English
- Genre: Self-help
- Publisher: Three Rivers Press
- Publication date: May 2002
- Publication place: United States
- ISBN: 0-609-60945-9

Queen Bees and Wannabes (Note: Subtitled "Helping Your Daughter Survive Cliques, Gossip, Boyfriends, and Other Realities of Adolescence") is a 2002 self-help book by Rosalind Wiseman. Written for parents of teenage girls, the book focuses on the ways in which girls in high schools form cliques, and on handling patterns of aggressive behavior. The book was, in large part, the basis for the teen comedy film Mean Girls (2004) starring Lindsay Lohan, its stage musical adaptation, and the 2024 film version of the latter. The book's third edition was published in 2016.

== Latest edition ==
Rosalind Wiseman wrote the third edition of Queen Bees and Wannabes in 2016 to update her growing audience and involve the shift in social dynamics of the changing years. Wiseman felt that after the original publication of her book, the content did not properly reflect the same criteria with the following years of the twenty-first century. Wiseman points out in an interview with CBS News, by Katie Couric, that a main reason for the need for a refresh is the introduction of social media and advancements in technology. Due to the lack of social media influence in 2002, when the original Queen Bees and Wannabes was published, the standards of Wiseman's audience were drastically different.

=== Reasons for the 3rd edition ===
In the 2009 interview with CBS News, Rosalind Wiseman speaks on her key concepts for updating her writing and what she will also add to her work. Even though the interview is several years before the publication of the latest edition, it allows readers to see the ongoing and evolving process Wiseman went through to articulate her decisions in revising the entire book. These revisions include introduction to social media, increase in online pressure, and change in parental roles due to technological dynamics.

==== Social media ====
Wiseman fears the implementation of social media platforms is causing the increase in intensity of childhood mistakes. Her concerns focus on the easy publication of media that children lack the cognitive ability to realize their true actions. Children will make mistakes in their younger years, but now all the world can see. Wiseman points out to Katie Couric, the interviewer, that privacy only exists in people's minds now that social media is involved. She uses this concept in the 3rd edition to stress and teach parents how to include their family and individual values within the modern world.

==== Challenges of online pressure ====
Along with social media comes the increase in pressure to post a certain way that matures girls faster. This was taught by Wiseman when she points out that she sees "mean girl" behavior at a younger age. Wiseman focuses on the sexual pressure that lives within social media. She states that "the National Campaign to Prevent Teen and Unwanted Pregnancies and CosmoGirl teamed up for a survey. Twenty-two percent of teen girls and eleven percent of young girls between the ages of 13 and 16 have sent nude or semi-nude photos of themselves…And 71 percent of teen girls have sent or posted suggestive messages". Rosalind Wiseman understands the importance of adding this topic in her newest edition, even though sensitive, to help parents and daughters realize that their "private" online exchanges are never truly what they seem.

==== Balancing parenting and technology ====
Wiseman states in the interview that "this is a privilege. This is not a right. And for you to participate, you need to not humiliate, tease, send embarrassing pictures, forward embarrassing pictures" when speaking about the need for parents and guardians to help structure their children to stop the previous points mentioned. If kids use social media, it is a privilege, not a right. Wiseman stresses to her readers in the newest edition the need for parents to help aid their children in growing up in an online world. By doing so, she believes the structure will allow for children and teenagers to know right from wrong and to think before they post or interact online.

== Influence on Mean Girls ==
In 2024, Tina Fey, the creator of Mean Girls, released the musical version of the movie. The original movie, released in 2004, took inspiration from Rosalind Wiseman's Queen Bees and Wannabes. Furthermore, the two pieces of work relate due to both creators wanting to update the original versions. Tina Fey states in the 2024 article that "I was writing in the early 2000s very much based on my experience as a teen in the late '80s. It's come to no one's surprise that jokes have changed. You don't poke in the way that you used to poke". Fey stresses that with changing times, the concept of jokes and comedy must adapt as well. Overall, the updates to Queen Bees and Wannabes relates to the changes happening in the world today and how Rosalind Wiseman's book influences the new Mean Girl movie.

== See also ==
- Female intrasexual competition
- Queen bee (sociology)
