= Slut =

Term applied to an individual

Slut (archaic: slattern) is an English-language term for a person, usually a woman, who is sexually promiscuous or considered to have loose sexual morals. Predominately used as an insult, sexual slur, or offensive term of disparagement, it originally meant "a dirty, slovenly woman". Rarely used in reference to men, clarification such as male slut or man whore may be warranted.

The word was used as early as the late 14th century (in the form of an adjective, sluttish, referring to a man's untidy appearance) by Geoffrey Chaucer in The Canterbury Tales. From the late 20th century, there have been attempts to reclaim the word, exemplified by various SlutWalk parades, and some individuals embrace the title as a source of pride.

== Etymology, common usages and synonyms ==
The common denotative meanings of slut are 'sexually promiscuous woman', or 'immoral or dissolute woman; prostitute'. These definitions identify a slut as a woman of low character—a person who lacks the ability or chooses not to exercise a power of discernment to order her affairs. Similar terms used for men are cad, rake, male slut, man whore, himbo, womanizer, stud, and player. The adjective slutty carries a similar connotation, but can be applied both to people and to clothing and accessories, such as Halloween costumes.

Although the ultimate origin of the word slut is unknown, it first appeared in Middle English in 1402 as slutte (AHD), with the meaning of 'dirty, untidy, or slovenly woman'. Even earlier, Geoffrey Chaucer used the word sluttish (c. 1386) to describe a slovenly man; however, later uses appear almost exclusively associated with women. The modern sense of 'sexually promiscuous woman' dates to at least 1450. The word was originally used around 1450 in the late Middle English language. It was used to describe a woman as dirty, or refer to her as a prostitute, harlot, or immoral woman. The word slut also took a similar form around the same era in the Norwegian language as slutr 'sleet', also known as an impure liquor.

Another early meaning was 'kitchen maid or drudge' (c. 1450), a meaning retained as late as the 18th century, when hard knots of dough found in bread were referred to as slut's pennies. An example of this use is Samuel Pepys's diary description of his servant girl as "an admirable slut" who "pleases us mightily, doing more service than both the others and deserves wages better" (February 1664). Slut and slutishness occur in Shakespeare's comedy As You Like It, written in 1599 or 1600. In the nineteenth century, the word was used as a euphemism in place of bitch in the sense of a female dog.

Today, the term slut has a pervasive presence in popular culture and pornography, but is almost exclusively used to describe women. An exact male equivalent of the term does not exist. The lack of a comparably popular term for men highlights the double standard in societal expectations (gender roles) between males and females, as negative terms for sexually promiscuous males are rare. Out of the 220 terms ascribed to females and 20 terms ascribed to males, all female terms are disapproving while some male terms signal approval or praise; these include stud, player, and man whore. While colloquial terms such as male slut or man whore are used in popular culture, they are usually used in a joking manner. There are, however, other terms that can be used to criticize men for their sexuality. For example, a man's masculinity can be undermined by using terms such as weak, sissy, pussy, or whipped. They also dismiss female-on-male abuse, and are just as powerful and representative of modern societal prejudices. Hence, women may find it difficult to hold high positions at their workplace, whereas men may be mocked for choosing to be stay-at-home fathers. Although a sexually active and professionally successful woman might be seen as a threat, a man without those qualities is often regarded with suspicion and questions about his sexuality.

The word slut is commonly interchanged with the words tramp, whore, hoe, nympho, and hooker. All of these words have a very negative connotation. Additional meanings and connotations of the term are negative and identify a slut as being a slovenly and ugly person, for example, as in these quotations from OED2:

Hearne, 1715: "Nor was she a Woman of any Beauty, but was a nasty Slut."

Shenstone, 1765: "She's ugly, she's old, ... And a slut, and a scold."

The attack on the character of the person is perhaps best brought together by the highly suggestive and related compound word, slut's-hole, meaning a place or receptacle for rubbish; the associated quote provides a sense of this original meaning:

Saturday Review (London), 1862: "There are a good many slut-holes in London to rake out."

Slut can also be used as verb to denote behavior characterized as that of a slut. For example, in the 1972 play, That Championship Season, by Jason Miller, contained the exchange:

COACH: I don't care what that hot pantsed bitch said. Go home and kick her ass all over the kitchen. All that slutting around...
GEORGE. She's not a slut...
COACH. She was punished for slutting, wasn't she? She was punished and so were you!

== Alternative usages and culture ==
=== General ===
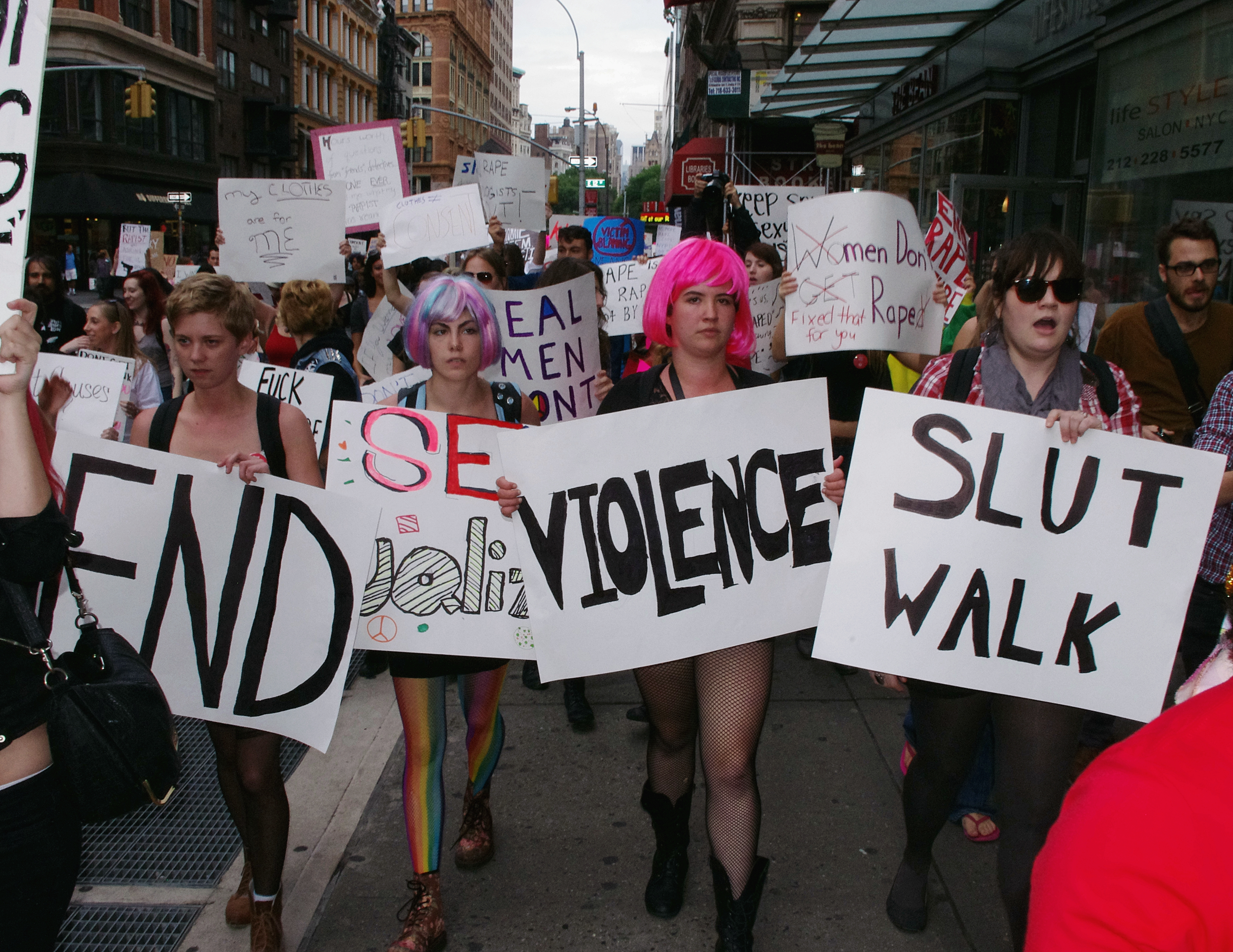
There have been various efforts to both criticise and reclaim use of the word slut.

The word slut is used as a slang term in the BDSM, polyamorous, and gay and bisexual communities. A parallel exists between the female term slut and the term gay for males. Unlike women, who are usually policed for being sexually promiscuous, men are often criticized for not being masculine or dominant enough, thus questioning their heterosexuality. Unlike women, who are expected to be sexually chaste, men are expected to be sexually active, thus having more sexual freedom. Although slut is rarely used to describe heterosexual men, it is commonly used among gay males. When discussing sexual activity, slut is used to shame gay men for taking sexual risks, such as unprotected sex or having multiple partners. However, if used in a humorous way, slut may also favor sexual freedom and mark the shift from traditional gender roles in gay men.

With BDSM, polyamorous, and non-monogamous people, in usage taken from the book The Ethical Slut, the term has been used as an expression of choice to openly have multiple partners, and revel in that choice: "a slut is a person of any gender who has the courage to lead life according to the radical proposition that sex is nice and pleasure is good for you." A slut is a person who has taken control of their sexuality and has sex with whomever they choose, regardless of religious or social pressures or conventions to conform to a strait-laced monogamous lifestyle committed to one partner for life.

The term has been reappropriated to express the rejection of the concept that government, society, or religion may judge or control one's personal liberties, and the right to control one's own sexuality. In April 2013, Emily Lindin, founder of the UnSlut Project, created a blog to share her stories on sexual bullying to "provide some perspective to girls who currently feel trapped and ashamed". The blog now consists of entries from members of all ages, ethnicities, and genders. The film, UnSlut: A Documentary Film, coincides with the project and is screened across the country.

The double standard associated with slut-labeling is part of the modern-day rape culture. Rape culture is "the casual debasement [of women] ... that has become such a part of our lives that it is often invisible." Though people in society are vocally anti-rape, there is an insinuation that certain types of rape are acceptable or that women are voluntarily taking actions that justify sexual advances. "For example, women continue to be blamed if they are raped because of how they are dressed, the assumption that women purportedly lie about being raped remains popular, and certain women, such as married women or women of colour, are still considered 'unrapeable'". The word slut and the double standard it contains reflects the gender norms and gender biases that are prevalent in a culture in which rape is constantly justified. People from all sects of society contribute to this justification.

There have been many movements or "SlutWalks" taking place around the world to regain a sense of pride in women. Many slut walks or movements protest against the idea that a woman's appearance, often considered promiscuous, is a justification of sexual assault and rape. The participants in these walks protest against individuals that excuse rape due to the woman's appearance, including victim blaming and slut shaming; slut walks have now become a worldwide movement.

=== Women of color ===
The word slut means different things to white women and people of color, especially black women. Slut has different associations for black women. Anna North of The New York Times covered Leora Tanenbaum who stated, "As Black women, we do not have the privilege or the space to call ourselves 'slut' without validating the already historically entrenched ideology and recurring messages about what and who the Black woman is." She argued that, for black women, the word slut does not mean anything very harmful due to the history of being treated as slaves in the past. Black women's "relationship to the term slut" is informed by a history of racism and slavery, of "having been seen as objects of property, not just for the sexual gratification of those in power but also for reproduction of whole generations of slaves, which involved rape most of the time."

Most of the SlutWalks were coordinated by white women, and some black women felt uncomfortable when joining. Sociologist Jo Reger writes: "Women of color ... argued that the white women organizers and participants had not considered the ways in which the sexuality of women of color had been constructed through a history of oppression, rape, and sexual exploitation." People of color, especially black people, had been avoiding words like slut, jezebel, hottentot, mammy, mule, sapphire, or welfare queens.

Model and actress Amber Rose was one of the first people to conduct and take a lead for a SlutWalk for people of color. "The Amber Rose SlutWalk Festival is a completely inclusive space. This event is a zero tolerance event and we do not condone hateful language, racism, sexism, ableism, fat-shaming, transphobia or any other kind of bigotry. Further, we recognize that shaming, oppression, assault and violence have disproportionately impacted marginalized groups, including women of color, transgender people and sex workers, and thus we are actively working to center these groups at our events."

== See also ==
- Polyandry
- Sexual bullying
