= Hazbin Hotel (soundtrack) =

2024 soundtrack album

Hazbin Hotel (Original Soundtrack)

Soundtrack album by Cast of Hazbin Hotel
- Released: January 19, 2024 (Part 1); January 26, 2024 (Part 2); February 1, 2024 (Part 3); February 2, 2024 (complete soundtrack)
- Length: 14:19 (Part 1); 9:36 (Part 2); 9:51 (Part 3); 38:53 (complete soundtrack)
- Label: A24 Music
- Producers: Andrew Underberg; Sam Haft

Cast of Hazbin Hotel chronology
Hazbin Hotel (Original Soundtrack) (2024)	Hazbin Hotel: Season Two (Original Soundtrack) (2025)

Singles from Hazbin Hotel (Original Soundtrack)
- 1. "Happy Day in Hell" Released: October 20, 2023; 2. "Poison" Released: January 5, 2024

Professional ratings
Review scores
Source	Rating
AllMusic	(complete soundtrack) (Part 1) (Part 2)

Hazbin Hotel (Original Soundtrack) is an extended play soundtrack album released in three parts from the first season of the American adult animated television musical series Hazbin Hotel. The first part was released on January 19, 2024, the second on January 26, and the third on February 1. The music was composed and written by Andrew Underberg and Sam Haft.

== Background ==
After the success of the 2019 pilot episode of Hazbin Hotel, series creator Vivienne "VivziePop" Medrano began to work on season one of the series in collaboration with A24, Bento Box Entertainment, and Amazon MGM Studios.

== Recording and production ==
A24, an independent entertainment company, picked up the tv series for production in August 2020. In December 2021, the official Hazbin Hotel Twitter account teased the first season's release. The original release date was intended to be in summer 2023, but due to the 2023 Writers Guild of America strike the production of the series was stalled and the release was pushed back to January 2024.

On November 27, 2023, Amazon introduced Sam Haft from The Living Tombstone and Emmy-nominated Andrew Underberg as the composers and producers of season one. Haft previously worked with Medrano on the music for the Hazbin Hotel pilot and the soundtrack of Helluva Boss. The cast of the series was also announced in 2023, starring Erika Henningsen as Charlie Morningstar, Jeremy Jordan as Lucifer Morningstar, Stephanie Beatriz as Vaggie, and Alex Brightman as Adam.

== Release and promotion ==
Two singles were released before the series, with "Happy Day in Hell" being released on October 20, 2023, after its preview at New York Comic Con, and "Poison" being released on January 5, 2024. Both songs were performed in front of the live premiere audience for the first four episodes, with Medrano posting both performances to her YouTube channel on January 17, 2024.

After the release of the first four episodes on January 19, A24 Music and Amazon Prime Video released an extended play album titled Hazbin Hotel Original Soundtrack (Part 1). On January 26, the second part was released, including four total songs from "Dad Beat Dad" and "Welcome to Heaven". The final part was released on February 1, which included songs from the final two episodes of season one. A day later, the full soundtrack album was released. It included all 16 songs from the first season.

== Accolades ==
Award	Year	Category	Result	Ref.
Billboard Music Awards	2024	Top Soundtrack	Nominated	
American Music Awards	2025	Favorite Soundtrack	Nominated	

== Track listing ==
All tracks are written by Sam Haft and Andrew Underberg.

Singles
No.	Title	Performer(s)	Length
1.	"Happy Day in Hell"	Erika Henningsen; Stephanie Beatriz; Mick Lauer (Note: Mick Lauer, who voiced Husk in the 2019 pilot episode of Hazbin Hotel, makes a vocal cameo as the Trenchcoat Demon and performs various background vocals.); Keith David; Blake Roman	2:57
2.	"Poison"	Blake Roman	2:07
Total length:			5:04

Hazbin Hotel Original Soundtrack (Part 1)
No.	Title	Performer(s)	Length
1.	"Hell Is Forever"	Alex Brightman; Erika Henningsen; Sam Haft	2:20
2.	"Stayed Gone"	Christian Borle; Amir Talai; Joel Perez; Sam Haft	3:00
3.	"It Starts with Sorry"	Erika Henningsen; Alex Brightman; Blake Roman; Stephanie Beatriz	1:30
4.	"Whatever It Takes"	Daphne Rubin-Vega; James Monroe Iglehart; Stephanie Beatriz	2:57
5.	"Respectless"	Daphne Rubin-Vega; Lilli Cooper; James Monroe Iglehart	1:35
6.	"Loser, Baby"	Keith David; Blake Roman	2:55
Total length:			14:19

Hazbin Hotel Original Soundtrack (Part 2)
No.	Title	Performer(s)	Length
1.	"Hell's Greatest Dad"	Jeremy Jordan; Amir Talai; Erika Henningsen; Kimiko Glenn; Sarah Stiles	2:13
2.	"More Than Anything"	Jeremy Jordan; Erika Henningsen	3:13
3.	"Welcome to Heaven"	Darren Criss; Shoba Narayan; Patina Miller	1:00
4.	"You Didn't Know"	Shoba Narayan; Patina Miller; Erika Henningsen; Jessica Vosk; Alex Brightman; Stephanie Beatriz	3:08
Total length:			9:36

Hazbin Hotel Original Soundtrack (Part 3)
No.	Title	Performer(s)	Length
1.	"Out for Love"	Daphne Rubin-Vega	1:30
2.	"Ready for This"	Erika Henningsen; Leslie Kritzer; Amir Talai; Kimiko Glenn; Alex Brightman; Blake Roman; Sam Haft	3:29
3.	"More Than Anything (Reprise)"	Stephanie Beatriz; Erika Henningsen	1:00
4.	"Finale"	Erika Henningsen; Jeremy Jordan; Stephanie Beatriz; Amir Talai; Blake Roman; Keith David; Kimiko Glenn; Krystina Alabado; Christian Borle; Joel Perez	3:08
Total length:			9:51

=== Notes ===
- The singles appear as tracks 1 and 7, respectively, on the complete edition of the soundtrack. The rest of the tracks appear in the same order as they do on the EPs.

== Personnel ==
- Krystina Alabado – artist
- Stephanie Beatriz – artist, performer, vocals
- Lilah Behling – music editor
- Christian Borle – artist, performer, vocals, speaker
- Alex Brightman – artist, performer, vocals
- Lilli Cooper – artist, vocals
- Darren Criss – artist, vocals
- Keith David – artist, performer, vocals
- Kimiko Glenn – artist, performer, vocals
- Justin Goldner – bass, electric bass, guitar, acoustic guitar, electric guitar, mandolin
- Sam Haft – artist, performer, songwriter, background vocals, producer
- Erika Henningsen – artist, performer, vocals, speaker
- Keith Horn – arranger/orchestrator
- James Monroe Iglehart – artist, vocals
- Jeremy Jordan – artist, performer, vocals
- Leslie Kritzer – artist, performer
- Mick Lauer – performer
- Patina Miller – artist, vocals
- Shoba Narayan – artist, vocals
- Joel Perez – artist, performer, speaker
- Blake Roman – artist, performer, vocals
- Daphne Rubin-Vega – artist, performer, vocals
- Amir Talai – artist, performer, vocals, speaker
- Andrew Underberg – artist, performer, songwriter, producer
- Jessica Vosk – artist, vocals

== Charts ==
=== Weekly charts ===
Weekly chart performance for Hazbin Hotel (Original Soundtrack)
Chart (2024)	Peak position
Austrian Albums (Ö3 Austria)	11
Belgian Albums (Ultratop Flanders)	30
Belgian Albums (Ultratop Wallonia)	44
Canadian Albums (Billboard)	14
Danish Albums (Hitlisten)	29
Dutch Albums (Album Top 100)	21
Finnish Albums (Suomen virallinen lista)	34
Hungarian Albums (MAHASZ)	21
Italian Albums (FIMI)	59
Japanese Digital Albums (Oricon)	6
Japanese Hot Albums (Billboard Japan)	26
Lithuanian Albums (AGATA)	22
New Zealand Albums (RMNZ)	6
Norwegian Albums (VG-lista)	17
Portuguese Albums (AFP)	40
Spanish Albums (Promusicae)	54
Swedish Albums (Sverigetopplistan)	44
Swiss Albums (Schweizer Hitparade)	36
UK Compilation Albums (Official Charts)	1
UK Album Downloads (Official Charts)	9
UK Soundtrack Albums (Official Charts)	1
UK Vinyl Albums (OCC)	30
US Billboard 200	13
US Comedy Albums (Billboard)	1
US Soundtrack Albums (Billboard)	1

Weekly chart performance for Hazbin Hotel Original Soundtrack (Pt. 1)
Chart (2024)	Peak position
Canadian Albums (Billboard)	84
Japanese Digital Albums (Oricon)	15
Lithuanian Albums (AGATA)	29
Polish Albums (ZPAV)	37
UK Album Downloads (Official Charts)	11
UK Soundtrack Albums (Official Charts)	9
US Billboard 200	95
US Comedy Albums (Billboard)	2
US Soundtrack Albums (Billboard)	3

Weekly chart performance for Hazbin Hotel Original Soundtrack (Pt. 2)
Chart (2024)	Peak position
Japanese Digital Albums (Oricon)	12
US Billboard 200	189
US Comedy Albums (Billboard)	2
US Soundtrack Albums (Billboard)	5

Weekly chart performance for Hazbin Hotel Original Soundtrack (Pt. 3)
Chart (2024)	Peak position
Japanese Digital Albums (Oricon)	13
US Comedy Albums (Billboard)	4

=== Year-end charts ===
2024 year-end chart performance for Hazbin Hotel (Original Soundtrack)
Chart (2024)	Position
US Billboard 200	181
US Comedy Albums (Billboard)	1
US Soundtrack Albums (Billboard)	4

2025 year-end chart performance for Hazbin Hotel (Original Soundtrack)
Chart (2025)	Position
US Comedy Albums (Billboard)	1

Year-end chart performance for Hazbin Hotel Original Soundtrack (Pt. 1)
Chart (2024)	Position
US Comedy Albums (Billboard)	9

Year-end chart performance for Hazbin Hotel Original Soundtrack (Pt. 2)
Chart (2024)	Position
US Comedy Albums (Billboard)	14

== Certifications ==
Region	Certification	Certified units/sales
United Kingdom (BPI)	Silver	71,979
