= Alastor the Radio Demon =

Fictional character from Hazbin Hotel

Alastor
- Hazbin Hotel character
- Alastor as seen in Hazbin Hotel season 1
- First appearance: Hazbin Hotel: "That's Entertainment" (2019) (pilot debut); "Overture" (2024) (series debut)
- Created by: Vivienne Medrano
- Voiced by: Edward Bosco (2019); Gabriel C. Brown (2019; singing voice); Amir Talai (2024–present)

In-universe information
- Alias: The Radio Demon
- Species: Human (previously); Sinner
- Origin: New Orleans

Alastor the Radio Demon is a fictional character created by Vivienne "VivziePop" Medrano who primarily appears in the American musical adult animated series Hazbin Hotel. He was voiced by Edward Bosco and Gabriel C. Brown in the pilot, and by Amir Talai in the animated series since 2024. A constantly-smiling sinner, Alastor returns after a seven-year absence as one of the overlords of Hell to help run a hotel known as the Hazbin Hotel, a halfway house founded by Charlie Morningstar, meant to rehabilitate the souls of those in Hell and help them earn a place in Heaven. Alastor seeks to guide and control Charlie. For a time, his soul is under the control of fellow overlord Rosie; he is later freed from her grasp. He is often accompanied by the hotel's bartender Husk (whose soul he owns) and housekeeper Niffty, and he is considered a rival by fellow overlord Vox and Charlie's father, Lucifer.

The character has received a positive critical reception, receiving particular attention as a prominent asexual character in media.

== Conception and creation ==
Alastor was created by Medrano during her time at School of Visual Arts in New York City, appearing unnamed on her DeviantArt page around 2007. He was planned to be incorporated into her 2012 webcomic series ZooPhobia as a supporting character in a planned Angels and Demons story arc following his formal creation in 2011; on the arc's cancellation in 2016 and subsequent redevelopment as Hazbin Hotel, Alastor's full ZooPhobia design would not see publication.

=== Design and voice ===
In the unpublished ZooPhobia story arc Angels and Demons, Alastor was depicted as a black-and-red demonic deer able to transform into a humanoid form. He was described as "enjoy[ing] making deals and tricking mortals into service". He was a member of the "Demon Misfit Gang", who would later become the main cast of Hazbin Hotel. Short comics about ZooPhobia published to Medrano's DeviantArt and Tumblr pages would see Alastor attempt to take the place of fellow deer-boy Autumn, and to convince Damian (the webcomic's Prince of Hell) to make a deal with him, while himself being in love with "KayCee", an all-powerful ancient being.

In the Hazbin Hotel pilot, Alastor was entirely human, save for a few deer-like characteristics, including hooves and antlers. He wore a red suitcoat and had an eternal smile of sharp teeth. He was confirmed to be asexual by Medrano on her Twitter account, which was alluded to in the series itself in "Hello Rosie!". Alastor's voice actor Amir Talai has also described the character as embodying the characteristics of the "Tumblr sexyman".

Alastor was a radio show host in his life, and he died at some point in the 1930s. Upon his arrival in Hell, he gained immense amounts of power very quickly, overthrowing overlords that had dominated for centuries. His voice reflects who he was in life, having a radio static effect over it most of the time, and sound effects common in radio shows of the time occasionally play while he is speaking.

Prior to Hazbin Hotel's full series debut, Medrano described Alastor as a mixed-race Creole from New Orleans and an only child.

In the pilot of Hazbin Hotel, Edward Bosco was cast as the speaking voice of Alastor, and Gabriel C. Brown was cast as his singing voice. In the series, Bosco and Brown were replaced by Amir Talai.

== Fictional character biography ==
=== "That's Entertainment" (2019) ===
Alastor made his first full appearance in "That's Entertainment", the Hazbin Hotel pilot episode. Presented as an overlord of Hell, Alastor visits the "Happy Hotel" after witnessing Charlie Morningstar's televised interview about the establishment. He offers his services to help run the hotel, and states that he believes redeeming sinners is an impossible task, and he is only there to watch people try and fail to redeem themselves for his own entertainment, due to boredom with his own life. He summons two sinners, Niffty and Husk, to serve as the hotel's maid and bartender, respectively. After renovating the hotel in a musical number ("Alastor's Reprise"), Alastor uses his power to fend off an attacking Sir Pentious, before renaming the hotel the "Hazbin Hotel".

=== "A Day in the Afterlife" (2020) ===
Alastor returned in a starring role in "A Day in the Afterlife" (alternatively titled "The Radio Demon"), an official webcomic published on October 19, 2020. The comic explored a typical day for Alastor at an unspecified point in his afterlife. While attempting to purchase venison from a butcher, Alastor witnesses the butcher attempting to kill a sinner. He saves her life and consumes the butcher.

=== Hazbin Hotel (2024–present) ===
==== Season 1 (2024) ====
Alastor assists Charlie in running her redemption hotel. In "Overture", one week after the events of the pilot, Alastor notes it to have been "some time" since he was active in Hell. In "Radio Killed the Video Star", after Alastor fends off another attack by Sir Pentious, Alastor's rival Vox learns that Alastor has returned, noting that Alastor has been absent for seven years. After losing a broadcast debate with him ("Stayed Gone"), Vox and the other "Vees" (Velvette and Valentino) seek to prevent Alastor from making a deal with Charlie, and send Sir Pentious into the hotel to spy on him. In "Scrambled Eggs", Vaggie asks Alastor to look after Sir Pentious' egg minions, which he allows to accompany him to a meeting with the other overlords of Hell. After Velvette insinuates at the meeting that Carmilla Carmine killed an angel during the last Extermination (an annual purge of the souls of Hell by Heaven's army, led by Adam), Alastor orders one of the egg minions to spy on Carmilla and confirm this claim to be true. The egg returned soon after with confirmation.

Alastor showing his demon form to Husk

In "Masquerade", Husk is revealed to have once been an overlord of Hell, who made a deal with Alastor to keep his power in exchange for his soul. In "Dad Beat Dad", after Charlie's father Lucifer arrives at the hotel and isn't impressed, he clashes with Alastor over who is the better father figure to Charlie ("Hell's Greatest Dad"), before being interrupted by Alastor's friend Mimzy. Distrustful of Mimzy, Husk takes Alastor aside to remind him not to trust her motives. On being brushed off as a "pet", Husk mentions how Alastor is "on a leash" to someone else, which Alastor threatens him never to mention again. After several loan shark demons attack the hotel in search of Mimzy, Alastor uses his powers to kill them and remind Hell of his power, before ordering Mimzy to leave. In "Hello Rosie!", following Charlie failing to pitch the hotel to Heaven again, with one month to go until the annual Extermination, Alastor convinces her to make a deal with him, telling her about Carmilla killing an angel, in exchange for a binding future favor. After Charlie sends Vaggie to acquire information from Carmilla, Alastor brings Charlie to see his friend Rosie, the overlord of Hell in charge of Cannibal Town, and they convince the cannibals to serve as an army to defend the hotel against the angels ("Ready for This").

In "The Show Must Go On", the night before the Extermination, Alastor reminisces on the previous six months with Niffty, noting that one "could get used to" the residents of the hotel. On the Extermination's arrival the next day, a war between the angels and sinners ensues, and Alastor faces Adam himself. Overconfident, Alastor is badly wounded by Adam and forced to flee; in the aftermath of the battle, as the Vees celebrate Alastor's assumed loss and plot to take over Hell, a desperate Alastor hopes for freedom from his previous deal and control over Hell, before cleaning himself up "with a smile" and reuniting with Charlie and her friends ("Finale").

==== Season 2 (2025) ====
Alastor as a human in early 20th century New Orleans

Alastor's backstory is revealed in "It's A Deal". Prior to his death, he was a biracial radio show host and serial killer in New Orleans in the 1930s. He made a deal with Rosie before he died, asking her to grant him the power to be the most powerful sinner in Hell. She allows this, under the condition that his soul will belong to her until he does something for her in return. He dies shortly after this deal is struck, being shot by a hunter who mistook him for a deer while Alastor was hiding a body in a forest.

In the present day, Alastor continues to assist the hotel. In "It's A Deal", he gets into a battle with the Vees that goes poorly, ending in Alastor striking a deal with Vox, wherein Vox will own Alastor so long as the former leaves the hotel alone and doesn't touch Charlie again. In the season finale "Curtain Call," Alastor asks Charlie to do him the favor of saying that Vox is the strongest sinner in Hell, using his favor gained in season one. This frees Alastor's soul from his deal with Rosie, which is now void, as he is not the strongest sinner in Hell. Vox then briefly touches Charlie's shoulders, freeing Alastor from his deal with Vox as well due to wordplay. The two battle, and Vox is eventually defeated. Alastor returns to the hotel once more, though his intentions have changed, as he is no longer bound by any deals. He is seen eyeballing Lucifer; knowing now Lucifer can't harm sinners despite being the king of Hell.

== Promotion and reception ==
Since 2018, official clothing and merchandise based around Alastor and the cast of Hazbin Hotel designed by Medrano have been available intermittently from Shark Robot LLC. In 2024, an emote entitled "Reaper's Showtime" was added to the video game Fortnite, depicting the player character dancing with a scythe matching Alastor's color scheme, while playing the fan song "Insane". "Insane" was sung by Black Gryph0n, the singing voice of Alastor for the pilot episode.

Alastor's character in the show's pilot was received positively. Esther Liberman of BeLatina described him as "caricaturesque, impossibly rotten and flatter, like a perverse version of a third-generation descendant", while Dan Short of Animated Views called Alastor the "show-stealer" as one who is "charismatic and extravagant with smile-inducing flare while making it subtly clear he is as evil as he's feared to be", complimenting Edward Bosco's "magnificent" vocal performance and Gabriel C. Brown's "wonderfully inspired" singing voice. Reviewer Sean Cubillas for CBR described him as the embodiment of "dark humor at its quietest and best".

Alastor's character in the animated series was also received positively. Hope Mullinax of Collider praised him as "the most delightful enigma that keeps the audience guessing if he's a friend or an antagonist waiting in the wings. Or both!", while also complimenting the "phenomenal" sound design behind Alastor and Vox, with the "shifting static of radio and VHS tracking buzz from nostalgic television sets heighten[ing] their subtextual emotions". Another reviewer, Mae Abdulbaki of ScreenRant, has said he has "a particularly intriguing character" during the series, noting his "mysterious and seemingly dangerous, yet protective and snarky" attitude. MXDWN additionally praised the "incredible chemistry" between Jeremy Jordan as Lucifer and Talai as Alastor.

== Appearances in other media ==
Gabriel C. Brown, the singing voice of Alastor in the pilot, provided vocals as Alastor in several fan-made music videos, including "Insane" in June 2021, which was reviewed by One Piece creator Eiichiro Oda as his "second-favorite song of 2023". On June 19, 2026, Brown uploaded a music video for the song animated by Helluva Boss animator Luximus, before the video was removed from YouTube on June 27 following a copyright removal request by Amazon MGM Studios. In 2020, Hazbin Hotel and Helluva Boss songwriter Sam Haft released "Alastor's Game", in which Haft voiced Alastor.

From 2019 to 2023, Bosco and Brown would reprise their roles as Alastor in a series of skits in HuniCast, a livestreamed podcast series co-hosted by Angel Dust's pilot voice actor, Michael Kovach, and Hazbin Hotel pilot animator Ashley Nichols, often featuring the cast and crew of Hazbin Hotel and SpindleHorse Toons as guests.

In October 2026, Fortnite announced its rollout of new collaboration skins for its Fortnitemares event, with Alastor, Charlie Morningstar and Vaggie being purchasable skins in the Fortnite item shop.

== See also ==
- LGBTQ themes in Western animation
- List of animated series with LGBTQ characters: 2020–2024
- List of fictional asexual characters
- List of demons in fiction
