= Stayed Gone =

2024 Hazbin Hotel song

Song by Christian Borle, Amir Talai, Joel Perez, Sam Haft

from the album Hazbin Hotel Original Soundtrack (Part 1)
- Released: 2024
- Genre: Electro swing
- Length: 3:00
- Label: A24 Music
- Songwriters: Sam Haft; Andrew Underberg
- Producers: Sam Haft; Andrew Underberg

The YouTube video thumbnail for the song

"Stayed Gone" is an electro swing pop song from the American adult animated musical comedy television series Hazbin Hotel. It is sung primarily by Christian Borle (playing the character Vox) and Amir Talai (playing Alastor), with additional parts by Joel Perez (as Valentino) and Sam Haft.

The song is featured in "Radio Killed the Video Star", the second episode of the show's first season. On January 18, 2024, the song was released on Spotify, and has since accumulated 95 million streams. On February 1, 2024, Andrew Underberg released the song on YouTube, which has since accumulated over 22 million views. The song also peaked at number eleven on the U.S. Bubbling Under Hot 100 chart.

The song is a broadcast debate song between Vox and Alastor, as both insult each other and wish to make the other wish that Alastor "stayed gone".

== Chart performance ==
Weekly chart performance for "Stayed Gone"
Chart (2024)	Peak position
Canada Hot 100 (Billboard)	85
New Zealand Hot Singles (RMNZ)	21
UK Indie (Official Charts)	29
UK Independent Singles Breakers (Official Charts)	13
US Bubbling Under Hot 100 (Billboard)	11
