= Vox (Hazbin Hotel) =

Fictional character from Hazbin Hotel

- Hazbin Hotel character
- Vox as seen in Hazbin Hotel
- First appearance: "That's Entertainment" (2019) (pilot debut; cameo) "Radio Killed the Video Star" (2024) (series debut)
- Created by: Vivienne Medrano
- Voiced by: Christian Borle

In-universe information
- Full name: Vincent Whittman
- Alias: Vox
- Species: Human (previously); Sinner
- Gender: Male
- Occupation: Media overlord; leader of the Vees
- Affiliation: The Vees; Overlords
- Significant others: Valentino (on and off)
- Origin: Earth

Vox is a fictional character created by Vivienne "VivziePop" Medrano and one of the main antagonists in the American musical adult animated series Hazbin Hotel, serving as the primary antagonist of season 2.

Voiced and sung by Christian Borle, he is one of Hell's overlords and the de facto leader of a media-oriented group of overlords referred to as the Vees, consisting of Vox, Valentino, and Velvette. Vox is portrayed as a technology-savvy, narcissistic, broadcast-centric overlord who uses propaganda and mass media to exert influence.

== Lead and character concept ==
Vox is designed around television and electronic motifs, often appearing with TV screens and broadcast hardware integrated into his design. Within the series' fictional setting, he runs a media conglomerate known as VoxTek that controls broadcasts and influences public opinion among Hell's citizens. Vox functions narratively as a foil to more traditional overlords; critics and interviews have described him as representing modern media monopolies and the manipulative power of spectacle.

== Development ==
Medrano in several promotional interviews has emphasized Vox's increased narrative importance in season 2. At San Diego Comic-Con 2025, Medrano indicated that Vox would be more prominent in the second season, describing him as a principal antagonist whose arc expands beyond his earlier appearances.

== Fictional biography ==
=== Pilot (2019) & Season 1 (2024) ===
Vox made a cameo appearance in the pilot episode of Hazbin Hotel, "That's Entertainment", and appeared more frequently in the show's first season as a recurring antagonist. The character's primary characteristic is his rivalry with Alastor the Radio Demon, one of the show's main characters. In the universe of the show, Vox freaks out upon learning of Alastor's resurgence. After learning Alastor has formed an alliance with Charlie Morningstar, the Princess of Hell, Vox sends the demon Sir Pentious as a spy into the Hazbin Hotel. However, Pentious is discovered, and ends up willingly choosing redemption at the hotel. Vox then appears in the season finale, expressing sheer joy at seeing Alastor be bested by Adam, the leader of the Exorcist angels, and later intending to use Hell's victory over Heaven to take control.

=== Season 2 (2025) ===
Vox and the Vees play a more central role in season 2's primary conflict as the season's main antagonist, which features widescale media manipulation and political maneuvering across Hell and into Heaven, as Vox attempts to use the current relationship between Heaven and Hell to take over both realms for himself, ultimately rallying an army of Sinner followers to wage war on Heaven. Over the course of the second season, Vox's hunger for power slowly builds a rift between him and the other Vees, who suspect him of throwing them aside for his own personal gain.

In episode 4, Alastor turns himself over to Vox with the one requirement that Vox not lay a hand on Charlie, it is also revealed that Vox had proposed a partnership between himself and Alastor; Alastor's cruel and mocking rejection of the idea is the catalyst for their rivalry. Vox gleefully torments Alastor and continues gaining support from the rest of Hell, formally declaring war on Heaven. In episode 6, Vox kidnaps Angel Dust, revealing that he hypnotized the latter and used him to spy on the hotel. In episode 7, it reveals Vox's backstory; Vox was a weatherman named Vincent Whittman in the 1950s when television is invented, he committed a series of murders to work his way up the television industry, to be in the spotlight and be loved by everyone as a star, eventually murdering his boss Bob and becoming the leader of an unnamed TV network. Vincent used the opportunity to start a television-themed cult, but died when he was violently electrocuted along with his followers by a suspended television monitor that fell from above onto his head.

In the final episode of the season, he gains massive amounts of power and prepares to use a massive cannon nicknamed 'The Might Of Lilith' (powered by an unwilling Lucifer) against Heaven, but in his excitement he puts his hands on Charlie's shoulders, thereby breaking his deal with Alastor. Alastor decides to engage Vox in combat; in response, he overloads the cannon with power, to the point that, if fired, will wipe out all of Hell. Refusing to die over Vox's vengeance against Alastor, his fellow Vees finally turn against him and join the rest of Hell in destroying the cannon, resulting in his defeat. When all is said and done, Vox is reduced to nothing more than his monitor head, his body ripped off by Velvette and Valentino and his reputation ruined by his actions.

== Reception ==
Vox is frequently read as a satirical embodiment of broadcast power and corporate media control. Reviewers note that his public spectacle and psychological manipulation serve as narrative devices to explore themes of propaganda and the intoxicating reach of mass entertainment in the show's diegesis. Critical reception has noted the shift in focus toward the Vees and their leader, Vox, in season 2. Reviews and recaps describe the Vees' takeover plot as central to the season's escalation of stakes, and many outlets singled out Vox’s role when summarizing the second season's major conflicts.

Coverage from People and Decider has also framed the series' expanded seasons as focusing on overlord politics, and those reports note Vox's plans as a drive for the major story events of season 2.

== See also ==
- LGBTQ themes in Western animation
- List of animated series with LGBTQ characters: 2020–2024
- List of bisexual characters in animation
- List of demons in fiction
