= Poison (Hazbin Hotel song) =

2024 Hazbin Hotel song

Single by Blake Roman

from the album Hazbin Hotel (Original Soundtrack)
- Released: January 5, 2024
- Genre: Alternative dance; pop rock
- Length: 2:07
- Label: A24 Music
- Songwriters: Sam Haft; Andrew Underberg
- Producers: Sam Haft; Andrew Underberg

Music video
- "Poison" on YouTube

"Poison" is an alternative dance pop rock song from the American adult animated musical comedy television series Hazbin Hotel. It is sung by Blake Roman playing the character Angel Dust.

The song is featured in "Masquerade", the fourth episode of the show's first season. On January 5, 2024, the song was released as a single prior to the release of the first season, and has since accumulated 34 million views and 153 million streams, respectively, on YouTube and Spotify. The song also peaked at number two on the U.S. Bubbling Under Hot 100 chart.

The song is about the darkness involved in a psychologically abusive relationship, combined with how traumatizing a sexually abusive relationship is to a person, continuing themes from the 2020 Hazbin Hotel song and music video "Addict".

An official remix by The Living Tombstone (TLT), with a new hyperpop instrumental and featuring Joel Perez as Valentino, was released on April 1, 2024, Angel Dust's birthday.

"Poison" (remix)

Single by Blake Roman and The Living Tombstone
- Released: April 1, 2024
- Genre: Alternative dance
- Length: 2:37
- Label: A24 Music
- Songwriters: Sam Haft; Andrew Underberg
- Producer: Yoav Landau

Music video
- "Poison (Official Remix)" on YouTube

== Composition ==
"Poison" is an alternative dance song set in the key of C minor, with a tempo of 150 beats per minute, and a chord progression of C minor, A♭, and F minor.

== Charts ==
=== Weekly charts ===
Weekly chart performance for "Poison"
Chart (2024)	Peak position
Canada (Canadian Hot 100)	69
New Zealand Hot Singles (RMNZ)	24
UK Singles (Official Charts)	55
UK Indie (Official Charts)	14
U.S. Bubbling Under Hot 100 (Billboard)	2
U.S. Hot Alternative Songs (Billboard)	9
U.S. Hot Rock & Alternative Songs (Billboard)	14

=== Year-end charts ===
Year-end chart performance for "Poison"
Chart (2024)	Position
U.S. Hot Rock & Alternative Songs (Billboard)	59
U.S. Hot Rock Songs (Billboard)	49
U.S. Hot Alternative Songs (Billboard)	44
