= Hell's Greatest Dad =

2024 Hazbin Hotel song

Song by Jeremy Jordan, Amir Talai, Erika Henningsen, Kimiko Glenn, Sarah Stiles

from the album Hazbin Hotel Original Soundtrack (Part 2)
- Released: 2024
- Genre: Electro swing
- Length: 2:13
- Songwriters: Sam Haft; Andrew Underberg
- Producers: Sam Haft; Andrew Underberg

Music video
- "Hell's Greatest Dad" on YouTube

The YouTube video thumbnail for the song

"Hell's Greatest Dad" is an electro swing song from the American adult animated musical comedy television series Hazbin Hotel. It is sung primarily by Jeremy Jordan (playing the character Lucifer Morningstar) and Amir Talai (playing Alastor), with additional parts by Erika Henningsen (as Charlie Morningstar), Kimiko Glenn (as Niffty) and Sarah Stiles (as Mimzy). The song is featured in "Dad Beat Dad", the fifth episode of the show's first season.

On January 26, 2024, the song and lyrics were published to YouTube and Spotify by Amazon Prime Video, and have since accumulated 77 and 110 million views and streams on both platforms, respectively. The song's release on YouTube has also become Amazon Prime Video's most-viewed video on their channel, surpassing the trailer for The Lord of the Rings: The Rings of Power by over 20 million views. As of 2026, The song reached 100 million views.

== Charts ==
Weekly chart performance for "Hell's Greatest Dad"
Chart (2024)	Peak position
Canada (Canadian Hot 100)	74
New Zealand (Recorded Music NZ)	23
UK Singles (Official Charts)	98
UK Indie (Official Charts)	24
UK Indie Break	8
U.S. Bubbling Under Hot 100 (Billboard)	9
