= Loser, Baby =

2024 Hazbin Hotel song

Song by Keith David and Blake Roman

from the album Hazbin Hotel Original Soundtrack (Part 1)
- Released: 2024
- Genre: Jazz; rock
- Length: 2:55
- Label: A24 Music
- Songwriters: Sam Haft; Andrew Underberg
- Producers: Sam Haft; Andrew Underberg

Music video
- "Loser, Baby" on YouTube

The YouTube video thumbnail for the song

"Loser, Baby" is a song from the American adult animated musical comedy television series Hazbin Hotel. It is sung by Keith David (playing the character Husk) and Blake Roman (playing Angel Dust). The song is featured in "Masquerade", the fourth episode of the show's first season.

On January 19, 2024, the song and lyrics were published to YouTube and Spotify by Amazon Prime Video, and have since accumulated 46 million views and 181 million streams, respectively. The song also peaked at number one on the Billboard U.S. Bubbling Under Hot 100 chart. The song’s release on YouTube has also become Amazon Prime Video’s third most-viewed video on their channel.

== Composition ==
"Loser, Baby" is a jazz and rock song written in the key of E major.

== Reception ==
Angel Shaw of Screen Rant stated the song "perfectly represents everything the adult animated musical comedy series is about".

Charlotte Hansen, also from Screen Rant, ranked "Loser, Baby" the best song in the Hazbin Hotel television series, writing "while the song is very gritty and shows the brutal reality of living in Hell, it is also lighthearted as well with Angel Dust and Husk dancing to changing backgrounds as they celebrate who they are." The Economic Times wrote that the song "captures the essence of losers finding solace in each other's company within the depths of Hell".

== Charts ==
Weekly chart performance for "Loser, Baby"
Chart (2024)	Peak position
Canada (Canadian Hot 100)	65
New Zealand (Recorded Music NZ)	10
UK Singles (Official Charts)	53
UK Indie (Official Charts)	12
U.S. Bubbling Under Hot 100 (Billboard)	1
