= Angel Dust (Hazbin Hotel) =

Fictional character from Hazbin Hotel

- Hazbin Hotel character
- Angel Dust as seen in Hazbin Hotel season 1
- First appearance: "That's Entertainment"
- Created by: Vivienne Medrano
- Voiced by: Michael Kovach (2019-2020); Blake Roman (2024–present)

In-universe information
- Full name: Anthony
- Alias: Angel Dust
- Nickname: Angel
- Species: Human (previously); Sinner
- Gender: Male
- Occupation: Adult entertainer
- Family: Molly (twin sister); Arackniss (older brother)
- Origin: Earth
- Nationality: American
- Ethnicity: Italian

Anthony "Angel Dust", or simply Angel, is a fictional character created by Vivienne "VivziePop" Medrano who appears in the American adult animated musical series Hazbin Hotel. He was voiced by Michael Kovach in the pilot episode and by Blake Roman in the series since 2024.

Depicted with spider-like characteristics, Angel Dust performs as an adult film actor in gay pornography. He is of Italian origin and he is the first guest of the Hazbin Hotel. The hotel is a rehabilitation center founded by Hell's princess, Charlie Morningstar, with the goal of redeeming sinners so they may enter Heaven. Angel Dust's soul is owned by his boss, Valentino, a film producer with whom he shares a toxic and abusive relationship. The character has received positive critical reception.

== Development ==
=== Origins and concept ===
Vivienne Medrano created Angel Dust while studying at the School of Visual Arts in New York City. In early Tumblr posts published on Vivienne Medrano's Portfolio under the username "ZoophobiaCrazies", Medrano described Angel as an eccentric character related to Arackniss. She also stated that Angel was one of the few characters of hers associated with drug-related themes, and that the name "Angel" came to her while developing the character.

=== Design and characterization ===
In the pilot episode, Angel Dust is portrayed as a drug-addicted sex worker with a sarcastic and often insensitive personality who remains at the Hazbin Hotel primarily for its free accommodations.

The redesigned character design of Angel Dust for the series was first revealed on April 29, 2022, as part of the promotional rollout for Hazbin Hotel.

Despite the character's outwardly provocative and comedic demeanor, Blake Roman described Angel Dust in the 2024 series as a fiercely independent individual who attempts to control others' perceptions of him by leaning into assumptions surrounding his profession and personality.

==== Background and relationships ====
Angel Dust, whose real name is Anthony, is depicted as originating from an Italian-American criminal family. He has a twin sister, Molly, who resides in Heaven. Like her brother, she is also portrayed with spider-like physical characteristics.

He maintains a close friendship with Cherri Bomb, and the two are frequently depicted together throughout the series.

=== Voices ===
In the 2019 pilot episode of Hazbin Hotel, Michael Kovach voiced Angel Dust. For the series, which premiered in 2024, the character was recast with Blake Roman in the role.

Roman stated that voicing Angel Dust required balancing exaggerated and performative vocal delivery with emotionally intimate scenes, reflecting the contrast between the character's outward persona and his more vulnerable side. He also described being drawn to the role during the audition process, citing the character's complexity and the depth of the series' world-building. Series creator Vivienne Medrano praised Roman's casting, highlighting his vocal range, emotional performance, and singing ability as key factors in his selection for the role.

== Fictional character biography ==
=== "Chapter 1: Dirty Healings" (2019–2020) ===
In "Chapter 1: Dirty Healings", an official webcomic published from October 27, 2019 to July 7, 2020, how Charlie and Vaggie recruited Angel Dust as the first patron of their hotel is explored.

=== "That's Entertainment" (2019) ===
In the pilot episode of Hazbin Hotel, released on October 28, 2019, Angel Dust is introduced as a flamboyant and sarcastic pornographic actor living in Hell, as well as the first resident of the Hazbin Hotel, a rehabilitation project founded by Charlie Morningstar to redeem sinners and allow them to enter Heaven. Despite Charlie's hopes that he would become an example of redemption, Angel continues engaging in reckless and destructive behavior.

During the episode, Angel retrieves drugs that had been reserved for him from a vending machine, only for them to be stolen moments later by a thief who is crushed by falling debris, destroying the drugs in the process. Rather than reacting to the thief's death, Angel becomes upset over losing the narcotics, emphasizing his selfish and morally indifferent personality.

Later, Angel becomes involved in a turf war while Charlie is giving a live television interview promoting the hotel, damaging the public image of her project. After being confronted by Charlie and Vaggie over his actions, Angel dismisses the situation with jokes and sarcastic remarks instead of remorse. Throughout the pilot, he is portrayed as flirtatious, theatrical, and crude, frequently making sexual innuendos and mocking other characters, particularly during his confrontation with Sir Pentious.

=== Season 1 (2024) ===
In the first season, Angel Dust is introduced as a resident of the Hazbin Hotel and a pornographic film actor who initially joins Charlie's rehabilitation initiative with reluctance. Throughout the early episodes, he is portrayed as both a source of comedic relief and a character undergoing gradual development, with increasing focus on his personal struggles and emotional complexity.

In the episode "Masquerade", Angel Dust's abusive relationship with Valentino is explored in greater depth, depicting the power imbalance and control exerted over him. The episode features the song "Poison", which reflects his emotional state, and culminates in a moment of vulnerability and connection with Husk. This arc develops as he learns to stand up for himself, culminating in the episode "Welcome to Heaven", where he confronts Valentino and asserts that his boss has no control over him outside of work.

Ultimately, across the rest of the season, Angel Dust's characterization further develops, gradually revealing a more vulnerable side beneath his comedic and sexualized exterior. His portrayal balances humor with underlying themes of trauma and emotional struggle, contributing to his overall narrative arc within the series.

=== Season 2 (2025) ===
In the episode "Scream Rain", Husk visits a casino after being freed from Alastor's control following Vox's capture of him, where he encounters Angel Dust performing on stage in drag. The performance features the song "Losin' Streak". Afterwards, the two speak openly, acknowledging that redemption is a painful and gradual process. Later, Angel is called in for another "job", which is ultimately revealed to be a trap orchestrated by the Vees. During the episode, it is revealed that Vox had been hypnotizing Angel into spying on the Hazbin Hotel since the first season, resulting in the exposure of information regarding Charlie and Vaggie's plans, as well as Lucifer's weakness. By the end of the episode, Vox manipulates Angel into publicly denouncing the hotel and endorsing his uprising against Heaven.

In the second-season finale, as part of Charlie's plan to prove that redemption is possible and prevent a war, Cherri Bomb and Husk are tasked with locating and rescuing Angel Dust after he is taken to VoxTek. When they find him, Angel remains under the Vees' influence. In an attempt to stop the rescue, Valentino manipulates Angel into turning against Cherri and Husk, even forcing him to seize Cherri by the neck. By the episode's conclusion, Angel is freed from Vox's manipulation, but chooses to return to Valentino out of fear of putting his friends in danger, recalling that he nearly strangled Cherri while under the Vees' control.And the fact Valentino still has his soul.

== Reception ==
=== Pilot ===
Angel Dust's character in the pilot episode received limited but generally positive commentary. Dan Short of Animated Views described Angel Dust as "flamboyant and unabashed" and stated that the character remained appealing despite his "most despicable" moments being "quite often and intentional". Short also praised Michael Kovach's vocal performance, noting that he "clearly sounds like he's having a blast going as far over-the-top as he can with Angel Dust".

=== Series ===
The portrayal of Angel Dust in the animated series, which premiered in 2024, has received mostly positive critical reception. Mae Abdulbaki of ScreenRant described Angel Dust as an engaging character whose development throughout the series' early episodes added emotional depth to the story, while also bringing levity and charm despite its darker subject matter. Writing for The A.V. Club, Jenna Scherer praised Angel Dust's storyline in the episode "Masquerade", particularly its depiction of his abusive relationship with Valentino. Scherer additionally highlighted Blake Roman's performance in the musical number "Poison" and Angel Dust's duet with Husk, voiced by Keith David, stating that the episode approached its mature themes with emotional honesty. Likewise, Dais Johnston of Inverse highlighted the song "Poison" for its exploration of Angel Dust's abusive relationship with Valentino, praising the series for addressing serious subject matter without losing its musical and comedic tone. Johnston further commented positively on Angel Dust's emotional interactions with Husk, particularly during their duet. Brian Kitson of The Cosmic Circus named Angel Dust among the series' standout characters, citing the balance between his comedic persona and emotional depth. Kitson noted that the character became increasingly multidimensional throughout the early episodes, revealing vulnerability beneath his vulgar humor and outward confidence, and described Blake Roman's portrayal as one of the show's greatest strengths. In a similar vein, Hope Mullinax of Collider commended Roman's performance, highlighting the emotional vulnerability and complexity he brought to the character. Mullinax described Roman's portrayal as "complicated and uncomfortable exactly when it needs to be", while additionally praising his chemistry with Keith David and favorably comparing his interpretation of the role to Michael Kovach's earlier performance.

== Appearances in other media ==
In February 2020, producer Silva Hound released the Angel Dust-inspired fan song "Addict", featuring vocals by Michael Kovach, who originated the voice role of Angel Dust in the pilot episode of Hazbin Hotel, and Chi-Chi as Cherri Bomb. An animated music video, developed by Vivienne Medrano, was released on YouTube in July of the same year, further expanding on the character. By November 2023, the video had surpassed 150 million views.

== See also ==
- LGBTQ themes in Western animation
- List of animated series with LGBTQ characters: 2020–2024
- List of gay characters in animation
- List of cross-dressing characters in animated series
- List of demons in fiction
