= Blake Roman =

American stage and voice actor (born 1995)

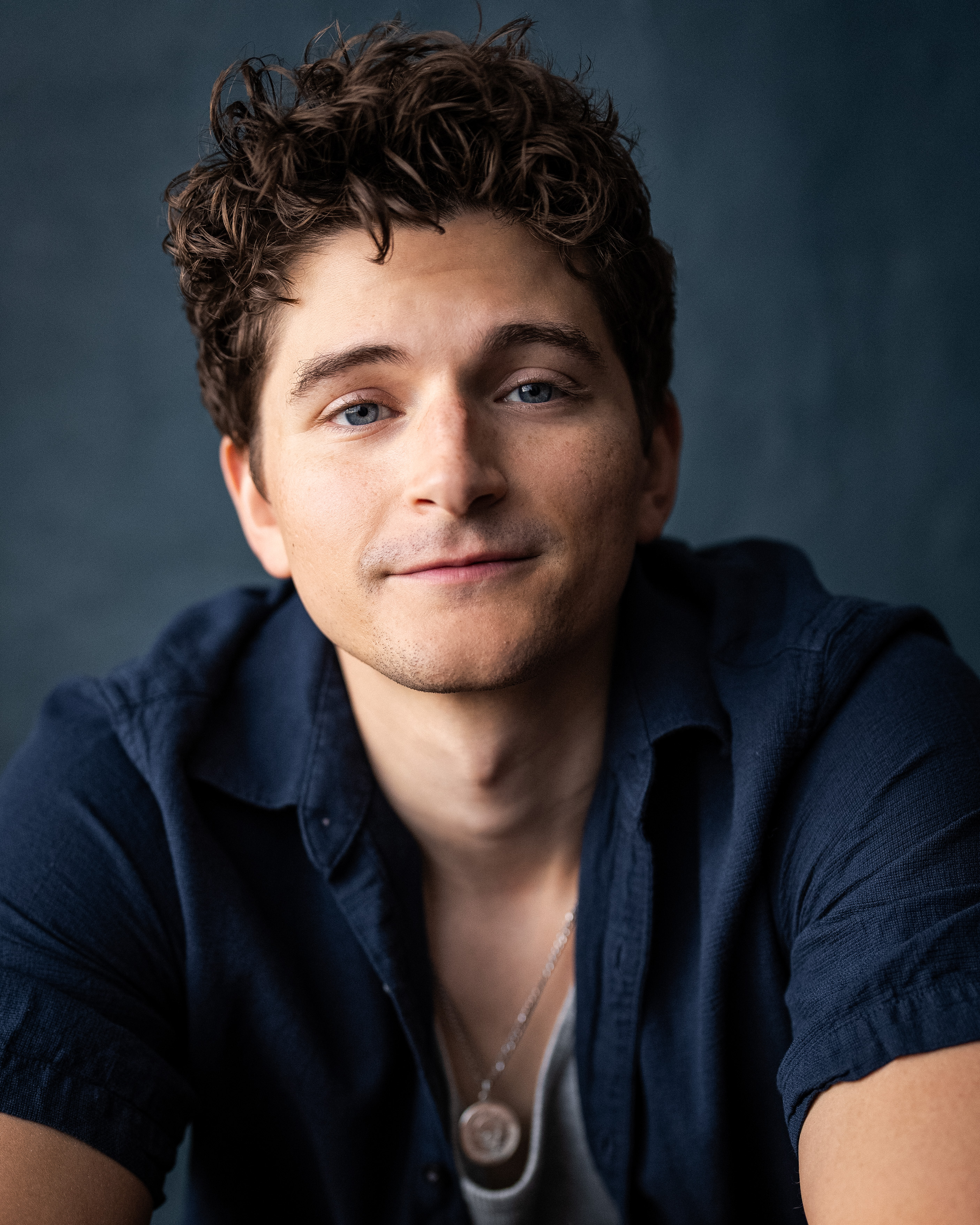
- Roman in 2024
- Born: Blake Roman Bojewski; December 20, 1995 (age 30); Erie, Pennsylvania, U.S.
- Education: University of Michigan
- Occupations: Actor; singer
- Years active: 2019–present

Blake Roman Bojewski (born December 20, 1995) is an American actor and singer, best known for his performance in the Broadway musical, Harmony: A New Musical about the Comedian Harmonists, and for voicing Angel Dust on the Amazon Prime Video series Hazbin Hotel.

== Early life and career ==
Roman was born on December 20, 1995, in Erie, Pennsylvania, United States. He attended Fairview High School. He graduated from the University of Michigan, receiving a Bachelor of Fine Arts in musical theatre. After graduating, he auditioned for the animated series Hazbin Hotel, eventually landing the role of Angel Dust and the Egg Boiz.

== Personal life ==
Roman is openly pansexual.

== Theatre credits ==
Credit in bold indicate Broadway production:

| Year | Title | Role | Theatre | Director(s) | Ref. |
|---|---|---|---|---|---|
| 2017 | The Little Mermaid | Ensemble | University of Michigan | Linda Goodrich | |
| 2017 | One Hit Wonder | Ensemble | University of Michigan | Hunter Foster | |
| 2017 | Newsies | Crutchie | Wagon Wheel Theatre | Scott Michaels | |
| 2017 | Footloose | Willard | Wagon Wheel Theatre | Scott Michaels | |
| 2017 | Into the Woods | Jack | Wagon Wheel Theatre | Scott Michaels | |
| 2018 | Our Town | George Gibbs | Theatre Aspen Hurst Theatre | Hunter Foster | |
| 2018 | Ragtime | Ensemble | Theatre Aspen Hurst Theatre | Mark Matino | |
| 2018 | Sweet Charity | Vittorio Vidal | University of Michigan | Lydia Mendelssohn | |
| 2019 | Sweeney Todd | Anthony Hope | University of Michigan | Vince Cardinal | |
| 2022 | **Harmony** | **Chopin** | National Yiddish Theatre Folksbiene | Warren Carlyle | |
| **2023** | **Harmony** | **Chopin** | **Ethel Barrymore Theatre** | Warren Carlyle | |

== Filmography ==
=== Television ===
| Year | Title | Role | Notes | Ref. |
|---|---|---|---|---|
| 2023 | Blue Bloods | Peter Guerrero | Season 13; episode "Past History" | |
| 2024–present | Hazbin Hotel | Angel Dust, Egg Boiz | Main role | |

=== Video games ===
| Year | Title | Role | Notes | Ref. |
|---|---|---|---|---|
| 2026 | Grand Theft Auto VI | Bryce McNaughton | Voice role | |

=== Web ===
| Year | Title | Role | Notes | Ref. |
|---|---|---|---|---|
| 2023 | Helluva Boss | Imp Mariachi | Voice role; episode "Western Energy" | |
| 2025 | A Night at the Park | Randall Zevo | Short film | |

== Discography ==
=== Singles ===
==== As lead artist ====
List of singles, with selected chart positions, showing year released and album name
| Title | Year | Peak chart positions | | | | Album |
| Title | Year | US Bub. | CAN | NZ Hot | UK | Album |
|---|---|---|---|---|---|---|
| "Poison" | 2024 | 2 | 69 | 24 | 96 | Hazbin Hotel (Original Soundtrack) |

==== As featured artist ====
List of singles as featured artist, showing year released and album name
| Title | Year | Album |
|---|---|---|
| "Happy Day in Hell" (Erika Henningsen, Stephanie Beatriz, and Sam Haft featuring Mick Lauer, Keith David, Andrew Underberg, and Blake Roman) | 2023 | Hazbin Hotel (Original Soundtrack) |

=== Other charted songs ===
List of other charted songs, with selected chart positions, showing year released and album name
| Title | Year | Peak chart positions | | | | | Album |
| Title | Year | US | CAN | IRE | NZ Hot | UK | Album |
|---|---|---|---|---|---|---|---|
| "Loser, Baby" (with Keith David) | 2024 | — (Note: "Loser, Baby" did not enter the Billboard Hot 100, but peaked at number 1 on the Bubbling Under Hot 100 chart.) | 65 | — | 10 | 77 | Hazbin Hotel Original Soundtrack (Part 1) |
| "Losin' Streak" | 2025 | 98 | 79 | 92 | 2 | 41 | Hazbin Hotel: Season Two (Original Soundtrack) |
| "Hear My Hope" (with Shoba Narayan, Erika Henningsen, Keith David, Kimiko Glenn, Stephanie Beatriz, Kevin Del Aguila, Krystina Alabado, Jessica Vosk, Patrick Stump, Alex Brightman, Daphne Rubin-Vega, James Monroe Iglehart, Andrew Durand, Leslie Kritzer, Amir Talai, Alex Newell, Joel Perez, Lilli Cooper, and Christian Borle) | 2025 | — | — | — | 20 | — | Hazbin Hotel: Season Two (Original Soundtrack) |
"—" denotes a recording that did not chart or was not released in that territory.
