= Hazbin Hotel =

American adult animated television series

- Genre: Musical; Black comedy; Comedy drama; Fantasy
- Created by: Vivienne Medrano
- Directed by: Vivienne Medrano
- Voices of: Stephanie Beatriz; Alex Brightman; Keith David; Kimiko Glenn; Erika Henningsen; Blake Roman; Amir Talai; Christian Borle
- Theme music composer: Parry Gripp
- Composers: Sam Haft; Andrew Underberg; Evan Alderete; Gooseworx; Brian Sadler
- Country of origin: United States
- Original language: English
- No. of seasons: 2
- No. of episodes: 16

Production
- Executive producers: Vivienne Medrano; Alli Reich; Scott Greenberg; Joel Kuwahara; Dana Tafoya-Cameron; Brett Coker
- Producers: Jes Anderson; Paula Haifley; Samantha Daley; Casey Rup; Anika Gallagher
- Editors: Henry Scott; Andy Thompson
- Running time: 23–36 minutes
- Production companies: SpindleHorse; Bento Box Entertainment; A24; Amazon MGM Studios (Note: Credited as Amazon Studios in season 1.)

Original release
- Network: YouTube
- Release: October 28, 2019 (pilot)
- Network: Amazon Prime Video
- Release: January 19, 2024 – present

Related
- Helluva Boss

Hazbin Hotel is an American adult animated musical black comedy television series created, directed, and executive-produced by Vivienne "VivziePop" Medrano. The series revolves around Charlie Morningstar, crown princess of Hell, on her quest to find a way for sinners to be "redeemed" and allowed into Heaven via her "Hazbin Hotel" as an alternative to Heaven's annual "extermination" of souls due to Hell's overpopulation. The series is produced by Medrano's company SpindleHorse in collaboration with A24, Amazon MGM Studios, and the animation studio Bento Box Entertainment.

The pilot episode was released on YouTube on October 28, 2019. The first season premiered on Amazon Prime Video on January 19, 2024, with its first episode also released on YouTube a day earlier for a limited time. The second season premiered on October 29, 2025. The series has been renewed for three additional seasons, with the fifth season set to serve as its last. The series has received generally positive reviews from critics. As of January 2024, Hazbin Hotel was the largest global debut for an animated series on Prime Video.

The popularity and success of the pilot allowed Medrano to create the spin-off series Helluva Boss, which began on November 25, 2019, with a pilot episode, followed by the premiere of its first season on October 31, 2020. The series features a different cast of characters within the same in-universe setting.

== Premise ==
The series follows Charlie Morningstar, the princess of Hell, as she sets about fulfilling her seemingly impossible dream of finding a way for sinners to be "redeemed" and allowed into Heaven, mainly via her "Hazbin Hotel", which aims to rehabilitate sinner demons. Due to overpopulation, Hell goes through an annual genocidal purge called "extermination" where angels called "Exorcists", armed with angelic weapons and led by Adam, descend from Heaven and kill sinners. Charlie finds this distressing, and wants to find a more peaceful solution to the overpopulation problem. Her goal is to have her clients "check out" from Hell as redeemed souls and be accepted into Heaven.

With the help of her devoted manager and girlfriend, Vaggie, and their reluctant first patron, Angel Dust, who is a pornographic film actor, she is determined to make her dream become a reality. But when her proposal on live television goes awry, her plan attracts the attention of the powerful "Radio Demon" Alastor who, finding her belief in redemption laughable, helps Charlie run the hotel for his own amusement.

== Voice cast and characters ==
=== Main ===
- Stephanie Beatriz as Vaggie/Vaggi
- Alex Brightman as Sir Pentious and Adam
- Keith David as Husk
- Kimiko Glenn as Niffty and Susan
- Erika Henningsen as Charlie Morningstar
- Blake Roman as Angel Dust and the Egg Boiz
- Amir Talai as Alastor and Tom Trench
- Christian Borle as Vox

=== Recurring ===
- Brandon Rogers as Katie Killjoy
- Jessica Vosk as Lute
- Lilli Cooper as Velvette
- Joel Perez as Valentino and Maestro
- James Monroe Iglehart as Zestial
- Daphne Rubin-Vega as Carmilla Carmine
- Jeremy Jordan as Lucifer Morningstar
- Krystina Alabado as Cherri Bomb and Salina
- Patina Miller as Sera
- Shoba Narayan as Emily
- Kevin Del Aguila as Baxter
- Patrick Stump as Abel and Hatchet

Sam Haft provides additional song vocals in multiple episodes

=== Guest ===
- Don Darryl Rivera as Travis
- Sarah Stiles as Mimzy
- Darren Criss as Saint Peter
- Leslie Rodriguez Kritzer as Rosie
- Liz Callaway as the Speaker of God
- Andrew Durand as Prick
- Alex Newell as Zeezi

Mick Lauer, Zach Hadel, and Richard Steven Horvitz provide additional guest voices

== Episodes ==
Season	Episodes	Originally released		
Season	Episodes	First released	Last released	Network
Pilot		October 28, 2019		YouTube
1	8	January 19, 2024	February 2, 2024	Amazon Prime Video
2	8	October 29, 2025	November 19, 2025	Amazon Prime Video

=== Pilot (2019) ===
Title	Directed by	Written by	Original release date
"That's Entertainment"	Vivienne Medrano	Dave Capdevielle, Raymond Hernandez & Vivienne Medrano	October 28, 2019
The day after the latest Extermination, princess of Hell Charlie opens the "Happy Hotel" with her girlfriend Vaggie to rehabilitate sinners and send them into Heaven, hoping to peacefully reduce Hell's overpopulation. Most of Hell mocks Charlie's goal, particularly after her first client, porn star Angel Dust, teams up with his friend Cherri Bomb in a turf war against demon inventor Sir Pentious. As Charlie and Vaggie bring Angel Dust back to the Happy Hotel, they are greeted by the feared "Radio Demon" Alastor, who wants to help the hotel so he can entertain himself seeing sinners fail at the end. Charlie allows Alastor to help, and he enlists his associates Niffty and Husk as the hotel's housekeeper and bartender, respectively, then renames the Happy Hotel to the Hazbin Hotel. Musical numbers: "I'm Always Chasing Rainbows", (Note: A cover of the 1917 song "I'm Always Chasing Rainbows") "Inside of Every Demon Is a Rainbow", and "Alastor's Reprise"

=== Season 1 (2024) ===
No. overall	No. in season	Title	Directed by	Written by	Original release date	Prod. code
1	1	"Overture"	Vivienne Medrano	Vivienne Medrano	January 19, 2024 (Note: The first two episodes of season one were released on January 12, 2024, to those who pre-ordered or purchased merchandise on the Hazbin Hotel website.)	1BBHH01
Charlie Morningstar's father, Lucifer, was an angel who fell in love with Lilith, the first woman, who left her controlling husband Adam. Lucifer and Lilith gave the second woman, Eve, the gift of free will, inadvertently creating Hell, where Lucifer and Lilith were banished by Heaven. To keep Hell's sinners in line, angels created the annual Extermination, an event where angels called Exorcists purge demons. One week after the events of the pilot, Hell is still recovering from the recent Extermination, and Charlie mentions to Vaggie that Lilith has been missing for seven years. Lucifer later calls Charlie and asks her to take his place in his annual meeting with Heaven. Charlie pitches to Adam—now leader of the Exterminations—and his second-in-command Lute, her plan to save sinners through redemption in her hotel. Her pitch is ridiculed and dismissed, and Adam reveals that the next Extermination will happen in six months rather than a year. Meanwhile, Vaggie enlists the hotel residents to make a commercial promoting the hotel, but its airing is cut short by a broadcast announcing that the Extermination date has been moved up. Lute discovers that for the first time, an Exorcist has been killed, and she and Adam plot to massacre every demon in Hell. Musical numbers: "Happy Day In Hell" and "Hell Is Forever"
2	2	"Radio Killed the Video Star"	Vivienne Medrano	Adam Neylan & Vivienne Medrano	January 19, 2024	1BBHH02
When a trio of powerful overlords known as the Vees (Vox, Valentino, and Velvette) find out that Alastor is back after being gone for seven years, Vox tries to send a warning to him. This backfires when Alastor sends his own warning to Vox. The Vees then decide to try to destroy the hotel from the inside. Vox enlists Sir Pentious to spy on the hotel by posing as a guest. As Sir Pentious is getting adjusted to the operations of the hotel, Angel Dust feels saddened that Charlie does not believe he can change. Angel Dust later finds out that Sir Pentious is working for Vox and shows Charlie and Vaggie proof. Although Angel Dust and Vaggie want to kill Sir Pentious, Charlie forgives him and gives him a second chance after witnessing Vox yell at him for failing. Sir Pentious apologizes for his deceit and decides to become a true patron at the hotel. Musical numbers: "Stayed Gone" and "It Starts With Sorry"
3	3	"Scrambled Eggs"	Vivienne Medrano	Ariel Ladensohn	January 19, 2024	1BBHH03
To help Sir Pentious improve as a person, Vaggie insists that he get rid of his egg minions. She asks Alastor to get rid of them, but before he can, he runs into ancient overlord Zestial, who invites him to a meeting for the overlords of Hell. During it, Velvette brings the head of the dead angel, suggesting that they go to war with Heaven, but this idea is shot down by Zestial, as it would result in even more deaths. Velvette insults Zestial but is kicked out by overlord Carmilla Carmine, who controls Hell's weapon supplies. Carmilla confides with Zestial that she killed the exorcist to protect her daughters, though this is overheard by one of the egg minions, who relays the message to Alastor. Meanwhile, Charlie asks Vaggie to lead trust exercises at the hotel. Vaggie worries that the group will not be ready when the next Extermination happens and pushes the patrons to participate in strenuous activities. However, when Charlie tells Vaggie that she feels that she is going too far with her methods, the two talk it out and discover their friends bonded over the experiences Vaggie put them through. Charlie and Vaggie let Sir Pentious keep the eggs. Musical numbers: "Respectless" and "Whatever It Takes"
4	4	"Masquerade"	Vivienne Medrano	Adam Neylan & Vivienne Medrano	January 19, 2024	1BBHH04
Angel Dust leaves the hotel to act in a porn film for his boss, Valentino. While shooting, Charlie arrives and tries to negotiate more time off for Angel Dust, but Valentino beats Angel Dust, reminds him that he owns Angel Dust's soul, and forces him to make her leave. Angel Dust continues filming and is constantly assaulted by Valentino and other workers. Returning to the hotel, he gets into an argument with Husk. Angel Dust leaves to go to a bar, followed by Husk at Charlie's insistence. Husk saves Angel Dust from being drugged by another sinner, but Angel Dust lashes out at him for saving him, exclaiming that he purposely lets other sinners mistreat him so that when he is broken and ruined, Valentino will stop using him. Husk reveals that he was once an overlord whose gambling addiction led him to make a deal with Alastor to keep his power, trapping him in a similar situation to Angel Dust. At the hotel, Angel Dust thanks Charlie for caring about him, making her emotional. Musical numbers: "Poison" and "Loser, Baby"
5	5	"Dad Beat Dad"	Vivienne Medrano	Rachel Kaplan	January 26, 2024	1BBHH05
Charlie spends all night trying to figure out a way to reconnect with Heaven. Left with no other options, she calls her father, Lucifer. He shows up at the hotel and is not impressed, clashing with Alastor. They are interrupted when Alastor's friend Mimzy unexpectedly arrives at the hotel, wanting to meet with Alastor. Husk is distrustful of Mimzy, claiming that she only shows up when she needs something. Alastor brushes him off, but when Husk reminds Alastor that he himself is in debt to someone, Alastor threatens to kill him if he mentions this again. Husk's suspicions about Mimzy are discovered to be true, as several loan shark demons attack the hotel in an attempt to find her. Alastor uses his powers to kill the loan sharks before forcing Mimzy to leave, not wanting the hotel to be damaged further. Lucifer states that he believes Charlie's plan is impossible because sinners are inherently evil and that Heaven will never listen to her. This upsets Charlie, but they ultimately reconcile, and Lucifer agrees to arrange Charlie another meeting with Heaven. Musical numbers: "Hell's Greatest Dad" and "More Than Anything"
6	6	"Welcome to Heaven"	Vivienne Medrano	Adam Stein	January 26, 2024	1BBHH06
Charlie and Vaggie arrive in Heaven for a trial to decide whether sinners can be redeemed, and are greeted by seraphim Sera and Emily. Adam and Lute confront Vaggie, a former exorcist. The trial begins as the court observes Angel Dust's actions when Cherri Bomb takes him and the other hotel residents to a nightclub. While protecting Niffty from Valentino, Angel Dust stands up to him. Charlie claims that this is proof of Angel Dust being redeemable, but the angels admit that they do not know how souls enter Heaven. Adam accidentally reveals the Exterminations to the court, leading to a rift between Sera and Emily, the former of whom had reluctantly allowed the exterminations, and the latter of whom stands with Charlie. Adam also reveals Vaggie's past to Charlie. The court finds that there is no evidence that a sinner can be redeemed. Adam sends Charlie and Vaggie back to Hell, promising that during the next Extermination in a month, he would come for the hotel first. Musical numbers: "Welcome To Heaven" and "You Didn't Know"
7	7	"Hello Rosie!"	Vivienne Medrano	Ariel Ladensohn	February 2, 2024	1BBHH07
After Charlie and Vaggie are sent back to Hell, the rest of the hotel discusses Vaggie's past as an exorcist. Alastor extracts the promise of a future favor from Charlie in exchange for informing her that there is a way to kill exorcists, and that Carmilla Carmine knows the secret to it. Vaggie visits Carmilla to convince her to help, while Charlie and Alastor seek other sinners to help them fight. Alastor takes Charlie to meet Rosie, the overlord who runs Cannibal Town. Rosie and eventually the rest of the cannibals agree to help fend off the angels. Rosie convinces Charlie that Vaggie is redeeming herself through the hotel. Meanwhile, Carmilla teaches Vaggie how to fight angels and informs her that she killed the exorcist using angelic weaponry scavenged from past Exterminations. Vaggie regains her wings, and Carmilla agrees to help by supplying the hotel with angelic weapons. Vaggie and Charlie reconcile with each other. Upon entering the hotel, they see the residents fortifying it for the battle with the angels. Musical numbers: "Out For Love" and "Ready For This"
8	8	"The Show Must Go On"	Vivienne Medrano	Adam Stein	February 2, 2024	1BBHH08
Extermination Day arrives, and a war between angels and sinners ensues. During the battle, Adam badly wounds Alastor, forcing him to flee. Sir Pentious confesses his love for Cherri Bomb before sacrificing himself in a failed attempt to destroy Adam. Distraught and enraged by Sir Pentious' death, Charlie enters her demon form and confronts Adam while Vaggie fights Lute. Lucifer arrives to help Charlie and overpowers Adam, who destroys the hotel before being killed by Niffty. Lute and the other angels retreat, and Charlie rebuilds the hotel to a greater state alongside her friends and father. As the Vees plot to take over Hell, Alastor hopes for freedom from his deal before reuniting with Charlie and her friends. Sir Pentious manifests in Heaven as an angel, proving that sinners can be redeemed. Lute confronts Lilith in Heaven, saying that if she wants to stay there, she must return to Hell and stop Charlie's hotel. Musical numbers: "More Than Anything (Reprise)" and "Finale"

=== Season 2 (2025) ===
No. overall	No. in season	Title	Directed by	Written by	Original release date	Prod. code
9	1	"New Pentious"	Vivienne Medrano	Adam Stein	October 29, 2025	HZBN201
About a month after the defeat of the Exorcists, the hotel is popular due to a misconceived belief that it is where sinners should gather to kill angels. Charlie has not moved on from Sir Pentious' death, and is hounded by the press. She is given a break by Lucifer, who motivates her to tell the truth about the hotel to the public, losing almost everyone's interest. One of the few sinners who stays is Baxter, a mad scientist who wishes to study redemption and is frequently compared to Sir Pentious by Charlie and Niffty. Charlie finds out from Emily that Sir Pentious was successfully redeemed. Meanwhile, Vox plans to spin Charlie's plan for the hotel into a devious scheme for him and the other Vees to take over Heaven as gods. Musical numbers: "Hazbin Guarantee (Trust Us)" and "Once We Get Up There"
10	2	"Storyteller"	Vivienne Medrano	Vivienne Medrano	October 29, 2025	HZBN202
Sir Pentious is chained up and is questioned by Heaven. He is asked by the Speaker of God to tell his story. In his life, he was an inventor in London in 1888 who allowed a killer to get away, which sent him to Hell. However, due to his selfless act of sacrifice in the Extermination battle, he was redeemed, much to Lute's anger. Her pleas to expel Sir Pentious are turned down by Abel, Adam's son and the new head of Heaven's army. While Emily, Saint Peter, and Abel welcome Sir Pentious, he admits that he wants to see his friends from Hell again, but finds out he cannot leave Heaven. Sera confesses to the Speaker of God about her misdeed of allowing the Exterminations, and she barricades Heaven for its safety. Lute, goaded by a hallucination of Adam, plans to exact revenge on Hell. Meanwhile, Lilith continues to avoid Charlie's calls. Musical numbers: "Like You", "Sera's Confession", and "Gravity"
11	3	"Hazbin Hotel: Behind Closed Doors"	Vivienne Medrano	Skye Henwood	November 5, 2025	HZBN203
Charlie tells her friends that Sir Pentious is in Heaven. She invites Vox and Velvette to the hotel for an interview, hoping she can convince them to stop spreading misinformation about the hotel. Lacking evidence of Sir Pentious' redemption, she attempts to repeat the process with Angel Dust, but it backfires and results in Vox exposing that Angel Dust is in Hell for patricide. He then edits the footage of the hotel to further damage Charlie's reputation. Meanwhile, Cherri Bomb discusses Sir Pentious with Baxter, who tells her that he and Sir Pentious were once lab partners until the latter decided to focus on turf wars with Cherri Bomb. Cherri Bomb and Sir Pentious separately lament about how they miss their constant battles. Later, Cherri decides to stay at the hotel. Musical numbers: "Piss (A Love Song)" and "Speedrun To Redemption"
12	4	"It's a Deal"	Vivienne Medrano	Skye Henwood & Vivienne Medrano	November 5, 2025	HZBN204
Alastor quits the hotel after being taunted by Lucifer, who tells him he has not contributed to the Hotel. He then meets with Rosie in Cannibal Town; in Alastor's life, he was a radio host and serial killer in New Orleans in the 1930s, and the day before his death, he sold his soul to Rosie to become the strongest sinner in Hell. Charlie tries to mend her reputation by having herself and Niffty interviewed by VoxTek news anchor Katie Killjoy, which goes poorly. Alastor later battles the Vees. When the Vees gain the upper hand, Alastor strikes a deal with Vox, acting as his prisoner in exchange for Vox not laying his hands on Charlie. The imprisoned Alastor taunts Vox for relying on others; in the past, Vox tried to form a partnership with Alastor, who turned him down. Musical numbers: "Don't You Forget", "Clean It Up!", and "Don't You Forget (Reprise)"
13	5	"Silenced"	Vivienne Medrano	Vivienne Medrano	November 12, 2025	HZBN205
After learning that Vox has captured Alastor, most of the other overlords join Vox's side. Vaggie tells Lucifer about what Vox is doing, and Lucifer tries to stop Vox as he holds a rally, which backfires as Lucifer cannot hurt sinners. Charlie gets Emily's attention, and she visits Hell with Sera, Abel, and Lute to apologize for the Exterminations. The angels arrive at Vox's rally, but he twists the narrative of Lucifer's and the angels' interventions. When Sera admits that she started the Exterminations because of sinners like Vox, he uses her remark as a declaration of war. Charlie becomes enraged at her father, asking him to leave, and has an argument with Vaggie after the latter calls her out for not listening. Meanwhile, a still-imprisoned Alastor begins to put a wrench in Vox's relationship with Valentino. Musical numbers: "Bad With Us", "Vox Populi", and "Vox Dei"
14	6	"Scream Rain"	Vivienne Medrano	Christina Friel & Connor Wright	November 12, 2025	HZBN206
Vox talks with Carmilla, who reluctantly agrees to build a weapon for his war with Heaven, as his relationships with Velvette and Valentino strain, much to the duo's frustration. As Charlie and Vaggie continue to argue, Husk, annoyed by the argumentative couple and with Alastor gone, quits. Charlie and Vaggie later try to talk to Carmilla, who blames them for starting the war. Meanwhile, Husk heads to a casino, where he encounters Angel Dust in drag, and they apologize to each other. Husk returns to being the bartender of the hotel, while both Charlie and Vaggie reconcile back at the hotel, with Charlie tearfully admitting her fears of pushing people away. Angel Dust meets with Valentino and Vox at a motel, and the latter reveals that he has been controlling Angel Dust through hypnosis to serve as a spy. Using Charlie's voice, Vox calls Lucifer to meet at a discreet location. Musical numbers: "Love In A Bottle", "Losin' Streak", and "Easy"
15	7	"Weapon of Mass Distraction"	Vivienne Medrano	Adam Neylan	November 19, 2025	HZBN207
In Vox's life, he was a weather reporter who murdered his competition and superiors to form a cult, before dying when a television fell on his head. Vox captures Lucifer to use as the power source for the cannon Carmilla built. Using a hypnotized Angel Dust, he broadcasts a message to Heaven, giving Sera 24 hours to surrender to Hell or face war. The cannon fires into Heaven, destroying its barrier and gates. Vox invites Charlie to his celebration, which she agrees to join on the slim chance she can do something. After a talk with Sir Pentious, Sera allows Emily to try to solve things peacefully while preparing Lute and Abel to rescue her in case things go wrong. At the hotel, Charlie, Emily, and the hotel residents plan to have Baxter and Sir Pentious hack Vox's broadcasting services to show Sir Pentious' presence in Heaven. Musical numbers: "Brighter", "Live To Live", and "When I Think About The Future"
16	8	"Curtain Call"	Vivienne Medrano	Adam Neylan & Adam Stein	November 19, 2025	HZBN208
Charlie and Emily pledge for peace at the celebration, Niffty guards Baxter as he hacks the broadcast, Husk and Cherri Bomb rescue Angel Dust, and Vaggie tries to destroy the cannon. Alastor breaks free from both his deals by using his favor to force Charlie to say that Vox is the strongest sinner in Hell, which prompts Vox to thank her by touching her shoulders. Vox uses the cannon while battling Alastor, destroying large portions of the city and his own reputation, and costing Emily a wing. The hotel residents defeat Valentino and Velvette, who have had enough of Vox and decapitate him but leave him alive. Emily, Charlie and her friends, and all of the Overlords destroy the overloading cannon, saving the city and Lucifer. Lute arrives and fights Vaggie, but is stopped by Abel. Sir Pentious broadcasts his redemption to all of Hell, while a guilty Angel Dust leaves the hotel and returns to Valentino, who now leads the Vees. To Lute's frustration, Heaven officially ends the Exterminations and plans to welcome redeemed sinners. The hotel thrives again, with Vaggie, who has renamed herself Vaggi, as its manager, and Lilith finally calls Charlie back. Musical number: "Hear My Hope"

== Production ==
Creator Vivienne Medrano began funding her work on Hazbin Hotel via Patreon in 2014. Some characters from the pilot had existed for years when Vivienne Medrano began working with people at School of Visual Arts (SVA) on what would later become Hazbin Hotel, such as the "Misfit Demon Gang" in Medrano's webcomic series ZooPhobia. Originally, the pilot was meant to be an adult comedy "with a raunchy, demonic aesthetic". It was made by freelance animators and financed by Medrano's Patreon followers. It took over six months to write the episode, and over two years to animate it, with teasers released in that ensuing period to garner an audience of fans. The series contains various LGBTQ+ characters. This includes gay Angel Dust, bisexual Charlie, and asexual Alastor.

The show's pilot episode was released on Medrano's YouTube channel in October 2019, and it gained 54 million views by early February 2021. In August 2020, A24 picked up Hazbin Hotel for the production of a TV series.

The overall transition towards a television format was difficult for the production crew, as they had to work within an allotted number of episodes and runtime in order to tell the overall story for the first season. The episode count was limited to eight 22-minute-long episodes for financial reasons due to A24 picking up the show without a distributor. This led them to struggle with including the plot elements that were in Medrano's vision for the season without going over any of their set limitations, which affected the overall narrative and pacing of the season as a result. They were also unsure if the show would be renewed for more seasons during its production, although they still remained committed to telling the best story they could.

On December 21, 2021, the official Hazbin Hotel Twitter account teased the release of the first season. It was later reported that the cast members from the pilot were not asked to reprise their roles for the A24 production, though these voice actors showed support for the show despite their removal. Medrano said that she loves her characters "more than anything" and that they are "in good hands".

Several main characters had been redesigned from the pilot, including Charlie, Vaggie, Alastor, and Angel Dust. Along with SpindleHorse Toons, Bento Box Entertainment co-produced the series for A24. Animation services were handled by Bento Box's subsidiary, Princess Bento Studio, a Melbourne-based studio jointly owned with Princess Pictures, alongside SpindleHorse Toons and Toon City. (Note: Public profile LinkedIn) According to Medrano, many of the artists who worked on the pilot would be returning for the first season, and argued that the "indie spirit of the pilot lives on". Medrano has also confirmed that the pilot remains canon to the story.

On October 28, 2022, on the third anniversary of the pilot's release, a teaser trailer was released and uploaded on Medrano's YouTube channel promising a summer 2023 release date for the first season and featuring Alastor speaking on a microphone; however, this was later stalled due to the 2023 SAG-AFTRA strike blocking promotion of the series by the cast.

On September 28, 2023, a teaser was posted on the series' official Instagram account and on Medrano's YouTube channel announcing that "Season 2 is coming". On July 26, 2024, the series was confirmed to be renewed for a third and fourth season. On August 13, 2024, DogHead Animation in Florence, Italy, were announced to be will also be handling animation services for the second season. (Note: DogHead Animation. "📣 WE ARE HIRING! 📣 We are looking for 2D Layout Posing Artists and 2D… | 90 comments". LinkedIn.)

In September 2025, Medrano acknowledged that the first season had issues with its narrative and runtime, as the process of telling the first season's story within the show's set limitations was described by her as "borderline-impossible" during its production, although she still remained proud of its final look. She stated that the second season would have improved pacing and narrative. Its story was described as being simpler than the first season, with all of the episodes being longer than 22 minutes. Medrano also stated there is a five-season plan for the show. On April 25, 2026, it was announced that the series was renewed for a fifth and final season.

== Release ==
On December 13, 2023, the first trailer was released. The series premiered on January 19, 2024, with the first episode also releasing on YouTube a day earlier for a limited time.

On July 24, 2025, the trailer for the second season was released. The second season premiered on October 29, 2025.

== Soundtrack ==
The score of the pilot episode was released on November 3, 2019.

The day after the release of each episode of the first season, the songs featured within them were released on a soundtrack EP through A24 Music, starting with Part 1 on January 19, 2024. Two songs from the first two episodes were released ahead of the series and are not present on any of the EPs; "Happy Day in Hell" was released on October 20, 2023, following a preview at New York Comic Con and "Poison" was released on January 5, 2024. Following the release of the series, "Poison" debuted at number 34 on the U.S. Billboard Hot Rock & Alternative Songs chart, having accumulated 2.7 million American streams in the week following the show.

The soundtrack for the second season was announced in October 2025 and was released on November 19, 2025. It was preceded by the singles "Hazbin Guarantee (Trust Us)" and "Gravity".

=== Soundtrack albums ===
List of soundtrack albums, with selected chart positions
Title	Album details	Peak chart positions					
Title	Album details	US	CAN	JPN Dig.	NOR	NZ	UK DL
Hazbin Hotel (Original Film Score)	Released: November 3, 2019; Label: Goosetunes; Formats: Digital download, streaming	—	—	—	—	—	—
Hazbin Hotel (Original Soundtrack)	Released: February 2, 2024; Label: A24 Music; Formats: Digital download, streaming, vinyl	13	14	6	17	6	9
Hazbin Hotel: Season Two (Original Soundtrack)	Released: November 19, 2025; Label: Atlantic Records; Format: Digital download, streaming, vinyl, CD, cassette	8	7	6	—	11	3

=== EPs ===
List of soundtrack EPs, with selected chart positions
Title	Album details	Peak chart positions				
Title	Album details	US	CAN	JPN Dig.	NOR	UK DL
Hazbin Hotel Original Soundtrack (Part 1)	Released: January 19, 2024; Label: A24 Music; Formats: Digital download, streaming	95	84	15	—	11
Hazbin Hotel Original Soundtrack (Part 2)	Released: January 26, 2024; Label: A24 Music; Formats: Digital download, streaming	189	—	12	—	—
Hazbin Hotel Original Soundtrack (Part 3)	Released: February 1, 2024; Label: A24 Music; Formats: Digital download, streaming	—	—	13	—	—
Hazbin Hotel: Season Two (Episodes 1–2) [Original Soundtrack]	Released: October 29, 2025; Label: Atlantic Records; Format: Streaming	—	—	—	—	—
Hazbin Hotel: Season Two (Episodes 3–4) [Original Soundtrack]	Released: November 5, 2025; Label: Atlantic Records; Format: Streaming	—	—	—	—	—
Hazbin Hotel: Season Two (Episodes 5–6) [Original Soundtrack]	Released: November 12, 2025; Label: Atlantic Records; Format: Streaming	—	—	—	20	—

=== Singles ===
List of singles, with selected chart positions, showing year released and album name
Title	Year	Peak chart positions						Album
Title	Year	US Bub.	US Rock /Alt.	CAN	IRE	NZ Hot	UK	Album
"Happy Day in Hell"	2023	—	—	—	—	—	—	Hazbin Hotel (Original Soundtrack)
"Poison"	2024	2	14	69	—	24	96	Hazbin Hotel (Original Soundtrack)
"Hazbin Guarantee (Trust Us)"	2025	—	—	—	—	—	—	Hazbin Hotel: Season Two (Original Soundtrack)
"Gravity"	2025	4	11	80	82	4	53	Hazbin Hotel: Season Two (Original Soundtrack)
"White Christmas" (cover)	2025	—	—	—	—	—	—	Hazbin Hotel Presents: A Very Egg Boi Christmas
"Baby It's Cold Outside" (cover)	2025	—	—	—	—	—	—	Hazbin Hotel Presents: A Very Egg Boi Christmas
"—" denotes a recording that did not chart or was not released in that territory.

=== Other charted songs ===
List of other charted songs, with selected chart positions, showing year released and album name
Title	Year	Peak chart positions							Album
Title	Year	US Hot	US Bub.	US Rock /Alt.	CAN	IRE	NZ Hot	UK	Album
"Stayed Gone"	2024	—	11	—	85	—	21	— (Note: "Stayed Gone" did not enter the UK Singles Chart, but peaked at number 29 on the UK Independent Singles Chart and at number 13 on the UK Independent Singles Breakers Chart.)	Hazbin Hotel Original Soundtrack (Part 1)
"Respectless"	2024	—	—	27	—	—	28	—	Hazbin Hotel Original Soundtrack (Part 1)
"Loser, Baby"	2024	—	1	—	65	—	10	77	Hazbin Hotel Original Soundtrack (Part 1)
"Hell's Greatest Dad"	2024	—	9	—	74	—	23	98	Hazbin Hotel Original Soundtrack (Part 2)
"More Than Anything"	2024	—	—	31	—	—	38	—	Hazbin Hotel Original Soundtrack (Part 2)
"You Didn't Know"	2024	—	25	—	—	—	24	— (Note: "You Didn't Know" did not enter the UK Singles Chart, but peaked at number 17 on the UK Independent Singles Breakers Chart.)	Hazbin Hotel Original Soundtrack (Part 2)
"Out for Love"	2024	—	20	—	94	—	—	—	Hazbin Hotel Original Soundtrack (Part 3)
"Once We Get Up There"	2025	—	—	—	—	—	29	—	Hazbin Hotel: Season 2 (Original Soundtrack)
"Sera's Confession"	2025	—	—	—	—	—	18	—	Hazbin Hotel: Season 2 (Original Soundtrack)
"Piss (A Love Song)"	2025	—	—	45	—	—	—	—	Hazbin Hotel: Season 2 (Original Soundtrack)
"Don't You Forget"	2025	—	—	—	—	—	23	—	Hazbin Hotel: Season 2 (Original Soundtrack)
"Clean It Up!"	2025	—	—	42	—	—	—	—	Hazbin Hotel: Season 2 (Original Soundtrack)
"Don't You Forget (Reprise)"	2025	—	—	—	—	—	16	87	Hazbin Hotel: Season 2 (Original Soundtrack)
"Vox Populi"	2025	—	—	17	—	—	20	72	Hazbin Hotel: Season 2 (Original Soundtrack)
"Love in a Bottle"	2025	—	1	—	74	53	3	29	Hazbin Hotel: Season 2 (Original Soundtrack)
"Losin' Streak"	2025	98	—	—	79	92	2	41	Hazbin Hotel: Season 2 (Original Soundtrack)
"Easy"	2025	—	—	—	—	—	13	—	Hazbin Hotel: Season 2 (Original Soundtrack)
"Brighter"	2025	—	11	12	—	—	13	47	Hazbin Hotel: Season 2 (Original Soundtrack)
"When I Think About the Future"	2025	—	—	—	—	—	37	—	Hazbin Hotel: Season 2 (Original Soundtrack)
"Hear My Hope"	2025	—	—	—	—	—	20	—	Hazbin Hotel: Season 2 (Original Soundtrack)
"—" denotes a recording that did not chart or was not released in that territory.

== Reception ==
=== Critical reception ===
==== Pilot ====
The pilot episode was critically acclaimed for its animation quality, music, and characters. Matthew Field of Go! & Express, argued that the pilot was part of the "animation renaissance" on YouTube, and said there may be "a lot more projects like Hazbin in the future". Lidia Vassar of the MSU Reporter praised the show, noting its "raunchy sense of humor and quirky art style". She also stated that she was looking forward to future episodes, enjoyed the "diversity of character designs", and stated that it is clear that the show's creators "put a lot of time and heart into this project". In December 2019, in an article about the current state of adult animation, CBR animation critic Reuben Baron stated that while the pilot episodes of Hazbin Hotel and Helluva Boss had garnered "some warranted criticism" because of their inappropriate and edgy humor, they are still "clear labors of love from an animation standpoint". Another critic on CBR, Nerissa Rupnarine, pointed out that Alastor is on the small list of "canon asexual characters" within animation.

Some reviewers argued the series will have a positive influence on independent animation going forward, and argued that the success of Hazbin Hotel led to the success of Helluva Boss. Reviewer Sean Cubillas for CBR praised the show for "quirky, ambitious, and dark humor" and some of the "fastest, wittiest, and raunchiest dialogue ever seen in independent animation".

==== Season 1 ====
On the review aggregator website Rotten Tomatoes, 81% of 32 critics' reviews are positive, with an average rating of 7.9/10. The website's consensus reads: "A hellzapoppin' musical series swathed in hot, vibrant colors, Hazbin Hotel is worth a booking." Metacritic, which uses a weighted average, assigned a score of 69 out of 100 based on 8 critics, indicating "generally favorable reviews".

Erik Piepenburg of the Los Angeles Times (LA Times) said the show's universe is a "brazenly colorful, queer-inclusive and fast-paced mishmash" with "outlandish grotesque scenes and copious potty mouths", along with "a Broadway pop score". Christine N. Ziemba of Paste argued that the series is not "simply a rehash" of the pilot, is not for kids, and includes "wickedly pointed adult humor", characters which are eccentric or are sinners, and "Disney-esque musical numbers", and called the series "visually eye-catching". Hope Mullinax of Collider said series expectations were "easily smashed", praising the music, cast, and design choices. She was excited to see where the series went forward, but was disappointed that Cherri Bomb did not get a bigger role. Joe Draper of Digital Spy described the series as explicit and including an "all-star cast of stage performers and TV favourites". Petrana Radulovic of Polygon described the series as a "character-driven musical with an overarching driving plot and a lot of deep world-building", also noting that it features "multiple female and queer leads".

Rendy Jones of Rogerebert.com said that some jokes are not as effective, and that the "ambitious wings" of Medrano were trimmed "by corporate streaming demands". He claimed the series has hit-or-miss gory humor and disorienting camera angles, but overall has stellar music, skillful voice actors, and a "balanced charm to round out its hellish setting", and called it a "sweet, raunchy time" that many adults will like. Rachel Leishman of The Mary Sue called the series special for its musical element and argued that animated series have a "special kind of magic to them", and stated that Hazbin Hotel's shine is its own, and is a "fun series to take a dive into". Mae Abdulbaki of Screen Rant called the series "lively", praised the cast, characters, catchy songs, and "chaotic energy", while saying the themes of good and evil could be "more nuanced" and that the characters can act "extremely childish" at times.

In contrast, Alison Herman of Variety said that although the series has a "feel-good backstory belied by its grim premise" and original idea that's "easy to root for", it pays less attention to cosmological details or motivations of the protagonists. She said the series has retrograde morality, gets lost in "its chaotic, contradictory atmosphere", and is not far along enough to "function as a full season of TV", comparing it unfavorably to The Good Place. In addition, Jenna Scherer of The A.V. Club said the series has a "lot going for it", praising the premise, stylish and innovative animation, music numbers, and voice actors, but criticized the writing as lacking, and hoped the second season allowed the series to "slow down and find its groove", but noted that the series will "find its audience regardless".

Kristy Puchko of Mashable described the series as a "perky pink cartoon show about sinners and singing", but argued that the first three episodes are "unremarkable" to newcomers, and said that the dialogue is jarring when compared with an animation style which "seems to be aping Disney XD", as well as saying it is "not satisfyingly subversive". She hoped that the series will "overcome its growing pains" in the first season, and says this expansion of Medrano's works is "flashy but thin". The New Hampshire Union-Leader criticized the series as having an "utterly confusing backstory/mythology", frantic action, overall calling it a "headache of a show", as well as stating the dialogue sounds "more adolescent than shocking".

Following its release, Hazbin Hotel set a new streaming record for Prime Video, becoming the largest global debut in viewership for a new animated title on the platform. In February 2024, the pilot episode surpassed 100 million views on YouTube.

==== Season 2 ====
On the review aggregator website Rotten Tomatoes, 90% of 10 critics' reviews are positive, with an average rating of 8.2/10. Metacritic, which uses a weighted average, assigned a score of 80 out of 100 based on four critics, indicating "generally favorable reviews". Upon the debut of season 2, Hazbin Hotel briefly became the number one television show worldwide on Prime Video, as well as number one in 23 countries, and in the top 10 in 50 countries.

=== Awards and nominations ===
Award	Date of ceremony	Category	Recipient(s)	Result	Ref.
Astra TV Awards	December 8, 2024	Best Animated Series	Hazbin Hotel	Nominated	
Billboard Music Awards	December 12, 2024	Top Soundtrack	Hazbin Hotel: Season One	Nominated	
Annie Awards	February 8, 2025	Outstanding Achievement for Music in an Animated Television/Broadcast Production	"Masquerade" – Sam Haft, Andrew Underberg	Nominated	
Annie Awards	February 8, 2025	Outstanding Achievement for Voice Acting in an Animated Television/Broadcast Production	"Dad Beat Dad" – Jeremy Jordan as Lucifer Morningstar	Nominated	
GLAAD Media Awards	March 27, 2025	Outstanding New Series	Hazbin Hotel	Nominated	
American Music Awards	May 26, 2025	Favorite Soundtrack	Hazbin Hotel (Original Soundtrack)	Nominated	
Annie Awards	February 21, 2026	Outstanding Achievement for Voice Acting in an Animated Television/Broadcast Production	"Hazbin Hotel: Behind Closed Doors" – Erika Henningsen as Charlie Morningstar	Nominated	
GLAAD Media Awards	March 5, 2026	Outstanding Comedy Series	Hazbin Hotel	Nominated	
American Music Awards	May 25, 2026	Best Soundtrack	Hazbin Hotel: Season Two	Nominated	
Astra TV Awards	August 15, 2026	Best Animated Series	Hazbin Hotel	Won	
Astra TV Awards	August 15, 2026	Best Supporting Voice-Over Performance	Alex Brightman – Hazbin Hotel	Nominated	
Astra TV Awards	August 15, 2026	Best Supporting Voice-Over Performance	Stephanie Beatriz – Hazbin Hotel	Won	
Imagen Awards	August 21, 2026	Best Voice-Over Actor	Stephanie Beatriz – Hazbin Hotel	Nominated	
Imagen Awards	August 21, 2026	Best Voice-Over Actor	Leslie Rodriguez Kritzer, Hazbin Hotel	Nominated	
Imagen Awards	August 21, 2026	Best Voice-Over Actor	Daphne Rubin-Vega, Hazbin Hotel	Won	

== Other official media ==
=== Webcomics ===
From October 27, 2019, to July 7, 2020, a webcomic titled "Chapter 1: Dirty Healings" (which showed how Angel Dust learned of the hotel) was completed, containing twenty-two pages and hosted on the official Hazbin Hotel website. Another comic entitled "The Radio Demon", also known as "A Day in the Afterlife", which focused on Alastor's daily life in Hell, was posted to the website on October 19, 2020, containing sixteen pages.

=== Music ===
==== "Addict" song and music video ====
"Addict" is an animated music video released on July 17, 2020, on Medrano's YouTube channel, based on and featuring the Silva Hound song of the same name. It centers around Angel Dust's relations with his best friend, Cherri Bomb, and his abusive boss, Valentino, and Angel and Cherri's experiences with addiction. The song was performed by Michael Kovach and Kelly "Chi-Chi" Boyer. Tito W. James of Comicon.com described the video as giving viewers a "deeper look" at the lives of Cherri Bomb and Angel Dust, and praised the "world of Hazbin" for being "paradoxically provocative and empathetic". The song ranked as the #3 dance song on iTunes on July 21, 2020. Additionally, the song #14 on the US Dance/Electronic Songs chart, #4 on the Dance/Electronic Digital Songs chart, and #77 on the Hot Dance/Electronic Songs Year-End.

==== Concerts ====
A one-night-only concert, entitled Hazbin Hotel: Live on Broadway, occurred on October 20, 2025, at the Majestic Theatre on Broadway. It was hosted by Charlie's voice actor, Erika Henningsen, and featured the show's cast performing songs from seasons one and two of the show. It was produced by RadicalMedia, and a recording of the concert was made available for viewing on Prime Video on November 17, 2025.

=== Video games ===
On October 1, 2026, a trailer for the "Fortnitemares" event revealed that Charlie, Alastor, and Vaggie skins would soon be available in Fortnite.

=== Home media ===
The complete first season received a Blu-ray release that featured cast commentary on the episodes, as well as a trading card and a poster bundled with the purchase. It was released on December 9, 2025.

The complete second season received a Blu-ray release that featured cast commentary on the episodes, as well as a trading card and a poster bundled with the purchase. It was released on September 29, 2026.

=== Helluva Boss ===
A spin-off series, Helluva Boss, unveiled its first season on October 31, 2020, almost one year after the release of its own pilot. Helluva Boss takes place in the same fictional universe as Hazbin Hotel, the Hellaverse, but it has a different cast of characters and story. As Medrano described it, while both shows share the same setting, Hazbin Hotel is about redemption and consequences of past actions, while Helluva Boss follows "characters and societies that already exist in Hell", focusing on relationships between characters.

== Fandom ==
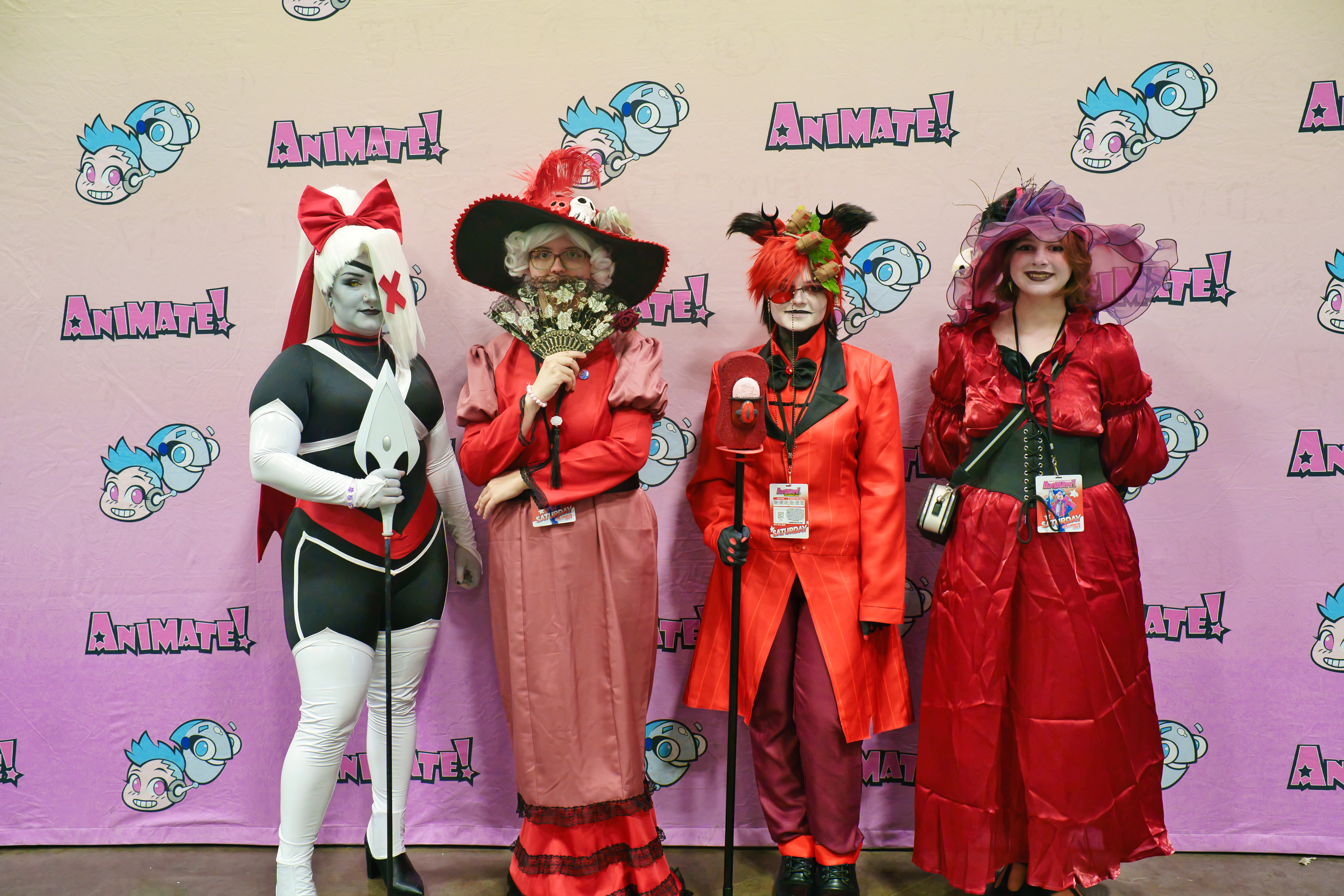
Attendees of Animate Columbus 2024 in cosplay of Hazbin Hotel characters

By August 2020, the show had developed a dedicated fanbase, with the 31-minute pilot receiving over 123 million views as of May 2026, a rise from 32 million views in May 2020. In a white paper about the increase in adult animation, John Evershed, founder of Mondo Media, described the series as a rare exception to shows on YouTube that are picked up by companies as a "long form TV series". He argued that the show generated enough attention and views to interest A24 in producing the show as a TV series. Medrano told Insider in February 2021 that she was surprised the show had gotten so big, saying that the fandom of Hazbin Hotel rivals those of shows with multiple seasons, even with only a pilot released, and that it "hit a chord with people" due to its art style, angst, and drama. Furthermore, she expressed excitement in the direction of the show, noting the demand for her content. Others called the series a "YouTube hit".

Some media outlets noted intense fan interest in the character Lucifer Morningstar, the king of Hell, who had not "physically appeared in any Hazbin Hotel work" prior to the show's first season. Sarah Laudenbach of Screen Rant noted that the series had developed a strong fanbase despite having "minimal content" available, with "longtime fans" praising the series for dealing with "dark topics like abuse and addiction". She also said that Medrano created an "entire Hellish universe" which gained a "fandom of its own". Kimberly Terasaki of The Mary Sue described the show as having inspired the "imaginations of thousands of fans" and noted that there are over 7,000 fan fictions for the series on Archive of Our Own, along with "thousands of fan comics and fandubs". Scholar Ben Mitchell described the series as "sensationally popular" and an effective use of Patreon to subsidize the show's art "through monthly tiered payments". In January 2025, Hazbin Hotel set the Guinness World Record for "Most in-demand animated TV show" for the period 1 February 2024 to 31 January 2025, with a global demand rating that was 74 times higher than the average show, surpassing the previous year's record of 71.2, which was held by Jujutsu Kaisen (JJK).

=== Unofficial media ===
On January 19, 2024, Gabriel C. Brown, Alastor's pilot singing voice, released "Thank You and Goodnight", a 'farewell song' sung by the pilot cast of Hazbin Hotel, marking their recast after a full season was greenlit for Amazon Prime Video.

In February 2024, an emote entitled "Reaper's Showtime" was released to the video game Fortnite by Epic Games, allowing the player character to wield a red and white scythe while playing the fan-created song "Insane".

== See also ==
- Modern animation in the United States
- Adult animation by country
- List of adult animated television series
  - List of adult animated television series of the 2010s
  - List of adult animated television series of the 2020s
- LGBTQ themes in Western animation
- List of animated series with LGBTQ characters: 2020–2024

== Bibliography ==
- Evershed, John (2021). The "Great Adult Animation Boom" is in Full Swing (PDF) (Report). High Concentrate, LLC in Squarespace. Archived from the original (PDF) on April 28, 2021.
