= Charlie Morningstar =

Fictional protagonist from Hazbin Hotel

- Hazbin Hotel character
- Charlie's official design
- First appearance: "That's Entertainment" (2019) (pilot debut) "Overture" (2024) (series debut)
- Created by: Vivienne Medrano
- Voiced by: Jill Harris (2019); Elsie Lovelock (2019, singing); Erika Henningsen (2024–present)

In-universe information
- Full name: Charlotte Morningstar
- Species: Hellborn
- Title: Princess of Hell
- Occupation: Founder of the Hazbin Hotel
- Weapon: Shield; Trident
- Family: Lucifer Morningstar (father); Lilith (mother)
- Significant other: Vaggie (girlfriend)
- Origin: Hell

Princess Charlotte "Charlie" Morningstar is a fictional character created by Vivienne "VivziePop" Medrano who appears as the protagonist of the American adult animated musical series Hazbin Hotel as the princess of Hell. She is primarily voiced by Erika Henningsen. Charlie runs the titular Hazbin Hotel, where she hopes to redeem the souls of those in Hell and help them earn a place in Heaven. She is the daughter of Lilith and Lucifer Morningstar and is also dating Vaggie (a fallen exorcist angel and the manager of the hotel). The character has received a universally positive critical reception.

== Development ==
=== Origins and concept ===
Charlie was created by Medrano during her time at the School of Visual Arts in New York City. Although the original steampunk-inspired design of the character has been described as an "entirely distinct entity", Medrano liked the name Charlie and transferred it to a new character, intended for her webcomic series ZooPhobia. Her original plotline intended for her to be a mortal soul who died in the 1830s, who became the "den mother" of the "Misfit Demon Gang" in ZooPhobia; the members of this gang would later become the main cast of Hazbin Hotel.

=== Design and characterization ===
In the Hazbin Hotel pilot, Charlie's surname was "Magne", as a pun on the name "Charlemagne". She looked much closer in appearance to her current design, wearing a red suitcoat. She was confirmed to be bisexual by Medrano on her Twitter account.

Before season 1, Charlie's last name was changed to Morningstar. This came from the concept of the devil's family name being "Morningstar" (the Latin translation of "Lucifer"), which was popularized by Neil Gaiman in a comic in 1989. After the release of the series' first episode in January 2024, Medrano was asked about changes in Charlie's design, and replied that she did not "actively change" the outfit, but drew her differently because of a change in her style. In an interview following the series release, Medrano said that she related to Charlie, and called her "plucky...determined and energetic", saying Charlie was a "very aspirational character" to her. On Charlie's character arc in the first season, her voice actress Erika Henningsen said:

“Life is lived in the gray. That's the journey that Charlie comes to over the season. She's always for forgiveness, but I do think she sometimes sees the world in black and white and the real world is not that. So the thing that we do in earnest because it's the right thing sometimes comes at other people's expense. What if what she thinks is right is potentially not? What if there is no right or wrong? What if there is just listening to people and maintaining a sense of integrity?”

=== Voices ===
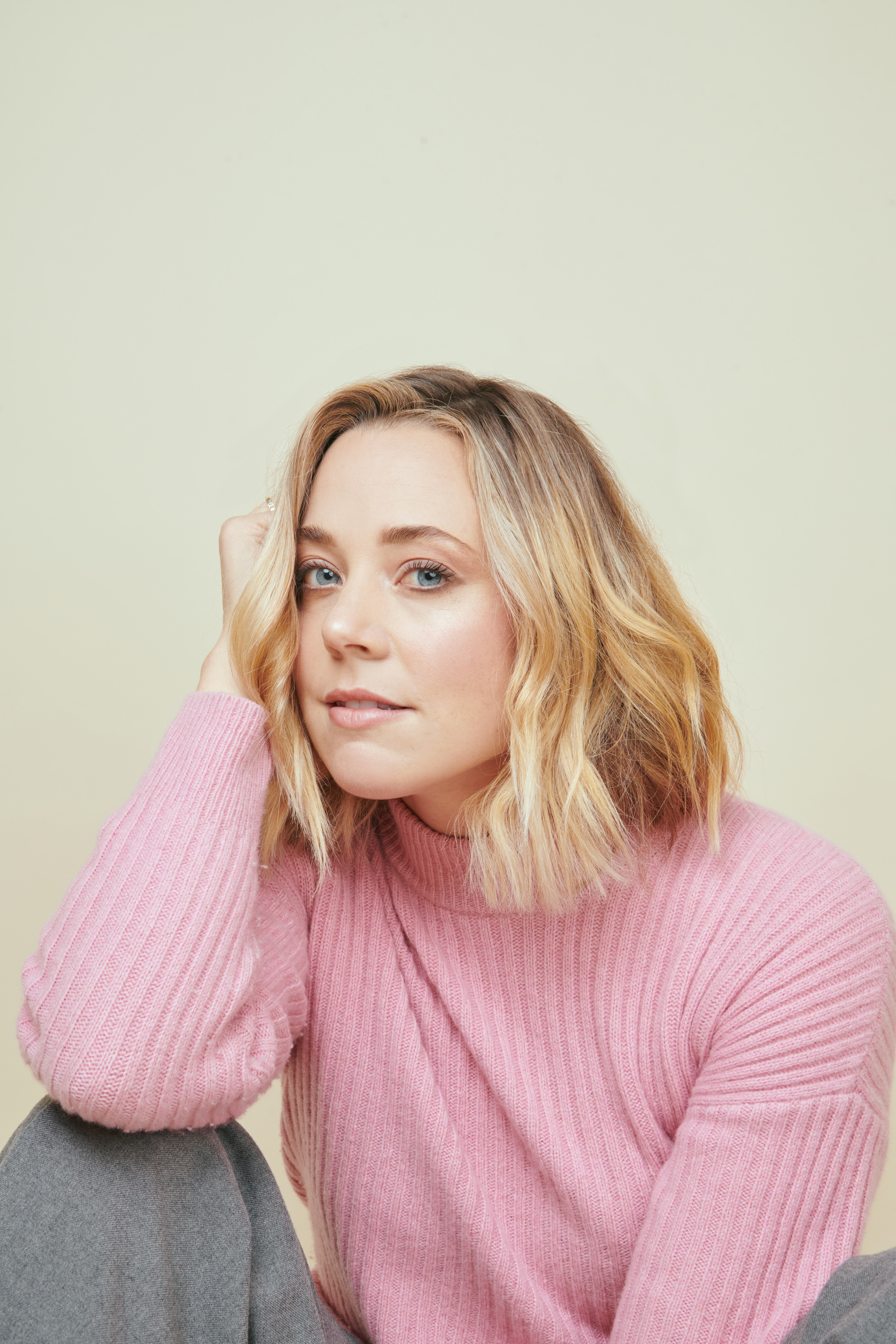
Erika Henningsen voices Charlie.

In the 2019 pilot of Hazbin Hotel, Jill Harris was cast as the speaking voice of Charlie, and Elsie Lovelock was cast as her singing voice. In the 2024 series, Charlie is voiced by Erika Henningsen.

== Fictional character biography ==
=== Hazbin Hotel ===
==== "That's Entertainment" (2019) ====
Charlie made her first full appearance in the Hazbin Hotel pilot episode, "That's Entertainment", released on October 28, 2019. The events of the episode take place after the events of "Dirty Healings". She is bubbly and upbeat and announces her "Happy Hotel", intended to redeem sinners to allow them to go to Heaven in a televised interview with newscaster Katie Killjoy. The interview ends in a fight between her and Katie, but this attracts the attention of Alastor "the Radio Demon", who visits her in the aftermath and offers his help in running the hotel.

==== "Dirty Healings" (2019–2020) ====
Charlie returned in a supporting role in "Dirty Healings", an official prequel webcomic published from October 27, 2019 to July 7, 2020. (Note: While "Dirty Healings" began publication one day before the release of "That's Entertainment", Charlie does not appear until pages released after the pilot.) The webcomic explores how Charlie and Vaggie recruited Angel Dust as the first patron of their hotel.

==== Season 1 (2024) ====
Charlie (left) and Vaggie (right) in "Overture".

In the 2024 Hazbin Hotel animated series, Charlie continues to further her dream of a redemption hotel. In "Overture", she meets with the head angel of Heaven, Adam, and the meeting does not go as planned, despite her attempts to inform him of her hotel. She seeks for the hotel to serve as an alternative to the annual Extermination of sinners from Hell by Adam's army of exterminator angels. Adam informs her that the next Extermination has been moved up by six months. In "Radio Killed the Video Star", she is shown to be very forgiving, as after Sir Pentious enters the hotel and is exposed for being a spy for Vox, Charlie takes pity on him and gives him a second chance. In "Scrambled Eggs", she leads trust exercises and other activities in the hotel, much to the other patrons' annoyance. In "Masquerade", when Charlie inadvertently causes Angel Dust to be beaten by his boss, she is very upset by this and apologizes incessantly when he returns to the hotel.

Charlie has a strained relationship with her father, Lucifer Morningstar, and calls him in the episode "Dad Beat Dad", where she asks him to visit the hotel. She shows him around and asks him to help her schedule another appointment with Heaven so that she can try to show them her hotel again. While Lucifer does not believe in her plan, he schedules a meeting for her, and ultimately he leaves the hotel on better terms with her.

In "Welcome to Heaven", when Charlie arrives at the meeting with Heaven, she speaks to several important angels and discovers that no one in Heaven knows how it is decided if a soul belongs in Heaven or Hell. Adam then reveals that Charlie's girlfriend Vaggie was one of his exterminator angels, leaving Charlie feeling shocked and betrayed, as Vaggie never told her. Charlie and Vaggie are then sent back to Hell, Heaven choosing to ignore their hotel yet again. In "Hello Rosie", after making a deal with Alastor, she is shown to be most successful in speaking and rallying crowds of people when she is singing, and she convinces the citizens of Cannibal Town to fight with her against the angels in the next Extermination. She also reconciles with Vaggie. In "The Show Must Go On", she fights against the angels alongside the patrons of the hotel and is shown to care very greatly for all of them.

=== Other appearances ===
==== Helluva Boss ====
Charlie makes a cameo appearance in the 2019 pilot for Helluva Boss, in which Loona is shown watching Charlie's broadcast pitch on her computer. Robo Fizz later mocks Charlie's broadcast in the 2020 Helluva Boss episode "Loo Loo Land". A plush doll of Charlie is visible in Emberlynn Pinkle's room in the third Helluva Short "Mission: Weeaboo-Boo".

==== Music videos ====
Charlie makes a silent cameo appearance in the 2020 music video for the song "Addict", in which she outstretches a hand to Angel Dust as he walks away after a tough day at work with Valentino.

==== Miscellaneous ====
Charlie appeared in an update video uploaded to Medrano's YouTube channel alongside the protagonist of Helluva Boss, Blitzo, in which a crossover between Helluva Boss and Hazbin Hotel was teased to be in the works.

== Reception ==
=== Pilot ===
Charlie Morningstar's character in the show's pilot was received positively. Esther Liberman of BeLatina described her as "redeemable and empathetic", and argued that the show's pilot demonstrated Charlie's biculturalism, with a "subtle analog to her flexible sexuality". Dan Short of Animated Views called Charlie the only "happy, uplifting soul within a sea of deviants" and said her voice actress provided the right tone to make Charlie "heavenly". Matthew Field of Go! & Express called Charlie "so darn loveable" and a cheerfully optimistic "do-gooder who tries to see the best in everyone". Reviewer Sean Cubillas for CBR described her one of the "most cheerful and elegantly voiced characters in all of animation".

=== Series ===
Charlie's character in the animated series, which began in January 2024, was also received positively. Hope Mullinax of Collider praised her "joyous" showstopping musical numbers, while Screen Rant complimented her "high energy pop beats" and "go-getter attitude", calling her "the heart and soul of Hazbin Hotel" without whom "the show would be very grim and somewhat pointless". Dais Johnston of Inverse lauded her as "the Leslie Knope of Hell" due to her "bright-eyed and always positive" attitude. Rendy Jones of RogerEbert.com called her "the sunny-side-up princess" with a "happy-go-lucky charm". Rachel Leishman of The Mary Sue argued that the series is "charming" because of Charlie's hopeful nature, which inspires her girlfriend Vaggie. Leishman also said that Charlie is "coming into her own and working hard to be a beacon of helpfulness for those she cares for at the hotel". Jenna Scherer of The A.V. Club described Charlie as "bright-eyed" and "strangely naive", while Kristy Puchko of Mashable called Charlie the "most childish and cheery of the crew". Brian Kitson of The Cosmic Circus complimented Henningsen's "light-hearted energy" as Charlie, while Sayantan Gayen of CBR praised Henningsen's "exemplary job of voicing a person cheery by nature but brought down by the massive weight of responsibilities on her shoulder".

== Merchandise ==
Since 2018, official clothing and merchandise based around Charlie and the cast of Hazbin Hotel designed by Medrano have been available intermittently from Shark Robot LLC.

== Appearances in other media ==
From 2019 to 2023, Jill Harris and Elsie Lovelock would reprise their roles as Charlie in a series of skits in HuniCast, a live podcast series co-hosted by Hazbin Hotel pilot animator Ashley Nichols, and Angel Dust's pilot voice actor, Michael Kovach, which often featured the cast and crew of Hazbin Hotel and SpindleHorse as guests.

From 2020 to 2021, Charlie appeared in a series of "Voxtagram" posts published to Instagram by staff members of SpindleHorse, depicting her as running the hotel's social media account with Vaggie in a slice-of-life style.

Elsie Lovelock, Charlie's pilot singing voice, has also appeared in two Hazbin Hotel fan music videos made by Gabriel C. Brown (Alastor's pilot singing voice): one was released in 2021 titled "Heaven 2 Hell", and one in 2024 titled "Thank You and Goodnight". The latter song was described as a "farewell" to the pilot cast voice actors, having been written a year prior (following the announcement that A24 would be re-casting), and released the day after the premiere of "Overture" as "a light-hearted and proverbial passing of the torch".

In October 2026, Fortnite announced its rollout of new collaboration skins for its Fortnitemares event, with Charlie, Alastor and Vaggie being purchasable skins in the Fortnite item shop.

== See also ==
- LGBTQ themes in Western animation
- List of animated series with LGBTQ characters: 2020–2024
- List of bisexual characters in animation
- List of demons in fiction
- List of fictional princesses
