= Michael Kovach =

American voice actor and singer (born 1995)

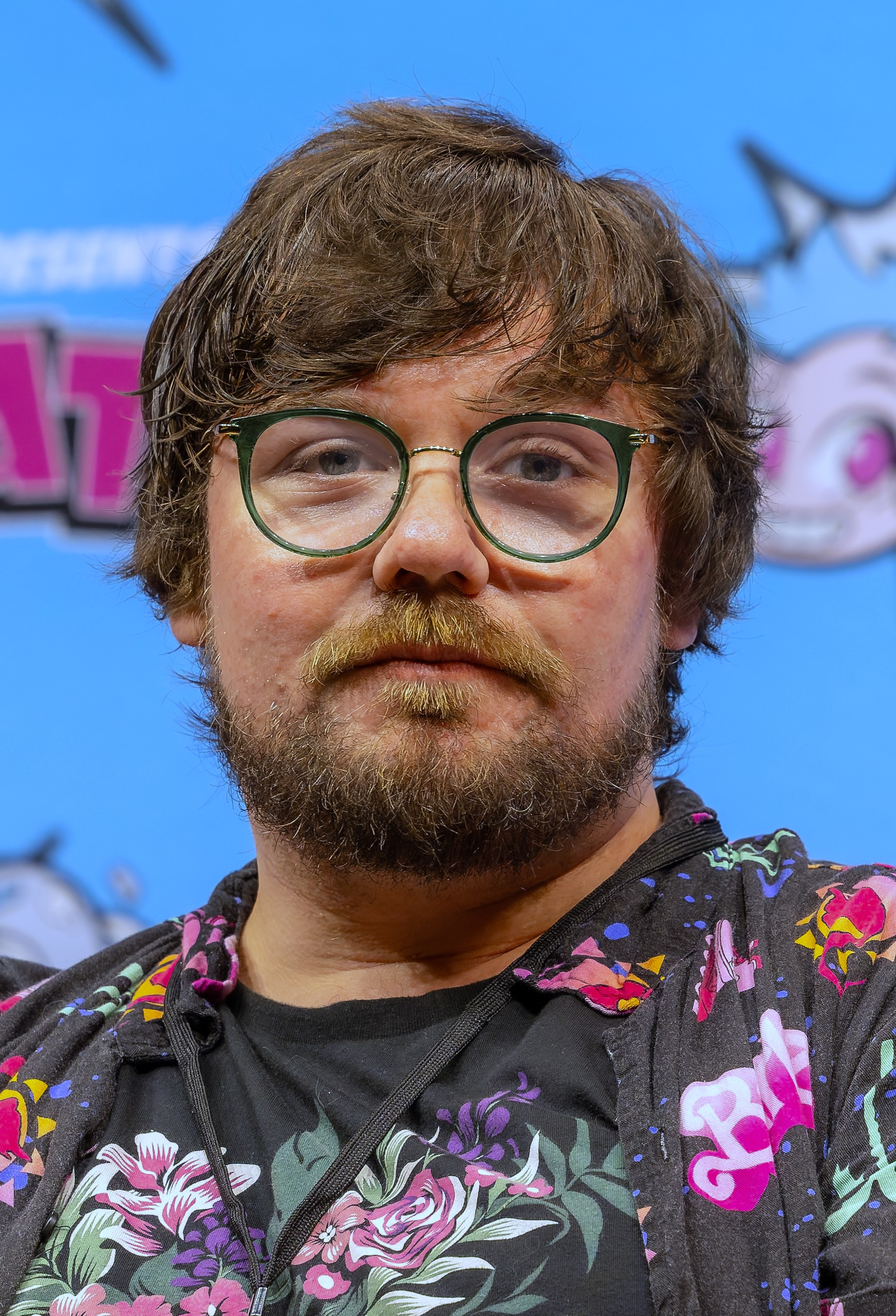
- Kovach in 2026
- Born: Michael James Kovach; June 17, 1995 (age 31); Youngstown, Ohio, U.S.
- Other name: kovox
- Occupations: Voice actor; singer
- Years active: 2014–present
- Known for: Serial Designation "N" in Murder Drones; Jax in The Amazing Digital Circus; Angel Dust in the pilot episode of Hazbin Hotel
- Website: kovox.net

Michael James Kovach (/koʊvætʃ/ KOH-vatch; born June 17, 1995), otherwise known as his pseudonym kovox, is an American voice actor and singer. He is best known for his roles in independent animation, most notably as Serial Designation "N" in Murder Drones, Jax in The Amazing Digital Circus, and Angel Dust in the pilot episode of Hazbin Hotel. Kovach has done voice acting for several video games including BROK the InvestiGator, Poppy Playtime, and Smite, among others.

== Early and personal life ==
Michael James Kovach was born on June 17, 1995, in Youngstown, Ohio, United States, the oldest of three children. According to an interview with The Comenian, Kovach had been interested in voice acting since he was young. Growing up, Kovach enjoyed cartoons including Sonic the Hedgehog and Mickey Mouse, which inspired him to delve into voice acting. Several of Kovach's inspirations for his style of voice acting include actors Tom Kenny, Rob Paulsen, Jim Cummings, and Frank Welker. Kovach is heteroromantic and asexual. He was in a relationship with animator and co-star on The Amazing Digital Circus Ashley Nichols from 2019 to 2025.

== Career ==
According to an interview with PopCulture.com, Kovach got his start in voice acting in the YouTube series Danganwrestling in 2014. Kovach's first notable role was as the character Angel Dust in the 2019 web series pilot for Hazbin Hotel, the role was later played by Blake Roman in the full series. Kovach was later featured in two series produced by Glitch Productions, Murder Drones and The Amazing Digital Circus. Since first appearing in Murder Drones in 2021, Kovach has become a recurring voice actor for Glitch Productions in several of their independently-animated web series. In 2023, Kovach voiced Rocky Rickaby in the pilot episode of Lackadaisy.

Besides independent animation, Kovach has been involved in voice acting for several notable video games including the survival horror Poppy Playtime (2021) as Doey the Doughman, and as Graff, R.J. and Guard in BROK the InvestiGator (2022).

== Filmography ==
=== Television ===
Year	Title	Role(s)	Notes	Ref.
2020	Akudama Drive	Additional voices		
2021	Dragon Goes House-Hunting	Letty		
2022	The Prince of Tennis II Special	Kanata Irie	OVA	
2022	Amaim Warrior at the Borderline	I-Les Nayuta		
2022	The Prince of Tennis II: U-17 World Cup	Kanata Irie		
2023	Kingdom	Zhang Yin, Jin Ren, additional voices	Season 3	
2024	Love Com	Additional voices		
2024	Reborn!	Nosaru		

=== Film ===
Year	Title	Role(s)	Notes	Ref.
2023	Lackadaisy	Rocky Rickaby	Short film	

=== Web ===
==== Pilots ====
Year	Title	Role(s)	Notes	Ref.
2019	Hazbin Hotel	Angel Dust	Episode: "That's Entertainment"	
2024	Pain Girl	Cakks		
2024	Animation Station with Millie Martins	Tabs the Cat		
2025	The Gaslight District	Diligence		
2025	Lumi and the Great Big Galaxy	Davin		
2026	Calling All Villains	Dave		
TBA	Zipped Up	Gadget		
TBA	Alice in Blankland	Cheshire Cat		

==== Series ====
Year	Title	Role(s)	Notes	Ref.
2019; 2021–23; 2026	Death Battle	Shazam, Goku Black, Asta, Gogeta, Vegito, Goku	Episodes 107, 149, 170, 171, 186 and 213	
2021–2024	Murder Drones	N, Reid, Braidon		
2022	SMG4	Niles, SMG0, Fred	Episode: "REVELATIONS" (Movie)	
2023	Caressing My Hibernating Bear	Airi	English dub	
2023–2026	The Amazing Digital Circus	Jax, Evil Jax		

==== Shorts ====
Year	Title	Role(s)	Notes	Ref.
2015	"Goku x Anne Frank: Until the End of Time" Animated Adaptation	Son Goku, Gurio Umino	Animated adaptation and parody of an infamous shipping fanfic	
2024	Glove and Beanie with Bait	Bait		

==== Podcasts ====
Year	Title	Role(s)	Notes	Ref.
2018–2024; 2026	HuniCast	Himself	Co-host	
2024–present	Clutch: A Kobold Story	Strap the Trapper		

=== Video games ===
Year	Title	Role(s)	Notes	Ref.
2014	Smite	Bioslicer Tsukuyomi		
2017	Embers of Magic	Babby Harpy		
2017	XOXO Droplets	Nurse Lynn		
2019	Blush Blush	Eli, Ichiban		
2019	Grand Guilds	Felix		
2021	Cris Tales	Azufra		
2021	Terrain of Magical Expertise	Skeight		
2021	Poppy Playtime	Doey, Rich, Scientist #4		
2022	Hush Hush: Only Your Love Can Save Them	Eli		
2022	BROK the InvestiGator	Graff, R.J., Guard		
2022	Beyond the Edge of Owlsgard	Raccoon		
2023	Komorebi	Taylor		
2024	Kiss/OFF	Xargazorg		
2024	Midnight Wave	Capsule Hotel Worker		
2025	Bby Don't Hurt Me	Waveform		
2026	Cookie Run: Kingdom	Jax Cookie		
2027	The Bunny Graveyard II	Claudio		
TBA	Billie Bust Up	Fantoccio		
