= That's Entertainment (Hazbin Hotel) =

- Hazbin Hotel episode
- YouTube thumbnail
- Directed by: Vivienne Medrano
- Written by: Dave Capdevielle; Raymond Hernandez; Vivienne Medrano
- Original air date: October 28, 2019
- Running time: 31 minutes

Episode chronology
← Previous —	Next → "Overture"

External videos
- Hazbin Hotel Full Episode Pilot: That's Entertainment — Official upload of the episode onto YouTube

"That's Entertainment" is the pilot episode of the American adult animated musical television series Hazbin Hotel, which premiered on YouTube on October 28, 2019. The episode was directed by series creator Vivienne "VivziePop" Medrano, who co-wrote it with Dave Capdevielle and Raymond Hernandez. It was independently financed and animated over the course of three years by Medrano's independent animation group, SpindleHorse.

Following the pilot's success, a spin-off series set in the same fictional universe, Helluva Boss, was produced by SpindleHorse, and a full television series was produced by SpindleHorse in association with Bento Box Entertainment and A24 for Amazon Prime Video, and started airing in January 2024.

== Plot ==
Charlie, the princess of Hell, mourns in the wake of an annual extermination of sinners by Heaven ("I'm Always Chasing Rainbows") (Note: A cover of the 1917 song "I'm Always Chasing Rainbows"). Accompanied by her girlfriend Vaggie, she goes on the news to announce pornstar Angel Dust to be their first test subject in the "Happy Hotel", seeking to redeem sinners in lieu of leaving their souls to be extinguished during extermination ("Inside of Every Demon Is a Rainbow"). Her proposal is mocked, particularly after a live news feed shows Angel Dust to be participating in a turf war at that moment, aiding his friend Cherri Bomb in a fight against Sir Pentious. At the news studio, tensions erupt and Charlie gets into a physical fight with anchor Katie Killjoy.

Charlie, Vaggie and Angel Dust return to the Happy Hotel, Vaggie chewing out Angel for his reckless behavior. Alastor "the Radio Demon", who saw Charlie's announcement and the resulting debacle on the news, comes to the hotel to offer his assistance in her endeavor for his own entertainment. Charlie accepts, despite her and Vaggie's misgivings. Alastor proceeds to summon Niffty and Husk to serve as the hotel's maid and bartender respectively, sings a song ("Alastor's Reprise"), and prevents Sir Pentious from destroying the hotel, before renaming it the "Hazbin Hotel".

== Cast ==
- Jill Harris as Charlie
  - Elsie Lovelock as Charlie's singing voice
- Michael Kovach as Angel Dust
- Monica Franco as Vaggie
- Edward Bosco as Alastor
  - Gabriel C. Brown as Alastor's singing voice
- Will Stamper as Sir Pentious
- Joe Gran as the Egg Boiz
- Faye Mata as Katie Killjoy
- Joshua Tomar as Tom Trench
- Krystal LaPorte as Cherri Bomb
- Michelle Marie as Niffty
- Mick Lauer as Husk
- Don Darryl Rivera as Travis
- Maxwell Atoms as the thief, the top hat demon, and additional voices
- James Monroe Iglehart as the bar patron
- Vivienne Medrano as additional voices
- Xander Mobus as additional voices

== Production and release ==
Several of the pilot's main characters had already existed in primitive forms for years when Medrano began working with people at School of Visual Arts on the "Misfit Demon Gang" in her webcomic series ZooPhobia. Many aspects of these characters would later become the protagonists of Hazbin Hotel. The pilot was intended to be an adult comedy "with a raunchy, demonic aesthetic". It took over six months to write the episode, and over two years to animate it, with teasers released in the ensuing period to garner an audience of fans.

The full episode was released on October 28, 2019, with a French dub released on May 8, 2020, and a Japanese dub released on September 16, 2020.

== Reception ==
The pilot was critically acclaimed, with Go! & Express calling it part of the "animation renaissance" on YouTube. The MSU Reporter praised the show's "raunchy sense of humor and quirky art style". Comic Book Resources called it "a clear labor of love", and Screen Rant praised it for having "quirky, ambitious, and dark humor" and some of the "fastest, wittiest, and raunchiest dialogue ever seen in independent animation".

In August 2020, in response to the series' acclaim, A24 picked up Hazbin Hotel for the production of a full series, co-produced with Bento Box Entertainment, with a new cast of voice actors. The series premiered its first eight-episode season from January 19 to February 2, 2024, and aired the second season on October 29, 2025.

== See also ==
- Modern animation in the United States
- Adult animation by country
- List of adult animated television series
  - List of adult animated television series of the 2010s
  - List of adult animated television series of the 2020s
