= SpindleHorse =

American independent animation studio

SpindleHorse Toons
- Type: Private
- Industry: Animation
- Founded: 2018; 8 years ago
- Founders: Vivienne Medrano
- Headquarters: Burbank, California, U.S.
- Key people: Vivienne Medrano (CEO/CFO); Allison Medrano (secretary); Sam Miller (art director); Skye Henwood (animation director); Tom Murray (head of production); Cécilia Goncalves (design lead); Sam Haft (lead composer); Richard Horvitz (voice director)
- Products: Hazbin Hotel; Helluva Boss
- Owner: Vivienne Medrano
- Divisions: SpindleRoo
- Website: spindlehorse.com

SpindleHorse, doing business as SpindleHorse Toons, is an American independent animation studio founded by Vivienne "VivziePop" Medrano in 2018, based in Burbank, California. It is responsible for the Hellaverse shared universe animated series, whose main series Hazbin Hotel is co-animated with Bento Box Entertainment and co-produced with A24. It was the sole animation studio of its spin-off series, Helluva Boss until 2025, when Amazon Prime offered to co-produce Helluva Boss.

SpindleHorse has also produced several animated shorts, including Holidaze and the ZooPhobia short Bad Luck Jack, all of which are available on Medrano's YouTube channel. Medrano has stated that the company's name comes from a childhood character of hers named Spindle.

== History ==
Vivenne Medrano founded the animation studio SpindleHorse, under which the pilot for Hazbin Hotel, the pilot and first two seasons of Helluva Boss, and several animated shorts would be released. Medrano serves as the director, lead writer and lead character designer for SpindleHorse. In an interview with Cartoon Brew, she said that much of the Hazbin Hotel pilot was funded by money from her Patreon, rather than income from YouTube's algorithm. The company Horseless Cowboy assisted Medrano with voice casting during the first season of Helluva Boss, with Richard Steven Horvitz serving as the voice director. Cartoon Brew described her as a "paragon of indie success in animation".

In October 2019, the pilot episode of Hazbin Hotel was released on Medrano's YouTube channel. In November 2019, the pilot episode of Helluva Boss was released to her YouTube channel as well. On December 25, 2019, a short entitled "Holidaze" was released. In July 2020, Medrano released an animated music video for Hazbin Hotel called "Addict", featuring the Silva Hound song of the same name. In August 2020, Hazbin Hotel was picked up for a full series by A24. Animation Magazine said that A24 was taking a "bold step" by picking up the series. In 2023, scholar Ben Mitchell described Medrano's Hazbin Hotel and Helluva Boss as series which were "sensationally popular" and an effective use of Patreon to subsidize the show's art "through monthly tiered payments". Hazbin Hotel would go on to be released in January 2024 to critical acclaim.

On September 30, 2020, Medrano released an animated short film titled "Bad Luck Jack", based on her webcomic ZooPhobia. The short was nominated for and won for a Ursa Major Award in the "Best Dramatic Short Work" category. The short was also listed as a "Recommended Anthropomorphic Dramatic Short Work" on the Ursa Major Award website. From 2020 to 2021, Medrano released several "Voxtagram" animated clips of the characters of Hazbin Hotel and Helluva Boss in a crossover slice-of-life setting to a series of in-character Instagram accounts run by SpindleHorse employees, alongside normal posts of character art depicting characters' selfies.

In August 2025, Medrano announced the creation of an Australian division of SpindleHorse, called SpindleRoo. Its first production was a pilot for an animated adaptation of the webcomic Homestuck. It was the first SpindleHorse project not built around Medrano's stories or characters. She expressed her excitement for this project to Polygon in a September 2025 interview, saying it will be "very experimental" and called it a "test pilot" for many aspects, including "the studio, the process, a new style, [and] a new technology," adding that audience reaction will determine whether studios are interested in developing it into a full animated series, or if it will be continued on her YouTube channel. She also told the publication that she hoped that the project would open the door for SpindleHorse working with other creators and "more original projects", to support other voices apart from her own ideas.

At the 2026 Annecy International Animation Film Festival, Warner Bros. Pictures Animation announced that Medrano would be directing a new feature film titled Prehistoria, which will be released theatrically. At the LVL Up Expo in 2026 Medrano announced there would be a new series of ZooPhobia shorts coming out. In a 2026 interview with Polygon Medrano spoke about these two projects saying "And Prehistoria and Zoophobia are finding their place in the schedule. They're a little fresher, there's a little less direness for them to come out immediately, so there's a lot more time."

== Animation productions ==
=== Television series ===
Title	Released	Original network(s)	Notes	Ref.
"That's Entertainment"	2019	YouTube	Hazbin Hotel pilot	
Helluva Boss	2019–present	YouTube; Amazon Prime Video		
Hazbin Hotel	2024–present	Amazon Prime Video	Co-production with Bento Box and A24	

=== Web series ===
Title	Released	Original network(s)	Notes	Ref.
Homestuck - The Animated Pilot	2025	YouTube	Pilot, under SpindleRoo	

=== Music videos ===
Title	Released	Original network(s)	Notes	Ref.
"Oh Millie"	2020	YouTube	Helluva Boss music video	
"Addict"	2020	YouTube	Hazbin Hotel music video	
"Just Look My Way"	2023	YouTube	Helluva Boss music video	
"Polkamania!"	2024	YouTube	"Vampire" segment	
"Everything Is Fine (Remix)"	2025	YouTube	Helluva Boss segment	
"Shark Boy Summer"	2026	YouTube	Helluva Boss music video	

=== Shorts ===
Title	Released	Original network(s)	Ref.
"Holidaze"	2019	YouTube	
"Bad Luck Jack"	2020	YouTube	
Helluva Shorts	2024–present	YouTube	

== See also ==
- Glitch Productions, another independent animation studio which commonly produces shows on YouTube and streaming services.
