= Joel Perez =

American actor (born 1986)

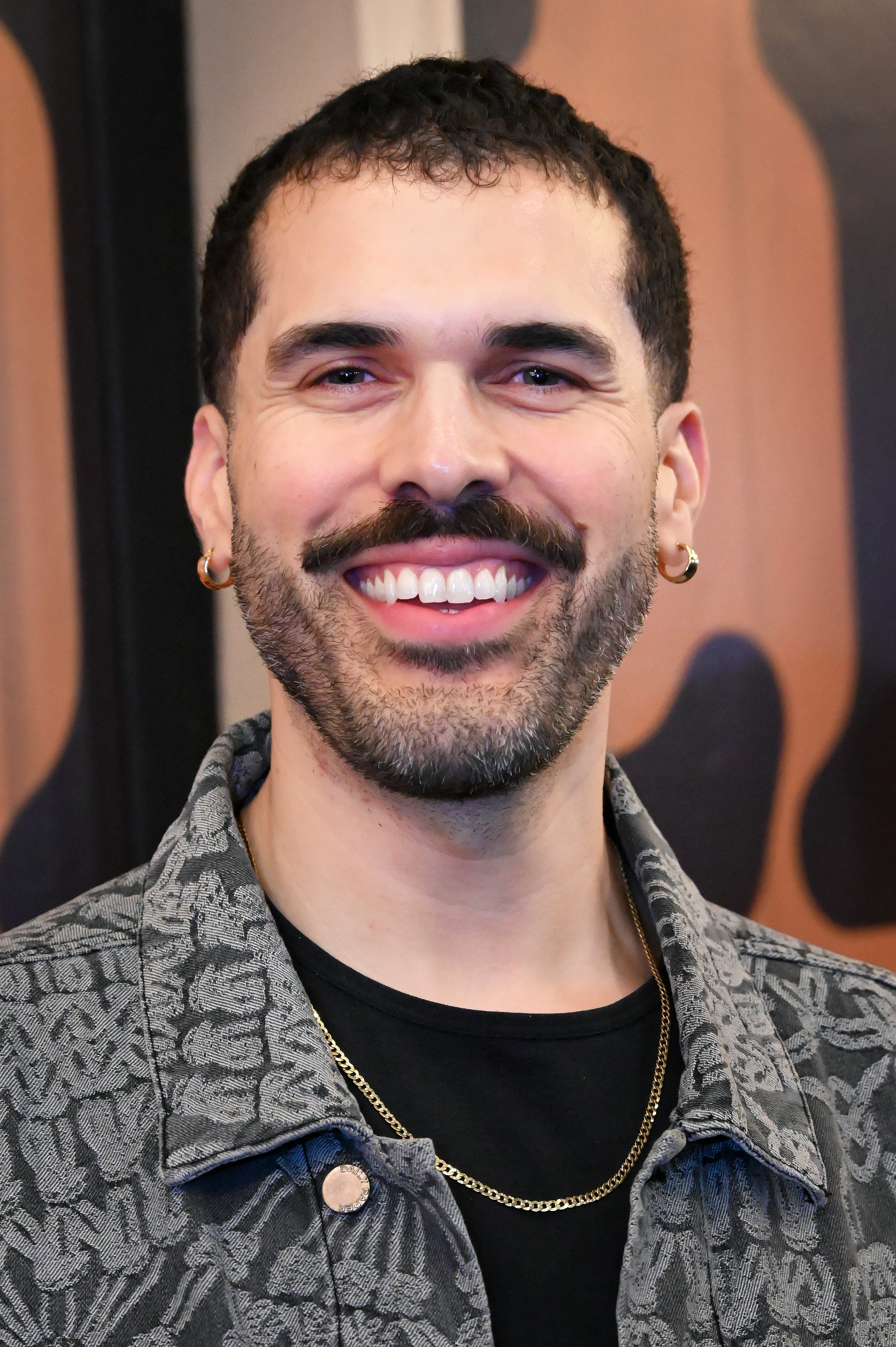
- Perez in 2025
- Born: Joel Jafet Perez; June 12, 1986 (age 40); Boston, Massachusetts, U.S.
- Education: Tufts University (BA)
- Occupation: Actor
- Years active: 2010–present
- Spouse: Adrian Ferbeyre (m. 2019)
- Website: www.misterjoelperez.com

Joel Perez (born June 12, 1986) is an American actor known for his work in several theatrical performances and television appearances.

== Early life ==
Perez was born on June 12, 1986, in Boston, and grew up in Lawrence, Massachusetts, United States. He is of Puerto Rican descent. His father is a Pastor in a church, and he was first introduced to singing at a young age in church. He graduated from Central Catholic High School in Lawrence in 2004. In eighth grade, Perez starred in the Fellowship Christian Academy's production of Cinderella as The Herald. He later starred in his high school's production of Bye Bye Birdie as Conrad Birdie.

Perez attended Tufts University, graduating in 2008. There, he performed in productions of Children of Eden and Hair. He studied for a semester at the British American Drama Academy in London. He also studied at the Upright Citizens Brigade Theatre his junior year of college.

== Career ==
After graduating from college in 2008, Perez was accepted into the American Theater Wing Program Springboard NYC. During this time, Perez was involved with Stage Source and auditioned for In the Heights and the Williamstown Theater Festival. He also received a call-back audition a year and a half later for In the Heights. After six auditions, Perez joined the play on its national tour. When he returned to NYC, he acquired his real estate license and began working as an agent, before working a number of other jobs including as a PA for the PBS show History Detectives.

Perez began his career in 2010 with a role in the national tour of the Tony Award-winning musical In the Heights. While touring for In the Heights he appeared in the film BoyBand.

In 2013, Perez played Mark, Pete, Roy, and Bobby Jeremy, one out of only two parts for men, in the world premiere Public Theater off-Broadway production of Fun Home. Perez became involved with the work in its earliest stages. While at the Sundance Theater Lab in Jacksonville, Florida, Perez met with Lisa Kron and Jeanine Tesori, creators of the adaption of Alison Bechdel's work. At the time, Perez was working on Stuck Elevator. He quickly befriended the two, and they asked him to be in the play. In April 2015, Perez travelled with the show to Broadway at the Circle in the Square Theatre, where it won five Tony Awards.

Most recently, Perez played the roles of Vittorio Vidal, Daddy Brubeck, and Herman in The New Group's off-Broadway revival of Sweet Charity. Perez also starred in Broadway Sings, an annual concert started in 2011 by Corey Mach that celebrates and reinvents pop icons' music.

Perez also co-wrote the short film Beautiful, FL with his husband, Adrian Ferbeyre, for Disney's Launchpad series. In addition to co-writing the short, he starred as Copernicus Cruz, the judge in the main protagonist's ice cream competition. The film was directed by Gabriel Ortega and was released on Disney+ on September 29, 2023.

=== Broken Box Mime Theater Company ===
Perez has been a member of the Broken Box Mime Theater Company in New York since its inception in 2011. Broken Box finds its roots in a student-run mime troupe named HYPE at Tufts University. Perez's work as a mime serves as a "home-base" away from the glitz and glamour of Broadway. Creating a skit is a collaborative process between actors and not primarily guided by a playwright. Most of the company's pieces are accompanied by contemporary music, which helps establish a mood for a given performance. Broken Box won the 2014 New York Innovative Theater Award for Outstanding Ensemble.

== Critical reception ==
Perez was praised by Jay Barmann in his role as Marco in Stuck Elevator. Barmann writes in SFist, "Joel Perez deserves praise as well for his role as Guang's coworker Marco, and for adding layers of rap and rhythm to the piece." He was also well received for his work in Fun Home's on-Broadway production. Jesse Green writes for Vulture.com, "Joel Perez, with three small roles—including two different young men the father tries to seduce—nails all of them. (He's also a hoot as the bespangled lead singer in a Partridge Family takeoff called 'Raincoat Made of Love'." Green described Fun Home at the Public Theater in 2013, which Perez acted in as well, as "hilarious and crushing," which also remained true for his viewing of its Broadway production. In his role in Sweet Charity as Vittorio Vidal, Michael Dale describes Perez as "marvelously hot-headed, but gracious in the role and sings the sweeping ballad 'Too Many Tomorrows' with elevated movie star passion."

== Awards ==
Perez won the Goddard Rhetorical Prize in 2008, and won the 2017 Lucille Lortel Award for Outstanding Featured Actor in Musical for his work in Sweet Charity.

== Personal life ==
Perez has been an out gay man since 2007. He has been married to his husband, Adrian Ferbeyre, since 2019.

== Acting credits ==
=== Theatre ===
| Year | Title | Role | Notes |
|---|---|---|---|
| 2010 | In the Heights | Ensemble | National tour |
| 2013 | Stuck Elevator | Marco | A.C.T. |
| 2013–2014 | Fun Home | Mark/Pete/Roy/Bobby Jeremy | The Public Theater |
| 2014 | The Mapmaker's Opera | Diego Clemente | New York Musical Theatre Festival |
| 2015–2016 | Fun Home | Mark/Pete/Roy/Bobby Jeremy | Broadway |
| 2016–2017 | Sweet Charity | Vittorio/Daddy Brubeck/Herman/Charlie | The New Group (Off-Broadway) |
| 2022–2023 | Kiss My Aztec | Pepe | Berkeley Repertory Theatre |

=== Film ===
| Year | Title | Role | Notes |
|---|---|---|---|
| 2010 | The Last Harbor | Luis | |
| 2010 | BoyBand | Jordan | |
| 2011 | Today __cks | Asshole | Short film |
| 2012 | Marranos | Gabriel | |
| 2014 | Family With Fire | Bill Cassidy | Short film |
| 2015 | Strange Past | Tom | Short film |
| 2021 | Tick, Tick… Boom! | Lincoln | |

=== Television ===
| Year | Title | Role | Notes |
|---|---|---|---|
| 2012 | The Big C | Miguel | 1 episode |
| 2014 | Person of Interest | Mask | 1 episode |
| 2015 | Black Box | Mexican Carson | 1 episode |
| 2016 | The Outs | Eli | Web series, 4 episodes |
| 2017 | Odd Mom Out | Carlos | 2 episodes |
| 2018 | Jesus Christ Superstar Live in Concert | Ensemble | Live musical |
| 2024–present | Hazbin Hotel | Valentino (voice) | Recurring role |

=== Web ===
| Year | Title | Role | Notes |
|---|---|---|---|
| 2023 | Helluva Boss | Dr. Somna/Mariachi Imp (voice) | 1 episode ("Western Energy") |
