= Vivienne Medrano =

American animator and producer (born 1992)

- Medrano at GalaxyCon San Jose in 2025
- Born: October 28, 1992 (age 34)
- Other name: VivziePop
- Education: School of Visual Arts (BFA)
- Occupations: Animator; television director; writer; YouTuber
- Years active: 2011–present
- Notable work: Hazbin Hotel; Helluva Boss; ZooPhobia
- Title: Founder of SpindleHorse

YouTube information
- Channel: SpindleHorse
- Genres: Animation; comedy; horror; musical
- Subscribers: 11.2 million
- Views: 1.9 billion
- Last updated: October 19, 2026

Vivienne Medrano (born October 28, 1992), also known by her pseudonym VivziePop, is an American animator, YouTuber, writer, director, and producer. She is best known as the creator of the musical television series Hazbin Hotel and the web series Helluva Boss. She also created the webcomic ZooPhobia.

== Early life ==
Medrano was born on October 28, 1992, grew up in Maryland and is a Salvadoran-American. She has two siblings, Maritza and Ana. She became interested in animation as a child when she watched the film Bambi. She began using art programs such as Microsoft Paint in third grade. Her early art was heavily influenced by Invader Zim. Medrano moved to New York City and began attending School of Visual Arts in September 2010 and would later graduate in 2014.

== Career ==
=== Early work ===
Prior to joining YouTube, Medrano did assistant work on a thesis horror comedy film by Zach Bellissimo titled Blenderstein, in 2011.

Before launching her current channel "VivziePop", Medrano launched her first channel, "xZoOPhobiAx", which features animatics for ZooPhobia.

Medrano launched her YouTube channel under the screen name "VivziePop" in 2012, building a dedicated online audience, who enjoyed her fanwork and original creations. Also in 2012, she started a webcomic titled ZooPhobia, which ran until 2016, ending so that she could find more time to develop Hazbin Hotel. Medrano directed her first short animated film, titled The Son of 666 in 2013. Medrano released her fourth year thesis film entitled "Timber" in 2014, for which she won a Dusty Award in Outstanding Achievement in Character Animation. Medrano named the film after the song of the same name by Pitbull and Kesha, and its score contained homages to the song as well.

In October 2014, she released an animated music video for the song "Die Young" by Kesha, which accumulated over 50 million views by October 2019. As a result, she became "relatively well-known" online for her animation and artwork, some of which she shared on her channel. In September 2025, Medrano said she would love to develop the world of "Timber" in the future, adding she has "projects that are...in my head that I would love to work on. It's just about finding the time."

Medrano received a Bachelor in Fine Arts and graduated from School of Visual Arts in August 2014. She worked as a freelance animator for two years. She continued to work on her webcomic ZooPhobia until 2016 when she ended it to focus her attention on Hazbin Hotel. Hazbin Hotel would be crowdfunded through Patreon.

=== SpindleHorse ===
Medrano founded the animation studio SpindleHorse, under which the pilot for Hazbin Hotel, the pilot and first season for Helluva Boss, and several animated shorts would be released. Medrano serves as the director, writer and character designer for SpindleHorse Toons. In an interview with Cartoon Brew, she said that much of the Hazbin Hotel pilot was funded by money from her Patreon, rather than income from YouTube's algorithm. The company Horseless Cowboy assisted Medrano with voice casting during the first season of Helluva Boss, with Richard Steven Horvitz serving as the voice director. Cartoon Brew described her as a "paragon of indie success in animation".

In October 2019, the pilot episode of Hazbin Hotel was released on Medrano's YouTube channel. By September 2025, it had garnered over 117 million views. In November 2019, the pilot of Helluva Boss was released on her YouTube channel as well. In July 2020, Medrano released an animated music video for Hazbin Hotel called "Addict", featuring the Silva Hound song of the same name. In August 2020, Hazbin Hotel was picked up for a full series by A24. Animation Magazine said that A24 was taking a "bold step" by picking up the series. In 2023, scholar Ben Mitchell described Medrano's Hazbin Hotel and Helluva Boss as series which were "sensationally popular" and an effective use of Patreon to subsidize the show's art "through monthly tiered payments".

On September 30, 2020, Medrano released an animated short film titled "Bad Luck Jack", based on ZooPhobia. The short won an Ursa Major Award in the "Best Dramatic Short Work" category. The short was also listed as a "Recommended Anthropomorphic Dramatic Short Work" on the Ursa Major Award website. In September 2025, Medrano said she would like to do more with the webcomic's characters, possibly including more animated shorts and a graphic novel, the latter of which she wanted do as a college student.

On April 25, 2025, it was announced that Helluva Boss would now be available on Amazon Prime Video as well as YouTube, with Medrano expressing that she was grateful to Prime Video for the opportunity and what it "means for the continued rise of indie animation." It was later reported that Medrano, and Spindlehorse itself, would retain "full creative control and final cut on the series." The Hollywood Reporter also stated that Medrano had signed a "first-look deal with Prime Video to develop new projects."

In August 2025, it was announced that the Australian studio branch of Spindlehorse, Spindleroo, would be releasing an 11-minute animated pilot for the webcomic Homestuck. It will be the first project for Spindlehorse not built around Medrano's story or characters. She expressed her excitement about this project to Polygon, in September 2025, saying it will be "very experimental" and called it a "test pilot" for many aspects, including "the studio, the process, a new style, [and] a new technology," adding that audience reaction will determine whether studios are interested in developing it into a full animated series, or if it will be continued on her YouTube channel. She also told the publication that she hoped that the project would be opening the door for Spindlehorse working with additional creators, like artists or those who created webcomics, with "more original projects," to support other voices apart from her own ideas.

In September 2025, Medrano revealed that she has a five season-plan for Hazbin Hotel and a four season-plan for Helluva Boss, with seasons 3 and 4 of Hazbin Hotel and Helluva Boss already in production, respectively. She described the second season of Hazbin Hotel as what the show was "meant to be" in terms of visuals, scale, narrative, pacing, and everything else, noting that the first season was "made in a vacuum" because she didn't know "if the show would continue". She also stated that while the original pilot of Helluva Boss has a "very special place in her heart", it functionally does not work with the rest of the show, calling "Mission Zero" a new "starting point" for the series and new audiences.

=== Other work ===
From 2017 to 2019, she worked as an animator on Nico Colaleo's DreamWorksTV series, Too Loud. She called her experience on the series "a delight". She also worked as a character designer on the series. In March 2021, it was reported that she was a partner of Redefine Entertainment, a management company formed by Jairo Alvarado, Tony Gil, and Max Goldfarb.

During the 2026 Annecy International Animation Film Festival, Medrano was confirmed to be writing and directing an animated film for Warner Bros. Pictures Animation titled Prehistoria. The film marks her feature-length directorial debut.

== Personal life ==
Medrano is bisexual, and on the asexual spectrum. She grew up Presbyterian, and says she remembers going to church and questioning a lot of stories in the Bible, such as Adam and Eve and Lucifer.

In a January 2024 interview following the release of Hazbin Hotel on Amazon Prime Video, she described herself as a "queer woman on the internet who made something popular", and related herself to her character Charlie Morningstar, saying that both she and Charlie are in a "position of fighting uphill battles to just have [their] dreams exist." Previously, Medrano had described herself, on social media, as a "proud 'fiery' [L]atina," and said that Vaggie was the character she related to most, saying that Vaggie and Charlie "feel like sides of [her]self."

In August 2021, she stated that she has ADHD.

== Filmography ==
=== Film and pilots ===
Title	Year	Credited as					Notes
Title	Year	Director	Writer	Producer	Animation/Art	Other	Notes
Blenderstein!	2011	No	No	No	No	Yes	Assistant
The Son of 666	2013	Yes	Yes	Yes	Yes	Yes	Creator
Timber	2014	Yes	Yes	Yes	Yes	Yes	Creator
Hand-Drawn: 2D Documentary	2019	No	No	No	No	Yes	As herself
"That's Entertainment"	2019	Yes	Yes	Yes	Yes	Yes	Hazbin Hotel pilot
Bad Luck Jack	2020	Yes	Yes	No	No	No	ZooPhobia short
Homestuck: The Animated Pilot	2025	No	No	Executive	No	No	Homestuck animated series pilot
Prehistoria	TBA	Yes	Yes	TBA	TBA	TBA	First animated film with Warner Bros. Pictures Animation

=== Television ===
Title	Year	Credited as					Notes
Title	Year	Director	Writer	Producer	Animation/Art	Other	Notes
Hazbin Hotel	2024–present	Yes	Yes	Yes	No	No	Creator

=== Web series ===
Title	Year	Credited as					Voice role	Notes
Title	Year	Writer	Executive Producer	Director	Animation/Art	Actress	Voice role	Notes
Too Loud	2017–19	No	No	No	Yes	No	Sarah	Animator and character designer
Helluva Boss	2019–present	Yes	Yes	Yes	Yes	Yes	Keenie, Deerie, various characters	Creator
Ollie & Scoops	2019–present	No	No	No	No	Yes	Poopsie St. Pierre	
Eddsworld	2021	No	No	No	No	Yes	Face Painter	Episode: "The Beaster Bunny"
Normal British Series	2022	No	No	No	No	Yes	ButtMunch	Episode: "Being British"

=== Music videos ===
Year	Title	Artist
2024	"Polkamania!" ("Vampire" segment)	"Weird Al" Yankovic
