= The Four Seasons (TV series) =

American comedy series

- Promotional release poster
- Genre: Comedy drama
- Created by: Tina Fey & Lang Fisher & Tracey Wigfield
- Based on: The Four Seasons by Alan Alda
- Starring: Tina Fey; Will Forte; Kerri Kenney-Silver; Marco Calvani; Erika Henningsen; Colman Domingo; Steve Carell
- Music by: Jeff Richmond
- Country of origin: United States
- Original language: English
- No. of seasons: 2
- No. of episodes: 16

Production
- Executive producers: Tina Fey; Lang Fisher; Tracey Wigfield; Jeff Richmond; Eric Gurian; David Miner
- Producer: Bill Sell
- Cinematography: Tim Orr
- Editors: Ken Eluto; Kyle Gilman; Martina Nilgitsalanont; Lillian Pachter
- Running time: 27–35 minutes
- Production companies: Little Stranger Inc.; 3 Arts Entertainment; Original Langster; Big Wig Productions; Universal Television

Original release
- Network: Netflix
- Release: May 1, 2025 – present

Related
- Girls5eva

The Four Seasons is an American comedy drama series created by Tina Fey, Lang Fisher, and Tracey Wigfield for Netflix, starring Fey, Steve Carell, Colman Domingo, and Will Forte. It is an adaptation of the 1981 film of the same name, which was written and directed by Alan Alda, who has a guest role in the series. Like the original film, the series follows a group of married friends and how life changes for the couples over the course of the seasonal trips they take together.

The series premiered on Netflix on May 1, 2025. In May 2025, the series was renewed for a second season, which premiered on May 28, 2026. In June 2026, the series was renewed for a third season.

== Cast ==
=== Main ===
- Tina Fey as Kate, a take-charge, practical homemaker and Jack's wife
- Will Forte as Jack, an anxious schoolteacher and Kate's husband
- Steve Carell (season 1, guest season 2) as Nick Pagano, Anne's soon-to-be ex-husband and a hedge fund manager
- Colman Domingo as Danny, a level-headed, sarcastic architect and Claude's husband, who previously dated Kate in college before coming out as gay, though they remain close friends
- Kerri Kenney-Silver as Anne, Nick's soon-to-be ex-wife
- Marco Calvani as Claude, an enthusiastic Italian homemaker and Danny's husband
- Erika Henningsen as Ginny, a young dental hygienist whom Nick dates after divorcing Anne. She later becomes mother to their son, Eugene, whom Claude nicknames Gino.

=== Recurring ===
- Julia Lester as Lila, Anne and Nick's daughter
- Steven Pasquale as Mark Brett (season 2), Jack's new friend who becomes romantically interested in Anne

=== Guest ===
- Alan Alda as Don, Anne's father. Alda wrote, directed, and portrayed Jack Burroughs in the original film.
- Ashlyn Maddox as Beth, Kate and Jack's daughter
- Jacob Buckenmyer as Lumberjack
- Toby Huss as Terry, a man that Anne is dating
- Tommy Do as Colby, Ginny's friend
- Taylor Ortega as Rachel, one of Ginny's friends
- Simone Recasner as Sarah, another one of Ginny's friends
- Chloe Troast as Mikayla, a guest service representative at Courtyard Marriott
- Cole Tristan Murphy as Kyler, the son of Marty who owns the funeral home
- Jack Gore as Kayden
- Vernee Watson as Beverly (season 2), Danny's mother
- David Tennant as Gianpiero (season 2), Claude and Danny's new neighbor in Italy who later becomes Anne's neighbor

== Production ==
The series is an adaptation of the Alan Alda 1981 film The Four Seasons, by Tina Fey, Lang Fisher, and Tracey Wigfield for Netflix. It was produced by Little Stranger Inc. All three writers are executive producers, along with David Miner, Eric Gurian and Jeff Richmond. Alda and Marissa Bregman, daughter of the film's producer, Martin Bregman, are producers of the series. Fey also stars in the series, and in April 2024 was joined by Steve Carell, and in June 2024 by Colman Domingo, Erika Henningsen, Will Forte, and Kerri Kenney-Silver. Marco Calvani later joined in August 2024.

In March 2025, it was revealed that Julia Lester, Alan Alda, Ashlyn Maddox, Jacob Buckenmyer, Taylor Ortega, Simone Recasner, Toby Edward Huss, Tommy Do, Chloe Troast, Jack Gore and Cole Tristan Murphy joined the show as guest stars. Filming took place in the state of New York in the second half of 2024. Filming also took place in Puerto Rico for season one.

Two weeks following the premiere of the first season, Netflix renewed the series for a second season. In October 2025, Steven Pasquale was cast in a recurring capacity for the second season. Filming locations on season two included Poughkeepsie, the Jersey Shore, and Trento, Italy. Domingo directed the first episode of season two and stated: "I leaned into 360 turns and group elements, so that when the show goes on and it's more complicated, you're going to long for that feeling again. You see people from above, coming in and out, flowing together — that sense of community you can get with your camera lenses. And then when it falls apart, you miss it... It's made me a more patient actor as well, looking at what a director has to do, and how they're there way before you, prepping. A lot of times, actors come to the set like, "Why is this set up this way?" There's all these reasons."

In June 2026, Netflix renewed the series for an eight-episode third season, with the main cast returning. Filming locations included Reykjavík, Iceland.

== Episodes ==
=== Series overview ===
Season	Episodes	Originally released
1	8	May 1, 2025
2	8	May 28, 2026

=== Season 1 (2025) ===
No. overall	No. in season	Title	Directed by	Written by	Original release date
1	1	"Lake House"	Robert Pulcini & Shari Springer Berman	Tina Fey & Lang Fisher & Tracey Wigfield	May 1, 2025
In the spring, married friends Nick and Anne, Kate and Jack, and Danny and Claude spend a weekend at Nick and Anne's lake house for their 25th anniversary. Nick reveals to Danny and Jack that he is planning to divorce Anne, while Claude confides in Kate that Danny has a heart condition. Jack urges Nick to reconsider, despite Anne's attitude during an outing on the lake. Danny lies to Claude about a work trip to postpone his upcoming angioplasty, and Jack tells Kate that Nick is leaving Anne. The following morning, Danny, Kate, and Jack discover Anne has sent Nick on an errand to surprise him with a wedding vow renewal ceremony.
2	2	"Garden Party"	Robert Pulcini & Shari Springer Berman	Josh Siegal & Dylan Morgan	May 1, 2025
Jack struggles not to reveal Nick's feelings to Anne, who has invited all her friends and family and is remaking a wedding gift in the pottery kiln Nick installed for her. No one can reach Nick, and Danny admits to Claude that he lied, while Jack cannot bring himself to tell Anne. Kate tries to break the news, but realizes Anne may already know and is attempting to save her marriage. Nick returns, and Claude serenades the guests with "You're Still the One"; Danny is forced to admit to another lie, but decides to go through with surgery. Anne delivers her heartfelt vows, but before Nick can speak, the kiln explodes.
3	3	"Eco Resort"	Oz Rodriguez	Vali Chandrasekaran	May 1, 2025
In the summer, Nick has left Anne, and he and the others visit a tropical eco hotel picked by Ginny, his adventurous and much younger new girlfriend. The others are uncomfortable with the rustic accommodations and with Ginny, but Danny pretends to enjoy himself for Nick's sake, while Kate and Jack believe Nick is secretly unhappy. Recovering from his procedure, Danny is doted on by Claude, and they sneak off to a nearby luxury resort. Nick climbs a rocky cliff to impress Ginny and injures his foot stepping on a sea urchin, but insists to Kate and Jack that he is happier than ever. At the resort, Danny is shocked to see Anne.
4	4	"Beach Bar"	Oz Rodriguez	Matt Whitaker	May 1, 2025
Anne admits that she came to confront the group but decided against it, and Danny encourages her to enjoy her own solo vacation. After making an unsuccessful pass at her surfing instructor, she finds catharsis in smashing souvenirs. Danny feels smothered by Claude, while Jack and Kate make an effort with Ginny, who leads everyone in a drunken night of dancing. Claude and Danny mention their open marriage, and Ginny reveals her last relationship was open, to Nick's discomfort. Kate embarrasses Jack with an unflattering story, and Danny upsets Claude by doing cocaine. Forced to evacuate due to a hurricane warning, the group commandeers a pedal pub to Anne's hotel. As the others apologize to Anne, Nick asks Ginny to officially be his girlfriend, and she happily accepts; Jack and Kate make up; and Claude learns Danny will be away on business for months.
5	5	"Family Weekend"	Jeff Richmond	Tina Fey	May 1, 2025
In the fall, the group visits Kate, Jack, and Danny's alma mater, where Kate and Jack's daughter, Beth, and Anne and Nick's daughter, Lila, are now students. Staying at the Lucy Flucker Knox Inn, they discover Anne has stolen Nick's suite, and she is upset to be introduced to Ginny, who tries to make a good impression. Lila has written a play, acting out her resentment toward Nick for breaking up their family and dating Ginny. Nick demands an apology, but Anne and Ginny each suggest he listen to his daughter. Jack struggles to make the weekend romantic, until Kate joins him in reliving their college days. Danny and Claude invite a stranger for a threesome, but Claude finds Danny's cigarettes while looking for condoms. Furious at Danny for not taking care of his health and being gone for months, Claude kicks him out of their room.
6	6	"Ultimate Frisbee"	Colman Domingo	John Riggi	May 1, 2025
Claude remains upset with Danny, and Nick and Lila are still angry with each other, but the group enjoys a game of ultimate frisbee. Kate is fed up with taking care of Jack, who accuses her of being jealous of Nick for restarting his life. Ginny and Claude, both feeling out of place, take a scooter tour together, while Nick has an honest conversation with Lila. Offended when Kate drunkenly criticizes Claude, Danny rushes to find him after a minor scooter accident, and they reconcile. After an emotional run-in with Anne, Jack admits to a drunk Kate that they kissed. Laughing, Kate finds a distraught Anne and reassures her that things will get easier. As everyone returns home, Nick and Anne make peace; Lila apologizes to Ginny; and Kate and Jack agree to attend couples therapy.
7	7	"Ski Trip"	Lang Fisher	Lisa Muse Bryant	May 1, 2025
In the winter, the group's annual New Year's Eve ski vacation includes Anne's new boyfriend, Terry, while Nick struggles to connect with Ginny's friends on a separate trip. Apologizing to Danny, Kate reveals she and Jack have grown distant. Nick wishes his friends well over the phone, but after Ginny confronts him for avoiding her friends, he makes a thoughtful trip to buy groceries. Suspecting he once slept with Terry, Claude leads everyone to the hot tub to confirm if he has a birthmark, which Terry does not have. Kate accuses Jack of cheating, leading to a fight. Drying her phone after dropping it in the hot tub, Kate realizes Ginny has been trying to reach her, and Nick has died in a car accident. Walking in on Anne receiving oral sex from Terry, Kate and Jack break the news, and the friends all grieve together.
8	8	"Fun"	Lang Fisher	Lang Fisher & Tracey Wigfield	May 1, 2025
The group gathers at the lake house to plan Nick's funeral. Ginny is shut out, but Jack suggests she speak at the service, despite everyone's objections. When Jack fails to negotiate a less expensive funeral package, Kate takes over, resulting in a disappointing service with an urn shaped like a high-heeled shoe. Kate is forced to tell Ginny she will not be speaking, but Anne's complicated feelings about Nick leave her unable to deliver her eulogy. Afterward, Ginny confronts the group and storms off, and the group sets out to find her when she didn't return. Danny struggles to come to terms with Nick's death, and Jack rescues Kate when they accidentally walked on the frozen lake. Moved by Ginny's joyful photos with Nick, Anne finds her and apologizes, assuring Ginny that Nick was truly happy with her. Agreeing to work on their marriage, Kate declares Jack her soulmate, and Danny embraces Claude's outlook on life. Deciding to plan a trip in Nick's honor, the group drinks a toast to his memory, and Anne announces that Ginny is pregnant.

=== Season 2 (2026) ===
No. overall	No. in season	Title	Directed by	Written by	Original release date
9	1	"Hiking"	Colman Domingo	Vali Chandrasekaran	May 28, 2026
In the spring, a very pregnant Ginny joins Anne, Kate, Jack, Danny and Claude upstate as they meet to spread Nick's ashes on a mountain that was special to him. While Jack is happy to meet up, unbeknownst to him, Anne and Ginny are having legal problems due to Nick and Anne's divorce not being finalized before his death. During a dinner, Claude and Danny spark a fight over children since Danny claims that Claude didn't want kids as Ginny reveals she is having a boy. The next morning the group trudge up the mountain again. Once reaching the top, they realize that Danny left the ashes back at the motel, the group leaves the mountain and back to their motel. Many secrets are revealed: Jack learns of Anne and Ginny's issues causing Claude to be upset since his sister is a single parent. As they plan to leave, cops arrive and tell them that they can't leave due to a gunman.
10	2	"Funky Motel"	Tina Fey	Lisa Muse Bryant	May 28, 2026
They are forced inside the motel lobby where there are no staff. More secrets come to light: Anne reveals that she traded the boat for 2 donkeys due to feeling overwhelmed. Danny reveals to Jack that Kate has been lying about training for the marathon. When feeling hungry, they try to find food, of which there is none, so Jack heads to the snack shack outside. He finds that every cabinet is locked, annoying him. As they eat nachos, Ginny grows upset due to baby stories from Claude, Anne, and Kate. After the gunman is caught, Anne approaches Ginny to check on her. Danny approaches Claude about the idea of them having kids. The next morning as the group goes to leave, they decide to head back up the mountain to scatter Nick. While there, Anne reveals that Ginny is moving in with her and Claude and Danny are going to have a baby.
11	3	"Down the Shore"	Jeff Richmond	Matt Whitaker	May 28, 2026
In the summer, Anne, Jack, Danny, Claude, Ginny and Kate head to Jenkinson's beach with Ginny's son, Eugene. While on the beach, Claude decides to start calling the baby Gino, which sticks. Kate reveals to Danny that Jack misses having a guy friend like Nick. During a meal, Danny and Claude reveal that the adoption agency denied them so they are going for surrogacy. Anne claims that dating "bullshit" is behind her while focusing on Ginny and the baby. Kate is excited to see Jack make a beach friend, Mark Brett. That evening Kate, Danny and Claude watch as Anne helps to fix Ginny's breast pump in a way that causes the others to ask after Anne. Upon learning that Kate and Jack's room had blackout curtains, they switch rooms with Anne and Ginny due to the baby. The next day Jack decides to spend his time with Mark again. When Ginny decided to stay in, Danny reveals that he doesn't know much about babies. Across the way, Jack and Mark are bonding over loss and when Jack asks to invite him to dinner, the others decide to seat him next to Anne and that Claude would stay with the baby. Danny later returns to watch the baby, sending Ginny and Claude out for ice cream. The baby wakes not long after so Danny awkwardly goes to check in on him. Unfortunately Gino starts to cry to Danny tries everything to calm him down. Anne spends some time with Mark and he reveals that he thinks Jack and Kate are swingers, much to her amusement. Late at night, Anne returns to Mark for a one night stand.
12	4	"On the Boardwalk"	Tracey Wigfield	Tracey Wigfield	May 28, 2026
Upon waking from her one night stand, Anne returns to find Ginny isn't feeling as tired with the baby. Anne reveals to Ginny about her one night stand. Kate grows upset about vacation soon coming to an end, but Jack realizes that it was due to his attitude. Mark shows up briefly causing Claude and Danny to realize Anne slept with Mark. Claude expresses fears of having a baby with Danny. While out on a bike ride with Kate, Danny comes across a house for sale. Danny and Kate go inside while discussing Claude and his fears. When Ginny thinks of taking Gino into the ocean, Anne talks her out of it. Upon learning that Jack had been vaping every night of the summer, Kate decides to try it for herself. While under the influence, she reveals that she is always miserable. Anne and Mark decide that since they are never going to see each other again, to not care how they act and have a fun night. After Danny goes ahead with the surrogacy, Claude grows upset that Danny ignored his feelings and they fight while riding the Tilt-a-Whirl with a high Kate. Anne and Mark go to say goodbye and he asks for her number since they had fun, to which she immediately says no despite later regretting not giving him her number. The next morning as they are packing up, Jack declares that he will stop vaping as Kate is hungover. Danny and Claude spent the night on the beach listening to Kate's therapist's book and decide to not have a baby. After hearing Anne correct her again, Ginny takes Gino to the ocean and allows him to get his feet wet.
13	5	"Big Thanksgiving"	Robert Pulcini & Shari Springer Berman	Josh Siegal & Dylan Morgan	May 28, 2026
In the fall, Anne is hosting an orphans Thanksgiving while Kate and her daughter, Claude and Danny, Ginny and Jack meet up. Jack is wearing the t-shirt he had made to remember Nick. Anne reveals to Kate that Ginny and the baby are moving out. Jack is upset to see Terry and his new girlfriend as he wanted to do all the Nick related things. Jack and Kate have a fight over her upcoming business plan. Lila reveals to Anne that she doesn't want to come home for Christmas. When Gino begins screeching, Anne goes to help Ginny calm him down. When Jack puts up a curtain for a talent show, he is upset when no one wants to participate. When Kate decides to try talking to Danny about the B&B, Danny reveals that he and Claude are moving to Italy. Kate upsets Danny further. When Jack asks Kate about it, she grows annoyed with him asking about it. Danny approaches Kate to tell her that he is leaving in two weeks, keeping her upset. Anne overhears Ginny talking to Lila about staying for the holidays, causing her to later kick Ginny out. After Jack brings out the turkey, he learns that he there are no seats. Upon finding Kate sobbing, Jack yells at Danny and steals the turkey and kicks it. He then falls down the steps outside, ending his hope for the marathon. After the dinner many leave, including Claude and Danny. Jack ices his ankle with peas when Kate approaches and they make up. After everyone leaves, Anne goes up the stairs and remembers Nick as he exits the bathroom during COVID.
14	6	"Little Thanksgiving"	Robert Pulcini & Shari Springer Berman	Tina Fey	May 28, 2026
In a flashback episode, Nick and Anne are excited to see Claude and Danny who are the first to arrive with Patrizia, a dog. The next to arrive are Jack, Kate, and Beth. The meal has everyone eating outside and sitting six feet apart. Anne reveals that she and Lila made a trophy for a talent show. Jack is nervous due to COVID while everyone else feels fine since they followed all the guidelines. Morning arrives and Jack reads a poem to Kate, who just wants to join the others. Claude is upset because their dog isn't eating. Later they get family on Zoom as they perform the talent show. All throughout the night, Nick is getting texts from a younger woman. At the end of the night, everyone falls asleep together. Kate is not feeling well so she home tests and Jack freaks out due to possible breaking of quarantine. When the dog runs away, Danny goes after her and comes across the woman who was texting Nick and he takes the pie from her and tells her that his family has COVID. Nick reveals that lockdown "saved him" from cheating on his wife further than the kiss he had before the lockdown. Danny home tests and learns that he too is sick so he joins Kate in the sick room. Claude asks Nick to take him to the dog rescue since the dog hates him, and then lies to Danny about the dog running away. The next to home test is Jack after his daughter reminds him that he had been out. Anne then tests and worries about Nick cheating so she snoops through his phone. After Danny heads out to look for her, he learns that Patrizia had been given away. Jack then learns that he got everyone sick and has a fight with Nick over the man inviting everyone. Jack reveals that he is scared as Nick reveals that he wishes he was like Jack. Danny and Claude discuss the dog and them not having kids. Claude then rushed off. That night all the adults complain about not being able to taste the food properly. Nick tosses the pie in the trash, surprising Anne, and Nick reveals his truth to Anne about kissing the woman. Anne reveals that she knows that he will cheat again and she declares that she is done before storming off. While outside, Anne begins to cry before heading back inside the home. In the present, Anne declares that she can't be there for Christmas as she looks upon the empty room full of memories.
15	7	"Trento"	Lang Fisher	John Riggi	May 28, 2026
In the winter, Kate, Jack, and Anne head to Italy to visit Claude, Danny, and Claude's family. Jack immediately apologizes for Thanksgiving. Anne is compared to an Italian Christmas witch, Befana. Danny and Kate go to the wrong church after both being robbed. Jack freaks out during football with Claude and local guys. Later Claude takes Jack out for a drink and they discuss his anger issues. When Kate needs a restroom, Danny helps her break into a public one, as Claude and Jack drink together. Danny admits that he shouldn't have moved, much to a surprised Kate. Jack and Claude meet up with Anne who admits that she is more like the Italian witch than she would like. Kate says that she and Danny will always be like them. At the church, the show is already going on when Danny and Kate show up. Anne then walks out dressed as the Italian woman, surprising her friends. Later that night, Danny sparks a fight with Claude about him staying in Italy moments before his phone rings with a call from his mother.
16	8	"Maratona"	Lang Fisher	Lang Fisher	May 28, 2026
Danny leaves Italy to head to Philadelphia due to his mom being in the hospital. Anne declares that they should do a quick Christmas so she rushes to get Danny's gift as she was his secret santa. Kate and Jack pick a carol to sing which Anne joins as Danny leaves. Jack, Claude, Kate, and Anne head to sight-see which is interrupted by Claude taking off to help his mom. When Jack suggests doing something not religious as Anne tells them that she wanted to reinvent herself. When Danny calls Claude, he admits that he wouldn't be able to get back as quickly due to his mom's injury and how his aunt looked. Kate and Jack are out to dinner and Jack admits to being a failure. Claude's mother tells him that he should go if he feels he should. Anne decides to call Mark after realizing that the duck she gave Gino had Mark's number. Mark admits to having a girlfriend, surprising Anne, who proceeds to lie about her life. On their way back to Claude's, Jack and Kate learn of a marathon the next day, causing Kate to talk him into doing it while using Claude's clothes. Anne proceeds to take random photos to send to Mark. Kate helps Jack cross the finish line. Mark then calls her to tell her to stop texting him because she accidentally sent him a photo of her vagina. When Danny tries to talk his mother into coming to Italy to live, Claude grows upset as Danny yells at him. Ginny calls Anne to gush over the photos and that she should live for herself. As Danny begs his mother to come to Italy, Claude comes up with a solution: Danny and him would move in with Danny's mother to take care of her. Anne decides that she would house-sit for Danny and Claude. When Jack and Kate leave, Danny and Claude's neighbor (David Tennant) comes over to talk to Anne.

== Release ==
The series premiered on Netflix on May 1, 2025. The second season premiered on May 28, 2026.

== Reception ==
=== Critical response ===
Critical response of The Four Seasons
Season	Rotten Tomatoes	Metacritic
1	78% (80 reviews)	61 (32 reviews)
2	89% (35 reviews)	75 (15 reviews)

The series received generally favorable reviews from critics. For the first season, it holds a 78% approval rating on the review aggregator website Rotten Tomatoes, based on 80 critic reviews, with an average rating of 6.5/10. The website's critics consensus reads: "Welcoming as a lakeside vista and occasionally just as placid, The Four Seasons isn't as breezily funny as creator Tina Fey's best work but often just as witty and wise." Metacritic, which uses a weighted average, assigned a score of 61 out of 100, based on 32 critics, indicating "generally favorable" reviews.

Saloni Gajjar of The A.V. Club gave the series a B+ and wrote, "Despite the aforementioned lack of jokes, the show is never too intense, with the eight half-hour installments flowing by breezily. The characters are entertaining and worth spending time with, and the miniseries boasts well-written banter, immersive settings, and, best of all, Antonio Vivaldi's eponymous violin concertos acting as a comforting companion throughout this journey." Reviewing the series for The Guardian, Lucy Mangan gave a rating of 4/5 and wrote, "The Four Seasons is Fey and her writing and acting ensembles on fine form, everything informed by her rigorous intelligence, wit and experience. Rest your aching bones and enjoy." Alan Sepinwall of Rolling Stone commented, "There are some amusing moments, and a few genuinely poignant ones, but on the whole it feels thin—less a TV show than an excuse for a bunch of talented people, several of them old friends IRL, to hang out together in a variety of pretty locales."

The second season holds a 89% approval rating on Rotten Tomatoes, based on 35 reviews, with an average rating of 7.3/10. The website's critics consensus reads: "Finding renewed purpose after a major loss, The Four Seasons balances laughter and heartbreak with the confidence of a show settling comfortably into its own rhythm." Metacritic, which uses a weighted average, assigned a score of 75 out of 100, based on 15 critics, indicating "generally favorable" reviews.

=== Awards and nominations ===
Year	Award	Category	Recipient(s)	Result	Ref.
2025	Black Reel TV Awards	Outstanding Supporting Performance in a Comedy Series	Colman Domingo	Nominated	
2025	Black Reel TV Awards	Outstanding Directing in a Comedy Series	Colman Domingo (for "Ultimate Frisbee")	Nominated	
2025	Dorian TV Awards	Best Supporting TV Performance – Comedy	Colman Domingo	Nominated	
2025	Primetime Emmy Awards	Outstanding Supporting Actor in a Comedy Series	Colman Domingo (for "Eco Resort")	Nominated	
2025	SeriesFest	Breakthrough Actor Award	Marco Calvani	Honored	
2025	Set Decorators Society of America TV Awards	Best Achievement in Décor/Design of a Television Movie or Limited Series	Jennifer Greenberg and Sharon Lomofsky	Nominated	
2026	GLAAD Media Awards	Outstanding New TV Series	The Four Seasons	Nominated	
2026	NAACP Image Awards	Outstanding Supporting Actor in a Comedy Series	Colman Domingo	Nominated	
2026	NAACP Image Awards	Outstanding Directing in a Comedy Series	Colman Domingo (for "Ultimate Frisbee")	Nominated	
2026	Queerties Awards	Best TV Comedy	The Four Seasons	Nominated	
2026	Queerties Awards	Best TV Performance	Colman Domingo	Nominated	
2026	Dorian TV Awards	Best Unsung TV Show	The Four Seasons	Pending	
2026	Dorian TV Awards	Best Supporting TV Performance – Comedy	Colman Domingo	Pending	
2026	Black Reel TV Awards	Outstanding Supporting Performance in a Comedy Series	Colman Domingo	Pending	
2026	Black Reel TV Awards	Outstanding Directing in a Comedy Series	Colman Domingo (for "Hiking")	Pending	
2026	Primetime Emmy Awards	Outstanding Supporting Actor in a Comedy Series	Colman Domingo	Nominated	

=== Viewership ===
According to data from Showlabs, The Four Seasons ranked second on Netflix in the United States during the week of April 28–May 4, 2025.
