= Little Stranger (company) =

Film and television production company founded by Tina Fey

Little Stranger, Inc.
- Type: Private
- Industry: Film production; Television production
- Founded: January 5, 2001; 25 years ago in New York City, United States
- Founder: Tina Fey
- Headquarters: New York City; Los Angeles, California
- Key people: Tina Fey (CEO and CFO); Eric Gurian (President of Production and Development)

Little Stranger, Inc. is a film and television production company founded by actress and producer Tina Fey.

The company is known for producing television series, such as 30 Rock for NBC, and Unbreakable Kimmy Schmidt for Netflix, as well as shows like Mr. Mayor, Girls5eva, and most recently, The Four Seasons and The Fall and Rise of Reggie Dinkins.

The company's name is a rough translation of Xenakes, Fey's mother's maiden name.

== Production ==
In February 2016, Little Stranger signed with Universal Pictures on a two-year first-look production deal.

== Filmography ==
=== Television ===
Title	Year	Network	Notes	Ref.
30 Rock	2006–2013	NBC	with Broadway Video and Universal Television	
Unbreakable Kimmy Schmidt	2015–2019	Netflix	with Bevel Gears, 3 Arts Entertainment, and Universal Television	
Great News	2017–2018	NBC	with Bevel Gears, Big Wig Productions, 3 Arts Entertainment, and Universal Television	
Busy Tonight	2018–2019	E!	with Busy Bee Productions and Wilshire Studios	
Mr. Mayor	2021–2022	NBC	with Bevel Gears, 3 Arts Entertainment, and Universal Television	
Girls5eva	2021–2024	Peacock; Netflix	with Bevel Gears, Scardino and Sons, 3 Arts Entertainment, and Universal Television	
Mulligan	2023–2024	Netflix	with Bevel Gears, Means End Productions, Bento Box Entertainment, 3 Arts Entertainment, and Universal Television	
The Four Seasons	2025–present	Netflix	with Original Langster, Big Wig Productions, and Universal Television	
The Fall and Rise of Reggie Dinkins	2026–present	NBC	with Bevel Gears, 3 Arts Entertainment, and Universal Television	

=== Film ===
Year	Title	Director	Gross (worldwide)	Notes	Ref.
2015	Sisters	Jason Moore	$105 million	with Everyman Pictures	
2016	Whiskey Tango Foxtrot	Glenn Ficarra; John Requa	$25.4 million	with Broadway Video	
2024	Mean Girls	Samantha Jayne; Arturo Perez Jr.	$104.4 million	with Broadway Video	
