= The Fall and Rise of Reggie Dinkins =

2026 American comedy television series

- Genre: Sitcom; Sports; Mockumentary
- Created by: Robert Carlock & Sam Means
- Starring: Tracy Morgan; Erika Alexander; Precious Way; Jalyn Hall; Bobby Moynihan; Daniel Radcliffe
- Theme music composer: Jack Grabow
- Country of origin: United States
- Original language: English
- No. of seasons: 2
- No. of episodes: 13

Production
- Executive producers: Robert Carlock; Sam Means; Tina Fey; David Miner; Tracy Morgan; Eric Gurian; Rhys Thomas
- Producers: Jerry Kupfer; Margo Myers
- Cinematography: Charlie Gruet
- Editors: Kyle Gilman; Nathan Floody; Laura Weinberg; Anthony Muzzatti
- Camera setup: Single-camera
- Production companies: Little Stranger; 3 Arts Entertainment; Bevel Gears; Means End Productions; Streetlife Productions, Inc.; Universal Television

Original release
- Network: NBC
- Release: January 18, 2026 – present

The Fall and Rise of Reggie Dinkins is an American sports mockumentary sitcom created by Robert Carlock and Sam Means for NBC. The series premiered as a midseason entry in the 2025–26 television season on January 18, 2026. In May 2026, the series was renewed for a second season which premiered on November 2, 2026.

== Cast and characters ==
=== Main ===
- Tracy Morgan as Reggie Dinkins, an ex-football player who is trying to make a comeback
- Erika Alexander as Monica, Reggie's ex-wife who is also his business manager and agent
- Precious Way as Brina, Reggie's fiancée
- Jalyn Hall as Carmelo, Reggie and Monica's teenage son
- Bobby Moynihan as Rusty, Reggie's former teammate and best friend
- Daniel Radcliffe as Arthur Tobin, a director hired by Reggie to film his documentary

=== Guest/supporting ===
- Megan Thee Stallion as Denise, a divorced mom and mail-carrier who flirts with Arthur
- Corbin Bernsen as Duck Donovan, Reggie's former coach whose life collapsed after Reggie's scandal came out
- Craig Robinson as Jerry Basmati, Reggie's rival
- Heidi Gardner as Tisha Basmati, Jerry's wife
- Anna Camp as Narcissa Ocean, Arthur's toxic ex
- Ronny Chieng as Barry Hu, a rival agent to Monica
- Drew Scheid as Shane E. Quinn III, former assistant to Monica
- Chloe Troast as Jynnysyz, Brina's rival in the music industry

== Series overview ==
Season	Episodes	Originally released	
Season	Episodes	First released	Last released
1	10	January 18, 2026	April 13, 2026
2	10	November 2, 2026	TBA

== Episodes ==
=== Season 1 (2026) ===
No. overall	No. in season	Title	Directed by	Written by	Original release date
1	1	"Pilot"	Rhys Thomas	Robert Carlock & Sam Means	January 18, 2026
Former star football player, Reggie Dinkins was disgraced and has banned from the sport after a gambling scandal. He lives with his son, Carmelo, fiancée Brina, and his former teammate Rusty. His manager is ex-wife, Monica. Reggie hires filmmaker Arthur Tobin to produce a documentary about him. Monica is resistant, concerned Arthur will make an embarrassing film about Reggie. When Arthur is unable to secure the rights to use NFL game footage, Reggie fires him, while Monica quits as Reggie's agent. Monica meets with a talent agency and learns about Arthur's embarrassing past when he was producing a Marvel film. Monica decides to work with Reggie, and they convince Arthur to stay and make the documentary.
2	2	"Nittany Means Big"	Beth McCarthy-Miller	Phil Augusta Jackson	February 23, 2026
Arthur attempts to learn more about one of Reggie's most famous games during his college career against Penn State when he had an impressive game but then threw up in his helmet on television. Reggie had long claimed that it was from food poisoning, but Arthur discovered in old newspapers that it was the result of swallowing river water while attempting to kidnap the mascot during a prank gone wrong the night before the game. Monica reveals that she had long hidden this fact, because she felt that it would ruin Reggie's reputation, and Arthur agrees to continue keeping this secret.
3	3	"Put It on Your Cabbage!"	Maurice Marable	Meredith Scardino & Evan Susser	March 2, 2026
Arthur learns that Reggie avoids most public appearances, even going to Carmelo's football games, out of fear of being recognized. Arthur tries to encourage Reggie to go out, only to be refused. Arthur tricks Reggie to go to a restaurant, where he is recognized. In exchange, Arthur attends a film festival despite his embarrassment over a viral clip of him when he was directing a movie that caused his to leave Hollywood. Monica tries to coach Brina, as she thinks that she is not financially responsible, but realizes that she is much more financially savvy than she initially appeared.
4	4	"Save the Cat"	Beth McCarthy-Miller	Grace Edwards	March 9, 2026
Reggie sees on the news that his former coach, Duck, has lost his favorite cat, Namath. Thinking that pleasing Duck will help him get into the hall of fame, Reggie tries to find Namath, along with the help of Arthur. Arthur is fired by the dean, but decides to continue his project. After seeing Rusty's success in dating, Monica decides to try online dating, but is disappointed by the man that she met.
5	5	"You May Hug Your Hero"	Reginald Hudlin	Robert Carlock & Sam Means	March 16, 2026
Reggie wants to confront his old on-field rival, Jerry Basmati, who is now in the hall of fame and has a successful newscasting career after football. Reggie and Jerry host rival football camps, which leads a game between the two teams. Monica and Jerry's wife, Tisha, are performatively nice to one another, but deeply resent each other. At the camp, Arthur meets Denise, a postal worker, and sneaks away to have sex with her. Jerry's team defeats Reggie's team, but Reggie gives a speech to his team that leads to a popular video of Jerry that wins him public appeal.
6	6	"Dr. Watson's Dad"	Heather Jack	Robert Carlock & Auguste White	March 23, 2026
Rutgers University decides to rename its stadium from Reggie Dinkins to Calista Flockhart. Monica sets up an interview with a New Jersey newspaper, but Reggie insists on wearing a mock-Hall of Fame jacket and a Jets hat, and appearing alongside a bust of his head, that the others find ugly. The bust is broken, causing Reggie to investigate using Arthur's footage. Arthur attempts to frame Brina, but comes clean, thinking he was the one that broke the bust. But ultimately, it was Carmelo who broke it while rehearsing a dance for TikTok.
7	7	"The World Is Full of Beaks"	Beth McCarthy-Miller	Mamoudou N'Diaye & Evan Susser	March 30, 2026
Arthur convinces Reggie that they need to shoot more footage in New York, but Reggie realizes that Arthur was trying to make an excuse to see Denise, the postal worker he met at the training camp. Arthur reveals that he is obsessed with Denise, and Reggie tries to convince Arthur that Denise does not reciprocate his feelings. Arthur reveals that he had previously been in a toxic relationship with a woman named Narcissa, and she was one of the reasons that he left Los Angeles. Brina gets into a public feud over video game royalties with another rapper, but later makes amends, but keeps up the conflict for publicity. Arthur is rejected by Denise and returns to Reggie's house, but is surprised to see that his ex-girlfriend Narcissa has found him in New Jersey and arrived.
8	8	"The Loyalty Swamp"	Don Scardino	Neda Jebelli & Bradley Gill Lewis	April 6, 2026
Continuing from the last episode, Arthur is openly hostile towards Narcissa and wants her to leave but Brina allows Narcissa to stay until she finishes her talk with Arthur. After Narcissa tells him that they're married, Arthur realizes that he married Narcissa in Las Vegas and got blackout drunk before he left Los Angeles. Narcissa reveals she's only here to get divorced from Arthur, understanding that they're not right for each other. Arthur signs some papers for Narcissa and she leaves, although afterward Arthur realizes he never checked if they were divorce papers. Meanwhile, Brina is mad at Reggie for not having picked a date for our wedding, so she claims she'll be going with her ex-boyfriend on a reality series called "Ex-Peninsula" in order to make her jealous. Reggie reveals he had been dragging his feet on choosing a date because he's worried newspapers will just refer to him as a disgraced football star, but Brina doesn't care about that. The two reconcile.
9	9	"Mischief and Memories"	Maggie Carey	Vivianne Nguyen & Meredith Scardino	April 13, 2026
The NFL is choosing a new member for the Hall of Fame selection committee, and Duck is chosen. Reggie and Monica convince Duck to nominate Reggie for the Hall of Fame. However, Jerry is still hating Reggie, sends Duck to a therapy clinic and takes the committee seat himself. Arthur, meanwhile, realizes that he has integrated himself into the Dinkins family far more than he should have instead of being an observer for the documentary. Carmelo is ok with this, as the cameras caught him sneaking out to a party. However, after Jerry calls Reggie a bad person, Arthur tries to provoke Jerry into nominating Reggie. A day later, Jerry reveals he nominated Rusty instead.
10	10	"A Real Cinderello Story"	Beth McCarthy-Miller	Robert Carlock & Sam Means	April 13, 2026
Rusty doesn't want to be in the Hall of Fame, and is aware that he doesn't deserve it, so he and Reggie try to lose public favor, only for it to continuously backfire. Reggie tries to be supportive of Rusty despite his obvious jealousy. However, he finds a role to disqualify himself by attacking Reggie with a helmet, saving his and Reggie's friendship. Meanwhile, Monica chokes while trying to present her agency for a client, but decides to stop hiding the fact that Reggie is her client. At the end of the episode, Carmelo is revealed to be secretly dating Jerry's daughter.

=== Season 2 (2026) ===
No. overall	No. in season	Title	Directed by	Written by	Original release date
11	1	"We Keep the Kisses"	Rhys Thomas	Robert Carlock & Sam Means	November 2, 2026
Monica continues her attempt to refresh Reggie's image by contacting media outlets, but feels that she needs younger assistant to understand modern trends, so she hires Max, a recent graduate. Carmelo attempts to blackmail Arthur to hide his relationship with Delilah, Jerry Basmati's daughter, and Arthur agrees, but is also happy that drama is being created for his documentary. Brina realizes that Carmelo is dating Delilah and angrily confronts him, while Arthur feigns surprise. Carmelo and Delilah realize that their relationship is forbidden, and appear to break up. Returning late to her office, Monica and Reggie find Max performing as an online fetish streamer, and he angrily complains that his generation can afford nothing, before being fired. Arthur sees that a stamp is missing, and deduces that Carmelo only appeared to break up with Delilah, but had sent her a letter to inform her that they need to keep their relationship a deeper secret.
12	2	"Spaghetti Loop"	Rhys Thomas	Phil Augusta Jackson	November 9, 2026
Arthur reaches out to his old mentor, a famed documentarian, who criticizes him for taking money from Reggie, and claims that his documentary cannot be taken seriously. Embarrassed, Arthur insists on returning all of the gifts he has received from Reggie, and that he must pay for his efforts, despite the fact that he has no money or steady income. Brina criticizes Rusty, and says that he is taking advantage of Reggie's money. Rusty tries to get a job, but is unable to find employment. Reggie becomes upset, because he feels that giving financial gifts to his friends is how he shows his appreciation of them. Monica comes up with a plan to fund Arthur by hiring him to direct a television episode. Brina realizes how much energy is required to entertain Reggie when Rusty is away, and begs Rusty to stop trying to find a job, which he agrees to. Arthur, financially stable again, moves back in and continues producing his documentary; its revealed that Reggie and Monica had plotted to create the television show as a means of paying Arthur.
13	3	"Hulk Want Candy"	Beth McCarthy-Miller	Dan Rubin & Auguste White	November 16, 2026
14	4	"Turkey Can Be This"	TBA	Grace Edwards	November 23, 2026
15	5	"Reggie Finally Kills Dracula"	TBA	Robert Carlock & Sam Means	December 7, 2026

== Production ==
In March 2025, an untitled single-camera comedy starring Tracy Morgan was given a pilot order at NBC with Morgan, Tina Fey, Robert Carlock, Sam Means, Eric Gurian, David Miner, and Rhys Thomas serving as the executive producers. The episode was written by Carlock and Means, with Thomas directing and Daniel Radcliffe, Erika Alexander, Bobby Moynihan, Precious Way, and Jalyn Hall joining Morgan as series-regular cast members. In May, NBC gave the project a ten-episode series order with the title The Fall and Rise of Reggie Dinkins.

On January 14, 2026, NBC announced that the series would premiere on January 18 following NBC's coverage of an NFL divisional playoff game, ahead of its originally-planned timeslot premiere on February 23, 2026.

On May 5, 2026, NBC renewed the series for a second season. The second season premiered on November 2, 2026.

== Reception ==
=== Critical response ===
On the review aggregator website Rotten Tomatoes, the first season holds an approval rating of 97% based on 39 reviews with an average rating of 7.7/10. The website's critics consensus reads, "Harnessing Tracy Morgan's unpredictable comedic charisma to consistently hilarious effect, The Fall and Rise of Reggie Dinkins is a delightful ensemble sitcom that, true to its title, gets better and better as it goes along." Metacritic, which uses a weighted average, gave a score of 76 out of 100 based on 16 critics, indicating "generally favorable" reviews.

=== Ratings ===
The series premiered with a special early showing on January 18, 2026, following an NFL divisional playoff game between the Los Angeles Rams and Chicago Bears. The pilot episode drew 5.8 million viewers and achieved a 1.4 rating in the 18-49 demographic. It became the most-watched comedy episode of the 2025–26 season among broadcast networks in both total viewers and the key demographic, and was NBC's most-watched comedy series debut in three years since Night Court premiered in January 2023.

== See also ==
- Mr. Throwback, a 2024 TV series with a similar premise and format
