= Erika Henningsen =

American actress (born 1992)

- Henningsen in 2026
- Born: Erika Leigh Henningsen; August 13, 1992 (age 34); Moraga, California, U.S.
- Education: University of Michigan (BFA)
- Occupations: Actress; singer
- Years active: 2007–present
- Spouse: Kyle Selig (m. 2023)

Erika Leigh Henningsen (born August 13, 1992) is an American actress and singer. She is best known for her work on Broadway and for originating the role of Cady Heron in the 2018 Tony-nominated musical Mean Girls, for which she received an Outer Critics Circle Award nomination. Since 2024, she has voiced Charlie Morningstar in the adult animated musical series Hazbin Hotel.

== Early life and education ==
Erika Leigh Henningsen was born on August 13, 1992, and raised in Moraga, California. She is the youngest of three daughters born to Phil and Marybeth Henningsen.

Henningsen started in theatre after her parents recognized her passion for "talking and being in front of people" from a young age. At the age of seven, her interest in theatre was piqued after she read the Jack Prelutsky poem "The Turkey Shot out of the Oven" and hearing the audience's positive response to her performance. When she was 14 years old, Henningsen was cast in a local production of Grey Gardens and has stated in interviews that after performing in this production, she knew she wanted to pursue musical theatre as a career.

Henningsen graduated from Campolindo High School in 2010, where she sang in the school's choir program alongside music producer Rob Bisel and musical artist Sven Gamsky (Still Woozy). She then studied at the University of Michigan, earning a BFA in musical theatre in 2014. During her undergraduate years, she also studied at the Royal Academy of Dramatic Art in London through the NYU London program. Henningsen was selected as the winner of the 2014 Alan Eisenberg Award Scholarship, an award given to a University of Michigan graduating senior in recognition of "outstanding talent and career potential" in musical theatre.

== Theatre ==
In November 2014, she made her New York Philharmonic debut as Kim Ravenal in a staged concert production of Kern and Hammerstein's Show Boat. A live taping of the production later aired on PBS on October 16, 2015.

Later that year, Henningsen starred as Beth in the musical Diner, based on Barry Levinson's 1982 film of the same name with music and lyrics by Sheryl Crow. The musical, directed and choreographed by Kathleen Marshall, made its world premiere with a sold-out run at the Signature Theatre in Washington, D.C., from December 9, 2014, to January 25, 2015. She remained part of the production and its extended run when it was staged by the Delaware Theatre Company in December 2015.

Henningsen made her Broadway debut as Fantine in the revival of Les Misérables on March 3, 2015. She has disclosed in interviews that she was about to file for unemployment when she learned she was cast as Fantine, which also happened to be the last role she played as an undergraduate at the University of Michigan, 11 months earlier. She is the youngest actress in Broadway history (to date) to portray the role of Fantine. She left the production along with fellow Les Misérables co-stars Ramin Karimloo and Samantha Hill on August 30, 2015, and was replaced by Memphis star Montego Glover.

In the summer of 2016, Henningsen portrayed Ensign Nellie Forbush, opposite Ben Davis, in the Pittsburgh Civic Light Opera's production of South Pacific.

In February 2017, she appeared in an Off-Broadway staged concert of Jerry Herman's musical Dear World as Nina with York Theatre, starring alongside Tyne Daly, Alison Fraser, and Ann Harada.

Henningsen returned to the Pittsburgh Civic Light Opera (PCLO) in the summer of 2017, starring as Sophie in the company's regional production of Mamma Mia!. During her run at PCLO, it was announced that she was cast as Cady Heron in the upcoming Washington, D.C., production of Mean Girls.

Beginning in 2017, Henningsen starred as Cady Heron in the Tony Award-nominated Broadway musical Mean Girls, written by Tina Fey with music and lyrics by Jeff Richmond and Nell Benjamin, respectively. The show had its world premiere as an out-of-town tryout at the National Theatre in Washington, D.C., from October 31, 2017, to December 3, 2017, in which Henningsen originated the role of Cady Heron. She was later nominated for an Outer Critics Circle Award for this role. The musical, which is based on the film of the same name, began previews on March 12, 2018, and officially opened on Broadway on April 8, 2018, at the August Wilson Theatre in New York City. During the weeks surrounding the Broadway opening of Mean Girls, Henningsen filmed a series of video blogs for Broadway.com entitled "Too Grool for School: Backstage at Mean Girls with Erika Henningsen", giving viewers a look backstage and at events like opening night, the cast album recording, and the cast's appearance on The Today Show. Henningsen left the production on February 22, 2020, and was replaced by actress Sabrina Carpenter.

In March 2019, she portrayed Helen, opposite Mean Girls co-star Kyle Selig, in Stephen Sondheim's Saturday Night at Second Stage Theater as a part of the theater's "Musical Mondays" weekly concert series.

In April 2025, she debuted as Sandra Dee in Just in Time at Broadway's Circle in the Square Theatre alongside Jonathan Groff and Gracie Lawrence.

== Television ==
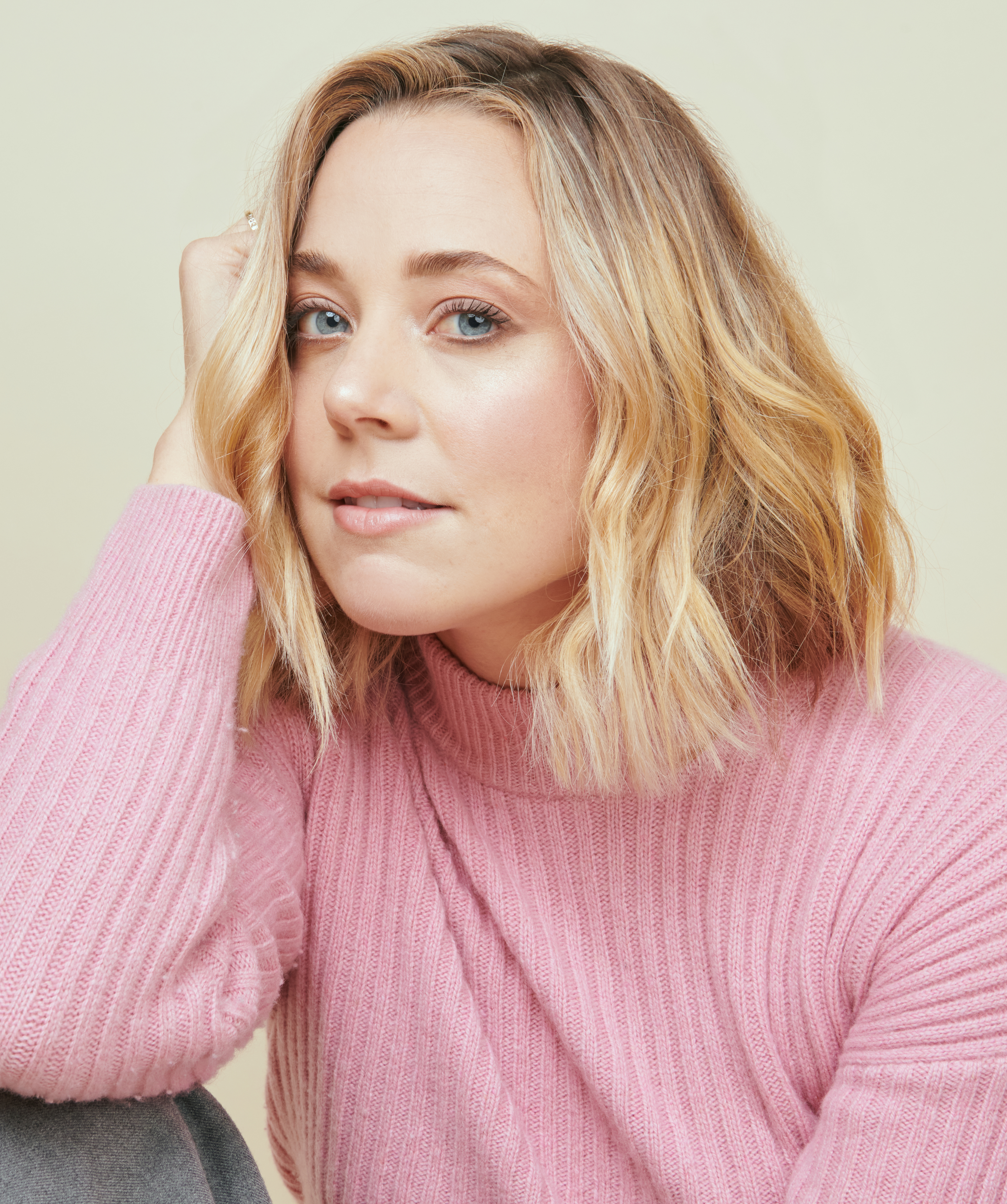
Henningsen in 2021

In January 2020, it was announced that Henningsen would be joining the Broadway cast of the new musical Flying Over Sunset, scheduled to open in the spring of 2020 at the Vivian Beaumont Theater under the direction of James Lapine. However, the production's opening was postponed until the fall of 2020 after theaters were mandated to shut down by Governor Andrew Cuomo on March 12, 2020, due to the COVID-19 pandemic. Henningsen did not return to the production when it resumed performances in December 2021.

From 2021 to 2024, Henningsen portrayed young Gloria in the Peacock comedy Girls5Eva, executive produced by Tina Fey and starring Sara Bareilles, Renée Elise Goldsberry, Busy Philipps, and Paula Pell.

In 2023, she was cast as a series regular in the ABC network pilot Public Defenders directed by Randall Einhorn, written/executive produced by Eddie Quintana and starring Anthony Anderson. However, the project was ultimately canceled due to the 2023 Writers Guild of America (WGA) strike.

She reunited with Mean Girls the Musical and Girls5Eva producer Tina Fey for the 2025 Netflix comedy The Four Seasons, playing the role of Ginny. Henningsen returned for season two of The Four Seasons, which premiered on May 28, 2026.

== Animation ==
In 2024, Henningsen began voicing the lead character, Charlie Morningstar, in Hazbin Hotel, created by Vivienne Medrano, an animated series from A24 and Bento Box Entertainment. She has also guest starred in its sister show, Helluva Boss, also created by Medrano.

== Philanthropy and social activism ==
As a student at the University of Michigan, Henningsen was the co-president of the Michigan Performance Outreach Workshop (MPOW), a student-run organization (co-founded by her classmate and future Mean Girls co-star, Ashley Park) with the purpose of bringing performing-arts educational opportunities to students in southeastern Michigan to, "foster creative expression, build self-esteem, and strengthen the community." MPOW hosts an on-campus workshop each semester for 130-200 public-school students that includes performances by University of Michigan students as well as immersive and collaborative workshops in other arts-based disciplines.

Henningsen has actively been involved with Sing For Hope, a NYC-based non-profit organization dedicated to creating access to high-quality arts education and programming throughout New York City. She serves as an artist partner, teaches classes, and leads workshops with purpose of introducing and encouraging creative expression in NYC children with decreased access to the arts.

Henningsen has also participated in events supporting Artists Striving to End Poverty (ASTEP), Artists For Action NYC, Broadway Sings for Immigration Equality, and Broadway Cares/Equity Fights AIDS (BCEFA). In July 2018, she attended the 20th Broadway Barks, an annual event promoting the adoption of shelter animals. In December 2018, Henningsen participated in the second annual Broadway Beats Hunger concert, raising funds for the Summit Medical Group Foundation's "Food, Health and Hope: An Answer to Diabetes" initiative. She was a prominent advocate for the Actors' Equity Association's "Not a Lab Rat" campaign, petitioning for actors participating in developmental labs for new stage productions to have a higher minimum salary and also receive a share of the production's profits.

In April 2019, Henningsen partnered with the African Library Project to create a library for St. Catherine's School in Migori County, Kenya, a few hours away from where Cady Heron (her fictional character from Mean Girls) lived. She raised money to pay for shipping costs and collected new and used books donated at the stage door of the August Wilson Theatre. In just over a month, Henningsen received over 1,100 donated books and shipped the "library" to Migori County, Kenya.

She also has served as a mentor and held masterclasses for various programs and organizations, such as The Performing Arts Project, Broadway Method Academy, Broadway Workshop, Exit II Theater, and The Broadway Collective.

During the COVID-19 pandemic, Henningsen teamed up with She's the First, a non-profit organization committed to providing access to education to all girls, to raise money for their COVID-19 Response Fund by offering access to her exclusive living room concert with any donation amount on May 12, 2020. Her Zoom living room concert on May 15, 2020, raised over $4,000 for She's the First.

== Personal life ==
Henningsen began dating Mean Girls costar Kyle Selig in 2018. The two announced their engagement on July 1, 2021. Henningsen married Selig on May 22, 2023, in New York City.

== Theatre credits ==
Credits in bold indicate Broadway production(s):

Year	Title	Role	Theatre	Director(s)	Ref.
2007	Into the Woods	Little Red Riding Hood	California Theatre Arts	Dyan McBride	
2010	Hairspray	Penny Pingleton	Woodminster Amphitheater	Joel Schlader	
2012	Carousel	Carrie Pipperidge	Wagon Wheel Theatre	Tony Humrichouser	
2012	Chicago	Roxie Hart	Wagon Wheel Theatre	Scott Michaels	
2012	Sunday in the Park with George	Celeste #1 / Waitress	University of Michigan	Mark Madama	
2013	Les Misérables	Cosette	Encore Theater	Dan Cooney	
2014	Les Misérables	Fantine	University of Michigan	Joe Locarro	
2014	Show Boat	Kim Ravenal	David Geffen Hall at Lincoln Center for the Performing Arts	Ted Sperling	
2014–15	Diner	Beth	Signature Theatre	Kathleen Marshall	
2015	**Les Misérables**	**Fantine** (replacement)	**Imperial Theatre**	Laurence Connor and James Powell	
2015–16	Diner	Beth	Delaware Theatre Company	Kathleen Marshall	
2016	South Pacific	Ensign Nellie Forbush	Pittsburgh Civic Light Opera	Linda Goodrich	
2016	FOUND	Becka	Philadelphia Theatre Company	Lee Overtree	
2017	Dear World	Nina	York Theatre	Michael Montel	
2017	Mamma Mia!	Sophie	Benedum Center	Barry Ivan	
2017	**Mean Girls**	**Cady Heron**	National Theatre (out-of-town tryout)	Casey Nicholaw	
2018–20	**Mean Girls**	**Cady Heron**	**August Wilson Theatre**	Casey Nicholaw	
2019	Saturday Night	Helen	Tony Kiser Theatre	Noah Brody	
2022	Joy	Joy Mangano	George Street Playhouse	Casey Hushion	
2023	Ever After The Musical	Danielle de Barbarac	Ordway Center for the Performing Arts	Marlo Hunter	
2025	**Just in Time**	**Sandra Dee**	**Circle in the Square Theatre**	Alex Timbers	
2025	Hello, Dolly!	Irene Molloy	Carnegie Hall	Jack Cummings III	
2026	Jane Eyre	Jane Eyre	David Geffen Hall	Tony Yazbeck	

== Filmography ==
=== Film ===
Year	Title	Role	Ref.
2013	Interface	Sarah	
2014	Bad Girls	Christine Babkin	
2015	Wide Awake	Kennedy	

=== Television ===
Year	Title	Role	Notes	Ref.
2015	Live from Lincoln Center: Kern & Hammerstein's Show Boat	Kim Ravenal	—	
2018	Saturday Night Live	Herself (uncredited)	Episode: "Tina Fey"	
2018	The Today Show	Cady Heron	Episode: "May 3, 2018"	
2018	Late Night with Seth Meyers	Cady Heron	Episode: "October 1, 2018"	
2021	Harlem	Kate	2 episodes	
2021–2024	Girls5eva	Young Gloria	Recurring role, 11 episodes	
2022	Blue Bloods	Madeline Gleeson	Episode: "The Reagan Way"	
2022	That Damn Michael Che	White Shopper	Episode: "Black Mediocrity"	
2023	Fright Krewe	Miss Alvina	Voice, episode: "The Haunting"	
2023	Curses!	Ania	Voice, 2 episodes	
2024–present	Hazbin Hotel	Charlie Morningstar	Voice, main role	
2024	FBI: International	Beatrice Cormack	Episode: "The Last Stop"	
2024	Helluva Boss	Bethany Ghostfucker	Voice, episode: "Ghostf**kers"	
2025–present	The Four Seasons	Ginny	Main role	

== Discography ==
=== Cast recordings and soundtracks ===
- The Theory of Relativity – Original Cast Recording (2016)
- Mean Girls – Original Broadway Cast Recording (2018)
- Girls5eva (Music From the Peacock Original Series) (2021)
- The Violet Hour (Studio Cast Recording) (2022)
- Hazbin Hotel (Original Soundtrack) (2024)
- Hazbin Hotel: Season Two (Original Soundtrack) (2025)

=== Collaborative projects ===
- Broadway's Carols for a Cure, Volume 17 (2015)
- Broadway's Carols for a Cure, Volume 20 (2018)

=== As featured artist ===
- "Rockin' Around the Pole" by The Hot Elves (2018)
- "Happy Day in Hell" (2023)

=== Charted songs ===
List of charted songs, with year released, selected chart positions, and album name shown
Title	Year	Peak chart positions					Album
Title	Year	US Bub.	US Rock /Alt.	CAN	NZ Hot	UK	Album
"Hell's Greatest Dad" (with Andrew Underberg, Sam Haft, Jeremy Jordan, Amir Talai, and Kimiko Glenn)	2024	9	—	74	23	98	Hazbin Hotel Original Soundtrack (Pt. 2)
"More Than Anything" (with Andrew Underberg, Sam Haft, and Jeremy Jordan)	2024	—	31	—	38	—	Hazbin Hotel Original Soundtrack (Pt. 2)
"You Didn't Know" (with Andrew Underberg, Sam Haft, Shoba Narayan, Patina Miller, Jessica Vosk, and Stephanie Beatriz)	2024	25	—	—	24	—	Hazbin Hotel Original Soundtrack (Pt. 2)
"Clean It Up!" (with Kimiko Glenn)	2025	—	42	—	—	—	Hazbin Hotel: Season Two (Original Soundtrack)
"Easy" (with Stephanie Beatriz)	2025	—	—	—	13	—	Hazbin Hotel: Season Two (Original Soundtrack)
"When I Think About the Future" (with Stephanie Beatriz, Krystina Alabado, Keith David, Kevin Del Aguila, Kimiko Glenn, Shoba Narayan, Christian Borle, Amir Talai, Joel Perez, Lilli Cooper, Jeremy Jordan, Jessica Vosk, Patrick Stump, and Patina Miller)	2025	—	—	—	37	—	Hazbin Hotel: Season Two (Original Soundtrack)
"Hear My Hope" (with Shoba Narayan, Keith David, Kimiko Glenn, Stephanie Beatriz, Blake Roman, Kevin Del Aguila, Krystina Alabado, Jessica Vosk, Patrick Stump, Alex Brightman, Daphne Rubin-Vega, James Monroe Iglehart, Andrew Durand, Leslie Kritzer, Amir Talai, Alex Newell, Joel Perez, Lilli Cooper, and Christian Borle)	2025	—	—	—	20	—	Hazbin Hotel: Season Two (Original Soundtrack)

== Awards and nominations ==
Year	Award	Category	Nominated work	Result	Ref.
2018	Broadway.com Audience Awards	Favorite Breakthrough Performance (Female)	Mean Girls	Won	
2018	Outer Critics Circle Award	Outstanding Leading Actress in a Musical	Mean Girls	Nominated	
2025	Broadway.com Audience Awards	Favorite Featured Actress in a Musical	Just in Time	Nominated	
2026	Grammy Awards	Best Musical Theater Album	Just in Time	Nominated	
2026	Annie Awards	Outstanding Achievement for Voice Acting in an Animated Television/Broadcast Production	Hazbin Hotel episode "Hazbin Hotel: Behind Closed Doors"	Nominated	

=== Special honors and awards ===
- 2014 – Alan Eisenberg Award Scholarship
- 2018 – Broadway.com Star of the Year
