= Mulligan (TV series) =

American animated sitcom

- Genre: Animated sitcom Post-apocalyptic
- Created by: Robert Carlock; Sam Means
- Voices of: Nat Faxon; Chrissy Teigen; Tina Fey; Sam Richardson; Dana Carvey; Phil LaMarr; Ayo Edebiri
- Composers: Jeff Richmond; Giancarlo Vulcano
- Country of origin: United States
- Original language: English
- No. of seasons: 1 (2 parts)
- No. of episodes: 20

Production
- Executive producers: Tina Fey; Robert Carlock; Sam Means; David Miner; Eric Gurian; Scott Greenberg; Joel Kuwahara
- Producers: James Merrill; Donna Smith; Ayo Edebiri
- Running time: 25–29 minutes
- Production companies: Little Stranger; Bevel Gears; Means End Productions; 3 Arts Entertainment; Bento Box Entertainment; Universal Television

Original release
- Network: Netflix
- Release: May 12, 2023 – May 24, 2024

Mulligan is an American animated apocalyptic sitcom created by Sam Means and Robert Carlock for Netflix. It premiered on May 12, 2023. Part 2 was released on May 24, 2024.

In the series, an alien invasion destroyed much of humanity, but the aliens were defeated by the working class-hero Matty Mulligan. In the aftermath of the invasion, Mulligan becomes President of the entire human race and he has to lead reconstruction efforts. The regular supporting cast includes Mulligan's girlfriend, a female "super scientist", a historian who became the right-hand man of the president, a reactionary senator who serves as the self-appointed vice-president and aims to revive humanity's past, and a captive alien general who remains on Earth as a prisoner of war.

== Premise ==
After an alien invasion on Earth, what's left of humanity has the chance to start all over again. Survivors will need to work together to avoid repeating the same mistakes.

== Cast ==
=== Main ===
- Nat Faxon as Matty Mulligan, a working-class man who saved Earth from the aliens, and has become President of the human race.
- Chrissy Teigen as Lucy Suwan, Earth's de facto First Lady and in a romantic relationship with Matty.
- Tina Fey as Dr. Farrah Braun, a single mom and super scientist.
- Sam Richardson as Simon Prioleau, a historian and Matty's right-hand man.
- Dana Carvey as Senator Cartwright LaMarr, a person who appointed himself as Vice-President of Earth and wants to return everything to the way it was in the past.
- Phil LaMarr as Axatrax, a well-regarded alien general who is prisoner of the humans, and was formerly imprisoned in the bowling alley of the White House.

=== Recurring ===
- Daniel Radcliffe as King Jeremy Fitzhogg, a party-boy who is son of a Lord in England, and with the deaths of the British royal family, has declared himself a King.
- Kevin Michael Richardson as TOD-209, the Pentagon's military cyborg who tries to remember what he was like as a human.
- Ayo Edebiri as General Scarpaccio/Jayson Moody, an aimless teenager who wears a uniform of a Marine general, but heads the Joint Chiefs of Staff.
- Ronny Chieng as Johnny Zhao, a billionaire from Hong Kong who tries to make money important again, working with LaMarr to achieve this goal.
- Toks Olagundoye

=== Guest ===
- "Weird Al" Yankovic as himself
- Questlove as himself
- Andy Samberg as Prophet Dave
- Ted Danson as Brad Chadman
- Maria Thayer
- Rachel Dratch
- Will Arnett
- Kyle Selig
- Jeff Richmond
- Pepper Teigen
- Jack Grabow
- David Herman
- Grey Griffin
- Will Forte
- Kaitlin Olson
- Chelsea Peretti

== Episodes ==
Series overview
Season	Episodes		Originally released
1	20	10	May 12, 2023
1	20	10	May 24, 2024

=== Season 1 (2023–24) ===
No. overall	No. in season	Title	Directed by	Written by	Original release date	Prod. code
Part 1
1	1	"The Great Mulligan"	Casey Crowe & Eddie Rosas & David C. Smith	Robert Carlock & Sam Means	May 12, 2023	1BBMU01
2	2	"Morning in America"	Eddie Rosas	Sam Means	May 12, 2023	1BBMU02
3	3	"Grand Old Party"	David C. Smith	Dan Rubin	May 12, 2023	1BBMU03
4	4	"The Stamp Act"	Casey Crowe	Andy Blitz & Maria Thayer	May 12, 2023	1BBMU04
5	5	"The Stench"	Eddie Rosas	Robert Carlock & Sam Means	May 12, 2023	1BBMU05
6	6	"Opening Day"	David C. Smith	Ben Dougan	May 12, 2023	1BBMU06
7	7	"The Egg Hunt"	Eddie Rosas	Ayo Edebiri	May 12, 2023	1BBMU07
8	8	"Matty’s Treasure: Book of Seeds"	Casey Crowe	Dan Rubin	May 12, 2023	1BBMU08
9	9	"Not My President"	David C. Smith	Sam Means	May 12, 2023	1BBMU09
10	10	"The Love Choice"	Casey Crowe	Ben Dougan & Taryn Englehart	May 12, 2023	1BBMU10
Part 2
11	11	"A Rising Tide"	Eddie Rosas	Sam Means	May 24, 2024	1BBMU11
12	12	"Party Foul"	David C. Smith	Robert Carlock	May 24, 2024	1BBMU12
13	13	"The Great Depression"	Casey Crowe & Mike Morris	Ben Dougan	May 24, 2024	1BBMU13
14	14	"Sic Semper Mulligan"	Eddie Rosas	Sam Means & Sam Shanker	May 24, 2024	1BBMU14
15	15	"DC/AC"	David C. Smith	Dan Rubin	May 24, 2024	1BBMU15
16	16	"The Ballad of Sentient Meat"	Casey Crowe	Taryn Englehart & Carline Fox	May 24, 2024	1BBMU16
17	17	"Watergate Watergate"	Eddie Rosas	Andy Blitz & Maria Thayer	May 24, 2024	1BBMU17
18	18	"Dr. Johnny's Wonder Pill"	David C. Smith	Liz Rivera	May 24, 2024	1BBMU18
19	19	"Camp David"	Casey Crowe	John Mahone	May 24, 2024	1BBMU19
20	20	"A House Divided"	Eddie Rosas	Robert Carlock & Sam Means	May 24, 2024	1BBMU20

== Production ==
In January 2021, it was stated that the series would have 20 episodes and be released in 2021. Tina Fey, Robert Carlock, and Sam Means would be producers, while Ayo Edebiri would be a co-producer. Dan Rubin, executive producer of Unbreakable Kimmy Schmidt collaborated with Fey, Carlock, and Means, on the series. Eric Gurian, David Miner, Scott Greenberg, and Joel Kuwahara would also be executive producers.

In June 2021, Emmy Magazine described the series as likely premiering in 2022 and described it as a "novel medium" with a "far-out premise", with every episode having table reads on Zoom. However, it did not premiere in 2022. In April 2023, it was announced that the series would premiere on May 12, 2023, on Netflix. Part 2 premiered on May 24, 2024.

== Reception ==
On the review aggregator website Rotten Tomatoes, 43% of 14 critics' reviews are positive. The website's consensus reads: "Mulligan might feature an appealing spread of voice actors, but it'll need to swap out its stale sense of humor for more incisive jokes if it wants to win another term." Metacritic, which uses a weighted average, assigned the series a score of 49 out of 100, based on seven critics, indicating "mixed or average" reviews.

The series earned 2.1 million views in its first seven weeks on Netflix, and a further 700,000 views in the last six months of 2023, making it one of the year's least-watched "higher-profile" Netflix productions.
