= Precious Way =

- Born: Chicago, Illinois
- Occupations: Actress; rapper; singer

Precious Way is an American actress, rapper, and singer. Her acting roles typically feature her musical abilities. She has acted in the television series Queens, Days of Our Lives, and Partners in Rhyme. She is a main cast member in the Peacock mockumentary The Fall and Rise of Reggie Dinkins.

== Life and career ==
Way began her career as a rapper. She booked her first television acting role on the soap opera Days of Our Lives by submitting a self-tape shortly after the COVID-19 pandemic began. She was cast as the recurring character Chanel. She left the role to act as a lead in the rap sitcom Partners in Rhyme (2021–2022) opposite MC Lyte. She was also a recurring character on the musical drama Queens (2021–2022) starring Brandy, Eve, and Naturi Naughton.

As of 2026 Way is main cast member on the comedy The Fall and Rise of Reggie Dinkins as the titular character's fiancée Brina, an influencer and aspiring musical artist. Way sang the show's theme song.

Way was born and raised in Chicago.

== Accolades ==
- 2026 – Nominee, Black Reel Award for Best Original Song (for "Cookin it Up" on The Fall and Rise of Reggie Dinkins)
