= Girls5eva =

2021 American musical comedy television series

- Genre: Comedy; Musical
- Created by: Meredith Scardino
- Starring: Sara Bareilles; Busy Philipps; Paula Pell; Renée Elise Goldsberry
- Music by: Jeff Richmond; Giancarlo Vulcano
- Country of origin: United States
- Original language: English
- No. of seasons: 3
- No. of episodes: 22

Production
- Executive producers: Meredith Scardino; Tina Fey; Robert Carlock; Jeff Richmond; David Miner; Eric Gurian
- Producers: Lauren Gurganous; Matt Whitaker; Dara Schnapper; Steven Ast; Bill Sell; Kimmy Gatewood; Janine Brito; John Mahone; Joe Dinnen
- Cinematography: John G. Inwood
- Editors: Jon Philpot; Nicole Brik; Micah Gardner; Nathan Floody; Agnès Challe-Grandits; Kyle Gilman; Sean M Cusack
- Running time: 25–33 minutes
- Production companies: Little Stranger; Bevel Gears; 3 Arts Entertainment; Scardino and Sons; Universal Television

Original release
- Network: Peacock
- Release: May 6, 2021 – June 9, 2022
- Network: Netflix
- Release: March 14, 2024

Related
- The Four Seasons (TV series)

Girls5eva is an American musical comedy television series created by Meredith Scardino that premiered on May 6, 2021, on Peacock. It follows four women who were part of a girl group named Girls5eva, which was briefly popular around the year 2000 before fading away. Now unfulfilled in their various lives, they reunite to try to find musical success again. In June 2021, it was renewed for a second season, which premiered on May 5, 2022.

In October 2022, after Peacock decided not to continue the series, it was announced that it would move to Netflix for its third season. The third season premiered on March 14, 2024. In December 2024, Netflix canceled the series.

== Premise ==
A 1990s girl group gets an unexpected chance at a comeback when their song is sampled by an up-and-coming rapper.

== Cast ==
=== Main ===
- Sara Bareilles as Dawn Solano, the self-proclaimed "chill one" of Girls5eva, who now works at her brother's Italian restaurant and has a son with her husband
- Busy Philipps as Summer Dutkowsky, the self-proclaimed "hot one" of Girls5eva, who is now married but mostly neglected by her husband, and lives in a mansion with her daughter Stevia
- Paula Pell as Gloria McManus, the self-proclaimed "always working one" of Girls5eva, a dentist who is divorced from her wife
- Renée Elise Goldsberry as Wickie Roy, the self-proclaimed "fierce one" of Girls5eva, who pretends to have a glamorous life for social media. It's revealed her real name is Lesley Wiggins.

=== Recurring ===
- Daniel Breaker as Scott, Dawn's husband, a school counselor unaccustomed to fame.
- Jonathan Hadary as Larry Plumb (seasons 1-2), Girls5eva's sleazy former manager and founder of Plumb Management and Junk Removal
- Ashley Park as Ashley Gold, the fifth member and the self-proclaimed "fun one" of Girls5eva, who was the glue of the band, having been a member of six previous girl groups. She died in an infinity pool accident in 2004 and was memorialized by a bench paid for by her bandmates.
- Erika Henningsen as young Gloria
- Andrew Rannells as Kev Hamlin, a former boy band member and Summer's long-distance husband who works in Tampa, Florida as an entertainment reporter
- Jeremiah Craft as Lil Stinker, a rapper who samples Girls5eva and brings them back to prominence
- Janine Brito as Caroline Bianca Diaz, Gloria's ex-wife
- Grey Henson as Tate (season 2), a young executive at Girls5eva's new record company, "Property Records"
- Piter Marek as Ray (season 2), a talented sound engineer/producer/songwriter who helps Girls5eva write their album
- John Lutz as Percy (seasons 2–3), a victim of a 2000s era prank show featuring Girls5eva and later their assistant on their comeback tour
- Chad L. Coleman as Sheawn (seasons 2–3), a "lunch lord" and love interest of Wickie
- Thomas Doherty as Gray Holland (season 3), a world-famous musician who befriends Gloria.

In addition, Julius Conceição costars as Max, Dawn and Scott's son, a "New York Lonely Boy", and Penelope Richmond as Stevia, Summer and Kev's daughter (seasons 1-2).

=== Guest ===
- Dean Winters as Nick Solano (seasons 1 and 3), Dawn's brother and an entrepreneur who owns ten businesses, one of which is an Italian restaurant where she works
- Jimmy Fallon as himself (season 1)
- Stephen Colbert as Alf Musik (season 1), a songwriter
- Tina Fey as Dolly Parton (season 1), who appears in Dawn's imagination to help inspire her to write songs again
- Bowen Yang as Zander (season 1), a fan of Wickie's who manipulates her ego for his own personal benefit
- Vanessa Williams as Nance Trace (seasons 1 and 3), a famous manager whom Girls5eva approaches to manage them after they fire Larry
- Tim Meadows as himself (season 2)
- Heidi Gardner as Cara (season 2), a parent at Max's school
- Amy Sedaris as Kris and Neil Flynn as Chris Dutkowsky (season 2), Summer's parents who travel the country in a bus and visit Summer after she decides to get a divorce
- Mario Cantone as himself (season 2)
- Mario Lopez as himself (season 3)
- Rebecca Lobo as herself (season 3)
- Ingrid Michaelson as Pixie (season 3), a folk singer-songwriter
- Richard Kind as himself (season 3)

== Episodes ==
=== Series overview ===
Season	Episodes	Originally released		
Season	Episodes	First released	Last released	Network
1	8	May 6, 2021		Peacock
2	8	May 5, 2022	June 9, 2022	Peacock
3	6	March 14, 2024		Netflix

=== Season 1 (2021) ===
No. overall	No. in season	Title	Directed by	Written by	Original release date
1	1	"Pilot"	Kat Coiro	Meredith Scardino	May 6, 2021
While Dawn is getting her first mammogram, she hears a song from the rapper Lil Stinker, who has sampled a song her group recorded 20 years earlier. The band reunites for the first time in years to sing backing vocals for Lil Stinker on The Tonight Show. Bored by their humdrum lives and energized by performing again, they ask to support Lil Stinker on tour, but he tells them they're too old, a sentiment their former manager repeats. Wickie, the only member of the band who's apparently wealthy and happy, heads to the airport, and Dawn chases her to confront her about the way she left the band years ago to start a solo career. Wickie confesses her career never went anywhere. Her glamorous life on social media is a sham; she actually works at an airport. In the morning, Wickie shows up at Dawn's apartment with her suitcase and says she wants to restart the band after all. She apologizes for the past and admits the band members make her better. The four women reunite on a bench they dedicated to their former band member, Ashley, who died in 2004, and confirm their decision to restart the band.
2	2	"D'wasg"	Brennan Shroff	Matt Murray & Meredith Scardino	May 6, 2021
Dawn's husband Scott is getting tired of Wickie's stuff taking over their apartment when her clear grand piano is delivered. It becomes a point of tension until he hears Dawn and Wickie playing and singing together, which makes him relent. Wickie tells Dawn she's her best friend. Summer is having her own marital issues; her husband Kev lives in Tampa and is rarely reachable. She plays a Cameo of Kev for Dawn and Wickie and pretends it's a FaceTime conversation. Meanwhile, the women decide their aim is to play at December's big Jingle Ball concert. Their first step is to gain traction by playing a pop-up show at the mall where they first played as a band. The mall's shut down, but they livestream the performance of "Dream Girlfriends" and are happy with it. However, later that night, they discover the video has been removed because their old manager Larry owns the rights to their songs.
3	3	"Alf Musik"	Brennan Shroff	Lauren Gurganous & Michael Koman	May 6, 2021
The women realize they can't perform their songs without Larry's permission, so they need new songs. They approach Alf Musik, the reclusive Swedish man who wrote their old songs and has written many hits. He writes another song for them, but they reject it as too misogynistic. They realize all their old hits were misogynistic, too. He writes a new song to better reflect who they are now, but it's about being sad and invisible, which is how Alf sees them. They reject it, too, and decide Dawn will write their new songs instead; she used to write before Larry shot down her efforts twenty years earlier. Meanwhile, Dawn has been putting off her planned attempts to get pregnant because it would interfere with the band. However, she's afraid of raising Max as a "New York lonely boy," an eccentric only child who befriends doormen and is more at home with adults than kids. But when they run into John Slattery, Talia Balsam, and their adult son on the street, she's reassured. She tells Scott she's okay with Max being an only child, but he says he really wants a second child.
4	4	"Carma"	LP	Anna Drezen & Azie Dungey	May 6, 2021
Dawn attempts to write her first song by fasting and writing all night. Dolly Parton comes to her in a hallucination, and Dawn tells her she doesn't remember how to do anything but be a mom. Dolly helps her write what Dawn thinks is a fantastic song, "I'm Afraid (Dawn's Song of Fears)." Having stayed up all night writing it, she rushes over to an event at Kev and Summer's house to perform it for the band. They immediately realize it's awful and pull the plug on Dawn's microphone. Back at home, Dolly tells Dawn that she wrote 5,000 songs before writing her biggest hits, so Dawn should keep trying. Meanwhile, Wickie has been dating a younger man who turns out to be a set of twins pranking her for TikTok, but Wickie was too narcissistic to notice. And Summer becomes convinced Kev is cheating on her because of certain credit card charges, so she damages his convertible. But when he tells her his credit card was stolen, she believes he's innocent, blames the car damage on their daughter, and talks him into coming home one additional weekend each month.
5	5	"Catskills"	LP	Chelsea Devantez & Berkley Johnson	May 6, 2021
The women go to a cabin in the Catskills to write songs. When they discover the cabin's owner hiding in a closet because she has nowhere else to go, Dawn gives her money to stay in a motel. Wickie tells Dawn she's too much of a people-pleaser and that the band will never succeed if Dawn doesn't learn to speak up. Gloria goes to the farmers market to "accidentally" run in to her ex-wife Caroline, and even though the two sleep together, Caroline says she doesn't want to get back together because Gloria is a workaholic. Gloria realizes her tendency toward overwork began when Girls5Eva started in order to avoid attention from boys before she came out. Summer, who's been tasked with making a salad because Wickie and Dawn don't like her songwriting ideas, confesses she doesn't know how to make a salad or do anything else useful. And Wickie is forced to confess she charged the others for the cabin rental even though she was getting it for free as an Instagram influencer. As the women admit their flaws to each other, they're inspired to write the song "Four Stars" about being imperfect but still good enough.
6	6	"Cease and Desist"	Kimmy Gatewood	Matt Whitaker	May 6, 2021
The group gets asked to perform at a Pride event celebrating music of the 2000s. Gloria expects to be celebrated as a gay icon, but it turns out Wickie is the famous one because YouTube star Zander made a lip synch video to a meltdown Wickie had while performing in a community theater musical based on the movie The Mask. When Wickie learns Zander has made $80,000 off endorsements and merchandise, Wickie and Gloria cut a deal with him: Zander heckles them while they perform their new song "Four Stars," and Gloria tells him off from the stage. Later, Zander will make a video that includes part of the song and a lip synch to Gloria's rant, bringing attention to the song and making Gloria the gay icon she's dreamed of being. After the show, Scott confesses he's worried Dawn will leave him as she rises to fame. She reassures him she loves him for being normal and grounded.
7	7	"A.I.R.P.I.G."	Kimmy Gatewood	Ava Coleman & Michael Koman	May 6, 2021
Dawn's songwriting is taking off and Zander's lip synch with Gloria has 3 million views. They attend an event for radio DJs in Tampa to promote their new song and talk to Nance, a powerhouse manager. She says they'll never work out as a band but offers to help them each find solo success. Feeling confident, they reject her offer, but Larry tells them their music was popular before only because he paid radio stations to play it. Wickie sees Dawn leaving Nance's room with a smile and, thinking Dawn has betrayed the band, takes Nance's offer of a job as a TV competition judge. Then she discovers Dawn only sold Nance some of the songs she wrote that Girls5Eva rejected. But it's too late; Wickie is flying to Atlanta that night to start her new job. Dawn has already spent the money she earned paying radio stations to play their music. Also on the trip, Summer visits Kev's Tampa home for the first time and discovers he's secretly quit his job in order to rehabilitate crabs. Summer at first is relieved, but then she realizes she's tired of pretending their relationship is fine and says she wants a divorce.
8	8	"Separ8 Ways"	Chioke Nassor	Anna Drezen & Meredith Scardino	May 6, 2021
The band holds auditions to replace Wickie but can't find anyone good enough. They program a holographic Ashley to sing the national anthem with them at a hockey game, but it malfunctions and ruins the performance. Disheartened, they each take the jobs Nance offered them: Summer does TV ads for shapewear, Gloria becomes a dentist for touring musicians, and Dawn sells her songs to other singers. Wickie continues judging the show "American Warrior Singer," which offers her a 1,000-year contract that forbids her from other work. All four women find themselves at the Jingle Ball for their respective jobs, and when they run into each other, they decide to find a way to perform. When Wickie goes on stage to announce the next act, the other women rush the stage and sing "Four Stars." The crowd appears to love them. The women are immediately kicked out of the venue afterwards, but they're exuberant. As they walk down the street, Gloria says she thinks Ashley faked her death.

=== Season 2 (2022) ===
No. overall	No. in season	Title	Directed by	Written by	Original release date
9	1	"Album Mode"	Jeff Richmond	Meredith Scardino	May 5, 2022
The group is signed by record label "Property Records" and they enter what Wickie dubs "Album Mode". Tate, an executive at the record company, asks them to write an album in six weeks. The group debuts their new song at a talent showcase for executives and Gloria busts her knee doing a death drop. The label is very impressed by their performance so, despite needing a knee replacement, Gloria decides to do an interview while on painkillers. Despite initially encouraging Gloria's decision to delay her surgery to do the promotional tour, the rest of the group eventually agree that she can't risk her health and they announce that they're taking a break until Gloria recovers. Wickie is distracted by getting access to celebrity dating app, Raya. Dawn, meanwhile, confronts a mom at her son's school who only emails other moms about their kids' schedules, excluding dads like Scott who are more involved with their kids.
10	2	"Triumphant Return to the Studio"	Brennan Shroff	Ron Weiner	May 5, 2022
Girls5eva start recording at the studio with the help of sound engineer Ray, who also turns out to be a producer and songwriter. Dawn writes a song using every definition of the word "set" and she gets defensive when Ray tries to improve it. She sends him away, but later asks him to come back. Wickie invites paparazzi attention until she finds out they photographed her "bad foot", and she then has to do damage control. Gloria claims that she was discharged from the hospital and she sits in on recording sessions until a nurse comes to pick her up since she's still in recovery. Summer and her husband Kev clash over how to handle their divorce announcement, with Kev sneakily recording a song that paints Summer in a bad light. He ultimately agrees to give Summer everything she wants in exchange for him getting to retain their fanbase.
11	3	"Who U Know"	Brennan Shroff	Liz Cackowski & Azie Dungey	May 5, 2022
The group attempts to self-promote and fails. Wickie tries out being their publicist and manages to get them invited to Lil Stinker's music video shoot. They end up getting a bigger role in the video, but only because all the other celebrities dropped out because of a scandal Lil Stinker got involved in. He eventually cancels the entire shoot, but the girls make the most of their fancy wardrobe and makeup by shooting a year's worth of social media posts. Dawn takes her son Max to work and he gets a shot at fame by playing a young Lil Stinker, but he isn't good enough and Dawn is relieved. Summer pushes Gloria to flirt with women on set despite being bad at it and she eventually manages to secure a phone number, but still ends up sleeping with her ex-wife after they reconnect. Summer disapproves, but agrees not to interfere in exchange for Gloria promising not to meddle in her affairs either.
12	4	"Can't Wait 2 Wait"	LP	Lauren Gurganous	May 12, 2022
Summer's parents visit on a break from their ministry tour and ask her to take a chastity vow until her next marriage. Summer admires their enduring love and considers it while the rest of the group advises her against it. Wickie starts dating a celebrity implied to be Shaquille O'Neal, but she has to sign an NDA contract and the whole relationship appears to be shallow. She reveals why she doesn't date non-celebrities, but ultimately opens up to the idea again. Dawn spends a lot of time at the studio with Ray trying to crack the band's love song. Ray suggests they take a break and they end up watching "Business Throne" (a "Succession" parody), which is a show Dawn usually watches with Scott. Scott is upset when he finds out, which leads to them having an honest conversation about their relationship and deciding to spend more quality time together. Gloria spearheads the girls' effort to stop Summer from accepting the chastity ring from her dad, figuring out that her parents didn't wait to have sex until marriage. After hearing their explanation about wanting to protect her, Summer almost goes through with the purity ceremony, but at the last moment decides that she can take care of herself.
13	5	"Leave a Message If You Love Me"	Linda Mendoza	Matt Whitaker	May 19, 2022
Dawn writes the love song of the album and the group records it, but runs into some copyright issues. Gloria obsesses over a mysterious singer named T.K. whose face no one has ever seen and she concludes that it's Ashley. Wickie agrees to help her investigate further despite being skeptical. Dawn and Summer go to a med spa and Summer insists she didn't get a face lift while Dawn tries to dissuade her from getting more plastic surgery in the future. After their love song is scrapped, Dawn writes a revenge song about their terrible old manager Larry. He overhears and threatens to sue if they don't give him a cowriting credit, but Dawn figures out that his zingers included in the song were all lifted from a movie. Gloria and Wickie ambush T.K. in the bathroom and take off her mask, revealing that she isn't Ashley. The failed mission makes them reminisce about Ashley and the outgoing voice message on her phone, which was never disconnected, becomes part of the group's new love song.
14	6	"B.P.E."	Linda Mendoza	Sam Means & Taylor Cox	May 26, 2022
The group records several songs for their album, with Wickie taking the lead on most of them. Tate suggests that they should each audition to sing the solo Dawn wrote about her grandmother. Gloria and Summer later confront Dawn about going behind their backs and underhandedly getting Tate to suggest the auditions because she wanted to sing the solo. Wickie and Scott bond during a karaoke night, where it's revealed that Scott is a good singer, and he helps Wickie deal with a past traumatic experience on "Star Search". Dawn and Wickie clash over the solo, but eventually reconcile and Wickie agrees that Dawn should sing it. Meanwhile, the girls are supposed to purge their social media of any incriminating content, leading Gloria and Summer to confront their problematic stint on a prank show in the early 2000s. Gloria apologizes to the man they pranked while Summer helps him get some payback.
15	7	"Returnity"	Kimmy Gatewood	John Mahone & Ava Coleman	June 2, 2022
The group finally finishes their comeback album, Returnity, but are disappointed when Tate reveals the label's weak plan to promote it. Dawn tries to find the source of her strange medical issues. Wickie meets Scott's friend Sheawn and initially rebuffs him, but allows him to make her dinner after she realizes he can help her understand how to appeal to "normal" people. Gloria and Caroline struggle to have a romantic evening at Gloria's place, and they decide to move in together. While showing them an apartment, Kev learns that Gloria has held on to another woman's phone number and offers her some relationship advice. The group attempts a Beatles-style rooftop concert, which ends disastrously when they realize they're on a hospital helipad. Wickie finds herself inexplicably attracted to Sheawn. Tate calls to offer the group a shot at opening for Collab on tour, and Dawn learns that she's pregnant.
16	8	"Tour Mode"	Kimmy Gatewood	Meredith Scardino & Sam Nulman	June 9, 2022
Girls5Eva performs at Terminal 5, going up against Co-Z Boi to determine who will go on tour with Collab. The audience reacts positively to their performance of "Bend Not Break," but leaves during Co-Z Boi's set. Tate hints that Girls5Eva will be selected as the opener. Each member of the group struggles with their own fears about going on tour: Dawn is pregnant, Wickie doesn't want to give up her new relationship with Sheawn, Gloria worries that Caroline will cheat on her if she leaves, and Summer doesn't think Kev can handle Stevia on his own. Despite Girls5Eva's success at the concert, the Property Brothers announce that Co-Z Boi will be joining the tour instead. Gloria confronts them on set and they reveal that they wanted the less likable opener so they can sell more concessions. Lil Stinker, who has rebranded as country artist Bootsy Tings, calls to tell them that their song about Fort Worth has become popular in the city. The group convinces each other to overcome their fears and leaves New York to embark on their own tour.

=== Season 3 (2024) ===
No. overall	No. in season	Title	Directed by	Written by	Original release date
17	1	"Fort Worth"	Kimmy Gatewood	Dan Rubin	March 14, 2024
Girls5eva performs successfully in Fort Worth for several weeks. Wickie pushes Dawn to plan their next stops, but Dawn is reluctant to do so because she enjoys having downtime. Gloria has a one night stand with a fan, but gets too attached. Despite her fear of driving Wickie away again, Summer volunteers to plan. Eventually, Wickie takes their earnings and books Radio City Music Hall.
18	2	"Bomont"	Kimmy Gatewood	Janine Brito & Meredith Scardino	March 14, 2024
Gloria worries about the lack of lesbians in their next stop, a town in the Ozarks. While at an ultrasound, Dawn gets the attention of conservative, pro-life state senator Chuck Dennis, who is revealed to own their upcoming performance venues. Meanwhile, Summer has a fling with a biker and styles herself a biker chick, before realizing she needs to develop her own identity. Wickie and Dawn initially agree to placate Chuck by performing John Cougar Mellencamp covers instead of their setlist, but are eventually convinced by Summer and Gloria to perform "Big Pussy Energy". Chuck evicts the women and the subsequent stops are cancelled.
19	3	"Clarksville"	Kimmy Gatewood	Robert Carlock & John Mahone	March 14, 2024
The group stays with Wickie's well-off parents in Clarksville, Maryland. Wickie worries that her parents were too coddling, resulting in her present lack of success. Summer joins an MLM scheme involving teeth-whitening gummies, and tries to sell a box to Wickie's parents, but the gummies cause her teeth and digestive tract to glow. Dawn convinces Wickie to ask her parents to buy out their Radio City contract, but this causes Wickie to have a self-esteem crisis. To fix it, Dawn asks them to act tough, inspiring Wickie to continue.
20	4	"Orlando"	Kimmy Gatewood	Sam Means & Meredith Scardino	March 14, 2024
Girls5eva arrives in Orlando, Florida to perform at the birthday party of Taffy, a young woman married to a wealthy older man. At the party, Summer tries to make up with Pixie, a folk singer whose song she ruined by scatting live with her years ago. Wickie briefly reconnects with Torque, an old flame, before realizing she truly loves "Lunch Lord". Dawn is reluctant to perform the group's old problematic music; however, Taffy retorts that Dawn also misses her days of youth and fame. Gloria fixes the situation by inviting Taffy to perform with the group.
21	5	"Cleveland"	Kimmy Gatewood	Robert Carlock & Sam Means	March 14, 2024
While in Cleveland, Ohio, the other members of Girls5eva realize that Gloria has befriended world-famous pop star Gray Holland. Gray, who is tired of his fame, elects to perform with Girls5eva and hangs out at their motel room afterwards. The women attempt to invite him to perform at Radio City Music Hall with them, but he angrily reprimands them for using him as a shortcut to fame. To help him, Gloria fakes Gray's death by switching his teeth out with that of a fox that died in her care; this causes a boycott of their tour from Gray's enraged fans. Gray is seen happily performing at a Canadian dive bar with his fox-toothed mouth.
22	6	"New York"	Kimmy Gatewood	Meredith Scardino	March 14, 2024
Two days before their Radio City Music Hall performance, the group has sold no tickets and has begun souring on each other. Wickie attempts to sell their documentary to a streamer, but pivots to faking a true crime documentary with Percy as the murderer. Dawn meets Richard Kind, who encourages her to seek moderate fame. Gloria thinks that Caroline is her soulmate but learns that she has moved on. Summer manipulates resale bots to sell out Radio City. The group performs for their friends and family. Dawn gives birth and names the baby Lesley, after Wickie. Wickie's song "Yesternights" plays on the fictional finale of The Crown, and due to this newfound fame, is offered the chance to contribute to the soundtrack of a film.

== Production ==
=== Development ===
On January 16, 2020, Tina Fey announced at a Peacock investor presentation event that she was executive-producing an original series for the upcoming streaming service.

The series is executive-produced by Fey, Meredith Scardino, Robert Carlock, Jeff Richmond, David Miner and Eric Gurian. Production companies involved are Fey's Little Stranger, Carlock's Bevel Gears, 3 Arts Entertainment and Universal Television. In October 2020, it was announced that the pilot episode would be directed by Kat Coiro. On June 14, 2021, Peacock renewed the series for a second season. On October 27, 2022, it was announced that the series would move from Peacock to Netflix for its third season after being canceled on Peacock after the second season concluded. On December 17, 2024, Netflix canceled the series.

Some filming took place at Kaufman Astoria Studios in Queens, New York, best known as the home of Sesame Street.

=== Casting ===
On August 10, 2020, Sara Bareilles was cast in a starring role. In October 2020, Renée Elise Goldsberry, Busy Philipps, and Paula Pell were stated to be joining the cast in starring roles alongside Bareilles. In the same month, Ashley Park joined the cast in a recurring role. On April 14, 2021, Daniel Breaker was announced as cast in a recurring role. On March 13, 2022, Scardino revealed that Amy Sedaris and Neil Flynn joined the cast for the second season at the SXSW Studio in Austin, Texas. On April 6, 2022, additional guest stars were announced including Amber Ruffin, Chad L. Coleman, Grey Henson, Heidi Gardner, Hoda Kotb, James Monroe Iglehart, John Lutz, Judy Gold, Mario Cantone, Pat Battle, Piter Marek, Tim Meadows, and Property Brothers Drew Scott and Jonathan Scott, alongside returning guest stars Andrew Rannells, Park, Erika Henningsen, Janine Brito, Jeremiah Craft, Jonathan Hadary, Breaker, and Julius Conceicao. Actors joining the cast for season 3 include Adriane Lenox, Ron Canada, Thomas Doherty, Catherine Cohen, and Ingrid Michaelson.

=== Filming ===
Filming for season 3, which took six weeks with one director and scenes from different episodes shot in a row, based on the location available, had been completed before the 2023 Writers Guild of America strike.

=== Music ===
Most of the original songs for Girls5eva were composed by executive producer Jeff Richmond with lyrics by Meredith Scardino. The songs were inspired by music of the late 1990s. Bareilles also contributed to writing "4 Stars" and "I'm Afraid (Dawn's Song of Fears)"; she revealed that she was influenced by the music of Destiny's Child, NSYNC, and ABBA. A soundtrack album of the first season was released on May 6, 2021, through Epic Records.

The soundtrack albums of the second and third seasons were released on June 10, 2022 and March 15, 2024 respectively, with Bareilles contributing an original song to each album. Kyle Brier, who was credited as a music assistant in the second season, received writing credits on nine of the twelve tracks on the soundtrack for the third season.

Girls5eva: Music from the Peacock Original Series track listing
No.	Title	Writer(s)	Performer(s)	Length
1.	"Famous 5eva"	Jeff Richmond; Meredith Scardino	Sara Bareilles; Renée Elise Goldsberry; Erika Henningsen; Ashley Park; Busy Philipps	3:03
2.	"Dream Girlfriends"	Richmond; Scardino; Tina Fey	Bareilles; Goldsberry; Paula Pell; Philipps	2:30
3.	"New York Lonely Boy"	Richmond; Scardino	The Milk Carton Kids	2:34
4.	"Space Boys"	Richmond; Scardino	Bareilles; Goldsberry; Henningsen; Park; Philipps	2:31
5.	"I'm Afraid (Dawn's Song of Fears)"	Anna Drezen; Sara Bareilles; Richmond; Scardino	Bareilles	3:22
6.	"The Splingee"	Richmond; Scardino	Bareilles; Goldsberry; Pell; Philipps	2:12
7.	"Boyz Next Door (Puber-Dude)"	Richmond; Scardino; Ava Coleman	Andrew Rannells	2:36
8.	"Line Up"	Coleman; Jeremiah Craft; Michael Koman; Bareilles	Jeremiah Craft; Bareilles; Goldsberry; Pell; Philipps	2:51
9.	"4 Stars"	Bareilles	Bareilles; Goldsberry; Pell; Philipps	3:34

Girls5eva Season 2: Music from the Peacock Original Series track listing
No.	Title	Writer(s)	Performer(s)	Length
1.	"Momentum"	Jeff Richmond; Meredith Scardino; Matt Whitaker	Sara Bareilles; Renée Elise Goldsberry; Paula Pell; Busy Philipps	1:51
2.	"Who U Know"	Ava Coleman; Jeremiah Craft; John Malone; Scardino	Jeremiah Craft	2:47
3.	"Thinking About Myself"	Richmond; Scardino	Bareilles; Goldsberry; Pell; Philipps	2:02
4.	"Can't Wait 2 Wait"	Richmond; Scardino; Lauren Gurganous; Michael Koman	Philipps; Andrew Rannells	2:16
5.	"U Ready?"	Richmond; Scardino; Koman	Bareilles; Goldsberry; Erika Henningsen; Ashley Park; Pell; Philipps	1:49
6.	"Larry's Song"	Richmond; Scardino; Whitaker	Bareilles; Philipps	2:04
7.	"Summer Brings the Fall"	Richmond; Ron Weiner	Rannells	1:17
8.	"At the Beep"	Richmond; Scardino; Whitaker	Bareilles; Goldsberry; Park; Pell; Philipps	2:05
9.	"New York City Moms"	Richmond; Scardino	Ingrid Michaelson	2:18
10.	"B.P.E."	Richmond; Scardino; Coleman	Bareilles; Goldsberry; Pell; Philipps	1:32
11.	"Bend Not Break"	Sara Bareilles	Bareilles; Goldsberry; Pell; Philipps	2:25
12.	"B.P.E. (Club Remix)" (Bonus track)	Richmond; Scardino; Coleman	Bareilles; Goldsberry; Pell; Philipps; Eric Kupper	3:34

Girls5eva Season 3: Music from the Netflix Original Series track listing
No.	Title	Writer(s)	Performer(s)	Length
1.	"Tap Into Your (Fort) Worth"	Kyle Brier; Liz Cackowski; Azie Dungey; Jeff Richmond; Dan Rubin; Meredith Scardino	Sara Bareilles; Renée Elise Goldsberry; Paula Pell; Busy Philipps	2:20
2.	"Inside My Sweater"	Brier; Richmond; Scardino	Thomas Doherty	2:48
3.	"Daughter Hero"	Brier; Robert Carlock; Richmond; Scardino	Goldsberry	1:47
4.	"Is There A Me?"	Brier; Janine Brito; Scardino	Philipps	1:24
5.	"Sweet'N Low Daddy"	Brier; Richmond; Scardino	Bareilles; Goldsberry; Pell; Philipps	2:31
6.	"Get It Off Your Chest"	Brier; Scardino	Bareilles; Goldsberry; Pell; Philipps	3:18
7.	"Home Alone Doorknob"	Richmond; Scardino	Goldsberry	0:31
8.	"Later"	Brier; Brito; Scardino	Bareilles	1:25
9.	"No Strings"	Richmond; Rubin	Pell	1:03
10.	"Welcome to Now"	Brier; Carlock; Sam Means; Scardino	Doherty	1:18
11.	"Yesternights"	Brier; Richmond; Scardino	Goldsberry	2:19
12.	"The Medium Time"	Sara Bareilles	Bareilles; Goldsberry; Pell; Philipps	2:10

== Release ==
The series premiered on May 6, 2021 on Peacock. Selected episodes made their linear TV debut on E!. In Canada, it was set to debut on W Network on June 3, 2021. The second season premiered on May 5, 2022, with the first three episodes available immediately and the rest debuting weekly. All six episodes of the third season were released on March 14, 2024 on Netflix.

== Reception ==
=== Critical response ===
On Rotten Tomatoes, the first season holds an approval rating of 98% based on 49 critic reviews. The website's critics consensus reads: "Smart, funny, and just nostalgic enough, Girls5Eva's intelligent insights are brought to brilliant life by its talented quartet, whose individual gifts come together to make sweet comedic harmony." On Metacritic, the first season has a score of 80 out of 100 based on 23 critics, indicating "generally favorable reviews".

The second season has a 95% approval rating on Rotten Tomatoes based on 22 critic reviews. The website's critics consensus states, "Like an addictive pop song, Girls5Eva is just as delightful the second time around, with its band of scrappy divas remaining one of the funniest ensembles on television." On Metacritic, the second season received a score of 81 out of 100 based on 10 critics, indicating "universal acclaim".

The third season holds a 100% approval rating on Rotten Tomatoes based on 23 critic reviews. The website's critics consensus reads, "Sustaining a high note with enough finesse to go platinum, Girls5Eva's third season is just as daffy and jubilant as the first two." For the third season, Metacritic assigned a score of 82 out of 100 based on 8 critics, indicating "universal acclaim".

=== Awards and nominations ===
Year	Award	Category	Nominee(s)	Result	Ref.
2021	Black Reel Awards for Television	Outstanding Actress, Comedy Series	Renée Elise Goldsberry	Nominated	
2021	Black Reel Awards for Television	Outstanding Guest Actress, Comedy Series	Vanessa Williams	Nominated	
2021	Black Reel Awards for Television	Outstanding Directing, Comedy Series	Chioke Nassor (for "Separ8 Ways")	Nominated	
2021	Black Reel Awards for Television	Outstanding Writing, Comedy Series	Anna Drezen & Azie Dungey (for "Carma")	Nominated	
2021	Dorian TV Awards	Best TV Comedy	Girls5eva	Nominated	
2021	Gold Derby TV Awards	Best Comedy Series	Girls5eva	Nominated	
2021	Gold Derby TV Awards	Best Comedy Actress	Sara Bareilles	Nominated	
2021	Gold Derby TV Awards	Best Comedy Actress	Renée Elise Goldsberry	Nominated	
2021	Gold Derby TV Awards	Best Comedy Guest Actress	Tina Fey	Nominated	
2021	Gold Derby TV Awards	Best Comedy Guest Actor	Andrew Rannells	Nominated	
2021	Gold Derby TV Awards	Ensemble of the Year	The Ensemble of Girls5eva	Nominated	
2021	Hollywood Critics Association TV Awards	Best Streaming Series, Comedy	Girls5eva	Nominated	
2021	Hollywood Critics Association TV Awards	Best Actress in a Streaming Series, Comedy	Renée Elise Goldsberry	Nominated	
2021	Hollywood Critics Association TV Awards	Best Supporting Actress in a Streaming Series, Comedy	Paula Pell	Nominated	
2021	International Online Cinema Awards (INOCA)	Program of the Year	Girls5eva	Nominated	
2021	International Online Cinema Awards (INOCA)	Best Comedy Series	Girls5eva	Nominated	
2021	International Online Cinema Awards (INOCA)	Best New Series	Girls5eva	Nominated	
2021	International Online Cinema Awards (INOCA)	Best Actress in a Comedy Series	Renée Elise Goldsberry	Nominated	
2021	International Online Cinema Awards (INOCA)	Best Supporting Actress in a Comedy Series	Paula Pell	Nominated	
2021	International Online Cinema Awards (INOCA)	Best Guest Actress in a Comedy Series	Tina Fey	Nominated	
2021	International Online Cinema Awards (INOCA)	Best Guest Actor in a Comedy Series	Stephen Colbert	Nominated	
2021	International Online Cinema Awards (INOCA)	Best Guest Actor in a Comedy Series	Bowen Yang	Nominated	
2021	International Online Cinema Awards (INOCA)	Best Writing in a Comedy Series	Meredith Scardino (for "Pilot")	Nominated	
2021	International Online Cinema Awards (INOCA)	Best Ensemble in a Comedy Series	The Ensemble of Girls5eva	Nominated	
2021	Primetime Emmy Awards	Outstanding Writing for a Comedy Series	Meredith Scardino (for "Pilot")	Nominated	
2021	Television Critics Association Awards	Outstanding Achievement in Comedy	Girls5eva	Nominated	
2021	Television Critics Association Awards	Individual Achievement in Comedy	Renée Elise Goldsberry	Nominated	
2022	Critics' Choice Television Awards	Best Actress in a Comedy Series	Renée Elise Goldsberry	Nominated	
2023	Critics' Choice Television Awards	Best Actress in a Comedy Series	Renée Elise Goldsberry	Nominated	
2024	Black Reel Awards	Outstanding Lead Performance in a Comedy Series	Renée Elise Goldsberry	Nominated	
2024	Primetime Creative Arts Emmy Awards	Outstanding Original Music and Lyrics	Sara Bareilles (for "The Medium Time")	Nominated	
2024	Primetime Emmy Awards	Outstanding Writing for a Comedy Series	Meredith Scardino and Sam Means (for "Orlando")	Nominated	
2024	Television Critics Association Awards	Outstanding Achievement in Comedy	Girls5eva	Nominated	
2024	Television Critics Association Awards	Individual Achievement in Comedy	Renée Elise Goldsberry	Nominated	
2024	Hollywood Music in Media Awards	Original Song – TV Show/Limited Series	Sara Bareilles ("The Medium Time")	Nominated	
