= High Tide (2024 film) =

American romantic drama film by Marco Calvani

- Theatrical release poster
- Directed by: Marco Calvani
- Written by: Marco Calvani
- Produced by: Mickey Lidell; Pete Shilaimon; Marco Calvani
- Starring: Marco Pigossi; James Bland; Marisa Tomei; Bill Irwin
- Cinematography: Oscar Ignacio Jiménez
- Edited by: Anisha Acharya
- Music by: Sebastian Plano
- Production company: LD Entertainment
- Distributed by: Strand Releasing
- Release dates: March 9, 2024 (SXSW); October 18, 2024
- Running time: 101 minutes
- Country: United States
- Languages: English; Portuguese

High Tide is a 2024 American romantic drama film written and directed by Marco Calvani and starring Marco Pigossi, James Bland, Marisa Tomei, and Bill Irwin.

== Synopsis ==
Heartbroken and adrift, undocumented Brazilian immigrant Lourenço searches for purpose in the queer mecca of Provincetown. As the summer season comes to an end, he sparks an intense and unexpected romance with Maurice. Together, the two reconcile the pasts they have left behind and their uncertain futures.

== Cast ==
- Marco Pigossi as Lourenço
- James Bland as Maurice
- Marisa Tomei as Miriam
- Bill Irwin as Scott
- Sean Mahon as Bob
- Mya Taylor as Crystal
- Bryan Batt as Todd
- Todd Flaherty as Leslie
- Karl Gregory as BJ
- João Santos as Dimo

== Release ==
The film premiered at South by Southwest on March 9, 2024. It was released in New York on October 18, 2024, followed by an expansion to Los Angeles on October 25, and select US cities on November 1. High Tide had its European premiere at the 39th BFI Flare Film Festival in London (19th–30th March 2025).

== Reception ==
On the review aggregator website Rotten Tomatoes, 100% of 25 critics' reviews are positive, with an average rating of 7.8/10.

Chris Azzopardi of The New York Times hailed the film as "poignant" and rewarded it with the Critic's Pick certification.

Siddhant Adlakha of Variety gave the film a positive review. He called the film "beautiful and devastating" and wrote, "...Pigossi delivers a stunning performance".

David Rooney of The Hollywood Reporter also gave the film a positive review and wrote: "Marco Calvani's sensitively observed first feature… speaks from the heart". He also praised Pigossi's "haunting lead performance, steeped in melancholy and raw pain but also in moments of openness, optimism and even joy, helps make High Tide an affecting portrait of untethered gay men seeking meaningful connections".

Ryan Lattanzio of IndieWire graded the film a B−. He called the film "sexy, sad… frank and honest [and] palpably hot," and remarked that the film "dares you not to be obsessed with - and attracted to - its leading man Marco Pigossi".
