= Child's Play Touring Theatre =

Chicago-based theatre company

Child's Play Touring Theatre (CPTT) is a non-profit arts-education touring theatre company based in Chicago. Founded in 1978 by June and Victor Podagrosi, CPTT was the first theatre company where professional actors take original works written by children and perform them on stage. Since its founding, CPTT has performed in 40 states from Alaska to Florida and Maine to California, reaching an audience of over 4.5 million and performing the works of over 17,000 young writers.

== History ==
Child's Play Touring Theatre was founded in 1978 by Victor and June Podagrosi in Champaign, IL while Victor was teaching theatre at Parkland College. The idea for CPTT emerged after Victor was asked to stage a performance of children's writings at a Young Author's awards ceremony and was inspired by their storytelling abilities. Victor said he enjoyed using the writings of children "because there's so much truth in there. Their imagination is so very pure and simple." CPTT became a non-for-profit organization in 1980 and relocated to Chicago in 1982.

Since its founding, Child's Play has performed at a number of notable venues including the Goodman Theatre, Smithsonian Institution, Brooklyn Academy of Music, Ravinia, Tampa Bay Performing Arts Center, The Field Museum, Museum of Science and Industry (Chicago) and at events such as International Children's Festival at Wolf Trap.

== Organization ==
Child's Play is a nationally recognized 501(c)(3) non-for-profit organization that is entirely self-funded through donations and sponsorships. Sponsors have included National Endowment for the Arts, Turtle Wax, Dykema Gossett, and DeVry, Inc. CPTT relies primarily upon the support of volunteers.

== Educational Programs ==
CPTT offers a variety of educational programs for students and teachers alike. Some of these programs include summer camps, classes and after school programs for children and teens, teacher workshops and writing workshops for students.

=== Notable Projects ===
Over the years, CPTT has produced a number of notable shows and educational programs. Some of these projects include:

- Kids for President! - (1988, 1992, 1996, 2008, 2012) Produced in election years, Kids for President gives children "a unique opportunity to learn about the issues that are important to them and the election." Kids for President! was the keynote performance at the national Kid's Convention of '96 at Chicago's Whitney Young High School held after the Democratic National Convention in Chicago. CPTT also performed Kids for President! at the Chicago Theatre for the book signing of Hillary Clinton's It Takes a Village.
- Hands Together, Heart to Art - (2005, 2006) - A summer program for children who have experienced the death of one or both parents. Hands Together, Heart to Art became a finalist in the NCASS Creative and Innovative Awards Program.
- The Great Green Adventures of R-Man and Earth Kid - (2010–Present) A comic book style show based on stories and poems written by children from around the country that shows how kids think the planet can be saved.
- Global Energy: The Musical - (2011) CPTT's most recent ongoing project focuses on different types of energy used throughout the world today and on global conservation efforts.

== The Victor Award ==
In memory of founder Victor Podagrosi, Child's Play has established The Victor Award to "honor individuals and organizations who have demonstrated outstanding commitment, generosity, and/or service to Child's Play Touring Theatre and the arts community." There is both a Local and an International Victor Award.

=== The Local Victor Award ===
The Victor Award is "awarded locally each year to individuals and companies who have shown a strong commitment to Child's Play and to working with the arts."

==== Past Recipients ====
- 1997 - Tammy Steele, Marcia Lipetz
- 1998 - Janet Brooks, Jasculca/Terman and Associates, Inc.
- 1999 - Andy Laities, Illinois Arts Council
- 2000 - Tammy Walker, City of Chicago, Department of Cultural Affairs
- 2001 - Child's Play Touring Theatre Awarded by Illinois Theatre Association
- 2002 - Richard A. Devine, State's Attorney
- 2003 - Perry Cavitt
- 2004 - Kraft Foods, Inc., Deborah Bricker, Albert Goodman
- 2006 - Sondra Healy, Bernard Garbo, Jo-Ella Podagrosi-Spratt, Gigi Faraci
- 2007 - Darrell Barber, Eve Moran, Steve Scott, Bella Itkin – Lifetime Achievement Award
- 2008 - Nicole Rohr Lewis, Kevin Gate
- 2009 - George Bliss, Kathy Bliss, Vito Gioia
- 2010 - Jim Coates, Mara Georges, Sharon Thomas Parrott
- 2011 - Walter Jacobson, Diana Mendoza
- 2012 - Jeff Richmond, Marj Halperin
- 2013 - Anita Alvarez, George Howe
- 2014 - Adam McKay, Jackie Taylor
- 2015 - Charles Petering
- 2016 - Robert Falls, Goodman Theatre, Artistic Director
- 2017 - Jane Monzures, WGN, Shari Schlachter, Child's Play Touring Theatre

=== The International Victor Award ===
The International Victor Award is awarded every year at the International Showcase of Performing Arts for Young People to children's theatre companies "who show excellence in their ability to interact with sponsors in a prompt, efficient and compatible manner, and who demonstrate a positive attitude toward their art."

==== Past Recipients ====
- 1998 - Ballet Folklorico
- 1999 - The Red Balloon, Visible Fictions
- 2000 - The Young Americans
- 2001 - Martha
- 2002 - Goodnight Opus, Mermaid Theatre
- 2003 - Shona Reppe Puppets
- 2004 - Hansel and Gretal, Theatre Sans Fil
- 2005 - Snowflake, LaJoye Productions
- 2006 - Hamlet, Det lille Turneteater
- 2007 - Wolf!, Huis aan de Amstel
- 2008 - Pero or Mysteries of the Night, Speeltheatre Holland
- 2009 - The Man Who Planted Trees, Puppet State Theatre Company
- 2010 - Shopping for Shoes, Visible Fictions
- 2011 - Grug, Windmill Theatre (Australia)
- 2012 - Nearly Lear, Susanna Hamnett
- 2013 - Me and My Shadow, Patch Theatre Company (Australia)
- 2014 - Manxmouse, Theatergroep Kwatta
- 2015 - Titus, Macrobert Art Center
- 2016 - Tetris, Erik Kaiel, Arch8

== Notable alumni ==
- Tina Fey
- Adam McKay
- Jeff Richmond
- Tami Sagher
