= Marco Calvani =

Italian playwright (born 1980)

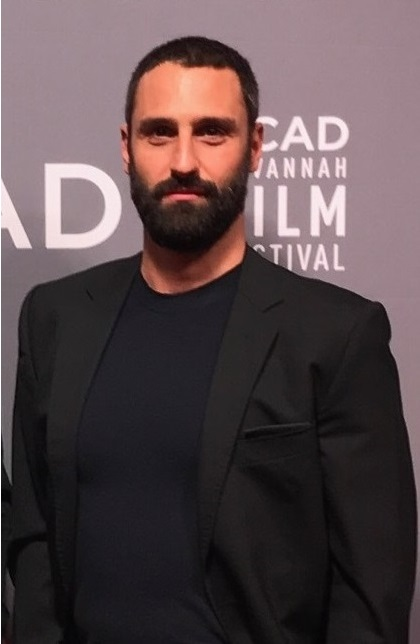
- Calvani at Savannah Film Festival 2017
- Born: 11 December 1980 (age 45); Prato, Tuscany, Italy
- Occupations: Playwright; filmmaker
- Years active: 1996–present
- Spouse: Marco Pigossi (m. 2023)

Marco Calvani (born 11 December 1980) is an Italian playwright, director, filmmaker, translator and actor.

== Biography ==
Trained as an actor since he was a teenager, Calvani made his debut as a playwright in 2002 with Quasi, commissioned by the European Social Forum.

Strong Hands was his first play to be translated and performed to great acclaim throughout Europe. Commissions from the Todi Arte Festival, the Phoenix Theatre, London, La MaMa Experimental Theatre Club of New York, Teatro di Roma, Théâtre de la Ville of Paris and the Festival Grec de Barcelona followed.

His play The City Beneath had its New York City debut at the Sage Theater in 2009. In the same year he also wrote and directed Penelope in Groznyj, performed first at Berlin's Kunsthaus Tacheles and was the only European guest at Bali's international Ubud Writers and Readers Festival.

In 2011 he won a residency at the Cité internationale des arts of Paris and was invited by the Théâtre de la Ville to represent Italy in an international writing project. In the same year he was awarded the SIAE Prize as best playwright at the Spoleto Festival.

He created the project AdA (Author directing Author) with his friend and colleague Neil LaBute, for which he wrote Things of This World (Festival dei Due Mondi of Spoleto, Fringe Festival Madrid, La MaMa Theatre, New York), The Second Time (Venice Biennale Teatro, La MaMa Theatre New York), and After the Dark (Sala Beckett Barcelone, La MaMa Theatre New York).

In 2013 the Teatro Metastasio Stabile della Toscana organized a retrospective of his work for which he wrote and directed I am Dracula. The same year, Glory Kadigan directed the New York premiere of his play Oil, for which he was presented with the Award for Outstanding Playwriting at the Planet Connections Theater Festivity Awards. He is the founder and artistic director of Mixò, an international cultural center that brings together young actors and writers and promotes original works for stage and screen. His works have been translated and performed in six languages.

He is a member of the Dramatists Guild of America and of the Playwrights/Directors Unit at the Actors Studio. He is a permanent artist-in-residence at La MaMa Experimental Theatre Club of New York.

In 2015 he was awarded the Writer Fellowship from the Edward F. Albee Foundation.

His play Beautiful Day Without You was commissioned by the Off-Broadway Origin Theatre Company and had its world premiere at the West End Theatre of New York in November 2018 directed by Erwin Maas.

He teaches writing and acting in the United States and Europe. He translates from English and French into Italian and he is an official translator of Theresa Rebeck, Bernard-Marie Koltès and Bryony Lavery.

Most recently he wrote and directed the short film The View from Up Here (US/France, 2017) starring Melissa Leo and Leïla Bekhti, based on his eponymous play originally commissioned by The Actors Studio and directed by Estelle Parsons.

His second short film A Better Half was named Best Short of 2022 by the British Film Magazine Close-Up.

His first feature film, High Tide, had its world premiere at SXSW in March 2024. It stars Oscar-winner Marisa Tomei, Tony-winner Bill Irwin, Spirit Award-winner Mya Taylor, and Brazilian star Marco Pigossi. He also produced it alongside Mickey Liddell and Pete Shilaimon at LD Entertainment.

As of 2020, he is in a relationship with Brazilian actor Marco Pigossi.

== Plays and films ==
=== Theater (playwright) ===
- Before We Fall Asleep (2019)
- Beautiful Day Without You (2018)
- After the Dark (2016)
- Maspeth (2016)
- The View from Up Here (2016)
- The Conference (2016)
- The Second Time (2014)
- I am Dracula (2013)
- Bad Faith (2012)
- Things of This World (2012)
- Nails (2010)
- Penelope in Groznyj (2009)
- The City Beneath (2009)
- Oil (2008)
- Io che non so che fine farò (2008)
- Strong Hands (2006)
- Low Life (2005)
- Te lo leggo negli occhi (2003)
- Quasi (2002)

=== Theater (director) ===
- I don't know what I can save you from by Neil LaBute (2016)
- Happy Hour by Neil LaBute (2014)
- I am Dracula by Marco Calvani (2013)
- Stockholm by Bryony Lavery (2013)
- Lovely Head by Neil LaBute (2011)
- Nails by Marco Calvani (2010)
- Penelope in Groznyj by Marco Calvani (2009)
- The city beneath by Marco Calvani (2009)
- Oil by Marco Calvani (2008)

=== Film (actor) ===
- You, Me & Tuscany (2026)
- Tode Ti (2013)
- Borgia (2010)
- Il Commissario Manara (2011)
- Good Morning Headache (2008)
- Tutto come prima (2008)
- Family Game (2007)
- Caravaggio (2007)
- Sweet life (2005)
- Manuale d'amore (2004)
- Grandi domani (2004)
- Sandra Kristoff (2003)
- Su di me (2001)
- His Secret Life (2001)

=== Film (writer/director) ===
- High Tide (2024)
- A Better Half (2022)
- The View from Up Here (2017)

=== Television (actor) ===
- The Four Seasons (miniseries) – Netflix (2025)

== Awards and grants ==
- 2025, Global Visionary Award (Upwardly Global Gala Honoree)
- 2025, SeriesFest, Breakthrough Actor Award for The Four Seasons (TV series)
- 2019, The Studios of Key West (Artistic Residency)
- 2018, Origin Theatre Company, New York (Play commission)
- 2017, 42nd Samuel French, Inc. Short Play Festival, New York - finalist with the play "The View from Up Here"
- 2015, Edward F. Albee Foundation, New York (Writer Fellowship)
- 2015, Calcante Prize for The Second Time, Italy
- 2013, Outstanding Playwrighting for Oil, Planet Connections Theater Festivity Awards, New York
- 2011, Prix Marie de Paris, Cité Internationale des Arts (Artistic Residency)
- 2011, SIAE Prize for Best Playwright, Italy
