= Janine Brito =

American comedian

- Born: August 10, 1983 (age 43); Florida, U.S.
- Notable work: Totally Biased with W. Kamau Bell Laughter Against The Machine
- Spouse: Paula Pell (m. 2020)

Comedy career
- Medium: Stand-up comedy
- Website: janinebrito.com

Janine Brito is an American comedian, actress and writer. Prominent within the San Francisco stand-up comedy scene, she is recognized nationally as a writer and on-air correspondent for the television program Totally Biased with W. Kamau Bell, which premiered on FX in 2012. She joined the comedy series One Day at a Time on Netflix in the show's third season as both a writer and actor.

== Early life and career ==
Brito was born in Florida. She attended junior high school in Scotland and Hong Kong and high school in Kentucky. She is of Cuban and Icelandic descent and spoke only Spanish before kindergarten. After high school, Brito moved to St. Louis to pursue a business degree at the Washington University in St. Louis. Once she graduated from college, she remained in St. Louis and launched her career in comedy. Though she was politically active in college with the student and labor rights movement, her comedy was not explicitly political at first. Eventually, she moved to Oakland specifically for the city's comedy scene and reputation for fostering progressive comics. It was in Oakland that she honed her focus on identity politics and decided to take more risks in her act, such as adopting her signature androgynous style.

Shortly after moving to the Bay Area around 2008, Brito met comic W. Kamau Bell. Bell became a mentor to Brito, taking her under his wing as his "comedy daughter". In 2010, she joined Bell and fellow comic Nato Green in Laughter Against the Machine, a political comedy tour that was subsequently made into a documentary set to premiere in 2014. In 2012, Bell invited Brito to join the writing staff of his new FX series Totally Biased with W. Kamau Bell. In addition to writing on the series, Brito frequently appeared on air in pieces covering topics like Miss Fire Island, LGBTQ athletes, and the "war on women".

In 2019, Brito joined the comedy web television series One Day at a Time as both a writer and an actor. She had a small part in Amy Poehler's feature-film directorial debut, Wine Country. In May 2019, Brito performed as a stand-up comedian on Late Night with Seth Meyers. She is a writer on the animated comedy series Bless the Harts, starring Maya Rudolph and Kristen Wiig. In the Peacock/Netflix musical comedy series Girls5eva, she plays Caroline, the ex-wife of Gloria (played by her real-life wife, Paula Pell). She also wrote for the series in the third season.

== Comedy style ==
Her colleague and longtime friend W. Kamau Bell describes Brito as "a sarcastic, snarky smart bomb of comedy funk straight from the 80s". Brito is often placed within the alternative comedy scene and tends to focus on issues of gender, race, and sexuality. She often derives humor from her half-Cuban background and her childhood fixation on worrying about being the Antichrist. She is also known for her sartorial choices and frequent donning of neckties. An article written by feminist website Feministing, says her comedy is "a punch in the face of convention and offers a refreshing departure from the straight, white, male narrative that usually relies on tired tropes and stereotypes."

== Reception ==
Brito won the SF Women's Comedy Competition in 2009 and the Silver Nail Award from local SF bcasting network Rooftop Comedy. She was also praised by 7×7 magazine as "one of SF's more daring voices" and as one of "the 7 funniest people in town". She was named the 2011 "Best Comedian with a Messag" by the East Bay Express. At the start of the 2013 season, The A.V. Club wrote in one review of Totally Biased, "Also: more Janine Brito, please. Totally Biased needs so much more of her".

== Personal life ==
Brito got engaged to Saturday Night Live alum Paula Pell in August 2018. They were married on November 13, 2020.
