= Sam Means (writer) =

American comedy writer

Sam Means is an American comedy writer. He won three Emmy awards for his work on The Daily Show with Jon Stewart, and wrote for both 30 Rock and Parks and Recreation on NBC as well as Unbreakable Kimmy Schmidt, Great News, Girls5eva, and for Tina Fey and Amy Poehler when they hosted The Golden Globes. Together with Robert Carlock, he created the Netflix animated show, Mulligan and the NBC series The Fall and Rise of Reggie Dinkins, for which he also co-wrote the episodes "Pilot", "You May Hug Your Hero", and "A Real Cinderello Story".

Means received his A.B. from Dartmouth College, and an M.Phil. in philosophy from King's College, Cambridge. He began his career as a cartoonist for The New Yorker and as a contributing writer for The Onion.
