= Meredith Scardino =

American screenwriter and producer

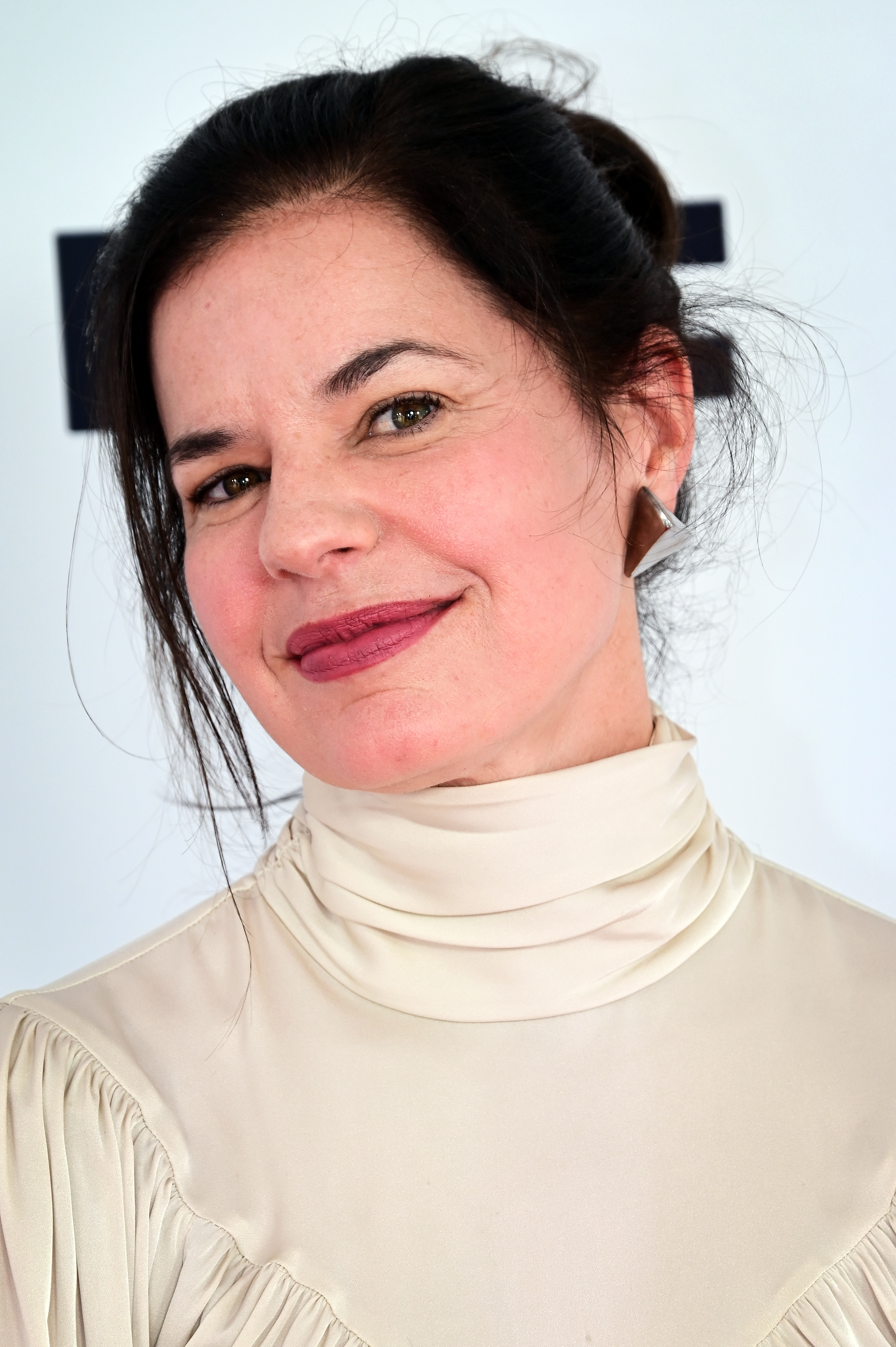
- Scardino in 2026
- Education: Cornell University (BFA); Parsons School of Design (MFA)
- Occupations: Screenwriter, producer

Meredith Scardino is an American screenwriter, showrunner and producer. She has worked as a writer for several television comedies, including Colbert Report, Unbreakable Kimmy Schmidt, Mr. Mayor, and The Fall and Rise of Reggie Dinkins. She is the creator of the Peacock/Netflix original series Girls5eva.

== Early life ==
Scardino grew up in Villanova, a suburb of Philadelphia. As a four-year-old, she sometimes appeared on a local show called The Al Alberts Showcase. She graduated from Radnor High School in 1994 before earning a Bachelor of Fine Arts from Cornell University in 1998.

Scardino studied painting at Parsons School of Design and graduated with a master's degree in fine arts.

== Career ==
Scardino began her career as an animator before transitioning into writing. Her first writing job was in 2004 on the VH1 comedy series Best Week Ever. She went on to write for the Late Show with David Letterman from 2005 to 2007, where she was the sole female writer. She left Letterman to become a writer for The Colbert Report, and was part of the writing team that won an Emmy Award for "Outstanding Writing for a Variety, Music, or Comedy Program" in 2008. She went on to write for Colbert's new show, The Late Show with Stephen Colbert, and became a consulting producer for its 2016 launch.

In 2015, Scardino left The Late Show with Stephen Colbert to join the writing staff of Robert Carlock's and Tina Fey's Netflix original series Unbreakable Kimmy Schmidt, which she co-executive-produced for its final two seasons.

Scardino's comedy series Girls5eva premiered in 2021, produced by Tina Fey and Robert Carlock. It ran for two seasons on Peacock and then was picked up for a third season by Netflix.

She has also written for Saturday Night Live, At Home with Amy Sedaris, The Daily Show, Human Giant and the 72nd Primetime Emmy Awards, and the The Fall and Rise of Reggie Dinkins episodes "Put It on Your Cabbage!" and "Mischief and Memories".

== Personal life ==
Scardino lives in New York City and has one son.
