= David Miner (television producer) =

American television producer (born 1969)

- Born: November 15, 1969 (age 56); New York City, U.S.
- Education: Skidmore College
- Occupations: Talent manager, television producer
- Spouse: Jennifer Weis (m. 1994)

David Miner (born November 15, 1969) is an American television producer and talent manager who is known for his work as an executive producer on 30 Rock, Parks and Recreation, Brooklyn Nine-Nine, Master of None and Unbreakable Kimmy Schmidt.

== Early life ==
Miner attended Skidmore College where in 1988 he founded the school's first improvisational comedy group and in 1990 created and produced the National College Comedy Festival, an ongoing annual event for over 25 years. He also worked as a summer intern at The Second City in Chicago.

== Career ==
Upon graduation, Miner returned to New York where he soon became a Producer and company member with the city's longest running improvisational theater, Chicago City Limits. In 1995 he relocated to Los Angeles to join talent management and production firm 3 Arts Entertainment, where he rose to Partner. Miner is the manager of Tina Fey.

== Awards and nominations ==
In addition to winning three Emmy Awards for Outstanding Comedy Series for producing 30 Rock, Miner has received 16 additional Emmy nominations as well as Golden Globe and Peabody Awards.

== Filmography ==
- Greetings from Tucson (2003)
- The Tracy Morgan Show (2003–2004)
- Carpoolers (2007)
- Human Giant (2007–2008)
- 30 Rock (2006–2013)
- Parks and Recreation (2009–2015, 2020)
- Brooklyn Nine-Nine (2013–2021)
- Mulaney (2014)
- Master of None (2015–2021)
- Unbreakable Kimmy Schmidt (2015–2019)
- The Good Place (2016–2020)
- Great News (2017–2018)
- Abby's (2019)
- Tacoma FD (2019–2023)
- Sunnyside (2019)
- Never Have I Ever (2019–2023)
- Mr. Mayor (2021–2022)
- Rutherford Falls (2021-2022)
- Girls5eva (2021-present)
- Hacks (2021-present)
- Mulligan (2023-present)
- Primo (2023)
- A Man on the Inside (2024-present)
