= Eric Gurian =

American film producer

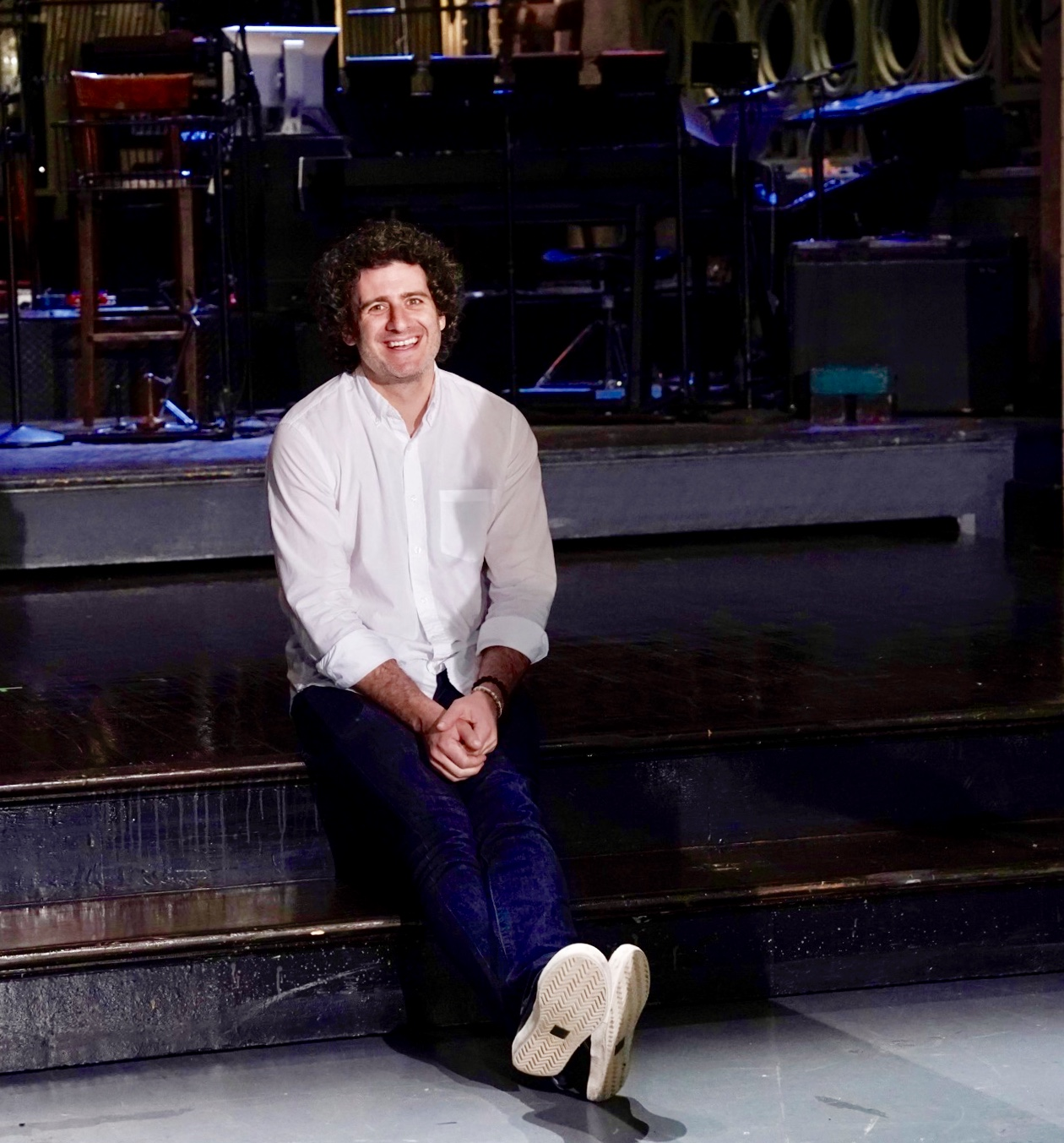
- Eric Gurian at Saturday Night Live 2018
- Born: December 10; West Caldwell, New Jersey
- Education: Syracuse University
- Occupations: Television/Film producer, director, and writer
- Years active: 2004–present
- Spouse: Victoria Parker
- Children: George Gurian

Eric Andrew Gurian is an American film and television producer, director and writer. He is the President of Tina Fey's production company Little Stranger.

== Early life ==
Gurian grew up in West Caldwell, NJ the son of Dr. David Gurian, optician and audiologist, and Marcia Gurian, renowned speech pathologist and co-founder of Ethan and The Bean, a coffee shop employing persons with Intellectual and Developmental Disabilities. He has a brother, Dr. Michael Gurian, a pediatric radiologist who practices in Orlando, Fl.

Gurian attended James Caldwell High School and then the S. I. Newhouse School of Public Communications at Syracuse University.

== Career ==
Upon graduation from Syracuse, Gurian began his career as an NBC page in New York City. After being hired out of the Page Program, Gurian worked at Saturday Night Live where he initially met Tina Fey.

His credits include 30 Rock, Unbreakable Kimmy Schmidt, Girls5eva, The Four Seasons, Golden Globe Awards, Great News, Saturday Night Live, Sisters, Whiskey Tango Foxtrot, Busy Tonight, and Baby Mama, and many more.

== Awards ==
Gurian is a sixteen-time Emmy nominated producer, two-time Producers Guild Award winner and a member of the 30 Rock team which was honored with the Peabody Award in 2007.

== Charitable work ==
Gurian is politically active and has supported many philanthropies including the Arnold Palmer Children's Hospital, University Settlement House, and the ACLU.

On March 31, 2017 he founded Stand For Rights: A Benefit for the ACLU as a telethon for Facebook Live. The benefit drew talent including Tom Hanks, Usher, Norah Jones, Tina Fey, Alec Baldwin, and more. It received an Emmy nomination, which was the first of its kind for Facebook.

Gurian is also known to have worked on humanitarian efforts in several countries.
