= Jeff Richmond =

American composer and producer (born 1961)

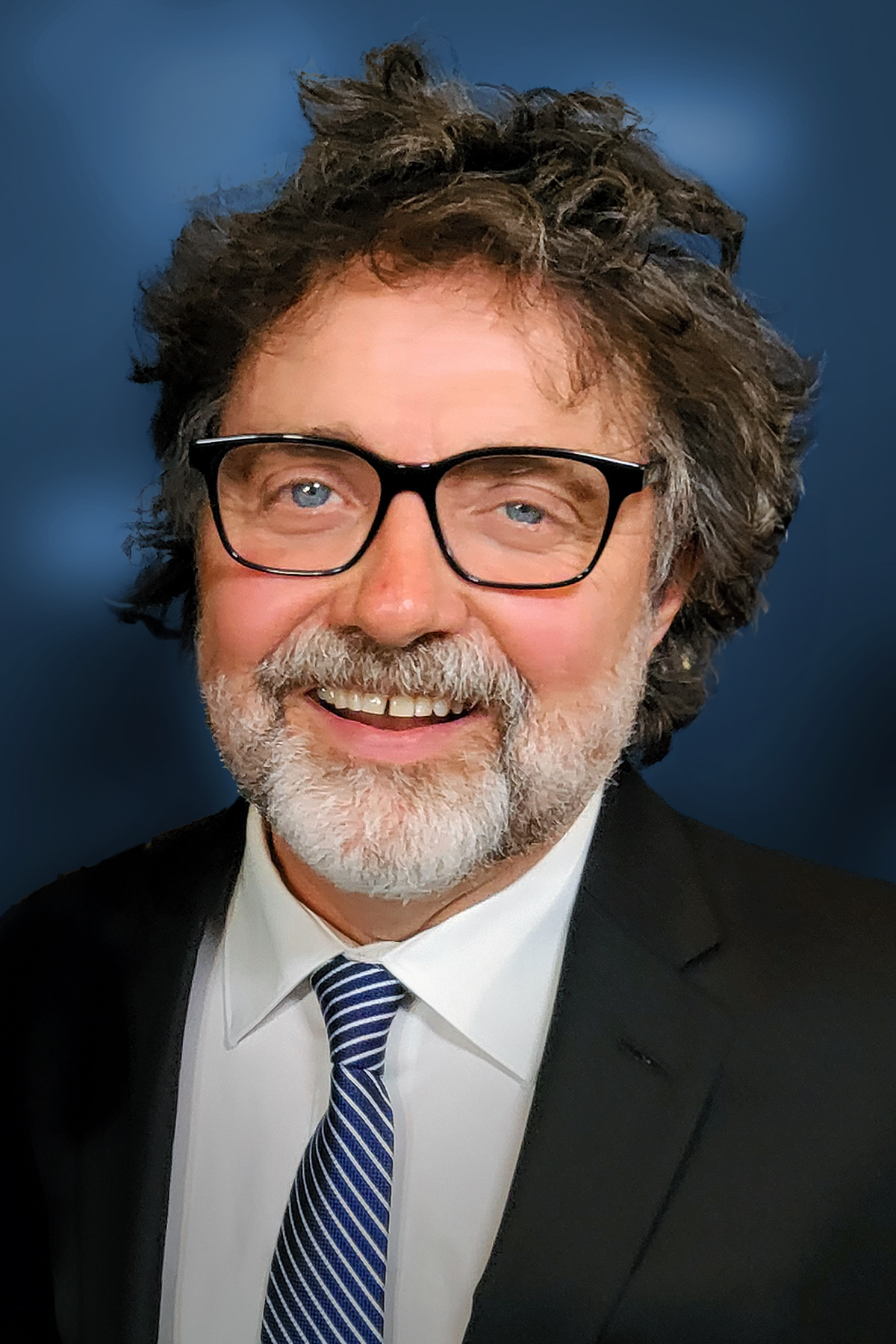
- Richmond in 2022
- Born: Jeffrey Wayne Richmond; January 7, 1961 (age 65); Garrettsville, Ohio, U.S.
- Occupations: Composer; producer; director; comedian
- Years active: 2004–present
- Spouse: Tina Fey (m. 2001)
- Children: 2

Jeffrey Wayne Richmond (born January 7, 1961) is an American composer, comedian, producer, and director. He composed the music for, and directed multiple episodes of 30 Rock, a sitcom created by and starring his wife, Tina Fey. He also executive produced and composed the music for Unbreakable Kimmy Schmidt, another sitcom created by Fey.

== Early life and education ==
Jeffrey Wayne Richmond grew up in Portage County, Ohio, and graduated in 1979 from James A. Garfield High School in Garrettsville, where he won the John Philip Sousa award and where his mother still lives. He also played a key part in the creation of the Garrettsville Community Players, directing, choreographing, and lending his creative and artistic vision to many of its shows in its beginning.

He attended Kent State University in Kent, Ohio in the early 1980s, where he co-authored a number of musicals including his acclaimed Lobo-A-Go-Go, and wrote a musical score to William Shakespeare's Othello.

== Career ==
Richmond worked at The Second City and Child's Play Touring Theatre before he became music director for the late-night television variety show Saturday Night Live. Richmond left SNL in 2006 to produce and compose music for the situation comedy 30 Rock. Richmond has also appeared as an extra on various occasions on 30 Rock, as the character Alfonso Disparioso; and, beginning in 2010, he directed five episodes: "Argus", "Plan B", "The Ballad of Kenneth Parcell", "Today You Are a Man", and "A Goon's Deed in a Weary World".

In 2008, he composed the score to the film Baby Mama, which starred Tina Fey and Amy Poehler.

Richmond has also appeared in a recurring role on Late Night with Conan O'Brien as the short character "Russian Hat Guy".

He wrote music for the Broadway stage adaptation of Mean Girls, which had its out-of-town Broadway tryout in Washington, DC. The musical began previews on Broadway March 12, 2018, and opened officially on Broadway on April 8, 2018. Mean Girls premiered on London's West End in June 2024.

== Recognition and awards ==
Richmond has won three Emmy awards for his production of the first three seasons of 30 Rock. He has also been nominated for an Emmy for his composition of 30 Rock's theme song. He was nominated for the Tony Award for Best Original Score in 2018 for Mean Girls.

He is a recipient of the Child's Play Touring Theatre 2012 Victor Award.

== Personal life ==
Richmond is married to Tina Fey. They met while working at The Second City and dated for seven years before marrying on June 3, 2001. They have two daughters.

== Works ==
=== Television ===
Year	Title	Credited as					Role	Network	Notes
Year	Title	Producer	Director	Writer	Composer	Actor	Role	Network	Notes
2005–2018	Saturday Night Live				Yes (2)	Yes (2)	Singer	NBC	
2006–2013	30 Rock	Yes	Yes (5)		Yes	Yes (8)	Alfonso Disparioso	NBC	
2013	Inside the Actors Studio					Yes (1)	Self	NBC	
2015	Saturday Night Live: 40th Anniversary Special			Yes				NBC	Television special
2015–2019	Unbreakable Kimmy Schmidt	Yes	Yes (4)		Yes	Yes (1)	Pianist	Netflix	
2016	Maya & Marty				Yes			NBC	
2017–2018	Great News		Yes (1)		Yes			NBC	
2018	Entertainment Tonight					Yes (1)	Self	CBS	
2018	CBS News Sunday Morning					Yes (1)	Self	CBS	
2018	TODAY					Yes (1)	Self	NBC	
2018	Extra				Yes (1)		Self	Warner Bros. Domestic Television Distribution	
2020	Unbreakable Kimmy Schmidt: Kimmy vs The Reverend	Yes			Yes			Netflix	Television film
2020	30 Rock: A One-Time Special				Yes	Yes	Self	NBC	Television special
2021–2022	Mr. Mayor	Yes			Yes			NBC	
2021–2024	Girls5eva	Yes			Yes			Peacock/Netflix	
2023–present	Mulligan				Yes			Netflix	

=== Film ===
Year	Title	Producer	Composer	Actor	Role	Notes
2008	Baby Mama		Yes			
2015	Sisters	Yes				
2015	The Parker Tribe		Yes	Yes	Self (Special Thanks)	Short Film
2015	Hell and Back			Yes	Self (Special Thanks)	
2016	Whiskey Tango Foxtrot	Yes				
2024	Mean Girls		Yes			

=== Stage ===
Year	Title	Role	Music	Lyrics	Notes
2016	Fully Committed	Music	Jeff Richmond	—N/a	Play
2018	Mean Girls	Music	Jeff Richmond	Nell Benjamin	
2023	Hello, Dolly!	Horace Vandergelder	Jerry Herman	Herman	

=== Web ===
Year	Title	Role	Notes
2020	Stars in the House	Self	
