= Parry Gripp discography =

Albums released by Parry Gripp

Parry Gripp albums discography
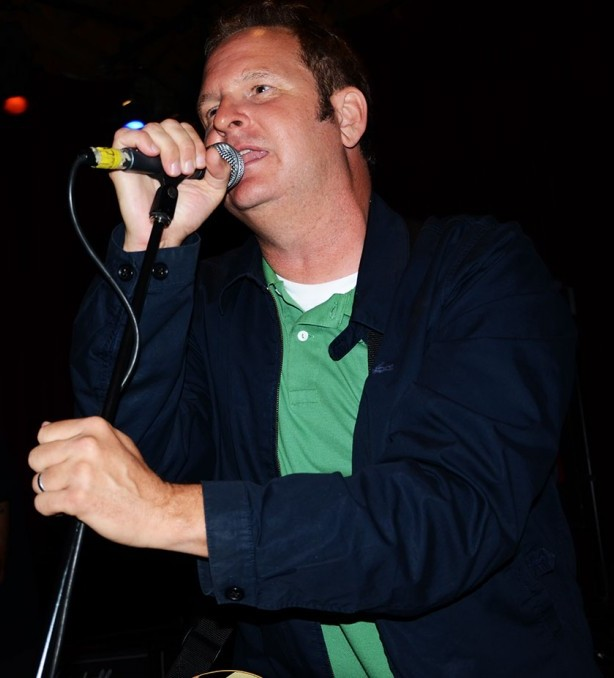
- Parry Gripp performing with Nerf Herder in 2012
- Studio albums: 3
- EPs: 3
- Soundtrack albums: 1
- Compilation albums: 5
- Collaborative albums: 1
- Reissues: 1
- Mixtapes: 1

As a solo artist, American singer-songwriter Parry Gripp has released three original studio albums, one reissue, one collaborative studio album, five compilation albums, one soundtrack album, one mixtape, and three extended plays (EPs). Known for his novelty songs, he became an internet sensation after Nathan Mazur's animated music video for "Do You Like Waffles?" went viral.

Gripp's career began as the lead vocalist and guitarist of Nerf Herder. He released his first solo album, For Those About to Shop, We Salute You (2005), during the hiatus of Nerf Herder. With 51 tracks under a minute long, it is a concept album of commercial jingles. Gripp's second solo album, Do You Like Waffles? (2008), was released the same year as a collaboration with the Hallmark Cards characters Hoops & Yoyo, focusing exclusively on food. His third solo album and first christmas album, Jingle Burgers, was released in 2020.

== Studio albums ==
List of solo studio albums, with details
Title	Studio album details
For Those About to Shop, We Salute You	Released: May 10, 2005; Label: Oglio; Format: CD
Do You Like Waffles?	Released: September 23, 2008; Label: Oglio; Format: CD, digital download
Jingle Burgers – A Parry Gripp Christmas Album	Released: November 13, 2020; Label: Oglio; Format: CD, digital download, streaming

=== Reissues ===
List of re-released studio albums, with details
Title	Album details
For Kids About to Rock	Released: June 4, 2021; Label: Oglio; Format: CD, LP, digital download, streaming

=== Collaborative albums ===
List of collaborative studio albums, with details
Title	Album details
One Donut a Day! (with Hoops & Yoyo)	Released: 2008; Label: Oglio; Format: CD

== Compilation albums ==
List of compilation albums, with details
Title	Album details
Fuzzy Fuzzy Cute Cute, Vol. 1	Released: July 13, 2010; Label: Oglio; Format: Digital download, streaming
Parry Gripp Mega-Party (2008–2012)	Released: July 18, 2013; Label: Oglio/self-released; Format: CD, 2×LP, Digital download, streaming
Mini-Party	Released: July 3, 2022; Label: self-released; Format: Digital download, streaming
A Bunch of Random Parry Gripp Songs	Released: July 11, 2022; Label: self-released; Format: Digital download, streaming
The Raining Tacos Saga	Released: December 6, 2024; Label: Parry Gripp Music (digital), Oglio (physical); Format: Digital download, streaming, CD, LP

== Soundtrack albums ==
Title	Album details
Waffles + Mochi's Restaurant: Season 1 (Soundtrack from the Netflix Series) (with Waffles + Mochi Cast and Fromage 5)	Released: October 14, 2022; Label: Netflix Music; Format: Digital download, streaming

== Mixtapes ==
List of mixtapes, with details
Title	Details
Hoagiefest (with Wawa)	Released: 2009–2017; Label: Wawa; Format: Digital download

== Extended plays ==
List of extended plays, with details and selected chart positions
Title	EP Details	Peaks
Title	EP Details	THA
Chip Rok, Vol. 1	Released: June 24, 2011; Label: self-released; Format: Digital download, streaming	—
Oh Potato Dog	Released: October 10, 2019; Label: self-released; Format: Digital download, streaming	93
Sunny the Rat	Released: June 21, 2020; Label: self-released; Format: Digital download, streaming	—
"—" denotes a recording that did not chart or was not released in that territory.

== See also ==
- Nerf Herder discography
