= Justin Fisher (musician) =

American born bassist

- Born: April 11, 1970 (age 56)
- Origin: Mansfield, Connecticut, U.S
- Genres: Alternative
- Occupation: Musician
- Instruments: Bass, Guitar, Keyboards, Vocals
- Years active: 1987–present

Justin Fisher is an American musician most well known for being the bassist in Nerf Herder, touring bassist for The Rentals and lead singer for Psoma. Fisher also co-founded Rivers Cuomo's second band Avant Garde.

Fisher played guitar and was the backing vocalist for Shufflepuck who were signed to Interscope records in the 1990s.

Fisher joined Nerf Herder in 1999 and played bass and keywords on the albums How To Meet Girls, My EP, American Cheese. During this period, Fisher was the touring bassist for The Rentals. In 2003 and 2004, Fisher also contributed vocals on Matt Sharp's solo album and EP.

Fisher is also the primary songwriter, lead vocalist and guitarist in the band Psoma who have released two albums and one EP.

Fisher played bass on the 2013 AM Radio album Shine and joined the new lineup of Ridel High playing bass. He has been releasing solo songs via his own SoundCloud account.
