= Rockingham =

Rockingham may refer to:

== People ==
- Marquess of Rockingham, a British title of nobility whose holders included:
  - Charles Watson-Wentworth, 2nd Marquess of Rockingham (1730–1782), Prime Minister of Great Britain

== Places ==
=== Australia ===
- City of Rockingham
  - Rockingham, Western Australia
  - East Rockingham, Western Australia
  - Electoral district of Rockingham, a State Electoral District in Western Australia
- Rockingham Bay, Queensland

=== Canada ===
- Rockingham, Nova Scotia
  - École Rockingham School, an elementary school in Halifax, Nova Scotia
- Rockingham, community in Brudenell, Lyndoch and Raglan Township, Ontario

=== Ireland ===
- Rockingham Estate, a large country house and estate in Boyle, County Roscommon

=== United Kingdom ===
- Rockingham, Northamptonshire, England
  - Rockingham Castle
  - Rockingham Forest
  - Rockingham Motor Speedway

=== United States ===
- Rockingham, Georgia
- Rockingham, Missouri
- Rockingham, New Jersey, an unincorporated community
  - Rockingham (house), an historic house in Rockingham, NJ
- Rockingham, North Carolina, in Richmond County
  - Rockingham Speedway ("The Rock"), a NASCAR track located outside of Rockingham, NC
- Rockingham, Vermont
- Rockingham Avenue, Brentwood, Los Angeles, CA; the location of O.J. Simpson's former estate
- Rockingham County, New Hampshire
  - Rockingham Park, horse racing and former motor racing track in Salem, New Hampshire
- Rockingham County, North Carolina
- Rockingham County, Virginia
- Rockingham Township, Iowa

== Other uses ==
- Rockingham (album), an album by the band Nerf Herder
- Rockingham (horse), a British Thoroughbred racehorse
- Rockingham ministry (disambiguation), British governments led by Lord Rockingham
- Operation Rockingham, a British government codename relating to operations with regard to Iraq
- Rockingham Pottery, a 19th-century Yorkshire manufacturer of porcelain that benefitted from the patronage of the descendants of the Marquesses of Rockingham
- USS Rockingham (APA-229), United States' navy ship
