= Steve Coulter (disambiguation) =

Steve Coulter is a former NASCAR team owner.

Steve Coulter may also refer to

- Steve Coulter (musician), American member of the band Tsar
- Stephen Coulter (born 1914), English novelist and journalist
- Steve Coulter (born 1960), American actor
- Steve Colter (born 1962), American former professional basketball player
- Steven Coulter (born 1984), American actor
