= Allie Goertz =

American comedian and singer-songwriter (born 1991)

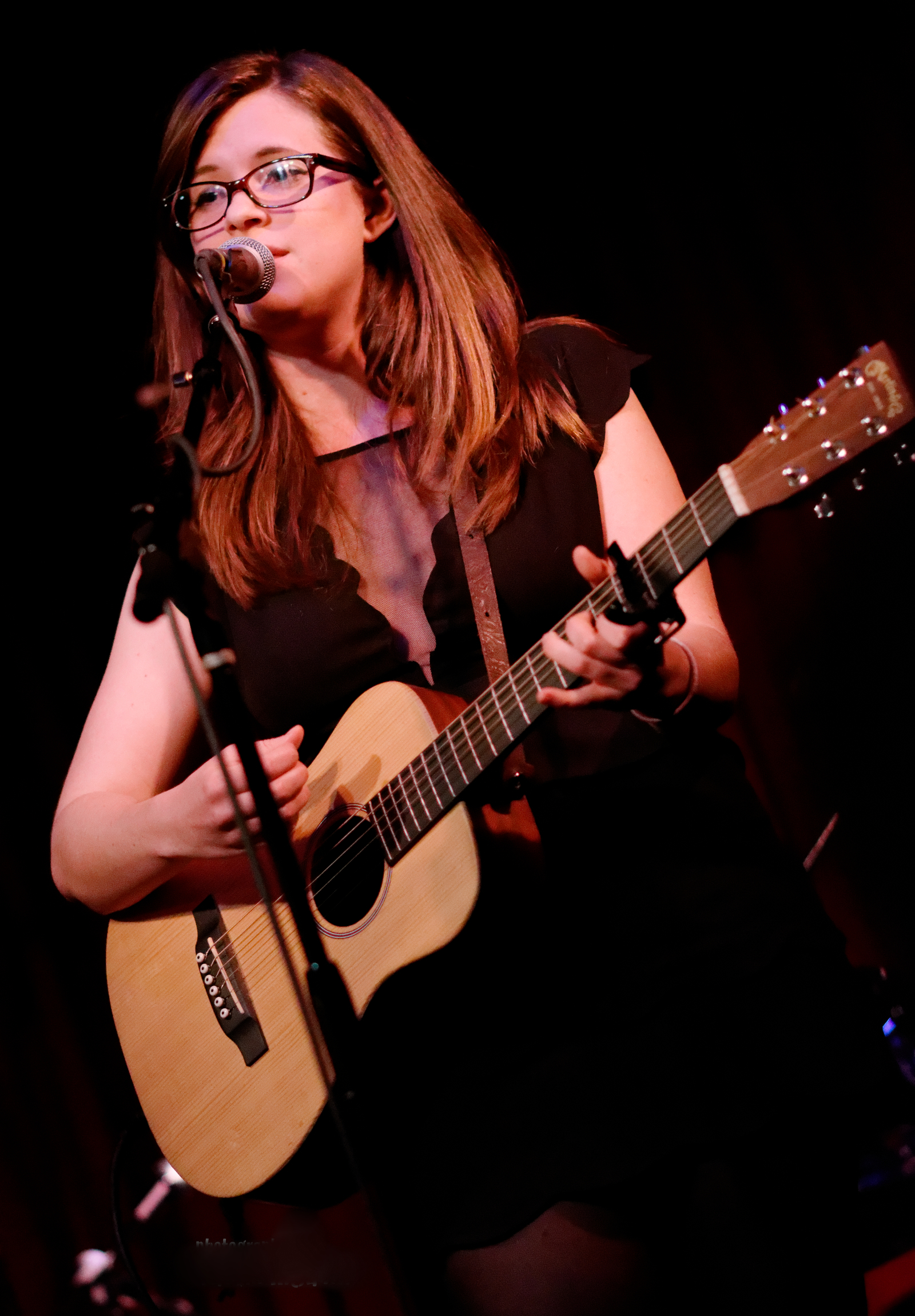
- Goertz in 2013

Background information
- Born: Allison Beth Goertz; March 2, 1991 (age 35); Long Beach, California, US
- Genres: Comedy
- Occupations: Comedy musician; writer; YouTuber; podcaster
- Instruments: Guitar; vocals
- Years active: 2015–present

Allison Beth Goertz (born March 2, 1991) is an American comedy musician, writer and former editor for Mad magazine. Goertz is known for her satirical songs based on various pop culture topics.

== Early life ==
Goertz grew up in Long Beach, California, the daughter of an elementary school teacher mother and a web graphic designer father.

== Career ==
In December 2015, Goertz released a concept album based on the Adult Swim series Rick and Morty, Sad Dance Songs, with the album's cover emulating the animation and logo of the series. The album was made possible through Kickstarter. She is co-host, along with Julia Prescott, of Everything's Coming Up Simpsons (formerly Everything's Coming Up Podcast), a podcast dedicated to The Simpsons.

Subjects of her songs have included the film The Room, the character Milhouse from the television show The Simpsons, and the game Dungeons & Dragons. Her style has been compared to that of Bo Burnham.

== Affiliations and memberships ==
Goertz has served as a social media producer for shows including @midnight for Comedy Central. In 2018, Goertz became an editor at Mad magazine, leaving in June 2019, midway through production of issue #9.

She is also a canvasser for the Democratic Socialists of America.

== In popular culture ==
The band Nerf Herder released a song entitled "Allie Goertz" on their 2016 album Rockingham.
