= Kevin Ridel =

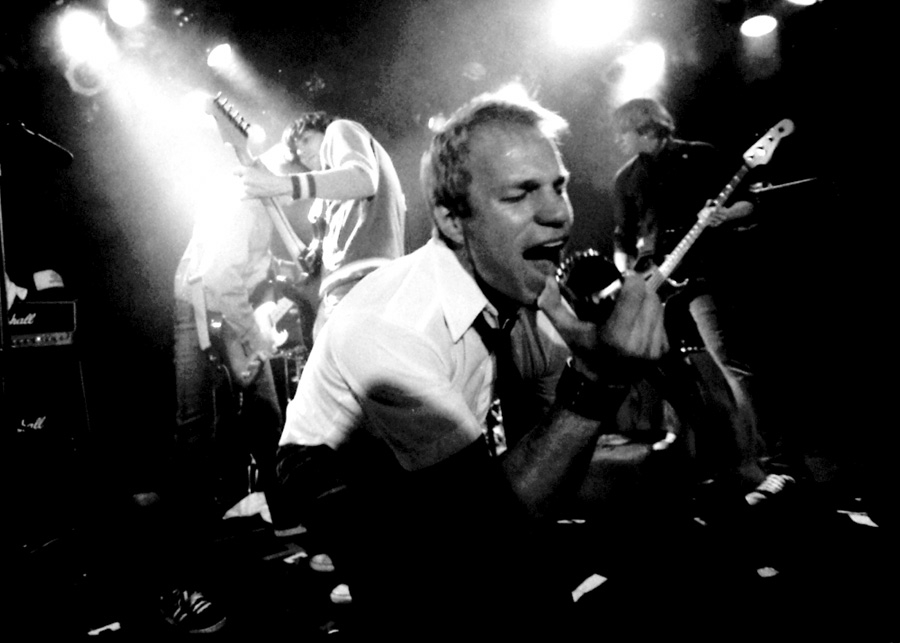

Background information
- Born: Kevin Ridel; 1969; Connecticut
- Genres: Alternative
- Occupations: Musician, singer-songwriter, guitarist
- Instruments: Vocals, bass, guitar, keyboard
- Website: kevinridel.com

Kevin Ridel is an American musician and songwriter most notable for being the lead singer and primary songwriter of '90s power pop band Ridel High (A&M Records) and 2000s alternative rock band AM Radio (Elektra Records).

== Early life and influences ==
At age 14, Ridel was playing in bands in Connecticut. In 1989 he moved from Connecticut to Los Angeles to pursue a career as a rock singer and songwriter.

== Career ==
=== Bands ===
Ridel's first band was the '80s hair metal band Avant Garde, formed with Rivers Cuomo (who would later form the band Weezer). Ridel was the lead singer. Avant Garde, later renamed Zoom, were active from 1985 to 1989.

After Avant Garde ended Ridel moved to Los Angeles where he started the band Lunchbox.

Ridel has made music with the Los Angeles bands Ridel High (A&M Records), Peel (Beyond Music) and AM Radio (Elektra Records).

=== Ridel High ===
In 1995 Ridel formed the band Ridel High, which released a 2 track vinyl single on Morpheus Records in 1995. The band then released the album Hi Scores, and then Emotional Rollercoaster (1997) both with Joey Cape's label My Records. During this time the band played shows around LA with such bands as That Dog, Size 14, Summercamp. Emotional Rollercoaster rereleased by A&M Records in 1998, where it was not successful. In 1999 the band split up, releasing the album Recycle Bin containing song that had been recorded for their 3rd album.

After the split of Ridel High, Ridel went on to form Peel with Ridel High guitarist Steve LeRoy. Leroy was later replaced as guitarist by Matt Fuller. Ridel reformed Ridel High with Fuller in 2013. The band performed live in 2013 and 2014 on the Boozacarooza Cruise with Nerf Herder.

=== AM Radio ===
In 2001 Ridel formed AM Radio. Cuomo was AM Radio's manager, and the band toured the United States and Japan with Cuomo's band Weezer. In 2001 after signing to Elektra records AM Radio released the album Radioactive. The band had recorded tracks for a 3rd album for Elektra which was not released. These tracks would appear on the 2005 album "Reactive".

Ridel's band AM Radio have toured the US, Canada and Japan, supporting the bands Weezer, Third Eye Blind, Eve 6, Rooney, Ben Kweller and The Psychedelic Furs. Their song "I Just Wanna Be Loved" was featured on the Smallville soundtrack – Talon Mix, and also placed on an episode. Another song "Taken for a Ride" was featured on EA Sports Madden NFL 2004, placed on an episode of One Tree Hill, and used on a television trailer for FOX feature film The Girl Next Door. The song "Pretty Stupid", was featured on the DVD for Wonderfalls.

AM Radio's album Reactive was released on Fiveman Army (FAEC Inc.). The band was signed with Sony Music Publishing, and released the album Shine in 2013.

=== Solo ===
Ridel sang on two songs on the video game Elite Beat Agents, and covered The Kinks' song "You Really Got Me" for a national Japanese television ad for Soft Bank.

== Bands ==
- AM Radio
- Ridel High
- Peel
- Avant Garde

=== Albums ===
Album information
Peel by Peel
- Released: 1999
AM Radio by AM Radio
- Released: 2001
Radioactive by AM Radio
- Released: 2003
Reactive by AM Radio
- Released: 2007
Bigger Better Bolder Brighter by AM Radio
- Released: 2009
Shine by AM Radio
- Released: 2013
Emotional Rollercoaster by Ridel High
- Released: 1998
High Scores by Ridel High
- Released: 1997
Recycle bin by Ridel High
- Released: 1999
