= Peel (California band) =

- Origin: Los Angeles, California, U.S.
- Genres: Power pop, alternative rock
- Years active: 1999–2001
- Label: Beyond Music
- Spinoffs: AM Radio
- Spinoff of: Tsar; Avant Garde; Lunchbox; Ridel High
- Past members: Kevin Ridel; Steve Coulter; Steve LeRoy; Matt Fuller

Peel was an American rock band formed by musician Kevin Ridel in 1999 following the breakup of Ridel High. Ridel recruited Steve LeRoy of Ridel High on guitar, Matt Fuller later replaced Steve LeRoy on guitar and finally Joe Higgins (AM Radio) on drums. Peel recorded and released one album titled Blindside produced by Face to Face singer Trever Keith, track 6 on the album "Facelift" was previously released as a Ridel High song on the 2000 compilation CD Happy Meals 2 Blindside was recorded in tribute Kevin's dad, Gerald “Jerry” Ridel.

Peel were active until 2001, Kevin Ridel then took Joe Higgins with him and went on to form AM Radio in 2001 who remain active until this very day.

== Discography ==
Peels only album was Blindside, recorded in 1999.

=== Blindside - 1999 ===
1. Set 'em Up 2:44
2. Summer Song 3:36
3. Grounded 3:56
4. Birthday Present 3:56
5. Gel 4:47
6. Facelift 2:21
7. Overlife 4:39
8. Day To Day 4:44
9. Nightmares 3:25
10. Angel On My Shoulder 2:33
11. Silence Is Deadly 3:56
12. Blindside 3:07

== Personnel ==
Band members

1999–2001 lineup

- Kevin Ridel – bass, lead vocals
- Steve LeRoy – guitar
- Steve Coulter - drums
- Matt Fuller (2001) - guitar
