= Ridel High =

American power pop band

- Origin: Los Angeles, California, U.S.
- Genres: Power pop
- Years active: 1995–1999; 2013–present
- Label: A&M Records (1998); My Records (1997)
- Spinoffs: Peel; AM Radio; Tsar
- Spinoff of: Avant Garde; Lunchbox
- Members: Kevin Ridel; Steve Coulter; Justin Fisher; Marko DeSantis; Matt Fuller
- Past members: Steve LeRoy
- Website: Official Facebook Page

Ridel High are a mid 1990s American power pop band formed in Los Angeles by lead singer and songwriter Kevin Ridel. Ridel was the lead singer for Avant Garde, which featured Rivers Cuomo of Weezer.

Ridel High was named in tribute to both Ridel and the school featured in the movie Grease. The band were a part of the 1990s LA scene, playing with such bands as That Dog, Chopper One, Supersport 2000, Size 14, Summercamp, and Silver Jet.

The band formed in 1995 from the remnants of Ridel's former band Lunchbox. Lunchbox songs such as "Winona Ryder" and "As If The Sky Were On Fire" went on to become Ridel High songs. Ridel High's first album was Hi-Scores, which was produced by Lagwagon singer Joey Cape and released by independent label My Records in 1997.

In 1998, Ridel High signed to major label A&M Records, who reissued and retitled Hi-Scores as Emotional Rollercoaster. The album's only single was "Self Destructive," whose music video was directed by Devo member Gerald Casale. Coincidentally, Ridel High covered the Devo song "Blockhead" for the 1997 tribute album We are Not Devo.

After the band split in 1999, they self released Recycle Bin, which featured previously unreleased songs and songs that were recorded for their third album. Some of these songs such as "Winona Ryder" and "As If The Sky Were On Fire" had started out as Lunchbox songs, the band Kevin Ridel started before Ridel High were formed.

== 1999–2013 ==
Kevin Ridel went on to form Peel in 1999 with Steve LeRoy on guitar (later Matt Fuller) and Joe Higgins (AM Radio) on drums who released one album titled 'Blindside' produced by Face to Face singer Trever Keith, Peel were active until 2001.

In 2001, Kevin Ridel then formed AM Radio, who were briefly managed by Rivers Cuomo. The band released their fifth album Shine in 2013, Steve Coulter joined Tsar, and Steve LeRoy took a hiatus from the music industry but continued to live and work in the LA area.

== Reformation in 2013 ==
As of 2013, Ridel High reformed with a new lineup featuring original members Kevin Ridel on lead vocals and Steve Coulter on drums, joined by new additions Justin Fisher (Shufflepuck, Psoma, Nerf Herder, The Rentals) on bass, Marko DeSantis (Sugarcult, Bad Astronaut) on guitar, and Matt Fuller (AM Radio, Plastiscene, Bow Wow Wow) on guitar.

The band played their first show in over 15 years at Aveson June Jubilee in Alta Dena, California, June 2, 2013.

In 2014, the band played the annual Boozacarooza Cruise, which featured bands such as Nerf Herder and Fizzy Bangers. The band also started a SoundCloud page to coincide with their reformation posting rare B sides and Demos.

== Discography ==
=== Hi-Scores - 1997 My Records / Emotional Rollercoaster – 1998 A&M Records ===
Source:

== Track listing ==
All lyrics are written by Ridel High.

No.	Title	Music	Length
1.	"Self Destructive"	Ridel	3:06
2.	"Monsters Under Your Bed"	Ridel	2:35
3.	"180"	Ridel	2:58
4.	"Look At Me Now"	Ridel	3:45
5.	"Mouthful Of You"	Ridel	3:41
6.	"Another Song About Lying"	LeRoy	3:48
7.	"As If The Sky Were On Fire"	Ridel	3:22
8.	"Disqualified"	Ridel	3:39
9.	"Places People Hide Their Money"	Ridel	2:53
10.	"Her Perspective From My Perspective"	Ridel	2:25
11.	"Battleship Gray"	Ridel	3:21
12.	"Galaxy Girl"	Ridel	4:06
13.	"Hello"	Ridel	3:30

=== Recycle Bin - 1999 Self Released ===
- 1. intro 0:08
- 2. Winona Ryder 3:26
- 3. Blue 3:02
- 4. Goodbye Nate 3:44
- 5. Mindblower 1:35
- 6. Devil Angel 4:40
- 7. Motorboat 2:55
- 8. Breaking Up 2:50
- 9. Pivot 3:13
- 10. Second Skin 5:36
- 11. Go getter 2:05
- 12. #1 3:47
- 13. You Are Mine 4:11
- 14. Defenseless 2:28
- 15. Coming of Age 2:01
- 16. Headliner 3:01
- 17. Look at me Now 3:23
- 18. Battleship Gray 3:37
- 19. Robot (live) 2:44
- 20. interview (N0ise Pollution) 4:26
- 21. message from Michino and Yoko 0:08

=== Mouthful of You b/w Winona Ryder - 1995 on Morpheus Records ===
- A. Mouthful Of You – 3:57
- B. Wynona Ryder – 3:49

=== Self Destructive - 1998 on A&M Records Promo CD ===
- 1. Self Destructive (LP Version) – 3:05
- 2. Blue – 3:02
- 3. Winona Ryder – 3:26

=== Unreleased songs ===
- The One You Reach For – 2:52
- Firecracker – 2:48
- Taking The Fall – 3:31

== Other appearances ==
- "Blockhead" (Devo Cover) – We are Not Devo 1997 tribute compilation album
- "Shake Me" (Cinderella Cover) – Mëtal Rüles - A Tribute to the Bad Hair Days 1998 compilation album
- "Facelift" – Happy Meals Volume 2: The Perfect Marriage - 2001 compilation album

== Personnel ==
Band members

1995–1999 lineup

- Kevin Ridel – bass, lead vocals
- Steve Coulter – drums, percussion
- Steve LeRoy – guitar, backing vocals

2013–present lineup

- Kevin Ridel – lead vocals
- Steve Coulter – drums, percussion
- Justin Fisher – bass, backing vocals
- Matt Fuller - guitar
- Marko DeSantis - guitar
