= Awesometown =

Awesometown may refer to:

- Valencia, Santa Clarita, California, branded as "Awesometown", a neighborhood in the United States
- Awesometown, a 2005 TV pilot by the Lonely Island
- Last Train to Awesometown, a song by Parry Gripp
