= Nerf Herder (album) =

Studio album by Nerf Herder
- Released: 1996
- Studio: Orange Whip, Santa Barbara, California; Fat Planet, Van Nuys, CA
- Genre: Nerd rock
- Length: 30:25
- Label: My; Arista
- Producer: Joey Cape; Ryan Greene

Nerf Herder chronology
Nerf Herder (1996)	How to Meet Girls (2000)

Singles from Nerf Herder
- 1. "Van Halen" Released: 1997; 2. "Sorry" Released: 1997

Professional ratings
Review scores
Source	Rating
AllMusic	3/5 stars

Nerf Herder is the debut album by Nerf Herder, released in 1996. It was produced by Joey Cape and Ryan Greene.

The album was released as two nearly identical versions by two different labels—both in 1996. The first version was released by independent label My Records (owned by Joey Cape from Lagwagon) as the label's debut album. The second version was a reissue by major label Arista Records with slightly different inner artwork, redesigned disc artwork, and an alternate version of the song "Easy Mark." Using the original recording, the song's verses and bridge were rewritten and re-recorded because of similarities to lyrics from "Don't Stop Believin'" by Journey.

On February 26, 2026, Nerf Herder announced that they would be re-recording their debut album acoustically under the name Nerf Herder [redux]. Along with the announcement, they also released the first single, "Sorry [redux]". On May 29, 2026, the album was released on streaming under Fat Wreck Chords. It will be followed by the 30 Years of Golfshirt tour.

== Track listing ==
No.	Title	Length
1.	"Down on Haley"	2:23
2.	"Golfshirt"	3:37
3.	"Sorry"	2:52
4.	"Easy Mark"	3:36
5.	"Van Halen"	3:38
6.	"Diana"	3:06
7.	"Nosering Girl"	4:03
8.	"Annalee"	2:02
9.	"You're Gonna Be the One Who's Sorry"	1:52
10.	"I Only Eat Candy"	3:16

== Personnel ==
Nerf Herder

- Steve Sherlock – drums, vocals
- Parry Gripp – vocals, guitar
- Charlie Dennis – bass, vocals

Technical

- Recorded at Orange Whip Studios, Santa Barbara, CA
- Additional tracking at Ryan's House (Fat Planet), Van Nuys, CA
- Mixed at Ryan's House (Fat Planet)
- Mastered at Oceanview Digital
- Produced by Joey Cape and Ryan Greene
- Recorded and mixed by Ryan Greene
- Assistant engineer – Angus Cooke
- Mastered by Joe Gastwirt

Artwork

- Photos by Chappo
- Layout at 3 AM
