= AM Radio (band) =

American rock band

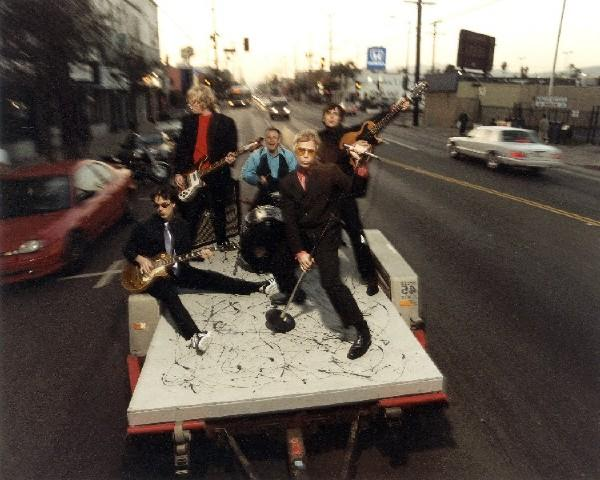

Background information
- Origin: Los Angeles, California, U.S.
- Genres: Alternative rock, alternative metal
- Years active: 2001–present
- Label: PPBaba Music
- Spinoff of: Ridel High; Peel
- Members: Kevin Ridel; Jason Moore; Justin Fisher; Frank Reina
- Past members: Guy Harrington; Adam Hurlbut; Joe Higgins; Rowan Robertson; Bryce Soderberg; Francesca Po; Dan Flutur; Juan Ramirez
- Website: Official Site

AM Radio is an American alternative rock band from Los Angeles.

== History ==
AM Radio, formed in Los Angeles in late 2001 and were formed by former Ridel High songwriter Kevin Ridel after his previous band Peel ended, he brought drummer Joe Higgins with him. The band released one album with major label Elektra Records and were once managed by Weezer frontman Rivers Cuomo.

=== Debut album ===
After forming in 2001 the band quickly recorded and released a self-titled album on Kevin Ridel's own label titled "AM Radio"; it has 10 tracks. The band were helped forming by Weezer frontman Rivers Cuomo, Rivers also managed the band for a short time until 2003.

In 2002, Weezer frontman Rivers Cuomo invited AM Radio to open for Weezer's big summer tours Dusty West Tour, Japan World Cup Tour, and the Enlightenment Tour. After tours road with Weezer, Third Eye Blind, Eve 6, and The Psychedelic Furs, AM Radio was signed by Elektra Records and released their 2nd album Radioactive.

The release of Radioactive was supported by singles "Taken for a Ride" and "I Just Wanna Be Loved." "I Just Wanna Be Loved" was featured on Smallville, a hit TV series on The WB, and released on the show's soundtrack. Also in 2003, "Taken for a Ride" was featured on the videogame soundtrack for EA Sports’ Madden NFL 2004. The band received more support from The WB when "Taken for a Ride" was featured on an episode of One Tree Hill. The song appeared on a television trailer for the FOX feature film The Girl Next Door in the same year.

=== 3rd album ===
After their major label release Radioactive, the band recorded many demos for a planned 3rd album.

AM Radio redirected its musical efforts overseas and pursued a record label with Polydor Records in Japan. Many of the demos tracks recorded for the 3rd album would go on to appear on the rarities release Reactive. It was around this time the band lost bassist Bryce Soderberg who joined Lifehouse. Ridel signed with Sony Publishing Japan and pursued other Japanese side projects as well.

During that time Ridel experimented with a more synth pop sound for the band and brought in new members keyboardist Francesca Po, Dan Flutur on guitar and Juan Ramirez on drums; songs which were rerecorded included tracks "Hush" from Radioactive and "Grapevine" from Reactive.

=== 4th Album as a two-piece ===
After a string of small club tours in Los Angeles and a handful of band rehearsals, Ridel and current AM Radio member Jason Moore began a project entitled "Jason Feat Kevin," commonly referred to by the band as "JFK." The duo then restarted AM Radio in mid/2008 and pursued both groups. In December of that same year, it was announced that AM Radio would record a new album. About a year later, in November, "Bigger Better Bolder Brighter" ("BBBB") was released without the help of a record label.

Ridel described their writing process for this album on the band's MySpace blog:

"We're using a new songwriting formula for this one. First, Jason writes and records the music. Then he sends it over for me to sing and put lyrics to. It's really a fun and inspiring process. J's tracks make me stand up and shout, "Yea!". In the same blog entry, Ridel talked about their choice of producer.

He said, "The working title "Bigger Better Bolder Brighter" is ironic in that we are recording the entire album on our home computers, as opposed to using an expensive studio with a big budget producer."

=== Currently ===
AM Radio recently released their 5th album Shine which was produced by Emmy Award-winning producer Matt Corey; the album also featured longtime friend and former Nerf Herder bassist Justin Fisher

== Members ==
- Kevin Ridel - vocals
- Jason Moore - guitar
- Joe Higgins - drums
- Justin Fisher - bass

== Discography ==
- AM Radio - 2001
- Radioactive - 2003
- Reactive - 2007
- Bigger Better Bolder Brighter - 2009
- Shine - 2013
