= Hoops & Yoyo Ruin Christmas =

2011 American animated Christmas TV special

- Genre: Animated Christmas TV movie
- Based on: Hoops & Yoyo Franchise by Bob Holt & Mike Adair
- Directed by: Tony Craig
- Voices of: Mike Adair; Bob Holt; Bev Carlson; Dave Parke; Brooke Lloyd; Michael Monken; Pamela Morency; Circus-Szalewski (credited as Circus Szalewski)
- Composer: Alan Williams
- Country of origin: United States
- Original language: English

Production
- Executive producers: Shawn McClaren; Jodi Schade; Diana Larson Stuart
- Producer: Melinda Wunsch Dilger
- Running time: approx. 24 minutes
- Production companies: Pershing Road Productions; Hallmark Cards; CBS Productions

Original release
- Network: CBS
- Release: November 25, 2011

Hoops & Yoyo Ruin Christmas is an American animated 2011 Christmas TV special that aired on CBS on November 25, 2011. The special was based on the Hallmark Cards characters Hoops & Yoyo.

== Plot ==
Hoops, Yoyo, and Piddles are having fun during the holidays. When they are decorating late at night, Santa Claus and his reindeer fly down to their house's roof, and, as Hoops, Yoyo and Piddles are hiding, delivers presents. The trio decide to climb into the bag when Santa is not looking. However, Hoops gets stuck and somehow Yoyo and Piddles grasp onto his hand.

Suddenly, they wind up inside the time-space continuum where Santa can deliver presents to everyone. However, the gang loses grip and they wind up in the "Past" portal, breaking the continuum, proven by a chicken turning back into an egg. They get transported to an identical universe and wind up breaking a teenage boy's creation for a toy contest. The part Yoyo accidentally took off is signed with the name "Kris Kringle". Hoops suddenly realizes that they are in the past, because he finds out that Kris Kringle is another name for Santa.

They crawl into Kris Kringle's house and try to convince him that they can help him fix it. He believes them, and then the trio help him fix his creation. The next day, they all go to the Toy Festival. Kris Kringle then meets a little girl who never had a toy. When they are in line for the judges, Kris Kringle is missing. Hoops, Yoyo, and Piddles suddenly notice that he is talking to the little girl. With only a minute left, he must decide whether he should give it to her or win the contest. He gives the toy to the girl and they go back home, leaving Hoops and Yoyo shocked.

At home, the gang is surprised when the little girl redecorated Kris Kringle's house. The little girl tells him that is not all, and she transforms into a beautiful spirit who turns the house into Santa's workshop. She tells him that she was supposed to look for the next Santa. He is considered the next Santa, and his old sleigh turns into Santa's sleigh. Then more reindeer come that can fly the sleigh.

Yoyo and Piddles are excited because they can go home now, but Hoops tells them that they might ruin everything again since it is Kris Kringle's first night as Santa. Yoyo and Piddles agree with Hoops and say goodbye to Kris Kringle and the spirit. They then go inside, but before they can, the real Santa Claus flies down and greets them. When they get inside, they find presents under their tree. They have also received an identical version of Kris's toy, but with the trio on it instead.

== Voices ==
- Mike Adair - Hoops
- Bob Holt - Yoyo
- Bev Carlson - Piddles
- Michael Monken - Kris Kringle / Young Santa Claus
- Dave Parke - Santa Claus
- Brooke Lloyd - The Little Girl
- Pamela Morency - The Spirit
- Circus-Szalewski - Snooty Clerk & Mean Toymaker

== Production ==
The special had music composed by Alan Williams as well as music performed by Parry Gripp. The special was directed by Tony Craig and aired on the CBS network on November 25, 2011 before another special, The Elf on the Shelf: An Elf's Story, based on the book The Elf on the Shelf, premiered.
