= American Cheese (album) =

Studio album by Nerf Herder
- Released: August 13, 2002
- Genre: Pop punk, alternative rock
- Length: 34:38
- Label: Honest Don's
- Producer: Angus Cooke

Nerf Herder chronology
My E.P. (2000)	American Cheese (album) (2002)	Nerf Herder IV (2008)

Professional ratings
Review scores
Source	Rating
AllMusic	4/5 stars
Punknews.org	4/5 stars

American Cheese is the third album by Nerf Herder, released in 2002.

== Track listing ==
All songs written by Parry Gripp, except where indicated.

No.	Title	Length
1.	"Welcome To My World"	2:07
2.	"High Five Anxiety"	3:06
3.	"New Wave Girl"	2:53
4.	"Mr. Spock"	3:29
5.	"Jacket" (words and music by Dave Ehrlich)	3:00
6.	"Rock City News" (music by Dave Ehrlich)	2:06
7.	"Cashmere"	2:37
8.	"Nervous Breakdown"	2:47
9.	"Jenna Bush Army"	3:06
10.	"Defending The Faith"	3:06
11.	"Busted" (music by Tim Hagen)	2:18
12.	"New Jersey Girl"	4:03

A track that didn't make it on to the album called "Bark for the bone" was released via Parry Gripp's website as an MP3. In the file info under album it states - "Completely Unauthorized American Cheese Left Over".

== Personnel ==
- Parry Gripp – vocals, guitar
- Justin Fisher – bass, vocals
- Steve Sherlock – drums, vocals
- Dave Ehrlich – guitar
