= ZooPhobia =

Webcomic by Vivienne Medrano (2012–2016)

- Promotional poster/banner
- Author: Vivienne Medrano
- Website: ZooPhobiaComic.com
- Current status/schedule: Cancelled
- Launch date: July 3, 2012
- End date: March 19, 2016
- Genre(s): Fantasy, slice of life, comedy horror

ZooPhobia is an American webcomic originally published in 2012 by Vivienne "VivziePop" Medrano, from which she later loosely adapted characters and plotlines for her animated musical television series Hazbin Hotel. It follows a young woman named Cameron, who travels to an interspecies sanctuary named Safe Haven. Two ZooPhobia short films, "The Son of 666" and "Bad Luck Jack", were released in 2013 and 2020, respectively.

== Plot ==
Cameron, a neurotic young woman, is sent to an island sanctuary named Safe Haven by accident after she desperately pleas for a counseling job. She discovers that she cannot leave the island, as doing so would cause it to lose its magic. She spends the duration of the comic trying to lessen her fear of the animals (zoophobia) in Safe Haven, trying to adapt to the unfamiliar environment she was thrown into.

== Characters ==
- Cameron "Cam" Walden, a human woman who came to Safe Haven by accident. She has zoophobia, a fear of animals, making it difficult for her to integrate herself into the society of Safe Haven. She is a guidance counselor at the Zoo Phoenix Academy (ZPA).
- Zill, a student at the Zoo Phoenix Academy, with kind and friendly personality, who dates Kayla, and is the best friend of Jack. He was created in a science experiment, being a hybrid creature, with characteristics of a chimera, a dragon, and a demon, and has super powers. He is a member of the drama club.
- Jack, a superstitious jackal cursed with immortality and bad luck. He is Zill's best friend, with Kayla, Vanexa, and Spam being his other friends. He is Damian's cousin. Jack is a student at the Zoo Phoenix Academy, and a Member of the drama club. Most people avoid him, fearing they will be hurt by his bad luck.
- Kayla, a theater-loving kangaroo, student at the ZPA, and the girlfriend of Zill.
- Damian, a demon and the mischievous son of Lucifer, the ruler of Hell, who is attending the ZPA, in secret from his father. He is Jack's cousin.
- Vanexa, a pessimistic purple cat. She is a student at the Zoo Phoenix Academy, and a member of the drama club, being friends with Zill, Jack, Kayla, and Spam.
- Spam, a music-loving fox. He is a student at the Zoo Phoenix Academy, and a member of the drama club, being friends with Zill, Jack, Kayla, and Vanexa.
- Gustav, a snake-like creature who is an assistant teacher at the ZPA, and is dating one of the students, Addison.
- Addison, a student at the ZPA, who is dating one of the faculty teachers, Gustav.

== Release ==
Although the comic was originally released in 2012, Medrano mentioned creating a webcomic in December 2010. The comic went on hiatus for an indefinite period in November 2016, reportedly because Medrano wanted to focus on developing her unpublished Angels and Demons arc of ZooPhobia into an animated series, which later became Hazbin Hotel. In April 2017, Medrano said that the comic would get a "complete reboot", and hinted at the same in a July 2018 Tumblr post.

=== Future ===
In September 2025, Medrano said that she would like to do more with the webcomic's characters, possibly including more animated shorts and a graphic novel, the latter of which she had initially wanted to do as a college student. A miniseries based on the same name was announced at the 2026 LVL UP Expo.

== Short films ==
=== "The Son of 666" ===
External videos
- ZooPhobia – "The Son of 666" — Official upload of the film onto YouTube

On January 7, 2013, Medrano announced the development of an animated short film prequel to ZooPhobia as her thesis film for her third year at School of Visual Arts, to follow a younger Damian and his father Lucifer. Titled "The Son of 666", and written, directed, and animated by Medrano herself, the two-minute short film was released to her YouTube channel on April 15, 2013.

=== "Bad Luck Jack" ===
External videos
- ZooPhobia – "Bad Luck Jack" — Official upload of the film onto YouTube

On September 30, 2020, Medrano released a 12-minute animated ZooPhobia short film on her YouTube channel, titled "Bad Luck Jack". It was funded by crowdfunding from her Patreon. The short featured various characters from the webcomic and music by Gooseworx. Medrano said the animated short was "very special" to her. Two songs in the short, "Make a Start" and "The Curse" were written by Sam Haft, while Parry Gripp wrote the song "Monster Fighting Time". Bryson Baugus voiced Jack, Joe Zieja voiced Zill, Reba Buhr voiced Kayla (with Cristina Vee providing Kayla's singing voice), Eric Shonk voiced Spam, Kayli Mills voiced Vanexa, and Benjamin Diskin voiced Rusty. The short was co-written by Medrano and Amanda Heard, and was animated by Medrano and her production company SpindleHorse Toons.

== Music video ==
External videos
- ZooPhobia – "Die Young" — Official upload of the film onto YouTube

On October 30, 2014, Medrano released a music video set to "Die Young" by Kesha and Becky G, following the werewolf JayJay hosting a party with other ZooPhobia characters. By November 2019, the animation would accumulate over 50 million views. The video was taken down following the release of the season 1 finale of Helluva Boss "Queen Bee" (in which Kesha appears as Queen Bee-lzebub) due to copyright issues.

== Audiovisual adaptation ==
On March 2, 2016, Medrano announced ZooPhobia: The AudioVisual Adaptation to be in development, adapting the existing and unpublished comic as a semi-animated web series. It was to be scored by Gooseworx, voice directed by Connor "Connorhea" Cheely, and star Whitesin as Cameron Walden and Megan "Inky" Youmans as KayCee. It has not seen completion as of 2026.

== Reception ==
Larry Cruz of CBR compared the journey of the protagonist, Cameron, to Charlotte Brontë's Jane Eyre. Cruz also praised Medrano's artistic style as "visually appealing", calling it unconventional like a "John Kricfalusi cartoon" and called the storytelling "decent". He also criticized the story of Cameron overcoming her intense fear of animals to be "a little rushed", and said that the designs of the animal characters were too similar to each other. Ahmar Wolf of the Furry Times called the webcomic unique, adding that "whether you think it is good depends on your taste", praised the artistic style, and argued that the storyline is "out there", making it a comic you will either "love or hate".

Dan Short of Animated Views differentiated the animated short, "Bad Luck Jack", from Medrano's other works, saying that it is "equivalent to a Disney Channel program like High School Musical" because it is "wholesome, super tame, contains no sexual references, and has no profanity," making it family-friendly. Short also wrote that the short is visually appealing, and could serve as an introduction to those not familiar with the series. He stated that Kayla stands out because of her Australian accent, and praised the voice cast and musical numbers. Short concluded by calling the short "perfectly enjoyable".

== Awards ==
The animated short "Bad Luck Jack" won a Ursa Major Award in the "Best Dramatic Short Work" category in 2020. The Ursa Major awards are given in the field of furry fandom works and are the main awards in the field of anthropomorphism. The short was also listed as a "Recommended Anthropomorphic Dramatic Short Work" on the Ursa Major Award website.
