= List of The 7D episodes =

The 7D is an American animated television series produced by Disney Television Animation. It premiered on July 7, 2014, and ended on November 5, 2016, and airs on Disney XD worldwide (Disney Channel and Disney Junior in some countries). It is a re-imagining of the title characters from the 1937 film Snow White and the Seven Dwarfs by Walt Disney Animation Studios. The first season consisted of 24 episodes. On December 2, 2014, the series was renewed for a second season. On April 25, 2016, it was announced that The 7D would not continue after the second season.

== Series overview ==
Season	Segments	Episodes	Originally released	
Season	Segments	Episodes	First released	Last released
1	47	24	July 7, 2014	September 12, 2015
2	40	20	January 23, 2016	November 5, 2016

== Episodes ==
=== Season 1 (2014–15) ===
No. overall	No. in season	Title	Directed by	Written by	Storyboard by	Original release date	Prod. code	US viewers (millions)
1a	1a	"The Long, Long Winter"	Alfred Gimeno	Paul Rugg	David Bennett	July 7, 2014	108	0.55
When Queen Delightful announces the changing of seasons, Jollywood Joe, the Spring Chicken, is nowhere to be found. The Glooms have cast a spell so that Jollywood will stay in winter if Joe is not found by morning. Delightful summons the 7D, who head to Joe's perch, but they discover that the Glooms have kidnapped Joe. They find their hideout, rescue Joe, and return him just in time.
1b	1b	"Itsy Bitsy Spider Fighters"	Charles Visser	Randy Rogel	Barry Caldwell	July 7, 2014	108	0.55
Delightful summons the 7D to remove a spider from her castle as a result of Lord Starchbottom's fear of spiders. When Hildy learns of the fear but mistakenly believes Delightful is the one with a fear of spiders, she turns Grim into a giant spider and places him in the castle. Grumpy gets scared when he sees spider Grim, but the others only notice the little spider who has scared Grim off to another room. As Grumpy, Grim, and the 7D scramble about the castle, Delightful and Starchbottom return. Grim tries one last time to scare Delightful but flees when he sees the little spider on Starchbottom's hat.
2a	2a	"Sneezin' Season"	Alfred Gimeno	John McCann, Tom Ruegger & Sherri Stoner	Tina Kugler	July 8, 2014	102	0.64
As the 7D pick jollyberries for the pie festival, Grim and Hildy plan to snip hairs from Grumpy's beard to complete a mind-control potion. However, Sneezy sends a sneeze that blasts them away and sends Grumpy to Australia. Thinking that Sneezy might be allergic to Grumpy, the dwarfs send Grumpy to live with Delightful, but that night, when the Glooms visit the 7D as traveling hairstylists, Sneezy reacts again and blows off their disguises. The day of the festival, while everyone is throwing pies, Hildy manages to snip a piece of Grumpy's beard, but the Glooms are forced to retreat when Grumpy has Sneezy blast pies at them. They discover that Sneezy is allergic to the squirrel that has been tagging along with the Glooms.
2b	2b	"The Delightful Diamond Mystery"	Alfred Gimeno	Randy Rogel & Sherri Stoner	Joe Banaszkiewicz and Kevin Frank	July 8, 2014	102	0.64
Queen Delightful discovers that her "Delightful Diamond" has gone missing. After querying Magic Mirror, Doc sets up an elaborate trap. That night, the 7D scatter through the castle as a ghost has been floating around, and discover the diamond under Starchbottom's bed, but he denies taking it. After some more scrambling, they realize that Delightful's dog Sir Yipsalot had taken the diamond.
3a	3a	"Mirror, Mirror"	Charles Visser	Randy Rogel	David Bennett	July 9, 2014	104	N/A
Hildy has Grim buy a Magic Mirror of her own, but when that mirror refuses to compliment her, Grim steals Delightful’s mirror and replaces it with the Not-So-Magic Mirror. Queen Delightful summons the 7D, who burrow under the Glooms’ home to take back the Magic Mirror (who also refuses to compliment Hildy because she can only tell the truth). Guest star: Wallace Shawn as the Not-So-Magic Mirror
3b	3b	"The Big Bash"	Alfred Gimeno	Roger Eschbacher & Sherri Stoner	Barry Caldwell	July 9, 2014	104	N/A
As Jollywood celebrates their sky bucket transportation system at Jollywood's Buckets of Fun Day, Bashful inadvertently causes the arrival of the queen’s new sky bucket to malfunction. He apologizes and hides in Grumpy’s red underwear, but this attracts a bull and he ends up riding him, losing the top of his hat. As they rampage through town, he starts helping folks and even Queen Delightful when the Glooms target her golden sky bucket, soon naming his masked vigilante alias "The Big Bash."
4a	4a	"Surprise"	Alfred Gimeno	Paul Rugg	Michael Diederich	July 10, 2014	107	N/A
When the Glooms observe the 7D telling Lord Starchbottom to keep Queen Delightful away from the castle for a surprise party, Hildy has Grim continue spying so he can prepare one for herself. As the 7D decorate the palace room, Starchbottom has Delightful do various tasks, while Hildy has trouble finding a friend to invite. When they return, the 7D end up surprising Starchbottom by saying it is actually for his own birthday, and Hildy is happy to see Grim in a clown suit and her cow "friend."
4b	4b	"Welcome to the Neighborhood"	Charles Visser	Deanna Oliver	Kris Wimberly	July 10, 2014	107	N/A
The 7D discover they have new next-door neighbors named the Grins, who are actually the Glooms in disguise, and have them over for dinner. While Happy gives them a tour of the mine, the other 7D scramble to warn Happy, but the Glooms reveal themselves and steal Happy’s keys. Hoping to find a gem called the Rock of Sages, they unlock a forbidden door, but end up sliding down the disposal chute.
5a	5a	"Sir Yipsalot and the Goose"	Alfred Gimeno	Deanna Oliver	Joe Banaszkiewicz	July 11, 2014	105	0.72
The Glooms abduct Sir Yipsalot and replace him with a goose setting up a ransom for the key to the castle. While the 7D impersonate Delightful, Sir Yipsalot trashes the Glooms’ home and escapes, forcing them to pretend they still have him. The Queen, Starchbottom and the 7D eventually find Sir Yipsalot using his favorite snack, while the Glooms are unable to disarm the castle’s security system. Grim reveals where he got the goose.
5b	5b	"Starchy Takes a Break"	Charles Visser	Paul Rugg	Douglas McCarthy	July 11, 2014	105	0.72
After the 7D clean and shine the palace floor so it can be skated on, Starchbottom arrives, but slips and injures his leg. The 7D take care of him while Grumpy takes his place. Doc puts Starchbottom on a special bed contraption. Grumpy tries to eat and relax, but his remark inspires Delightful to have him redecorate Starchbottom’s room. Although Starchbottom gets stuck in a dump, both literally and figuratively, the 7D find and retrieve him.
6a	6a	"The Littlest Giants"	Alfred Gimeno	Tom Ruegger	Roger Dondis and Alfred Gimeno	July 14, 2014	101	N/A
The Glooms pilot a mechanical giant to raid Jollywood's main village, so Queen Delightful summons the 7D to investigate. They come up with something that can scare off the giant.
6b	6b	"Gnome Alone"	Alfred Gimeno	Sherri Stoner	Kevin Frank	July 14, 2014	101	N/A
Sleepy gets left behind when the 7D are tricked by the Glooms into going on a vacation to the Enchanted Seaside Resort. The Glooms follow Sleepy into the 7D's mine so that they can steal the Royal Ruby. However, on their vacation, the other 7D realize Sleepy was forgotten and rush back to help save the day.
7a	7a	"Sleepytime"	Charles Visser	Deanna Oliver	Carson Kugler	July 15, 2014	106	N/A
Hildy casts a sleeping spell on Jollywood in order to upstage her rival Snazzy Shazam for an award for most people put to sleep, but falls short as Sleepy awakes. Sleepy and Sir Yipsalot must trek to the top of Mt. Jollymonjaro in order to break the spell by sundown. During the quest, Sleepy relies on the knowledge and advice from the 7D to accomplish the task.
7b	7b	"Goldilocks and the 7D"	Alfred Gimeno	Randy Rogel, Tom Ruegger & Sherri Stoner	Kevin Frank	July 15, 2014	106	N/A
Goldilocks finds the 7D's cottage while on the run from the Three Bears after she broke into their cottage. Goldilocks uses her cuteness to convince the 7D to stay over, but when she takes advantage of their hospitality, each of the 7D gradually changes his opinion to wanting to kick her out. Guest star: Nancy Cartwright as Goldilocks
8a	8a	"For the Love of Cheese"	Alfred Gimeno	Deanna Oliver	Kevin Frank	July 21, 2014	103	N/A
After Grim accidentally turns into a frog, Hildy tries to turn him back to normal by seeking a heart-shaped gem (although the picture is that of a kiss) that Grumpy acquires from the mines. During Cheese Day, when Grumpy puts the gem in his pocket, he inadvertently attracts the affections of those nearby, especially Hildy, as the gem is actually a Love Stone. Meanwhile, the rest of the 7D bake crackers to make up for the ones they ate from Grumpy.
8b	8b	"Let's Get Organ-ized"	Charles Visser	Tom Ruegger & Craig Shemin	Carson Kugler	July 21, 2014	103	N/A
The Glooms sabotage Queen Delightful's pipe organ by dropping rocks into its pipes. Disguised as pipe organ salespeople, they get her to replace the organ which would be one that turns everyone into stone. Unaware of the Glooms' plan, the 7D are summoned to remove the broken pipe organ, using Doc's "How Do You Do" invention to help out.
9a	9a	"Grampa Grumpy and the Ogre"	Charles Visser	Deanna Oliver	Carson Kugler	July 22, 2014	110	N/A
Grumpy and Happy help their grandfathers search for a missing gem that was stolen by an ogre. They ride a multi-purpose vehicle called a Flumadiddle to search for the creature. They find the ogre in the cave where he has stolen all sorts of things and offer him something he likes to recover the items, which turns out to be candy corn.
9b	9b	"The Fairest in the Land"	Alfred Gimeno	Shea Fontana	Michael Diederich and Kenny Tompkins	July 22, 2014	110	N/A
With the upcoming Jollies awards, the Magic Mirror will judge the "Fairest in the Land" and award a Jolly magic wand. Hildy and Grim disguise themselves to give Queen Delightful a makeover to turn her into something hideous. But the Mirror judges Delightful the fairest in the land anyway, revealing that she looks at a person’s inner beauty. The wand transforms Delightful to normal and transforms Hildy into something hideous.
10a	10a	"The 8th D"	Jeff Gordon	Deanna Oliver	Kevin Frank	July 28, 2014	111	0.60
Dopey has been keeping woodland creatures as pets, so the 7D tell him to not bring any more home. However, he brings an elephant that he tries to pass off as a friend. Grim plans to obtain the elephant for Hildy, but grabs Grumpy. The 7D must take the elephant back to the jungle to its parents and keep it from falling into the clutches of the Glooms.
10b	10b	"New Shoe"	Jeff Gordon	Paul Rugg	Douglas McCarthy	July 28, 2014	111	0.60
The Old Woman who lives in a Shoe must return her home back to the giant, so Queen Delightful has Lord Starchbottom lead the 7D to construct a new shoe house. Delightful takes Old Woman to the Jollywood spa for some pampering, while Lord Starchbottom struggles with getting the design of the shoe house on paper, and Grumpy has to babysit her children.
11a	11a	"Bathtub Bashful"	Alfred Gimeno	Randy Rogel	Barry Caldwell and Kenny Tompkins	August 4, 2014	112	0.75
When singer Jenny Jollywood comes down with a frog in her throat before the Jollypalooza concert, Queen Delightful discovers that Bashful is a good singer, and wants him to sing at the event. Bashful reveals to the other 7D that he is only able to sing well in the shower because of his shyness. While Lord Starchbottom scrambles to put together opening acts to stall for time, the 7D come up with a way to enable Bashful to get over his stage fright.
11b	11b	"Knick Knack Paddy Whack"	Charles Visser	Roger Eschbacher, Deanna Oliver & Sherri Stoner	David Bennett	August 4, 2014	112	0.75
The 7D bring an oyster that has a Pearl of Wisdom for Queen Delightful. Lord Starchbottom stores it inside the Knick Knack room, but tries to avoid saying "Knick Knack" because it prompts Delightful to sing the related verse from "This Old Man" and he would have to roll down a hill quoting "This old man came rolling home." In order to win a fancy cloak, Hildy and Grim must answer a riddle without consulting the Crystal Ball, so they steal Delightful's oyster but are unable to open it. The 7D try various methods to distract the Glooms so they can recover the oyster.
12a	12a	"Grim the Dragon"	Charles Visser	Shea Fontana	Kevin Frank	September 14, 2014	113	N/A
The 7D find a sphere that Doc thinks is the Enchanted Pearl of Massiveness. Inspired by a recent dragon attack and being unable to find a pet dragon, Hildy turns Grim into a dragon to scare the villagers out of Jollywood. When the actual dragon returns and mistakes Grim as her child, Hildy poses as Little Bo Peep in order to get the 7D to rescue Grim. The 7D discover that the pearl is actually a dragon egg, and they return the baby dragon to its mother.
12b	12b	"Free Teensy"	Jeff Gordon	Charles M. Howell IV & Sherri Stoner	Douglas McCarthy	September 14, 2014	113	N/A
Hildy has a shape-shifting ring that allows her to transform into whatever is convenient for her, but she loses it and it is accidentally thrown into a carnival goldfish bowl and swallowed by a Jolly-Go-Jumbo fish that Queen Delightful wins. As the Glooms try to recover the ring, Delightful notices her fish Teensy grows quickly in size, and must relocate it to the sea. Teensy swallowed the Glooms and later regurgitated them out, so they have to be rescued by the 7D.
13a	13a	"The Jollywood Jam"	Charles Visser	Shea Fontana	David Bennett and Peter Paul Bautista	September 21, 2014	114	N/A
Jollywood is having a concert to commemorate the victory of its founding fathers over an evil warlock who was Grim's great-great-grandfather. Hildy gives Grim a new magic wand that reads the person’s mind and brings it to effect. However, a road collision causes the wand to be swapped with Happy's conductor baton. As a result, the 7D's performance turns out to be a magical music extravaganza.
13b	13b	"Hildy the Good"	Jeff Gordon	Shea Fontana & Sherri Stoner	Lenord Robinson	September 21, 2014	114	N/A
When Hildy destroys the Jollywood Dam, Dopey saves the day by summoning beavers to build another one. Using a good witch kit, Hildy transforms into a good witch, complete with a cheerful theme song and doing good deeds. This quickly earns the trust of Queen Delightful and the 7D, but Hildy becomes more irritated about acting good all the time. When Hildy relapses, the Glooms lock Delightful in the tower and teleport Starchbottom to the mines, but luckily, the 7D rescue them. Dopey then has the beavers box up the Glooms and ship them to a remote island.
14a	14a	"Buckets"	Jeff Gordon	Sherri Stoner	Carson Kugler	October 12, 2014	117	N/A
Delightful informs the 7D that her Uncle Humidor is selling a mansion by the sea and that she wants the 7D to recover her buckets. While Bashful stays to guard the queen, the rest of the 7D and Lord Starchbottom travel to the mansion and start gathering as many buckets as they can see. However, the mansion is haunted by a ghost girl. After they return, they discover that the buckets in question is the name of the ghost girl who Queen Delightful thinks is her imaginary friend. Guest star: Kate Micucci as Ghost Girl
14b	14b	"Frankengloom"	Mr. Warburton	Deanna Oliver & Randy Rogel	David Bennett	October 12, 2014	117	N/A
The Glooms create a terrifying monster from a "Make Your Own Monster" kit as part of a plot to drive Queen Delightful out of her castle. The monster goes on a rampage whenever it hears a whistle, but calms down when hearing a bell ring. However, their plan backfires as Queen Delightful decides to befriend the monster (whom she names Roar) and teaches him how to sing. Guest star: Jim Cummings as Roar
15a	15a	"Uncle Humidor"	Charles Visser	Paul Rugg	Carson Kugler	November 2, 2014	115	N/A
Queen Delightful's Uncle Humidor visits with the hopes of completing his sketch book of a Jollywood bird called the Shiffle-Nosed Nergendingslinger. The 7D, Delightful and Starchbottom join him and he seeks the Shiffle-Nosed Nergendingslinger, a rare species that only appears once every ten years. After failing to get the bird to stay still, they get Grumpy to dress up as one, but the bird mistakes Grumpy for one of its chicks and takes him away. Guest star: Michael McKean as Uncle Humidor
15b	15b	"Grim the Genius"	Jeff Gordon	Randy Rogel	Kenny Tompkins	November 2, 2014	115	N/A
Hildy has gotten fed up with Grim's incompetence causing Grim to find a way to become smart. The Crystal Ball hears his plight and tells Grim about the Smarty Stone (a stone that increases one's intelligence) that is in Doc's possession. When Grim obtains the Smarty Stone from Doc while posing as Toasty, it makes him magically smart where he is successful in his attempt to outwit the 7D and overthrow Queen Delightful. Hildy is delighted until she realizes that Grim is not paying as much attention to her. The 7D must now work to outsmart Grim and reclaim the castle.
16a	16a	"The Enchanted Shoes"	Alfred Gimeno	Roger Eschbacher & Deanna Oliver	Kirk Hanson	November 16, 2014	116	N/A
Grumpy's shoes make flatulent noises, so he gets them repaired by Cobby the cobbler. However, they notice that everyone in Jollywood is getting sneakers from the neighboring store, and soon discover that the new cobblers are actually the Glooms, who have put a shoe spell to make whoever is wearing their sneakers run endlessly. The Glooms take over Delightful's castle and invite the goblins to a party there with the hopes of enslaving them. Grumpy and Cobby dress up as goblins and foil the Glooms' plans. Guest star: Rob Paulsen as Cobby
16b	16b	"Hildyrella"	Jeff Gordon	Shea Fontana	Mark Maxey	November 16, 2014	116	N/A
Hildy prepares for the Ultimate Supreme Sorceress Pageant hosted by Snake Charming. On the way there, she falls and is covered in mud, so she wishes for a fairy godmother and gets one, but the fairy godmother is rather unconventional in granting her requests. Meanwhile, Queen Delightful summons the 7D to find her missing roller skates so she can participate in her team's Inter-Kingdom Roller Derby Championship. Suspecting the Glooms might have stolen them, the 7D sneak into the pageant and end up being the judges for the competition, as Hildy ends up in the finals against Snazzy Shazam and Jinxy Coven. It turns out that the shoes the fairy godmother gave Hildy was Queen Delightful's retractable roller skates. After the roller skates are returned to Queen Delightful, the fairy godmother is declared the winner by Snake Charming and is presented with the Tiara of Doom, much to the dismay of Hildy, Snazzy, and Jinxy.
17a	17a	"Big Bad Sneezy"	Alfred Gimeno & Mr. Warburton	Shea Fontana, Randy Rogel, Deanna Oliver & Sherri Stoner	Kevin Frank	November 30, 2014	118	N/A
Sneezy's sneezing has been wrecking Jollywood, especially when it's allergy season, so he leaves the 7D. In the woods, he encounters the Big Bad Wolf, who recruits him to blow down houses of the pigs, and then has him redirect a sign to trap Little Red Riding Hood, but the 7D find Sneezy and reveal what has been happening. The 7D and Little Red Riding Hood hatch a plan to get back at the Big Bad Wolf.
17b	17b	"Cat on a Hot Grim Roof"	Jeff Gordon	Randy Rogel	Barry Caldwell	November 30, 2014	118	N/A
Hildy learns that Snazzy Shazam has a black cat, so she makes Grim buy one at the witch pet store. Grim gets a white cat, so Hildy has him look for a black cat. When she tries to get rid of the white cat, she sees it back at her house, and after several attempts, she discovers there are seven white cats. Grim sends them to the home of the 7D. After Grim finally gets a black cat, Hildy shows it off to Snazzy, who replies that black cats are so last week and that the trend now is to acquire the seven white cats of Catalina which have magical powers.
18a	18a	"Gingersnaps and Grumpy Snaps"	Alfred Gimeno	Cooper Sweeney	Kevin Frank	December 2, 2014	109	0.26
While ice fishing, Grumpy saves an elf from drowning. The elf, named Gingersnaps, pledges to be Grumpy's servant for the rest of his life. At first, Grumpy enjoys being served, but Gingersnaps starts doing all of his work including decorating the Jollywood Tree and speed reading his cheese book. The 7D try to free Gingersnaps from his obligation to serve by having him rescue Grumpy from a bear. Guest star: Cheri Oteri as Gingersnaps
18b	18b	"Jollybells"	Charles Visser	Deanna Oliver & Sherri Stoner	Douglas McCarthy	December 2, 2014	109	0.26
As Jollywood celebrates Jolly Day, the Glooms have their own celebration of Gloomy Day. Hildy gets irritated at the merriment, so Grim gives Hildy a device that sucks the joy out of people and they use it on the 7D and the Jollywood townsfolk. Happy and Bashful realize what is going on and try to rally everyone around the Jollywood Tree to cheer them up.
19a	19a	"The Very Important Thingy"	Alfred Gimeno	Lisa Arch & Sherri Stoner	Michael Diederich	January 13, 2015	119	N/A
Queen Delightful has Doc invent a Thingy so that her upcoming announcement can be heard even in the next kingdom over. While Doc tries to find someplace quiet to concentrate on the plans for the Thingy, which leads to him working on the plans in the Tranquil Desert, the other 7D turn to Lord Starchbottom to teach them how to be quiet. When Doc's Thingy is finally created, Queen Delightful's invention impresses the ruler of the next kingdom over to have a Thingy made to respond to Queen Delightful's announcements.
19b	19b	"Leaf It To Sneezy"	Charles Visser	Gene Grillo & Deanna Oliver	Kenny Tompkins	January 13, 2015	119	N/A
During Autumn, Grumpy and Happy use Sneezy to blow leaves to Queen Delightful's Jumpity-Jump-Jump-Jaroo Fall into Fall Day. When Hildy creates a Leaf Monster to take Queen Delightful to Gusty Gorge (a tornado-filled location where the North, South, East, and West meet), she gives Sneezy amsneezia (a condition where the person can't remember how to sneeze) so that his sneeze can't blow away her Leaf Monster. While the others try to stall the Leaf Monster, Doc takes Sneezy to the enchanted bowling alley called Memory Lane, which is run by Jack Flashback, in order to find the bowling ball containing the knowledge to sneeze and kick down the pins. Guest star: Jeff Bennett as Jack Flashback
20a	20a	"7 Frogs"	Alfred Gimeno	Blake Larson & Sherri Stoner	David Bennett	January 14, 2015	120	N/A
As Queen Delightful prepares for a party for her old friend Princess Prettyhead, the inhabitants of Jollywood are turned into frogs by a spell. The 7D suspect that the Glooms were responsible only to find that they have been turned into frogs as well. The one who casts the spell can break it with a kiss. After visits to the Gingerbread Witch (the one from the Hansel and Gretel story), the Water Witch, and the Snow Witch, they find the Frog Witch, their kiss changing her back into her true form of Princess Prettyhead. Princess Prettyhead then proceeds to transform those who have been turned into frogs back to normal.
20b	20b	"Sir Yipsalot and the Mutt"	Charles Visser	Shea Fontana	Douglas McCarthy	January 14, 2015	120	N/A
During the Royal Walk of Sir Yipsalot, when the Stroganoff Circus arrives in town, a squirrel distracts Yipsalot, causing him to get mixed up with a look-alike who picks up Stroganoff's flea circus. The 7D must find the real Sir Yipsalot and get the Von Flea family back to the Stroganoff Circus. Once this is done, the Stroganoff Circus regains the Von Flea Family and gains the stray dog, while Queen Delightful lets Sir Yipsalot do things royal dogs couldn't do.
21a	21a	"The Queen's Quest"	Jeff Gordon	Shea Fontana, Deanna Oliver & Sherri Stoner	Mark Maxey	January 19, 2015	121	N/A
While the 7D are having a day off at the beach, Grim poses as a genie who frees Magic Mirror from her mirror so that she can have a day off, and then distracts her by taking her around town to do different activities. Meanwhile, Hildy poses as the Magic Mirror and sends Queen Delightful on a quest to save the 7D from the Armpit of Doom so that Hildy can take over as queen. The 7D are alerted of the quest, and follow her to the location where, after enduring some obstacles, encounter a giant monster guardian whom Delightful defeats. Upon returning to Jollywood, Delightful has the monster (named Kevin) take the Glooms to the Armpit of Doom.
21b	21b	"Finders Keepers"	Jeff Gordon	Gene Grillo & Deanna Oliver	Carson Kugler	January 15, 2015	121	N/A
Grumpy's pet goat Giselle and the Glooms' pet warthog Peaches are drawn from their pens to the campsite of Sid the Troll, where they eat Sid's bug pudding. Sid sends the two to Lost Acres, where they are captured by another troll. Grumpy and Grim team up to search for their pets at the Lost Acres, but they must face Sid's twin brother Finders Keeper, who has a large collection of lost items. Grumpy and Grim must compete on Keeper's game show. Guest stars: Kelly Ward as Kittens, Rob Paulsen as Sid and Finders Keeper
22a	22a	"Abraca-Dopey"	Charles Visser	Shea Fontana & Charles M. Howell IV	Barry Caldwell	January 20, 2015	122	N/A
Dopey has been practicing a magic act as the Daring Dopini for Jollywood's upcoming show. During rehearsal, Dopey makes Sleepy disappear, but when he reappears, he is a bear. While Dopey tries to find a way to fix his magical error, the others work to keep Sleepy calm even when the 7D are summoned by Queen Delightful to attend to her party attended by Emperor and Empress Fancypants. When Dopey figures out the error, it turns out that the magic box was set in front of a cave of bears, and Sleepy was in the magic box all along. By the time of the magic show, Dopey comes up with a way to make it look like that he learned a trick that turned the 7D members into bears.
22b	22b	"Bing Bong Beans"	Alfred Gimeno	Shea Fontana, Blake Larson & Sherri Stoner	Kevin Frank	January 22, 2015	122	N/A
While birdwatching, Hildy gets the idea to obtain the Woopty Doopty Schmoodly Duck (a yellow duck that lays bejeweled eggs) from the Kingdom of the Clouds. In order to get to the Kingdom of the Cloud to fix the Bing Bong Bell which is ringing on its own, the 7D obtain the seeds for the Bing Bong Beanstalk in order to grow it to get to the Kingdom of the Clouds. The Bing Bong Beanstalk takes the 7D's house to the Giant's castle, where the Glooms were made into his servants for the attempted theft of the Woopty Doopty Schmoodly Duck while using the Bing Bong Bell to call them due to his hurting feet preventing him from doing his jobs. Doc figures out that the Giant has foot problems due to his small shoes, so the 7D work on new shoes for the Giant and he fixes the Bing Bong Bell. When the Glooms try to steal the Woopty Doopty Schmoodly Duck for its eggs, the 7D and the Giant pursue the Glooms, and Woopty Doopty Schmoodly Duck is reclaimed by the Giant. The Glooms end up becoming the Giant's new toys. Guest star: Jimmy Weldon as Whoopty Doopty Schmoodily Duck
23a	23a	"Doing the 7D Dance"	Charles Visser	Deanna Oliver	Douglas McCarthy and Kevin Frank	January 21, 2015	123	N/A
When about to be launched out of Jollywood by the Glooms, the 7D and Queen Delightful recap to earlier when Grumpy develops a new dance upon getting ice in his pants, leading to the 7D Dance. Queen Delightful has the 7D demonstrate the dance to all of Jollywood, and it catches on and has Lord Starchbottom be their manager. The Glooms perform a trick that enables them to capture Queen Delightful and the 7D, leading to their current predicament. When the rocket that Queen Delightful, Lord Starchbottom, and the 7D are on launches, Doc gains control of the rocket and enables them to return to Jollywood where the rocket blasts the Glooms away instead.
23b	23b	"Big Rock Candy Flim-Flam"	Jeff Gordon	Deanna Oliver, Sherri Stoner	Michael Diederich and Mark Maxey	January 21, 2015	123	N/A
Queen Delightful's Great Great Grandmommers Whimsical is coming to visit her at midnight. However, the Tick Tock Clock Tower gets stuck at midnight. so the 7D find a replacement crystal to power the Tick Tock Clock before it is midnight forever, but as the crystal is made out of rock candy, they must get it to the tower before the candy sprites Tangy and Sweetie snatch it. Guest stars: Debbie Reynolds as Grandmommers Whimsical. Deanna Oliver as Tangy, Sherri Stoner as Sweetie
24	24	"The Rock of Sages"	Alfred Gimeno, Jeff Gordon & Charles Visser	Sherri Stoner	David Bennett and Kevin Frank	September 12, 2015	124	0.55
The Glooms turn Mount Jollywood into a volcano, forcing Queen Delightful to surrender her crown. However, when the Glooms are unable to stop the eruption, the 7D are tasked to travel all over the lands to retrieve the seven gem fragments that together form the Rock of Sages. Each of the 7D is able to find his piece, and they unite the gem. However, the narrator of the tale turns out to be Lord Grudgemunger, a villain who uses the rock to absorb the magic of Jollywood and to summon a volcano monster. The 7D take advantage of Grudgemunger's requirement of having to follow the story by inserting some pages to restore everything to normal. Hildy loses the throne to Delightful, Lord Grudgemunger's volcano monster runs into the sea, all the magic has drained out of Grudgemunger and back to where it belongs, and Lord Grudgemunger skips away forever. Guest star: Corey Burton as Lord Grudgemunger

=== Season 2 (2016) ===
No. overall	No. in season	Title	Directed by	Written by	Storyboard by	Original release date	Prod. code	US viewers (millions)
25a	1a	"When Pigs Fly"	Charles Visser	Tom Ruegger	Douglas McCarthy	January 23, 2016	203	0.64
The Glooms put a spell on the pigs of Jollywood to have them fly and eat all the food in the village. The villagers leave town and are attracted to join the Hildegard Estates community, of which Hildy plans to make the villagers her minions, but the 7D save the day thanks to Starchbottom's terrible tasting smoothies.
25b	1b	"Knight School"	Alfred Gimeno	Deanna Oliver	Kevin Frank	January 23, 2016	203	0.64
A handsome knight named Sir Charms-a-lot comes to Jollywood, and "saves" the kingdom from a fire-breathing dragon. Queen Delightful falls in love with Charms-a-lot and invites him to stay at her castle, making Bashful jealous. Along with Grumpy, Bashful enrolls in knight school, where they learn things like chivalry and jousting. When Charms-a-lot refuses to compensate the dragon, the latter brings his big brother to attack the castle, but the recent knight graduates come back to save the day.
26a	2a	"In Yer Dreams, Pal"	Alfred Gimeno	Sherri Stoner	Alfred Gimeno	January 30, 2016	202	0.39
An evil spirit of darkness named Nocturna kidnaps the Sandman, who helps Jollywood go to sleep, and Sunny the morning sprite, who helps wake everyone up. The 7D head to the land of Nod to try to rescue them before morning, or else everyone including Grumpy will miss the first annual Breakfast Brouhaha-haha. Guest star: Amy Sedaris as Nocturna
26b	2b	"The Great Glitterpillar"	Charles Visser	Shea Fontana	Charles Visser	January 30, 2016	202	0.39
After looking for a Jumbo Gem in the magical forest to complete their spell, the Glooms unintentionally disrupt a Glitterpillar, who heads towards Jollywood in search of gems and ends up in The 7D's mine. The 7D capture it, but it escapes and goes after Queen Delightful's gems. Hildy uses the Jumbo Gem to turn into a sixty-foot tall giantess.
27a	3a	"Oh Happy Grumpy"	Charles Visser	Paul Rugg	Charles Visser	February 6, 2016	201	0.35
When Grumpy insults a woman for blocking their way and letting his cheese statue melt, she returns to put a curse on him where he will turn into a pile of cheese if he ever acts grumpy again.
27b	3b	"Funniest Haircut Day"	Alfred Gimeno	Sherri Stoner	Alfred Gimeno	February 6, 2016	201	0.35
Everyone in Jollywood is looking forward to Funniest Haircut Day, except for Grumpy, who plans on hiding in the woods and waiting the day out, but Bashful goes after him and is always one step ahead of him when it comes to hiding. Meanwhile, the Glooms pose as barbers to collect hair from everybody in Jollywood for a spell to turn them all into rubble.
28a	4a	"Say Pest to the Dress"	Alfred Gimeno	Dean Batali & Deanna Oliver	Barry Caldwell	February 20, 2016	204	0.40
Queen Delightful has Lord Starchbottom get her dress in preparation to be the grand marshal of the evening's Jollystreet Parade. When Starchbottom discovers woodland animals in the queen's closet, he reluctantly calls The 7D (minus Dopey, who is on another mission), who manage to take the pests out of the castle. However, the Glooms bring in more pests in the form of rats, so Grumpy calls the Pied Piper, who has the 7D play a tune to lead the rats away, but Starchbottom finds that the woodland creatures have returned. It turns out the animals are Delightful's clothing designers, and she is able to make it to the parade.
28b	4b	"Delight Me, Delight Me Not"	Charles Visser	Mark Drop & Sherri Stoner	Kris Wimberly	February 20, 2016	204	0.40
Bashful accidentally sends a map that leads to the Delightnotium gem to his pen pal, who turns out to be Grim. The Glooms plan to find the gem and to make Queen Delightful hideous during her yearly address to the kingdom, so it's up to Bashful to stop the Glooms before Delightful is not so delightful.
29a	5a	"Whose Voice is it Anyway?"	Charles Visser	Sherri Stoner & Deanna Oliver	Douglas McCarthy	February 27, 2016	205	0.34
Fed up with Happy's incessant singing, Grumpy makes a wager with Happy that if he can go a whole day without singing, the loser has to make the winner a thousand pancakes. Happy goes to Echo Canyon, a place where he can lose his voice and it stays there for the next twenty-four hours thanks to Echo Canyon. He wins the bet, but is unable to speak. When he returns, the pixies assisting the King of Echoes have mixed his voice with that of Grim. Hildy plans on using this to their advantage to get rid of the Queen, while Happy ends up with Grim's voice. Guest star: Petros Papadakis as King of Echoes
29b	5b	"Take Your Pet to Lunch Day"	Alfred Gimeno	Paul Dini	Kris Wimberly	February 27, 2016	205	0.34
It is Take Your Pet to Lunch Day in the kingdom of Jollywood, and everybody is bringing a pet, except for Sneezy, who is allergic to almost every kind of animal. In the forest, Sneezy discovers a rare featherless and hairless griffin, whom he names "Sniffy" and brings to the lunch. Meanwhile, the Glooms plan to sneak into the lunch and use obedience powder to take over Jollywood.
30a	6a	"Giggleberries"	Alfred Gimeno	Sherri Stoner	Kyle Menke	March 5, 2016	206	0.39
In preparation for Queen Delightful's serious award ceremony, the 7D pick giggleberries. Happy eats one too many and starts giggling like crazy, While Grumpy and Dopey set off to retrieve I've-Got-the-Blues berries, the other 7D try to contain Happy's laughing.
30b	6b	"Jolleyball Anyone?"	Charles Visser	Mark Drop	Mark Maxey	March 5, 2016	206	0.39
Fed up from hearing the Gnome King brag about how his Jollyball team always beats Jollywood's team, Queen Delightful makes a wager where if the gnome kingdom wins, she will surrender the kingdom to the gnomes. The queen recruits The 7D to participate, and the renowned Jollyball Coach Coachy. Guest star: Jim Belushi as Coach Coachy
31a	7a	"Miss Fortune Teller"	Alfred Gimeno	Shea Fontana	Barry Caldwell	March 12, 2016	207	0.32
Hildy dresses up as a fortune teller, and uses Crystal Ball to make accurate predictions to the citizens of Jollywood, thanks to Grim's background actions to make them true. When Hildy tells Grumpy's fortune, she warns that something terrible will happen to Queen Delightful unless they meet. Hildy predicts that a tornado will destroy Jollywood, unless the queen goes on a journey around the world while trekking backwards and gives the crown to Hildy, so the 7D split up, and part of the group rescues the queen while the other group uses their own fortune teller to trick the Glooms.
31b	7b	"Grump-Tiki"	Jeff Gordon	Tom Ropelewski, Sherri Stoner, Deanna Oliver	Douglas McCarthy	March 12, 2016	207	0.32
Grumpy sets sail to find Le Fromage de Gross Pew, the smelliest cheese in the world. The Glooms tag along in an attempt to use the stinky cheese to stink Queen Delightful out of the castle. After almost two weeks, they realize they are still tied at the port, but eventually reach the island, which has a volcano that spits out cheese. Grumpy finds Le Fromage de Gross Pew, but triggers a series of booby-traps. The Glooms steal the cheese and bring it to the queen, but she remarks she likes the cheese, revealing that she was just kidding and letting Grumpy have the cheese once the Glooms leave.
32a	8a	"You Ain't Seen Nothin' Yeti!"	Charles Visser	Tom Rodgers & Sherri Stoner	Mark Maxey	March 19, 2016	208	0.37
Happy takes over for a nervous singing telegram man. Unfortunately, the telegram he delivers is an anniversary song from Grim to Hildy, but Happy decides to rewrite the song Grim wrote for Hildy, which he thought was too depressing. When he delivers the song, The Glooms are not at all pleased, so Hildy banishes Happy's voice to Mount Jollywood and turns him into a mime. When the rest of the 7D find out, they demand that the Glooms give Happy's voice back, but all of them except Grumpy are turned into mimes, too. The 7D now have to climb Mount Jollywood and get their voices back in order to help open Queen Delightful's new voice command safe that only works when the 7D say their names.
32b	8b	"Which Witch is Which?"	Charles Visser	Randy Rogel	Kris Wimberly	March 19, 2016	208	0.37
When Hildy gets a new duplicating wand, she tells Grim not to let anything happen to it, including having himself use it, which he does, but in return makes a duplicate of Hildy who takes over Jollywood and locks the 7D, Queen Delightful, Lord Starchbottom, and the Glooms in the dungeon. Now, the Glooms and the 7D have to work together to take back the throne.
33a	9a	"The Family Pickles"	Charles Visser	Paul Rugg & Sherri Stoner	Kris Wimberly	May 7, 2016	209	0.37
When a pickle shortage plagues Jollywood, The 7D travel to the Gerkin Family's pickle farm to help save the day and they learn something secret about Lord Starchbottom in the process.
33b	9b	"Chicken Soup for the Troll"	Alfred Gimeno	Sindy Boveda Spackman	Kevin Frank	May 7, 2016	209	0.37
When the Queen comes down with a case of Yodeladyflu, The 7D set off to retrieve the cure which is Jollywood Jane's chicken soup which was stolen by trolls who also have the Yodeladyflu.
34a	10a	"Dr. Jingleheimer"	Jeff Gordon	Sherri Stoner & Mark Drop	Phillip Mosness	May 14, 2016	210	0.30
While picking flowers late at night, Doc is captured by the evil scientist Dr. Jingleheimer who plans on using Doc's hat to shrink all of Jollywood for his model train set. Happy and Grumpy try to rescue him, but Doc's hat also has a mind of its own.
34b	10b	"The Enchanted Forest Ranger"	Charles Visser	Sherri Stoner	Douglas McCarthy	May 14, 2016	210	0.30
Grumpy is determined to earn a Dragon Scout badge and become Dragon Scout First Class, but he must complete a bunch of tasks including spending the night in the Enchanted Forest. The 7D try to help out but a rule-crazed forest ranger named Dirk Dumphrey interrupts their every action and hands them all sorts of citations and punishments. However, it drives the rest crazy, including Sneezy. Guest star: Phil Hendrie as Dirk Dumphrey
35a	11a	"Take Me To Your Grumpy"	Alfred Gimeno	John P. McCann, Deanna Oliver & Sherri Stoner	Kevin Frank	May 21, 2016	211	0.30
While trying to draw in a gigantic gem from space, Hildy accidentally attracts a carrot-shaped space ship containing two beet-shaped aliens. Although they plan to take over the planet, they act too nice to be taken seriously until they see an assertive Grumpy who teaches them how to get what they want. The aliens end up applying this to reclaim their original planet.
35b	11b	"Nicely Done and The 7D"	Jeff Gordon & Mr. Warburton	Deanna Oliver & Mark Drop	Barry Caldwell and Kyle Menke	May 21, 2016	211	0.30
On their way back home from a miners' convention, The 7D get lost and are attacked by the evil Sheriff of Plottingham. Dopey is captured, but the rest meet a Robin Hood-type guy named Nicely Done whose Merry Men-type group called the Really Nice Guys are also captured. They team up to rescue Dopey and the Really Nice Guys. Guest star: Rob Paulsen as Nicely Done and Jeff Bennett as Sheriff of Plottingham
36a	12a	"Smarty Tooth"	Charles Visser	Sindy Boveda Spackman Sherri Stoner & Deanna Oliver	Mark Maxey	July 2, 2016	TBA	0.24
Doc wakes up one morning with a bad toothache and soon finds out his smarty tooth is loose. He goes to the dentist to get it taken out by Dr. Sweet Tooth. Without the tooth, he completely loses his intelligence. Doc is told if he puts his tooth under his pillow, the tooth fairy will come and bring him a new smarty tooth - which he needs because Queen Delightful needs help with a complicated math problem that only Doc can solve. Things get complicated, however when the Glooms steals Doc's smarty tooth so he can remain a dunce forever, so now The 7D have to get Doc's tooth back before dawn or else he'll be an idiot forever. Guest star: George Takei as Dr. Sweet Tooth
36b	12b	"Surely, You Jest"	Alfred Gimeno	Micheal Loprette	Phillip Mosness	July 2, 2016	TBA	0.24
When Lord Starchbottom gets overwhelmed by his duties in the castle, the Queen decides to hire more people to help around with Starchy's jobs with the 7D taking applicants with disastrous results. The role for jester hasn't been filled in yet. The Glooms take advantage of this opportunity. With help from the Crystal Ball, the Glooms perform the job audition as a chance to sneak into the castle and steal the priceless Hubba Hubba Headpiece, a crown which will make anybody who looks at it worship the wearer.
37a	13a	"Hop to It, Dopey!"	Mr. Warburton & Jeff Gordon	Sindy Boveda Spackman & Sherri Stoner	Kris Wimberly	July 9, 2016	TBA	0.24
When a crazy rabbit named Little Bunny Foo Foo starts going on a hopping spree and hitting field mice over the head with a mallet, Queen Delightful calls on the 7D to take care of the wounded mice. She lets Dopey try to reason with the cantankerous little rabbit which doesn't work and leads to a chase that takes Dopey, Foo Foo and a mouse to the castle of an evil sorcerer (Note: The sorcerer in "Hop to It, Dopey" is based on "The Sorcerer's Apprentice" segment in Fantasia, in which the original Dopey was going to appear.) who hates dwarves and likes to cook them up into pies. While trying to once again calm Foo Foo down, Dopey finds the sorcerer's hat and uses that to seize the bunny's hopping, but doesn't work and Dopey only succeeds in making the situation worse by making clones of Bunny Foo Foo and make them huge. So now the 7D have to stop the rabbits before the mouse bopping continues and undo what Dopey caused.
37b	13b	"What Are You, Five?"	Alfred Gimeno	Randy Rogel, Sherri Stoner and Deanna Oliver	Jordan Koch, Marcelo DeSouza, and Kexx Singleton	July 9, 2016	TBA	0.24
Finally fed up with the 7D for stopping her plans and making her look like a laughingstock among the witch community, Hildy tries to get rid of them once and for all, but evidently turns them into five-year-olds which the Glooms use to their advantage.
38a	14a	"Bedknobs and Gloomsticks"	Charles Visser	Deanna Oliver and Mark Drop	Douglas McCarthy	July 16, 2016	TBA	0.25
When the castle gets infested with termites, Queen Delightful and Lord Starchbottom are forced to stay with The 7D at their cottage as the Queen desperately needs a nap. Since their cottage is too tiny for normal-sized people, the 7D decide to make the Queen a full-size bed she can nap in. Meanwhile, the Glooms, who were responsible for the termite infestation, take over the castle. Now they have to deal with their own termites.
38b	14b	"Take Care of Your Elf!"	Alfred Gimeno	Sherri Stoner	Kevin Frank	July 16, 2016	TBA	0.25
When Grumpy offends all the elves in Jollywood for "messing" up his hat, this makes them quit their jobs. Grumpy along with Doc set off into the enchanted forest to make up with the elves and their king who was going to be crowded by the Queen, but can't thanks to Grumpy. Meanwhile, the rest of the 7D try to take over for all the elves' work including hat making. Guest star: Cheri Oteri as Gingersnaps
39a	15a	"Game of Grumpy"	Charles Visser	Michael Loprette	Mark Maxey	July 23, 2016	TBA	0.22
Grumpy gets invited to his family reunion in his home country of Grumpelvania. Unfortunately, he fibs to his kingly cousin King Groucharooney about being the leader of the 7D and the hero who always saves the day. This is bad since now Grumpy has to stop a legion of ice monsters from turning the kingdom to ice. Grumpy begrudgingly calls the rest of the 7D to help. Guest star: Jay Mohr as King Groucharooney, Tress MacNeille as Ginorma.
39b	15b	"The 7D and the Beast"	Alfred Gimeno	Sindy Boveda Spackman	Barry Caldwell and Mark Maxey	July 23, 2016	TBA	0.22
When the Queen finds out her friend Baroness BonBon isn't coming to her candy ball, she fears something terrible has happened to her. So she sends the 7D to find out what happened to her, and things get "beastly" from there. Guest star: Candi Milo as Baroness BonBon.
40a	16a	"Bummer Vacation"	Jeff Gordon	Deanna Oliver and Shea Fontana	Douglas McCarthy	July 30, 2016	TBA	0.29
Hildy was looking forward to a nice vacation at a beach resort with her parents, the Drears, in order to get away from the 7D. Unfortunately, Hildy finds out the 7D are at the same resort and she wants them gone. To make things worse, the 7D don't want to leave since Sneezy won the trip by winning a game show. So in order to decide who leaves, Hildy and Happy compete in a karaoke contest with the loser having to leave the resort. Meanwhile, Hildy's dad - the Duke of Drear - thinks Grumpy is Rumpelstiltskin and wants to claim Hildy, especially when Grumpy wants Duke's shrimp cocktail sauce. Guest stars: Sharon and Ozzy Osbourne as Duke and Duchess of Drear
40b	16b	"They Growl By Night"	Charles Visser	Deanna Oliver, Mark Drop, Paul Dini, Paul Rugg and Tom Ruegger	Mark Maxey, Kirk Hanson and Kexx Singleton	July 30, 2016	TBA	0.29
In a film noir style, a grizzly bear named Honey asks Dopey to help find her boyfriend Larry which Dopey accepts. Along with Grumpy, they go off to find Larry into Scary Bearritory. After getting a tip that Larry might be at Brrr Lake, as they investigate, a bunch of bears follow them who want a golden treasure. Meanwhile, the rest of the 7D try to get rid of a not-so-jolly bee that is loose in the castle.
41a	17a	"Planks, But No Planks"	Alfred Gimeno	Sindy Boveda Spackman and Deanna Oliver	Kris Wimberly	October 8, 2016	TBA	0.25
With the construction of a new "bark park" done for Sir Yipsalot's bark mitzvah, the 7D forgot to take into account that the park was surrounded by a creek. So, they suggest using a plank to get across, but Doc goes nuts about it due to an incident with a plank bridge which lost them their friend, Stinky. Doc swore never to build another bridge, but for the Queen's sake he does. Unfortunately, Doc assigns the building job to a bunch of shifty trolls, who won't let them cross without paying, so now Doc and the others have to find other ways to cross without them noticing.
41b	17b	"The Jollywood Games"	Alfred Gimeno	Deanna Oliver, Micheal Loprette, Paul Rugg and Randy Rogel	Phillip Mosness	October 8, 2016	TBA	0.25
It's time for the annual Jollywood games, an annual sporting event in Jollywood, and whoever wins the event gets whatever they want from Queen Delightful, but it results in The 7D doing all of the work to fill out the rewards. So they decide to enter the games to win themselves, but little do they know the Glooms (mainly Grim with some magical assistance from Hildy) are entering too in an attempt to win the kingdom from the Queen.
42a	18a	"There's a Monkey in My Hat"	Alfred Gimeno	Deanna Oliver	Kevin Frank	October 15, 2016	TBA	0.22
Queen Delightful's parrot advisor Squire Peckington goes on vacation with Doc and Dopey. As a replacement, Dopey gets a monkey named Nanners to advise the Queen. This causes Hildy to pose as a monkey to advise the queen to make her queen of Jollywood.
42b	18b	"Shapeshifter"	Alfred Gimeno	Deanna Oliver	Phillip Mosness	October 15, 2016	TBA	0.22
An evil villain named the Shapeshifter calls upon the Glooms for assistance on a plan to take over Jollywood, that starts with stealing sapphires from the 7D's mine. This causes Bashful to pose as a secret agent, called Agent Bash, and along the way, he and the 7D try to use a sapphire powered laser to stop Shapeshifter and the Glooms. Guest star: “Weird Al” Yankovic as Shapeshifter
43a	19a	"Once in a Purple Moon"	Jeff Gordon	Deanna Oliver, Sherri Stoner and Sindy Boveda Spackman	Douglas McCarthy	October 29, 2016	TBA	0.28
Once every seven years, the moon goes through a rainbow phase where it changes colors, ultimately leading to a "triple-color full moon all the way." So Doc and The 7D go to Starchbottoms cabin in the woods to take a look at this cosmic event, but unfortunately, a strange thing is happening: when the moon is changing colors, it causes the 7D to transform into strange creatures, including Happy and Grumpy.
43b	19b	"Water Ya Doin', Dopey?"	Charles Visser	Micheal Loprete	Kexx Singleton	October 29, 2016	TBA	0.28
After Hildy casts a spell to turn the Queen old so she could take over Jollywood, she also turns herself old, so now The 7D - with the help of Dopey's water detector - need to get Queen Delightful to the mythical fountain of youth to undo the effects of the spell.
44a	20a	"A Royal Pain in the Castle"	Alfred Gimeno	Paul Dini	Kirk Hanson and Mark Maxey	November 5, 2016	TBA	0.20
When Queen Delightful goes out for the day, she puts Grumpy in charge of the kingdom, which proves to be a mistake as he gets drunk with power and constantly rings the bing bong bell driving the rest of the 7D (except for Happy and Dopey) crazy. To make things even worse, thanks to traffic, the Queen is late coming home for the annual peace treaty signing with the Gnome King, so now Grumpy has to take care of the peace ceremony, with disastrous results.
44b	20b	"A Sneeze in Time"	Charles Visser	Brad Rozman	Kevin Frank	November 5, 2016	TBA	0.20
Thanks to Grumpy's Chilipeeney Peppereenie cheese, Sneezy starts sneezing himself and the rest of The 7D to the future, where in one week Hildy takes over Jollywood with evil geese. Now the 7D have to go back in time and stop this from occurring, but they keep jumping back and forth from the past and into the future. Note: In-between the two episodes is a music video called "I'm Not Very Nice" performed by Hildy Gloom, singing about how she enjoys being mean.
