= How to Meet Girls =

Studio album by Nerf Herder
- Released: 2000
- Genre: Pop punk
- Length: 31:48
- Label: Honest Don's
- Producer: Joey Cape

Nerf Herder chronology
Nerf Herder (1996)	How to Meet Girls (2000)	My E.P. (2000)

How to Meet Girls is the second album by Nerf Herder. It was released in 2000 on Honest Don's Records.

"Courtney" was written about Courtney Love, containing humorous references to her life. "Jonathan" is based on the life of Jonathan Richman.

== Critical reception ==
Professional ratings
Review scores
Source	Rating
AllMusic	3/5 stars
The Encyclopedia of Popular Music	3/5 stars
Kerrang!	4/5 stars
Reno Gazette Journal	3/4 stars

Exclaim! wrote that "on song after song, front man/brain trust Parry Gripp makes clever self-deprecating references all set to some pretty darn catchy pop-punk." The Pitch called the album "irresistible," writing: "Packed with amazing hooks and quotable lyrics, How To Meet Girls is a reminder of how amusing pop can be, delivered with a complete lack of rock-star cockiness." The A.V. Club thought that "Nerf Herder's winking self-satisfaction would be forgivable if the songs were catchier (like, say, Harvey Danger's smug but infectious 'Flagpole Sitta'), but How To Meet Girls is as melodically forgettable as it is lyrically hard to stomach." The Hartford Courant wrote that "the wordplay is moderately more clever than the Bloodhound Gang, but it's the kind of thing you'll throw out once you mature and get into ninth grade."

== Track listing ==
All songs written by Parry Gripp, except for "Pantera Fans in Love" and "For You", by Dave Ehrlich.

No.	Title	Length
1.	"Vivian"	2:46
2.	"Courtney"	2:47
3.	"Lamer Than Lame"	3:37
4.	"Feeling Bad"	2:20
5.	"Pantera Fans in Love"	3:20
6.	"5000 Ways to Die"	2:59
7.	"She's a Sleestak"	3:20
8.	"Jonathan"	2:19
9.	"For You"	1:58
10.	"Life on Mars"	3:42
11.	"Pervert"	2:38

== Personnel ==
- Parry Gripp – vocals, guitar
- Justin Fisher – bass
- Steve Sherlock – drums, vocals
- Dave Ehrlich – guitar
