= Nerf Herder IV =

Studio album by Nerf Herder
- Released: April 29, 2008
- Genre: Pop punk, alternative rock
- Length: 39:02
- Label: Oglio
- Producer: Angus Cooke

Nerf Herder chronology
American Cheese (2002)	Nerf Herder IV (2008)	Rockingham (2016)

Professional ratings
Review scores
Source	Rating
AllMusic	3/5 stars
Punknews.org	3.5/5 stars
ThePunkSite.com	4.5/5 stars
Cosmos Gaming	

Nerf Herder IV is the fourth studio album by the rock band Nerf Herder. It was released in 2008 through Oglio Records.

== Track listing ==
No.	Title	Length
1.	"Oh Me, Oh My"	3:35
2.	"Golfshirt, Part 2"	2:27
3.	"High School Reunion"	3:31
4.	"WTC #7"	3:14
5.	"Dianalee"	2:10
6.	"Crocodile"	3:38
7.	"(Stand By Your) Manatee"	2:44
8.	"Garage Sale"	5:50
9.	"Led Zeppelin Rules"	3:48
10.	"Dance"	1:45
11.	"I'm Not A Loser"	4:11
12.	"The Backpack Song"	2:39
13.	"Affirmative Action"	4:00
