= Rockingham (album) =

Studio album by Nerf Herder
- Released: March 11, 2016
- Studio: The Lair; New Monkey; Skywalker Sound; Orange Whip; The Tackle Box
- Genre: Pop punk
- Length: 37:34
- Label: Golfshirt
- Producer: Nerf Gerder

Nerf Herder chronology
| Nerf Herder IV (2008) | Rockingham (2016) |

Professional ratings
Review scores
| Source | Rating |
|---|---|
| Punknews.org | 4/5 stars |

Rockingham is the fifth album by Nerf Herder, released in March 2016.

The album was crowdfunded using PledgeMusic. It was released digitally, on CD, and on Vinyl. There was a release party April 8, 2016, at the Troubadour (West Hollywood, California), Allie Goertz was a special guest.

== Track listing ==
| No. | Title | Length |
|---|---|---|
| 1. | "Portland" | 2:57 |
| 2. | "At the Con" | 2:55 |
| 3. | "The Girl Who Listened to Rush" | 3:47 |
| 4. | "Allie Goertz" | 4:08 |
| 5. | "We Opened for Weezer" | 4:29 |
| 6. | "Jackie Got Married" | 2:23 |
| 7. | "I'm the Droid (You're Looking For)" | 3:36 |
| 8. | "Ghostbusters III" | 2:40 |
| 9. | "Doctor Who" | 2:44 |
| 10. | "Stock Photo Girl" | 5:07 |
| 11. | "Close Your Eyes and Dream" | 2:48 |

== Personnel ==
Nerf Herder

- Parry Gripp – vocals, guitar
- Ben Pringle – bass, vocals
- Linus Dotson – guitar, vocals
- Steve Sherlock – drums

Technical

- Produced by Nerf Herder
- Mixed by Jay Ruston
- Mastered by Paul Logus
- Vocal direction and additional production by Angus Cooke

Locations

- Recorded at The Lair, New Monkey, Skywalker Sound, Orange Whip, and The Tackle Box

Additional musicians

- Additional guitars on "At the Con" by Brett "Felix" Ulery and Eric Zerneke
