= The 7D =

American animated television series

- Genre: Adventure; Comedy; Fantasy; Musical
- Created by: Noah Z. Jones
- Based on: Snow White and the Seven Dwarfs by Walt Disney
- Developed by: Shea Fontana
- Directed by: Alfred Gimeno; Jeff Gordon; Charles Visser; Tom Warburton; Kelly Ward (dialogue director)
- Voices of: Kevin Michael Richardson; Maurice LaMarche; Stephen Stanton; Dee Bradley Baker; Scott Menville; Billy West; Bill Farmer; Leigh-Allyn Baker; Paul Rugg; Kelly Osbourne; Jess Harnell
- Theme music composer: Parry Gripp and Tom Ruegger
- Opening theme: "Heigh Ho: Here We Go Now", performed by Parry Gripp
- Ending theme: "Heigh Ho: Here We Go Now" (second version)
- Composers: Parry Gripp; Keith Horn
- Country of origin: United States
- Original language: English
- No. of seasons: 2
- No. of episodes: 44 (87 segments) (list of episodes)

Production
- Executive producer: Tom Ruegger
- Running time: 22 minutes
- Production company: Disney Television Animation (Note: Animation outsourced to Digital eMation, Toon City Animation and Wang Film Productions.)

Original release
- Network: Disney XD
- Release: July 7, 2014 – November 5, 2016

The 7D is an American animated television series produced by Disney Television Animation, which premiered on Disney XD on July 7, 2014. It is a re-imagining of the title characters from the 1937 film Snow White and the Seven Dwarfs by Walt Disney Animation Studios. The first season consists of 24 episodes. On December 2, 2014, the series was renewed for a second season. On April 25, 2016, Disney XD announced that the series would be cancelled after two seasons. The show aired its final episode on November 5, 2016, with 44 episodes produced.

== Episodes ==
Season	Segments	Episodes	Originally released	
Season	Segments	Episodes	First released	Last released
1	47	24	July 7, 2014	September 12, 2015
2	40	20	January 23, 2016	November 5, 2016

== Characters ==
=== The 7D ===
The 7D is a group of dwarves who protect Jollywood from the Glooms and other threats. They are the descendants of the dwarves that founded Jollywood. The members of the 7D are:

- Happy (voiced by Kevin Michael Richardson) – Richardson said that he drew inspiration from fellow voice actor Jim Cummings with a "country / New Orleans" voice where he is "always upbeat, always positive," and as "if someone just handed him a beer". Ruegger said that Richardson was the first one of the seven members to be cast, and that his voice set the tone for casting the others.
- Bashful (voiced by Billy West) – West describes Bashful as a sweet character who tries to catch up to the others. He also likes that Bashful has another side to him.
- Doc (voiced by Bill Farmer) invents things, including the sky buckets transportation system for all of Jollywood. Farmer has been the voice of Goofy, and also Sleepy in other Snow White and the Seven Dwarfs projects. Farmer said that in making a new take on Doc, he pinches his voice and makes him a little scatterbrained.
- Dopey (vocal effects provided by Dee Bradley Baker) communicates with whistles, animal sounds, and visual gags. Baker said that portraying Dopey was easier and allows for more freedom because he uses only animal sounds and whistles.
- Grumpy (voiced by Maurice LaMarche) – In voicing Grumpy, LaMarche drew inspiration from his friend who is a stockbroker, as well as parts of Danny DeVito's character Louie De Palma from Taxi and Jason Alexander's character George Costanza from Seinfeld.
- Sleepy (voiced by Stephen Stanton) – In an interview with Variety, Scott Menville said that Stanton came up with over fifty different ways to snore.
- Sneezy (voiced by Scott Menville) – Menville himself had amsneezia whenever voicing this runny-nosed dwarf.

=== The Glooms ===
- Hildy Gloom (voiced by Kelly Osbourne) is a witch and Grim's wife. Hildy is Osbourne's first major voiceover role; Osbourne was asked after Disney had 300 auditions. She said that she had not seen the character design, which was created before the auditions, until after she got the job. She describes Hildy as "bad with the best intentions" and calls her "my alter ego – my Sasha Fierce".
- Grim Gloom (voiced by Jess Harnell) is a warlock and Hildy's husband. Harnell describes him as "a bad-at-being-bad guy". Regarding his role as a Disney villain, he said that "there's a fine line — especially in 7D, which is a broad comedy — because you don't want to scare little kids".

=== Jollywood characters ===
- Queen Delightful (voiced by Leigh-Allyn Baker) is the naive and ditzy ruler of Jollywood.
- Lord Starchbottom (voiced by Paul Rugg) is Queen Delightful's assistant. In portraying Starchbottom, Rugg drew inspiration from Jerry Lewis, whom he and series head writer Ruegger both admire.

=== Recurring characters ===
- Magic Mirror (voiced by Whoopi Goldberg) serves Queen Delightful and resides in the castle's treasure room.
- Crystal Ball (voiced by Jay Leno) is an artifact the Glooms use to spy on Queen Delightful.
- Sir Yipsalot (vocal effects provided by Bill Farmer) is Queen Delightful's pet dog. His favorite treat is pickles.
- Squire Peckington (vocal effects provided by Dee Bradley Baker) is Queen Delightful's pet parrot who is seen perching in her crown.
- Snazzy Shazam (voiced by Leigh-Allyn Baker) is a witch who was Hildy Gloom's rival in school. She frequently competes in the witch contests where Hildy feels like she needs to upstage her.
- Peaches is a slow-moving warthog who pulls the Glooms' carriage.
- Giselle (vocal effects provided by Dee Bradley Baker) is Grumpy's pet goat. In the episode "Finders Keepers", Giselle develops a friendly rivalry with Peaches. In the episode "When Pigs Fly", it is revealed that Giselle's last name is Munchen.

== Production ==
The 7D was placed into production in June 2012 for the Disney Junior channel with characters redesigned by Noah Z. Jones (who also made Fish Hooks for Disney before). In an interview with IndieWire, series director Alfred Gimeno said that the pilot episode was done in Flash, but the series was changed to traditional 2D which added production value as Flash was design heavy. The storyboards and pre-production were done at Disney. Animation was produced by Digital eMation in South Korea, Toon City in the Philippines, and Wang Film Productions in Taiwan. Ruegger also said that the 2D is also better suited for the show's style.

The show's theme song and many of the in-episode songs are done by Parry Gripp. He describes the song as "in kind of a punk rock style...It's pretty fast and has guitars and the tone of my voice is a bit nasal and aggressive. But the music in the show really varies." In an interview with Geek Mom, Gripp said that he was asked to pitch song ideas for various Disney shows, and that The 7D clicked with his style. He estimates he wrote about 120 songs for the first season, although many are very short and their styles vary. Composer Keith Horn does the orchestration in the show.

Entertainment journalist Jim Hill has noted that some have related the voice ensemble to Marvel's Avengers since it features actors who have voiced in popular cartoon shows. He also noted how many of the crew have worked on Animaniacs, including Tom Ruegger, Sherri Stoner, Paul Rugg, Deanna Oliver, and Randy Rogel. Among the voice actors, LaMarche had voiced Brain, and Jess Harnell had voiced Wakko. Voice director Kelly Ward said "God forbid if anything were to happen when they were all in one place because the voice-over industry would be dealt a crippling blow". The cast usually recorded in ensembles of two to four characters when possible, with Ruegger editing the timing afterwards for characters that recorded separately.

Scott Menville, who voices Sneezy, said that the show takes place before Snow White was born so the Evil Queen from the film will not be there. He also said it is a contemporary take on the film as the characters are hip to the current generation and its pop culture references. Jevon Phillips of Hero Complex also placed the series 30 years or so before Snow White. Ruegger said that the show's demographic differed from his previous works with Animaniacs and Pinky and the Brain; however, he was also encouraged by Disney Junior to expand the demographic to include parents.

== Broadcast ==
The 7D debuted on July 7, 2014, on Disney XD, on the Disney Junior block on Disney Channel on December 26, and on the Disney Junior channel in 2015. In Canada, the series began broadcast on July 13 on Disney XD. It premiered on Disney Channel in Southeast Asia on September 7. In Australia, Disney XD began broadcasting the series on December 1.

On December 2, 2014, the series was renewed for a second season, where Ruegger planned to make 39 half-hour episodes. The season premiered on Disney XD on January 23, 2016. The series had guest stars like Ozzy and Sharon Osbourne as Hildy's parents, Fran Drescher, Wallace Shawn, Amy Sedaris, Petros Papadakis, Jim Belushi, Kate Micucci, Phil Hendrie, Cheri Oteri, Jay Mohr, Jimmy Weldon, Michael McKean, George Takei and "Weird Al" Yankovic as well as Debbie Reynolds in one of her final roles before she died. On April 25, 2016, co-executive producer Mr. Warburton posted on his blog that the second season would be the series' final season and that the crew would be moving on to other projects. The series finale aired on November 5, 2016.

== Reception ==
The 7D premiere broadcast ranked number 2 overall among Disney XD's animated original-series premieres for kids 2–11 and kids 6–11.

The series received mixed reviews from critics. Brian Lowry of Variety wrote poorly of the show, claiming that it has none of the charm of the source material, and that its plots "fall into a sort of No Kid's Land in terms of age groups". Rob Owen wrote in the Pittsburgh Post-Gazette that the characters were blandly drawn, and that the show was just a chance to capitalize on the film.

The 7D won Outstanding Original Song at the 44th Daytime Creative Arts Emmy Awards. At the Golden Reel Awards 2014, the episodes "Buckets/Frankengloom" received a nomination for Outstanding Achievement in Sound Editing – Sound Effects, Foley, Music, Dialogue and ADR for Short Form Animation Broadcast Media.

== Video games ==
In June 2014, Disney Publishing Worldwide released "The 7D Mine Train", an endless-runner video game where the player chooses one of the redesigned 7D dwarfs as their game avatar to pilot a mine car through various levels of the mine, picking up gems. It is loosely associated with the Seven Dwarfs Mine Train attraction at Walt Disney World which opened in May 2014.

Disney also released an online game on their Disney XD website called "The 7D Dwarf Track Builder" where players can assemble a mine track or sky bucket course according to the dwarfs' specifications.
