= Hoops & Yoyo =

Animated characters

- Hallmark (Hallmark Cards, Hallmark Channel) character
- The main characters from the franchise. From left-to-right: Hoops, Piddles, and Yoyo
- First appearance: 2001
- Last appearance: 2015
- Created by: Bob Holt, Mike Adair
- Voiced by: Bob Holt, Mike Adair

Hoops & Yoyo (stylized as hoops&yoyo) was an animated franchise created by Bob Holt and Mike Adair for Hallmark Cards that lasted from 2001 to 2015. Initially, it was for use on a line of e-cards, but the franchise would later see other releases, including TV movies, games and music albums. The franchise centers around the titular pair in comedic slice-of-life situations.

== History ==
In 2001, Hallmark artist Bob Holt was assigned to create an e-card for the Fourth of July. He modified a character from this short test animation he did in his own spare time called The Adventures Of Green Bunny into a cat for the e-card. The e-card premiered on Hallmark's website soon enough, and Bob eventually got colleague Mike Adair to join him once he began doing more content with who would be called "Pink Kitty" for the time being and added the original green bunny in once he realized the character "needed a pal". The pair weren’t given proper names until 2003. While the franchise was primarily a line of greeting cards, the characters also had their own website that featured animated episodes, an "Ask Hoops & Yoyo" section, desktop and phone wallpapers, audio snippets, IM icons, fan photos, interactive monthly calendars, a blog, a podcast, games, and merchandise available for purchase.

The premise for Hoops & Yoyo mainly centers around the duo in slice-of-life scenarios, along with other minor characters on occasion. The last piece of content produced by the creators for the franchise would be the fourth episode of its podcast in 2015. In June of that year, Bob Holt was let go from Hallmark as part of broader company layoffs. No reason was given to Holt on why he had to be let go other than, according to him, Hoops & Yoyo not fitting into the "humor" that Hallmark wanted. Since then, not much has been done with the franchise by Hallmark aside from card reprints and occasional new greeting cards being produced.

== Characters ==
- Hoops (Mike Adair) – a sassy pink cat who is best friends with Yoyo. He often gets excited and starts yelling and speaking rapidly. He likes coffee, donuts, and his two best friends, Yoyo and Piddles.
- Yoyo (Bob Holt) – a green rabbit who is excitable and prone to mistakes. Yoyo shares the same hyperactive qualities and food preferences as his best friend, Hoops.
- Piddles (Bev Carlson) – a small, blue critter (whose species is left undefined) who is a close friend to Hoops and Yoyo. She has a high-pitched voice and is highly intelligent.
- Chili Bear (Peter Martin) – a grizzly bear who speaks very rarely and was mostly seen on the Hoops and Yoyo website. He appears briefly near the ending of Hoops & Yoyo's Haunted Halloween.
- Marshy (Mike Adair) – Marshy is a marshmallow monster that antagonizes Hoops and Yoyo, and also appears in their nightmares. He sometimes does things wrong, and always talks about him being so large.
- Puck – a purple mouse that is often used as a background character in the website, greeting cards and other merchandise.
- Bluebird – a bluebird that appeared most notably on the Hoops and Yoyo website's homepages.
- Newbie - an orange slug that also appears in the franchise, albeit more rarely.

== Television ==
The characters were featured on the Hallmark Channel in late 2009 through 2010 as part of a programming block titled Hallmark Channel's Movie Night with Hoops & Yoyo. It was the first time that Hallmark Cards and Hallmark Channel collaborated on a project. On November 25, 2011, CBS premiered a Hoops & Yoyo Christmas TV special produced by Hallmark, titled Hoops & Yoyo Ruin Christmas. On October 26, 2012, Hallmark Channel aired a sequel titled Hoops & Yoyo's Haunted Halloween.

== Albums ==
In December 2005, Hallmark released a Hoops & Yoyo holiday CD entitled Jingle Jingle Wiggle. It features both vocal and instrumental music. The CD also had bonus content like a music video for the A Bongo Christmas track. A second CD, entitled One Donut a Day!, was made in collaboration with singer-songwriter Parry Gripp and was released on July 1, 2007. It includes nineteen tracks and a few animated music videos which are accessible by inserting the disc into a PC.
