= Rockingham ministry =

Rockingham ministry may refer to:

- First Rockingham ministry, the British government led by Lord Rockingham from 1765 to 1766
- Second Rockingham ministry, the British government led by Lord Rockingham from March to July 1782
