= Raining Tacos =

Single by Parry Gripp
- Released: June 29, 2012
- Genre: Children's music; novelty
- Length: 1:32
- Songwriter: Parry Gripp
- Producer: Parry Gripp

Music video
- "Raining Tacos - Parry Gripp & BooneBum" on YouTube

"Raining Tacos" is a song by the American musician Parry Gripp. It was released onto streaming services on June 29, 2012. It subsequently appeared on his greatest hits album Parry Gripp Mega-Party (2013).

== History ==
According to Gripp, "Raining Tacos" is his most popular song. It was adapted into a mobile game in 2014. Between 2014 and late 2019, "Raining Tacos" became popular online due to its popularity within Roblox's player base. The song uses the chord progression of Pachelbel's Canon.

"Raining Tacos" was also adapted into a book by HarperCollins in June 2021. It was also featured on This Might be a Podcast. The song, along with "Baby Shark", were used by the West Palm Beach authorities to deter homeless people from staying at a park during the night. Upon hearing of its usage, Gripp requested the city stop using his song and made donations to local homeless shelters.

A Christmas rendition of the song titled "Raining Tacos (On Christmas Eve)" was released on Gripp's album Jingle Burgers – A Parry Gripp Christmas Album (2020).

== Certifications ==
Region	Certification	Certified units/sales
United Kingdom (BPI)	Silver	200,000^{‡}
^{‡} Sales+streaming figures based on certification alone.
