= Tsar (band) =

American musical group

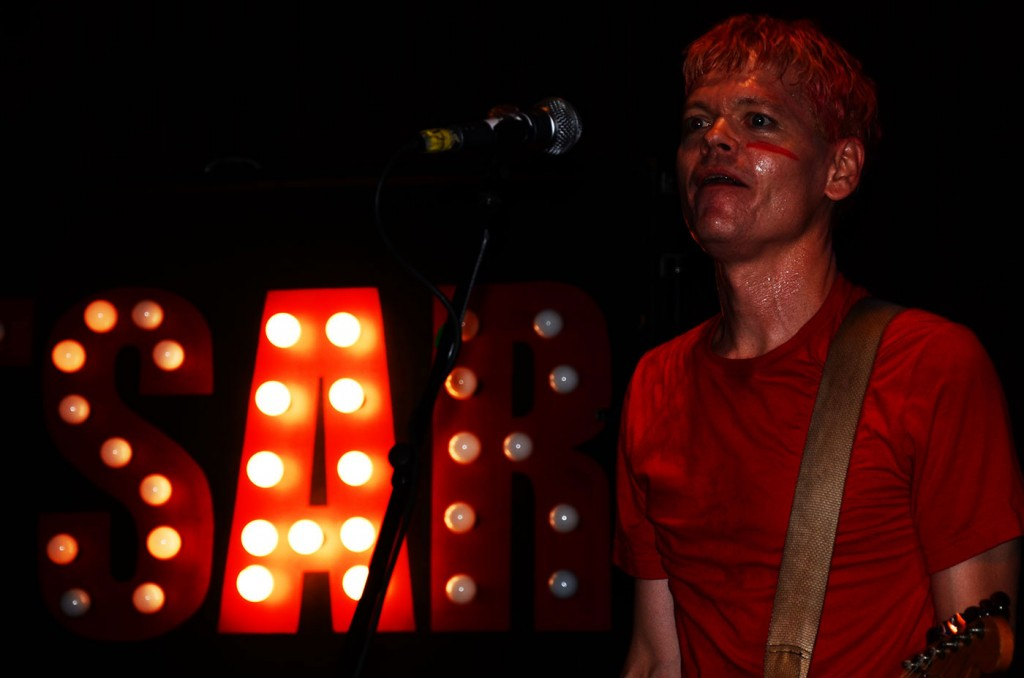

Background information
- Origin: Los Angeles, California, United States
- Genres: Glam rock; power pop
- Years active: 1998–present
- Labels: Hollywood Records; TVT Records; Lojinx
- Spinoff of: Ridel High
- Members: Jeff Whalen; Daniel Kern; Jeff Solomon; Steve Coulter
- Past members: Derrick Forget; Chuck Byler

Tsar is an American rock band from Los Angeles, California, United States, with Jeff Whalen on lead vocals and guitar, Daniel Kern on vocals and guitar, Jeff Solomon on bass, and Steve Coulter on drums. They have released two major-label studio albums, two EPs, and a self-released demos collection. Citing their primary influences as Guns N' Roses and the Monkees, Tsar's music is a hybrid of glam rock, power pop, garage rock, punk rock, arena rock, and bubblegum music.

== Career ==
Tsar formed in 1998. After a monthlong residency at Silver Lake's Spaceland club, they released their self-titled debut on Hollywood Records (2000), produced by Rob Cavallo and mixed by Chris Lord-Alge. The album garnered critical acclaim for its unique music but was a major commercial disappointment that failed to reach any charts. AllMusic describes the album and its fate thus: "Tsar is a bit of a glam pop/hard rock hidden treasure that still sounds fresh and thrilling years later. Loaded with hooks, humor, and innocent charm, and coming across like the starry-eyed child of Cheap Trick and Sweet . . . [t]he album was an exciting, hook-filled modern power pop record that nobody bought, despite (or perhaps because of) the band's subsequent opening slot on a Duran Duran tour."

Director James Gunn used the album's opening track, "Calling All Destroyers," to score the animated opening sequence of his 2010 action film Super.

The band won "Local Album of the Year" and "Local Band of the Year" at the L.A. New Times Music Awards. Rock critic Bob Mehr wrote, "Every song glistens and glimmers with gargantuan hooks and stadium-size riffs . . . With this irresistibly catchy debut—and an onstage presence to match—Tsar is my nominee as the band best equipped to save rock 'n' roll from its postmillennial doldrums."

The band performed on the Late Late Show with Craig Kilborn, The Late Late Show with Craig Ferguson, and Pajama Party. The band's music has also appeared in the TV shows Veronica Mars, Freakylinks, NCIS, Party Down, and the feature film In the Land of Women. The songs "Ordinary Gurl" and "The Girl Who Wouldn't Die" were also featured prominently in the movie American Psycho 2.

Tsar has toured with the New York Dolls, Social Distortion, Eve 6, the Marvelous 3, Duran Duran, Juliette and the Licks, and Nerfherder.

Tsar recorded their followup, Band-Girls-Money, in 2003 with producer David Katznelson (founder of Birdman Records). After leaving Hollywood Records, Tsar released the album on TVT Records in 2005. The title song was included in the soundtrack for the racing games Burnout Revenge and its PSP and DS spin-off Burnout Legends. The band's lineup shifted, with Chuck Byler replacing Steve Coulter on drums and Derrick Forget replacing Jeff Solomon on bass. The band performed in a TV ad for Nestle Crunch Bar and Napster and filmed two videos: "The Love Explosion" and "Band-Girls-Money." The band also appeared on the cover of L.A. Weekly.

In late January 2010, Tsar's original lineup (Whalen/Kern/Solomon/Coulter) reunited. They released The Dark Stuff EP on Aderra Records (US) and LoJinx Records (UK/Europe) and shot a video for "Police Station." In 2011 Tsar self-released The Drugboy Tapes, a collection of early demos and live performances from 1998. A split 7-inch featuring the Olsen Twins song "Pool Party" was released by Aderra Records in March 2012. As of 2026 the band has not released any new albums or toured.

== Albums ==
=== Tsar – 2000 ===
1. Calling All Destroyers
2. I Don't Wanna Break-Up
3. Silver Shifter
4. Kathy Fong Is The Bomb
5. The Teen Wizards
6. MONoSTEReo
7. Afradio, Pt. One & Pt. Two
8. Ordinary Gurl
9. Disappear
10. The Girl Who Wouldn't Die

=== King of the School EP – 2001 ===
1. King of the School (demo)
2. Larger Than Life
3. Silver Shifter (remix)
4. You and Jim Will Hit It Off
5. Songwriter! (live)
6. Afraidio Pt. Two, Pt. Three, and Pt. Four (demo)
7. Smart Boys (demo)

=== Band-Girls-Money – 2005 ===
1. Band-Girls-Money
2. Wanna Get Dead
3. The Love Explosion
4. Superdeformed
5. Straight
6. Wrong
7. Everybody's Fault But Mine
8. Conqueror Worm
9. Startime
10. You Can't Always Want What You Get

=== The Drugboy Tapes (Demos 98) – 2011 ===
1. Afradio
2. The Girl Who Wouldn't Die
3. Ordinary Gurl
4. Kathy Fong Is The Bomb
5. Sun Of Light
6. The Glower
7. I Don't Wanna Break-Up
8. Silver Shifter
9. Calling All Destroyers (Live on KXLU)
10. Monostereo (Live on KXLU)

=== Split 7-Inch – 2012 ===
1. Janitor by Suburban Lawns (Killola)
2. Pool Party by The Olsen Twins (TSAR)

=== The Dark Stuff – EP – 2012 ===
1. Punctual Alcoholic
2. Police Station
3. Little Women
4. White Lipstick
5. Something Bad Happened to Me
