= Parry Gripp =

American musician (born 1967)

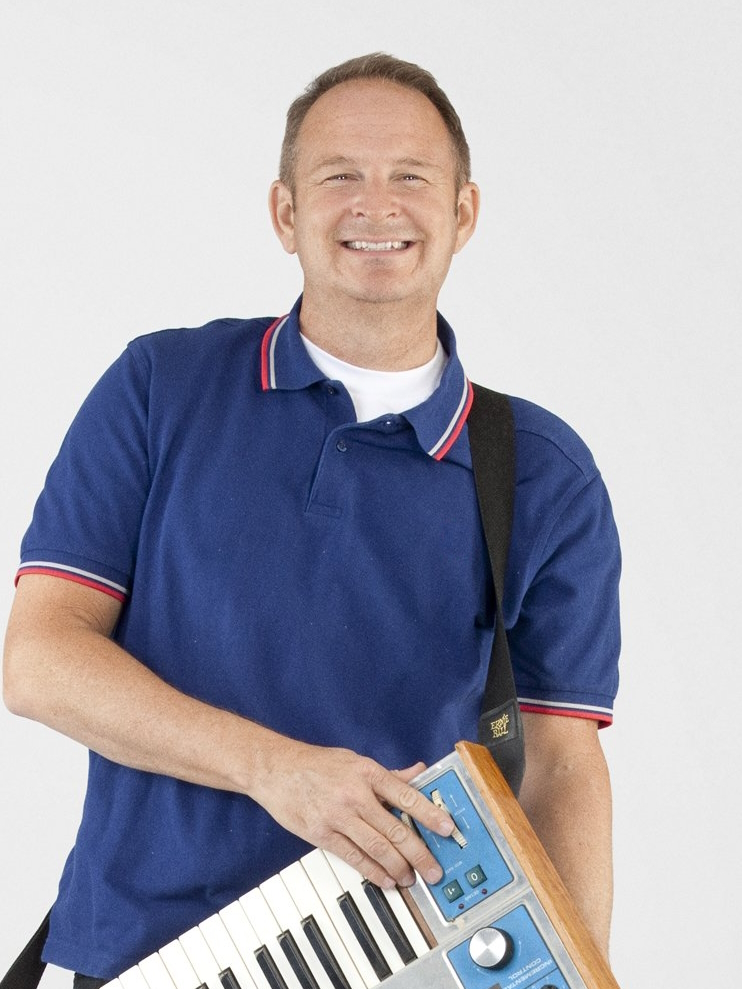
- Gripp in 2016
- Born: Parry Pillsbury Gripp; September 22, 1967 (age 58); Santa Barbara, California, U.S.
- Education: UC Santa Barbara
- Occupations: Songwriter; singer; musician; composer; YouTuber
- Title: Co-owner of Santa Barbara Orchid Estate
- Spouse: Aylene Rhiger
- Awards: Daytime Creative Emmy Award for Outstanding Original Song
- Musical career
- Genres: Rock; geek rock; pop-punk; pop; children's music
- Instruments: Vocals; guitar; ukulele; keyboards; piano; bass; percussion; mixer
- Works: Albums
- Years active: 1994–present
- Label: Oglio
- Member of: Nerf Herder
- Website: parrygripp.com

YouTube information
- Channel: ParryGripp
- Years active: 2006–present
- Subscribers: 1.61 million
- Views: 806.2 million
- Last updated: April 12, 2026

Parry Pillsbury Gripp (born September 22, 1967) is an American songwriter, singer and musician. He has been the lead vocalist and guitarist for the pop-punk band Nerf Herder since its formation in 1994. Gripp writes novelty songs for children, and has been featured on Disney television shows.

== Early life ==
Parry Pillsbury Gripp was born in Santa Barbara on September 22, 1967. His sister Alice and he are co-owners of the Santa Barbara Orchid Estate in Goleta where he grew up. The estate was founded by Robert J. Chrisman in 1957, and was purchased in 1967 by his father Paul Gripp, who helped establish it. Paul Gripp ran the estate until his retirement in 1986. Gripp was enrolled in the College of Creative Studies at University of California, Santa Barbara. In 1994, the band Nerf Herder formed with Gripp as the lead singer and guitarist.

== Style and works ==
=== Nerf Herder songs ===
Gripp's band Nerf Herder performs comedic, juvenile, and pop culture-referencing lyrics coming off the pop-punk movement while pioneering geek rock. Nerf Herder songs use references from various franchises to relate to real-life experiences, like how the song "Ghostbusters III" uses the third installment of the Ghostbusters franchise that was never going to happen as a metaphor for his romantic dreams ever coming true. For instruments, these songs commonly use a typical bass-heavy punk arrangement with integrated synthesizers spread throughout the song. Gripp has collaborated with nerdcore rappers MC Lars and MC Frontalot.

=== False jingles and other novelty songs ===
As a songwriter, Gripp creates fake jingles, as in his 2005 solo album For Those About to Shop, We Salute You – a 51-track concept album mimicking various musical styles as product commercials. It does not have one single concept; it goes through many various concept suites, such as trucks, beer, and insomnia. He also maintained a song-of-the-week website in December 2007 and a YouTube channel on August 12, 2006, in which he creates soundtracks to internet memes, as well as music videos for his own novelty songs.

=== The Wawa and Hallmark connections ===
Along with his false jingles, Gripp also has created some true advertising music, such as a series of Beatles-inspired tunes promoting the Wawa Food Markets' summertime Hoagiefests and songs for the Hallmark Cards e-characters Hoops & Yoyo.

=== Television theme songs ===
Gripp performs theme songs for television programs, including The Super Hero Squad Show, Ben 10: Omniverse, The 7D, and StoryBots Super Songs.

He joined forces with MC Lars to perform some of the vocals, including the chorus to "Guitar Hero Hero (Beating Guitar Hero Doesn't Make You Slash)", a song commenting on the notion that video games like Guitar Hero take kids away from playing in bands and actually learning their instruments.

On July 9, 2009, Gripp debuted a new song called "The Girl at the Video Game Store" for the 1000th episode of the G4 TV program Attack of the Show! The video features the show's hosts Olivia Munn as the title character and Kevin Pereira on drums.

In April 2013, Gripp recorded the song "Backyard Hodge Podge" for the episode of the same name for the children's television show Phineas and Ferb, and he also appeared in the episode in animated form.

In October 2016, Gripp performed and wrote the theme song for the Netflix children's show StoryBots Super Songs, a spin-off for Ask the StoryBots. He also started performing and writing songs for both shows.

Gripp has written songs for two of Vivienne Medrano's adult animated series' pilots: "Inside of Every Demon is a Rainbow" and "Alastor's Reprise" for Hazbin Hotel and "Oh Millie" and "I.M.P Jingle" for its spinoff Helluva Boss. He performed the latter song himself, as well as the song "Monster Fighting Time" for the "Bad Luck Jack" ZooPhobia short, also by Medrano.

=== Children's music ===
Gripp writes songs for children, with over 232 appearing on his YouTube channel, with over 523 million views. He has released five albums for children; Do You Like Waffles?, Fuzzy Fuzzy Cute Cute, Vol. 1, Mega-Party, Jingle Burgers, and For Kids About to Rock.

Between 2014 and late 2019, Gripp's "Raining Tacos" went viral online due to its popularity within Roblox's player base. It was also used by the city of West Palm Beach to deter homeless people from congregating in some areas, along with the song "Baby Shark". Gripp requested they remove his title from their playlist and made donations to local homeless shelters. "It's Raining Tacos" was featured in an Amazon.com ad which began airing in early May 2017.

== Recurring themes ==
The William Shatner character Captain Kirk from the Star Trek franchise holds a special significance in Gripp's songs with Nerf Herder. For example, he dresses like Kirk in the video for the song "Mr. Spock", in which the lyrics of the second verse suggest Captain Kirk is extremely heroic, but girls only want to go out with Mr. Spock. In the song "At the Con" he mentions cosplaying as Kirk at comic book conventions with the lyric "All week I've been slaving like a jerk, now I'm gonna dress like Captain Kirk, beam me up tonight!". Over the course of Nerf Herder's discography, Gripp has also sung about his childhood crush Vivian in the songs "Born Weird" and "Vivian". Another Nerf Herder trope is songs about interest in girls with specific taste in music narrowed down to a genre or band in tracks such as "The Girl Who Listened to Rush", "Pantera Fans in Love" and "New Wave Girl".

In his solo releases, Gripp's songs are commonly about animals and food, though some food and animals in a series of songs collected in Gripp's Spotify playlists such as "The Raining Tacos Saga" (featuring songs "Raining Tacos", "TacoBot 3000", and "Quesadilla Explosion", all songs about Mexican food) and "Scary Parry Gripp Halloween Playlist" (featuring songs like "Zombies Want Your Candy", "Haunted Cupcake" and "Frankenturtle", all songs that relate a spooky Halloween element to animals or food).

== Awards and nominations ==
Year	Category	Work	Result
2015	Daytime Emmy for Outstanding Original Song - Main Title and Promo	"7D Main Title Song"	Nominated
2015	Daytime Emmy for Outstanding Original Song	"Jollywood Spa Song" (episode: "New Shoe")	Nominated
2017	Daytime Emmy for Outstanding Original Song	"I'm Not Very Nice" (episode: "A Royal Pain in the Castle/A Sneeze in Time")	Won

== Discography ==
- For Those About to Shop, We Salute You (2005)
- Do You Like Waffles? (2008)
- Jingle Burgers – A Parry Gripp Christmas Album (2020)
