= Nerf Herder =

American rock band

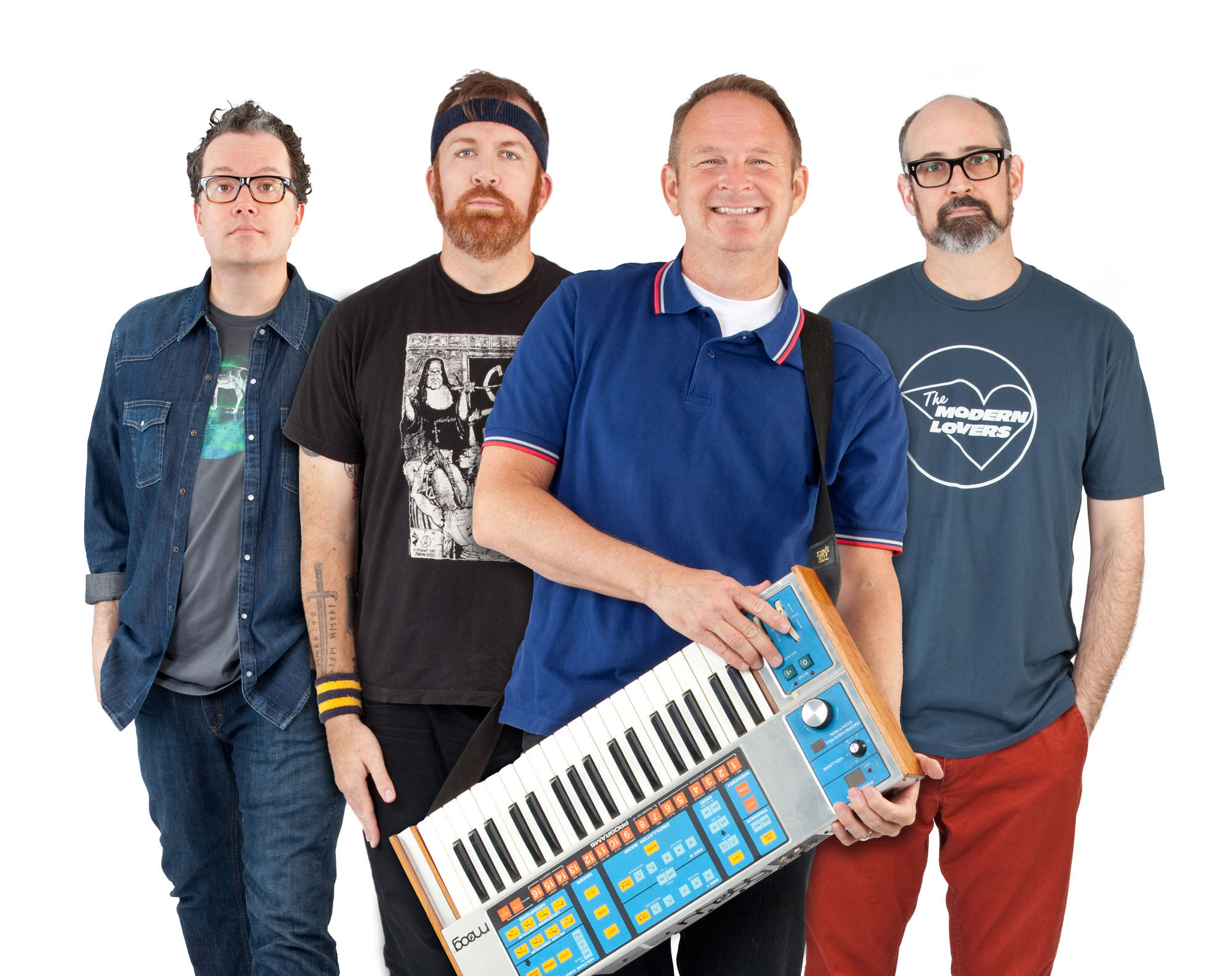
- Nerf Herder in 2016 (L–R) Ben Pringle (bass); Linus of Hollywood (guitar, keyboard); Parry Gripp (vocals, guitar); Steve Sherlock (drums)

Background information
- Origin: Santa Barbara, California, U.S.
- Genres: Pop punk; geek rock; alternative rock
- Years active: 1994–2003; 2006–present
- Labels: My; Arista; Honest Don's; Oglio; Golfshirt; Fat Wreck
- Members: Parry Gripp; Steve Sherlock; Ben Pringle; Linus of Hollywood
- Past members: Charlie Dennis; Dave Ehrlich; Pete Newbury; Marko 72; Justin Fisher
- Website: nerfherder.com

Nerf Herder is an American rock band from Santa Barbara, California, formed in 1994 by Parry Gripp (vocals, guitar), Charlie Dennis (bass), and Steve Sherlock (drums). They describe themselves as a "geek rock" band, and are known for simple modern punk-style songs with frequently humorous, juvenile, and pop-culture-referencing lyrics.

The band's name is a reference to a line of dialogue between Princess Leia and Han Solo in Star Wars: Episode V – The Empire Strikes Back.

Their 1997 single "Van Halen", a tribute to the band of the same name, received significant radio airplay and led to their first major record deal with Arista Records. They also composed and performed the theme music to the television series Buffy the Vampire Slayer.

== History ==
Nerf Herder was formed in Santa Barbara in 1994 by Parry Gripp (vocals, guitar), Charlie Dennis (bass), and Steve Sherlock (drums). Dennis left the band after the release of their debut self-titled album, and was replaced first by Pete Newbury, with Dave Ehrlich also joining as a second guitarist. Newbury's tenure touring with the band was short-lived. He was briefly replaced in 1999 by bassist Marko 72, and then by Justin Fisher, who played bass and keyboards on two albums (How To Meet Girls & American Cheese).

In 1999, Nerf Herder asked Arista to release them from their contract so that they could move forward with a new record, How to Meet Girls, with Honest Don's Records, a subsidiary of Fat Wreck Chords. A special EP for My Records (run by Joey Cape from Lagwagon) titled My EP was released in 2001, and was followed in 2002 by their album American Cheese.

The band wrote and performed the theme song for the TV series Buffy the Vampire Slayer (1997). In April 2003, Nerf Herder appeared as the musical guest in the final-season Buffy episode "Empty Places", being the last band to play at The Bronze. Their special connection to the series was further acknowledged in the dialogue, as "Rock City News" played in the background:

Kennedy: What kind of band plays during an apocalypse?
Dawn: I think this band might actually be one of the signs.

By 2003, after the final American Cheese tour dates—during which time Ben Pringle (also of The Rentals during 2005–2008) had replaced Fisher (who had left amicably to front his own band, Psoma)—the band disintegrated. No official split was announced, but a post by Gripp on the band's website some time afterwards detailed how most of the former band members had gone on to get normal jobs. Gripp did some work as a jingle writer, which led to his 2005 solo album For Those About to Shop, We Salute You, a 51-track concept album mimicking various musical styles and focusing on product commercialization.

In late 2006, Nerf Herder made a surprise comeback, announcing on their website that they were playing a handful of gigs with the original lineup of Gripp, Dennis, and Sherlock. For Gripp's May 7, 2007 review of the day, he announced that the original lineup had finished recording their fourth album, which did not have a title at that time. Gripp stated that he wanted the title to be Brownerton, but the idea was shot down. He also stated that of the thirteen songs recorded, they would probably pick ten to be on the album. In June 2007, the band decided on the title Nerf Herder IV, and the album was released through Oglio Records on April 29, 2008. Pringle returned, and former Size 14 singer Linus of Hollywood joined the live band (playing guitar and keyboard) in early 2008 for a series of West Coast shows and a short tour of Japan.

In 2014, Nerf Herder began working on album number five, titled Rockingham, which was released on March 11, 2016.

As of 2025, Nerf Herder are still actively touring, with shows in the United Kingdom taking place in July.

== Band members ==
Current members

- Parry Gripp – vocals, guitar (1994–2003, 2005–present)
- Steve Sherlock – drums, vocals (1994–2003, 2005–present)
- Ben Pringle – bass, vocals (2002–2003, 2009–present)
- Linus of Hollywood – guitar, keyboards (2008–present)

Former members

- Charlie Dennis – bass, vocals (1994–1998, 2005–2009)
- Dave Ehrlich – guitar (1997–2003)
- Pete Newbury – bass, vocals (1998–1999)
- Justin Fisher – bass, vocals, keyboards (1999–2002)

== Discography ==
Studio albums

- Nerf Herder (1996) My Records/Arista Records
- How to Meet Girls (2000) Honest Don's Records
- American Cheese (2002) Honest Don's Records
- IV (2008) Oglio Records
- Rockingham (2016) Golfshirt Records
- Nerf Herder (redux) (2026) Fat Wreck Chords

Extended plays

- My E.P. (2001) My Records
- High Voltage Christmas Rock (2002) self-released

Singles

Year	Song	US Alt	Album
1996	"Van Halen"	35	Nerf Herder
1997	"Sorry"	—	Nerf Herder
2000	"Courtney"	—	How To Meet Girls
2002	"Mr. Spock"	—	American Cheese
2007	"Led Zeppelin Rules"	—	IV
2016	"At The Con"	—	Rockingham
2016	"Ghostbusters III"	—	Rockingham
2016	"Doctor Who"	—	Rockingham
2022	"Born Weird"	—	Born Weird

Compilation album appearances

The following are songs that have been featured on compilations that have not been released on any of the band's albums or EPs

- Happy Meals: A Smorgasbord of My Fav Songs (1996) My Records – "Sorry" (alt version)
- BASEketball soundtrack (1998) Mojo/Universal – "Don't Hate Me (Because I'm Beautiful)"
- Short Music For Short People (1999) Fat Wreck Chords – "Doin' Laundry"
- Metal Rules: Tribute to Bad Hair Days (1999) Priority Records – "Kiss Me Deadly"
- Buffy the Vampire Slayer: The Album (1999) TVT Records – "Buffy the Vampire Slayer Theme"
- Happy Meals Vol. 2 - The Perfect Marriage (2001) My Records – "Hospital"
- Happy Meals Volume 3 (2002) My Records – "Jacket"
- That Darn Punk Original Motion Picture Soundtrack (2002) Kung Fu Records – "Siegfried and Roy"
- Bad Scene, Everyone's Fault: Jawbreaker Tribute (2003) Dying Wish Records – "Chesterfield King"
- Wrecktrospective (2009) Fat Wreck Chords – "5000 Ways to Die" (demo)
- Have a Crappy Summer (2012) Crappy Records – "I'm the Droid You're Looking For"
- Dog Songs (2017) – "Gary and the Princess"
