= List of Helluva Boss episodes =

List of episodes in the animated series Helluva Boss

Helluva Boss is an American adult animated web and television series created by Vivienne "VivziePop" Medrano. The show is produced by SpindleHorse Toons. The show was initially released exclusively to Medrano's YouTube channel.

Helluva Boss revolves around the employees of I.M.P (Immediate Murder Professionals), an imp-run assassination company in Hell, on their many different jobs. The members of I.M.P include Blitzo, the boss of the venture, along with weapons specialist Moxxie, powerhouse Millie, and his receptionist hellhound/adoptive daughter, Loona. With the help of an ancient book obtained from Stolas, a Goetial demon of Hell, they access the human world to complete their tasks on order from demons in Hell.

The series' pilot was released on November 25, 2019, while the first episode of the first season premiered on October 31, 2020. The show's second season premiered on July 30, 2022. A remake of the pilot was released to Prime Video on September 10, 2025, alongside a re-release of the first two seasons, all of which are fully uncensored. The third season is set to be released in two halves, for a total of 15 episodes; the first premiered on October 14, 2026, and the second half will be released in 2027.

== Series overview ==
Season	Episodes		Originally released		
Season	Episodes		First released	Last released	Network
Pilot			November 25, 2019		YouTube
1	8	7	October 31, 2020	October 31, 2021	YouTube
1	8	1	June 24, 2023 (Note: The final episode of the season was delayed and released in 2023, during the airing of the second season.)		YouTube
2	12		July 30, 2022	December 21, 2024	YouTube
Pilot remake			September 10, 2025		Amazon Prime Video
3	15	7	October 14, 2026	October 28, 2026	Amazon Prime Video
3	15	8	2027	TBA	Amazon Prime Video

== Episodes ==
=== Pilot (2019) ===
Title	Directed by	Written by	Original release date
"Pilot"	Vivienne Medrano	Vivienne Medrano & Brandon Rogers	November 25, 2019
Blitzo (pronounced "Blitz") (voiced by Rogers), an imp, leads an assassination company in Hell alongside his team: his adopted hellhound daughter Loona (voiced by Erica Lindbeck) and a married couple, Moxxie (voiced by Richard Steven Horvitz) and Millie (voiced by Lindbeck). They cater to clients from Hell seeking murders on Earth, strategizing ways to expand their clientele while reflecting on past missions. A mishap occurs when Moxxie mistakenly targets a young boy, injuring him, which prompts a heated debate among the group. Issues within the company surface, including Loona's detachment from her job and Blitzo's stalking of Moxxie and Millie outside work. Additionally, their portal to Earth stems from a grimoire stolen from Stolas (voiced by Brock Baker), a demon, after Blitzo's brief affair with him. The episode concludes with Loona confirming the boy was the correct target after all, which leads Blitzo to shoot him. Despite their differences, the team reconciles while disposing of the body. Musical numbers: "I.M.P Jingle" and "Oh Millie" (end credits); Note: As of November 2023, the pilot is no longer "functionally canon" to the rest of the series.

=== Season 1 (2020–2023) ===
No. overall	No. in season	Title	Directed by	Written by	Original release date
1	1	"Murder Family"	Vivienne Medrano	Vivienne Medrano & Brandon Rogers	October 31, 2020
Mrs. Mayberry, a schoolteacher, discovers her husband's infidelity during a video call set up by her students. In a fit of rage, she fatally shoots her husband and his mistress, Martha, before shooting herself, all of which is witnessed by her horrified students via the still-active video call. Now a demon in Hell, Mrs. Mayberry seeks revenge on Martha, who survived the attack and gained money and sympathy from it. She hires I.M.P to kill Martha. Using the grimoire, they travel to Martha's home, where they accidentally alert her and her family to their presence. The family is revealed to be devil-worshipping cannibals, who capture Moxxie and Millie while Blitzo narrowly escapes. Moxxie shoots Martha dead, but is haunted by guilt over the rest of her family's subsequent demise. Upon returning to Hell, Mrs. Mayberry and the team celebrate the job's completion, with Moxxie still left traumatized. Musical numbers: "Teacher's Song"
2	2	"Loo Loo Land"	Vivienne Medrano	Vivienne Medrano & Brandon Rogers	December 9, 2020
In a flashback, a young Octavia is comforted by her father Stolas after a nightmare. In the present, 17-year-old Octavia witnesses her parents' turbulent divorce sparked by her father's affair with Blitzo. Despite Octavia's reluctance, Stolas insists on taking her to an amusement park called Loo Loo Land, hiring I.M.P as bodyguards to accompany them. At the park, Stolas constantly flirts with Blitzo, making Octavia uncomfortable. During an emotional outburst, Octavia flees, prompting Stolas to pursue her. Meanwhile, Blitzo confronts an animatronic foe and former coworker, Robo Fizz. In a funhouse, Stolas and Octavia discuss their strained family dynamic. Octavia fears abandonment by Stolas, who reassures her of his commitment and apologizes for neglecting her. They depart from the park with the rest of I.M.P, as the park burns to the ground as a result of Blitzo's fight with Robo Fizz. Musical numbers: "You Will Be Okay" and "Loo Loo Land"
3	3	"Spring Broken"	Vivienne Medrano	Vivienne Medrano & Brandon Rogers	January 31, 2021
I.M.P's company parking space is stolen by Blitzo's ex, Verosika Mayday, and several of her succubi friends. He challenges her for ownership of the parking space, and the two groups go to a beach on Earth to compete. Verosika almost wins, but her discarded drink inadvertently mutates a fish into a giant monster, which attacks the humans before getting killed by Millie. Verosika reluctantly agrees to give I.M.P their parking spot back in exchange for them not reporting the incident. Musical numbers: "Vacay to Bonetown" and "Mustang Dong" (end credits)
4	4	"C.H.E.R.U.B."	Vivienne Medrano	Vivienne Medrano & Brandon Rogers	March 14, 2021
A former inventor who has just entered Hell hires I.M.P to kill his business partner, Lyle Lipton. Before they can, three cherubs from Heaven arrive and try to prove to Lipton that his life is worth living. I.M.P and the cherubs battle over Lipton's life before the cherubs accidentally kill him, completing I.M.P's job for them. I.M.P returns to Hell, while the cherubs are banned from reentering Heaven. Musical numbers: "C.H.E.R.U.B Jingle"
5	5	"The Harvest Moon Festival"	Vivienne Medrano	Vivienne Medrano & Brandon Rogers	April 30, 2021
I.M.P visits Millie's parents in the Wrath ring during the Harvest Moon Festival. Their farmhand, Striker, constantly upstages Moxxie and bonds with Blitzo, until he is revealed to be an assassin plotting to kill Stolas. I.M.P stops him, and Striker escapes, reporting his failure to his client – Stolas' wife, Stella – while promising to succeed the next time. Musical numbers: "Striker's Song"
6	6	"Truth Seekers"	Vivienne Medrano	Vivienne Medrano & Brandon Rogers	August 21, 2021
During a mission to Earth, Blitzo and Moxxie are captured by a secret agency called D.H.O.R.K.S. They are interrogated in a facility, where they confess their emotional issues with one another under the influence of a truth serum. Millie and Loona rescue them, and the four battle the agents before being rescued by Stolas. I.M.P and Stolas return to Hell, unaware that the facility has recorded everything, providing the agents with proof of demons' existence. Musical numbers: "Moxxie's Bad Trip"
7	7	"Ozzie's"	Vivienne Medrano	Vivienne Medrano	October 31, 2021
Moxxie and Millie go to a couples-only restaurant in the Lust ring for their anniversary. Blitzo follows them, reluctantly asking Stolas on a date to get into the restaurant. Stolas is spotted with Blitzo, and the two are humiliated by the restaurant's eponymous owner and the Sin of Lust, Asmodeus, along with the head entertainer and Blitzo's childhood friend, Fizzarolli. Musical numbers: "House of Asmodeus"
8	8	"Queen Bee"	Vivienne Medrano	Vivienne Medrano & Brandon Rogers	June 24, 2023
Loona is invited to a hellhound party in the Gluttony ring by Vortex, Verosika's hellhound bodyguard, and meets his girlfriend: Beelzebub, the Sin of Gluttony. Meanwhile, Blitzo processes his feelings after being humiliated at Ozzie’s. Musical numbers: "Cotton Candy" and "Monster's Ball" (end credits)

=== Season 2 (2022–2024) ===
No. overall	No. in season	Title	Directed by	Written by	Original release date
9	1	"The Circus"	Vivienne Medrano	Vivienne Medrano	July 30, 2022
On his birthday, a young Stolas receives a grimoire from his father, Paimon, and he tells him of his arranged marriage to Stella. To cheer up his distraught son, Paimon takes him to an imp-run circus, where Stolas takes interest in a young Blitzo. Paimon arranges a playdate for them both, but Blitzo's father and the circus owner, Cash Buckzo, secretly instructs him to use this as an opportunity to rob the palace. Despite Blitzo's attempts, he and Stolas become friends. Twenty-five years later, Stolas is unhappily married to Stella. After Blitzo is caught trying to break into the palace to steal his grimoire, Stolas incorrectly assumes Blitzo is seeking a sexual encounter, leading to them having sex. As Blitzo leaves with the grimoire the next day, he is spotted by Stella, and Stolas demands a divorce. In the present, following his disastrous date with Blitzo in "Ozzie's", Stolas reflects on their relationship. Stella interrupts Stolas and accuses him of betraying her, but Stolas contends that their marriage was never based on love and demands a divorce again. Stella agrees, but vows that he will pay. Musical numbers: "Stolas Sings"
10	2	"Seeing Stars"	Vivienne Medrano	Adam Neylan	October 19, 2022
Distracted by his ongoing divorce proceedings, Stolas forgets about a meteor shower that he had promised to take Octavia to see when she was a child. Upset, Octavia steals his grimoire and attempts to use it to see the meteor shower herself, but accidentally teleports to Los Angeles. I.M.P and Stolas search for Octavia, with Loona ultimately finding her at the Griffith Observatory. The two have a heart-to-heart talk about their fathers, and Loona reassures Octavia that Stolas truly loves her despite his shortcomings. As they reunite, Stolas apologizes to Octavia for forgetting about the meteor shower, and she forgives him. Musical numbers: "I Like It" and "Til the Day We Die" (end credits)
11	3	"Exes and Oohs"	Vivienne Medrano	Adam Neylan	March 11, 2023
I.M.P visits Moxxie's father Crimson, a high-profile Mafia boss, in the Greed ring. Crimson forces Moxxie to marry Chaz, a self-absorbed shark demon who both Moxxie and Millie previously dated, in order to acquire his supposedly inherited fortune. I.M.P escapes from Crimson and his henchmen, revealing Chaz's plan to marry into the family so he could steal their fortune. After seemingly killing Chaz, Crimson vows revenge against I.M.P. Musical numbers: "Chaz Time", "Crashin' a Wedding"
12	4	"Western Energy"	Vivienne Medrano	Vivienne Medrano	May 20, 2023
Striker abducts Stolas in an attempt to fulfill his assassination contract from Stella, but is pursued by I.M.P. Meanwhile, after being informed by her brother Andrealphus that Stolas' death would cause his power to be inherited by Octavia, leaving her with nothing, Stella reluctantly calls Striker to cancel the hit. Striker escapes, leaving Stolas alive but severely injured, much to Blitzo's shock, believing that Stolas to be unharmable. Musical numbers: "The Ballad of Striker", "Whatcha Thinkin' About"
13	5	"Unhappy Campers"	Vivienne Medrano	Adam Neylan	July 8, 2023
Due to Blitzø focusing on finding his sister Barbie since she has recently left rehab, Moxxie leads a hit mission for I.M.P at a human summer camp, where their human disguises are met with a mixed reception, with Millie’s "Millard" disguise endearing her to the campers while Moxxie's "Moxxine" disguise makes the campers see her as awkward and annoying. After a week, a concert happens and Millie joins and Moxxie reunites with Blitzø, who has tracked Barbie to the camp as she has become a drug dealer for a counselor, Jimmy, who killed IMP's latest client and it soon results in Millie accidentally killing Jimmy, to Barbie’s anger as she leaves and rebuffs Blitzø's olive branch, blaming him for ruining their family. Musical numbers: "Regular Joe", "Everybody Look at Me" and "You Got the Power"
14	6	"Oops"	Vivienne Medrano	Vivienne Medrano	September 9, 2023
Blitzo and Fizzarolli are abducted by Striker, with Crimson demanding a large ransom from Asmodeus in exchange for Fizzarolli's release. With no one else coming to their rescue, Blitzo and Fizzarolli are forced to work together to do so themselves, reconciling their past friendship in the process. Meanwhile, Stolas visits Asmodeus to request a crystal that would allow Blitzo to freely traverse between Hell and Earth. Musical number: "Look at This"
15	7	"Mammon's Magnificent Musical Mid-Season Special (ft Fizzarolli)"	Vivienne Medrano	Vivienne Medrano	October 29, 2023
Fizzarolli competes in a clown pageant held by his boss Mammon, the sin of Greed, much to Asmodeus’ dismay. Blitzo, brought in to serve as Fizzarolli's bodyguard, also tries to convince his friend to cut ties with Mammon. Ultimately, Fizzarolli is convinced to quit working for Mammon after one last performance, and Asmodeus reveals their secret romance to the audience, with Mammon promising that he will regret it. Musical numbers: "Juggling Iz Cool", "Klown Bitch", "Crooked", and "2 Minutes Notice"
16	8	"The Full Moon"	Vivienne Medrano	Vivienne Medrano and Adam Neylan	May 31, 2024
Blitzo prepares for his monthly meeting with Stolas. Meanwhile, C.H.E.R.U.B and D.H.O.R.K.S team up to hunt him down and kill him, but are thwarted by Moxxie, Millie, and Loona. Blitzo meets with Stolas, only to be given the crystal he requested from Asmodeus, telling him that they can now see each other willingly and not because of obligation. Blitzo erupts at Stolas in anger before the latter tearfully teleports him out of the palace. Musical number: "When I See Him"
17	9	"Apology Tour"	Vivienne Medrano	Vivienne Medrano	June 22, 2024
After another argument with Stolas, Blitzo embarks on an "apology tour", giving half-hearted apology hampere to those that he had wronged in the past. The tour culminates on Earth, where Verosika is hosting a Halloween party dedicated to slamming Blitzo for his past actions. Stolas is invited to the party and sings a musical number about still loving Blitzo despite how he had treated him, which a disguised Blitzo witnesses. Blitzo begins to realize his actions and extends genuine apologies to both Stolas and Verosika before leaving the party in shame. Musical numbers: "All 2 U (Motherfucker)", "Handle Me", and "Over You" (end credits)
18	10	"Ghostf**kers"	Vivienne Medrano	Brandon Rogers	October 31, 2024
After his breakup with Stolas, Blitzo spends the company's entire budget as he copes. I.M.P is hired to kill a target at a haunted hotel, where Blitzo attempts to reenact a television show about a ghost hunter who sleeps with ghosts. Millie eventually tires of Blitzo's antics and they separate, leading to Blitzo being haunted by the demon who killed their client. Blitzo is tormented with thoughts of those he hurt in the past, and Millie finds him in an emotional wreck. Millie has a heart-to-heart with Blitzo over their first meeting, reassuring him that he helped make her life better. The two then discover that the hotel's host, Rolando, is a demon from the Envy ring and the culprit for killing their client. Rolando possesses Blitzo and continues to torment him, until Millie attacks Blitzo and forces Rolando out of his body. Blitz electrocutes Rolando, killing him and he and Millie return home. Musical numbers: "A Spooky Kind of Love" and "I Wanna Fuck a Ghost" (end credits)
19	11	"Mastermind"	Vivienne Medrano	Vivienne Medrano	November 29, 2024
Stella informs Andrealphus of Stolas and Blitzo's prior deal and I.M.P is subsequently arrested and tried in a court presided by Satan, the sin of Wrath. The rest of the Seven Deadly Sins (excluding Lucifer) and the Ars Goetia, including Andrealphus and Vassago are also present. Despite Asmodeus, Beelzebub, and Vassago being in support of I.M.P and Stolas, Andrealphus depicts Blitzo as the aggressor in his deal with Stolas, accusing him of hiring Striker to assassinate him. After being sentenced to death, Blitzo persuades Satan to spare the rest of I.M.P. Satan prepares to televise Blitzo's execution, attracting the attention of Stolas, who intervenes to save Blitzo by taking full responsibility for their deal. Satan releases Blitzo and punishes Stolas by stripping him of his powers and status for a hundred years; Andrealphus slyly persuades Satan to let him own Stolas' place. With the entire trial being broadcast, Blitzo and I.M.P become celebrities among their fellow imps after surviving and standing for all imps, while Stolas is ostracized. Blitzo and Loona welcome Stolas in their home for the time being. Musical number: "Mastermind"
20	12	"Sinsmas"	Vivienne Medrano	Vivienne Medrano	December 21, 2024
On Sinsmas, Hell's version of Christmas, Blitzo, in an attempt to cheer up Stolas, recruits him as I.M.P's new receptionist. Stolas tries to reinstate contact with Octavia, but cannot reach her due to Stella taking her phone away. I.M.P is hired to kill a client's ex-husband, who began a new life with his male lover and their daughters, but Blitzo feels uncomfortable upon seeing the family celebrate Christmas together and cancels the hit. Meanwhile, Octavia discovers Stolas' secret stash of antidepressants, leading her to assume that her father was unhappy around her. When Stolas tries to visit her, Andrealphus intervenes, and the two get into a fight. I.M.P comes to Stolas' aid, but Andrealphus overpowers them. Octavia intervenes, not wishing to see Stolas be hurt, but renounces her father for choosing Blitzo over his family. As I.M.P celebrates Sinsmas later that night, Millie discovers she is pregnant but decides to conceal this revelation from Moxxie. Meanwhile, Blitzo and Stolas bond, having both their families rejected them. Musical numbers: "Day By Day", "I Will Be Okay", "A Sinsmas Party (I'll Murder You)", and "Merry Sinsmas" (end credits)

=== Pilot remake (2025) ===
No. overall	Title	Directed by	Written by	Original release date
21	"Mission: Zero"	Vivienne Medrano	Adam Neylan	September 10, 2025 (Note: The episode was later released on YouTube on October 25, 2025.)
Blitzo expands his assassination business to target living humans for sinners in Hell. During a business meeting for their first Earth-based job, Blitzo argues with Moxxie and Millie over the ideal killing method; the two are further concerned when Blitzo reveals he has seduced a member of demon royalty, Stolas, to steal his grimoire used for traveling between Hell and Earth. The meeting is interrupted by Stolas, who assumes Blitzo had taken the grimoire as an excuse to continue their affair. After begrudgingly having sex with him in his office, Blitzo convinces Stolas to loan him the grimoire under the false pretense of further romantic encounters. Blitzo hastily leads the group to Earth following Loona's suggestion that they improvise their missions, proceeding to wreak havoc. Musical number: "I.M.P. Jingle (Rock Version)" Note: The special is a reimagining of the pilot episode.

=== Season 3 (2026) ===
No. overall	No. in season	Title	Directed by	Written by	Original release date
Part 1
22	1	"Turtle Emoji"	Vivienne Medrano	Vivienne Medrano, Brandon Rogers, and Adam Neylan	October 14, 2026 (Note: The episode initially premiered at New York Comic Con on October 8, 2026.) (Note: The episode will later release on YouTube on November 28, 2026.)
Blitzo receives his next assignment: to kill an influencer named Jordan. He brings Moxxie and Loona along with him, but when he and Moxxie get distracted worrying about their significant others' texts, Loona decides to do the job herself. Meanwhile, Stolas and Millie bond, with him realising that she's pregnant. Loona manages to kill Jordan, but begins to feel like Blitzo is ignoring her. Back at the office after the mission, Millie tells Moxxie that she needs space. Back at home, Blitzo reaches out to Stolas and proposes a relationship between them, but Stolas turns him down, saying that it doesn't feel right and confessing his troubled emotional state. Musical number: "I'm Sorry! (Court-Ordered Apology)"
23	2	"Bad Reputation"	Vivienne Medrano	Vivienne Medrano	October 14, 2026 (Note: The episode will later release on YouTube on December 5, 2026.)
Millie heads to the Wrath ring to participate in the Wackford Hoedown, reuniting with her family. The event is interrupted by Cassity, Millie's former partner before a hit gone wrong caused a massacre. When Millie tries to leave, Cassity throws a dueling glove at her, challenging her to a fight to the death. Preparing for the fight, Millie spills her worries about Moxxie's thoughts about her pregnancy to her sister Sallie May, who reassures her, telling her that Moxxie will support her. Millie defeats Cassity but leaves her alive, much to the ire of the crowd. Returning home, Millie finally tells Moxxie that she's pregnant, to his excitement. Musical numbers: "Wackford Hoedown", "Sad Sad Boy (A Boy Who Is Sad)", and "Hot Goss"
24	3	"Gimpy Gimpy"	Vivienne Medrano	Skye Henwood and Vivienne Medrano	October 14, 2026 (Note: The episode will later release on YouTube on December 12, 2026.)
Seeing that Stolas has been feeling down, Blitzo decides to head to Australia with Moxxie and Millie to get a plant for him as a gift to cheer him up, under the guise of completing a mission for a client. He leaves Loona to watch Stolas, and they both bond. She introduces him to a kink app and he begins to relish in the thrills. Meanwhile, Moxxie realises Blitzo's true intentions and implores him to talk to Stolas. After successfully getting the plant from a rainforest, Blitzo returns home and sees Stolas preparing to go out with someone else, with them gifting him a flower, causing Blitzo to become jealous and smash the plant's container in a rage before breaking down crying. Musical numbers: "Dirty Bird" and "Rope" (end credits)
25	4	"A Trial of Errors"	Vivienne Medrano	Brandon Rogers	October 21, 2026 (Note: The episode will later release on YouTube on December 19, 2026.)
Blitzo discovers that Wally Wackford stole his company's name and decides to sue him, but learns that he technically never filed for the name and that Wally and Verosika are dating. After being confronted by Loona, Blitzo reluctantly allows Stolas to handle the case himself, and I.M.P head to the Envy ring for the lawsuit. However, still resentful of Stolas' actions, Blitzo humiliates him during the trial, leading to an intense argument between them in the lobby during the break, which is overheard by the entire courtroom. Blitzo admits that he didn't know if Stolas wanted a relationship, and the latter breaks down, revealing his guilt for every misfortune in his life and for not prioritising Octavia. Eventually, the two reconcile, as Blitzo promises to be more mature. Afterwards, I.M.P successfully wins the trial after Stolas proves that, even though Wally claimed the I.M.P trademark, Blitzo had been operating under it for longer. Afterwards, Blitzo and his team celebrate their victory, as he offers Wally a job at I.M.P. Musical number: "I.M.P. Jingle (Wally's Version)"
26	5	"The Auction"	Vivienne Medrano	Adam Neylan	October 21, 2026 (Note: The episode will later release on YouTube on January 9, 2027.)
Stella and Andrealphus begin auctioning off Stolas' belongings meant for Octavia before her 18th birthday, and intend to marry her off. After Stolas discovers that a locket belonging to his mother will be sold at the auction, Blitzo plots to steal it back. At the auction, Stolas unexpectedly reunites with Vassago, 20 years after they first met in college, where he was Stolas' first love and had proposed that they run away together. In a bidding war with Stella, Vassago successfully buys the locket, along with Stolas' old journal containing his signature, while defending Blitzo but unintentionally humiliating him when he is caught. Afterwards, Vassago gives Stolas the locket and asks him out to dinner; after uninstalling the kink app, Stolas accepts, to Blitzo's outrage. Musical number: "Crimson Sky"
27	6	"Return to Loo Loo Land"	Vivienne Medrano	Vivienne Medrano	October 28, 2026 (Note: The episode will later release on YouTube on January 16, 2027.)
Advised by Asmodeus to take a break after he quit working for Mammon, Fizzarolli takes Blitzo on a trip with him to Loo Loo Land to destroy it further. However, they are both captured by Robo Fizz, who survived his last encounter with Blitzo and has been killing and skinning imps, intending to use their remains to become a "real" imp and replace Fizzarolli. Robo Fizz pursues Blitzo and taunts him for his unreciprocated feelings for Fizzarolli. Loona comes to the rescue, but Robo Fizz deeply wounds her with a chainsaw. Fizzarolli fights Robo Fizz and decapitates him, but suffers serious injuries in the process and calls Asmodeus for help. Loona and Fizzarolli are subsequently hospitalized in the Sloth ring, while Blitzo tortures Robo Fizz's head as a coping mechanism. Musical number: "Nobody's Bay Bay", "Ringleader"
28	7	"Yes/No"	Vivienne Medrano	Skye Henwood	October 28, 2026 (Note: The episode will later release on YouTube on January 23, 2027.)
With Stolas still distraught over being unable to see Octavia, who has just turned 18 and had witnessed him and Blitzo arguing on television, Vassago decides to become Octavia's mentor and use their lessons together as an opportunity for her and Stolas to reconnect. During a trip to the Museum of Spells, Stolas and Octavia eventually reconcile, and he gifts her his mother's locket. Meanwhile, Barbie Wire, homeless and low on money after her girlfriend dumped her, reluctantly asks Blitzo for a job, and the siblings take on a hit in a swamp but are unknowingly followed by Striker. Barbie rescues Blitzo from Striker's attempt to drown him, but then partners with the latter, telling Blitzo that their relationship is unrepairable and blaming him once again for their family's tragedy before leaving with Striker to the Wrath ring, leaving Blitzo devastated. Later that evening, Blitzo and Stolas return home and talk about their days with each other, with Blitzo lying about his day and Stolas commending Vassago. After Stolas falls asleep, Blitzo walks away and quietly wishes him happiness. Musical number: "What Went Wrong"

== Other media ==
=== Music videos ===
Title	Directed by	Songwriter	Storyboarded by	Original release date
"Oh Millie"	Vivienne Medrano	Parry Gripp	Amanda Heard	February 14, 2020
Moxxie sings a love song for Millie. The song was previously featured in the pilot for the series.
"Just Look My Way"	Vivienne Medrano	PARANOiD DJ	Samantha Ames	December 3, 2023
Set between "Oops" and "The Full Moon", Stolas considers the choice to give Blitzo the Asmodean Crystal and reflects on their relationship up to this point.
"Shark Boy Summer"	Vivienne Medrano	Eric Schwartz	Samantha Ambriz	May 16, 2026
Chaz parties and sings about looking for a sex partner.

=== Helluva Shorts ===
No.	Title	Directed by	Written by	Original release date
1	"Hell's Belles"	Vivienne Medrano	Morgana Ignis	April 26, 2024
Millie spends the day in Imp City with her sister, Sallie May, and both sisters reflect on how their individual jobs have affected them both. Guest stars: Morgana Ignis as Sallie May
2	"Mission: Antarctica"	Vivienne Medrano	Adam Neylan	July 31, 2024
A simple assassination trip to Antarctica turns into a narrow escape when Blitzo, Moxxie, and Millie flee for their lives from an army of flesh-eating penguins.
3	"Mission: Weeaboo-Boo"	Vivienne Medrano	Adam Neylan	August 31, 2024
Blitzo travels to the human world to assassinate a young woman, only to discover the woman is attracted to demons. He successfully kills her, but she then enters Hell as a demon and finds him, vowing to be by his side forever, much to Blitzo's dismay. Guest stars: Monica Franco as Emberlynn Pinkle & her mother
4	"Mission: Chupacabras"	Vivienne Medrano	Vivienne Medrano	September 29, 2024
Blitzo is captured on a mission gone wrong by a Mexican goat farmer, who passes him off as the mythical monster, the Chupacabra. Blitzo has to improvise a way to escape and retrieve his gear when D.H.O.R.K.S. agents arrive in the hopes of capturing him as well. Guest stars: Jorge R. Gutierrez as Gerado Velazquez, Monica Franco as Gerado's wife & The Goat, Michael Romeo Ruocco as D.H.O.R.K.S. Agent One, Erica Luttrell as D.H.O.R.K.S. Agent Two
5	"Mission: Orphan Time"	Vivienne Medrano	Lyle Rath	June 28, 2025
Blitzo and Loona are assigned to kill a children's entertainer, but allow him to say goodbye to his children first. The man gives some encouraging words to Loona as well, only to become terrified when she reveals her true appearance, prompting Blitzo to kill him in a brutal fashion. Guest stars: Jack Plotnick as Mr. Wrigglers
6	"Mission: Bad Drivezo"	Vivienne Medrano	Lyle Rath	August 2, 2025
Following a successful assassination job with Moxxie, Blitzo becomes enraged by a reckless driver and decides to chase him. In the end, Moxxie kills him and drives off with Blitzo. Guest stars: Lyle Rath as Drivezo
7	"Mission: Whacked Off"	Vivienne Medrano	Lyle Rath	September 6, 2025
While Blitzo and Millie are out fishing for leeches, the former assigns Moxxie to kill the son of an Italian crime boss. Moxxie subsequently finds himself indirectly helping the mobster target escape the clutches of his twisted father when Moxxie realizes that he can relate to him. Guest stars: Lyle Rath as Paulie & Luigi Paesano
8	"Mission: Big Boss"	Vivienne Medrano	Adam Neylan	February 7, 2026
Tired of Moxxie and Millie not agreeing with his plans, Blitzo carries out the assassination of a corporate CEO and subsequently assumes his identity, enjoying the positive feedback he receives from his secretary, who agrees with all of his ideas. Guest stars: Grey DeLisle as Secretary & TV Reporter
9	"Mission: Bigfoot"	Vivienne Medrano	Lyle Rath	March 7, 2026
Blitzo, Moxxie, and Millie are hired to assassinate Bigfoot, not realizing that they're being helped by him. Guest stars: Tom Kenny as Mr. Mayor/Bigfoot & Adrian, Ben Diskin as Waiter & Gorilla Suit Guy
10	"Mission: It's Chaz Funeral"	Vivienne Medrano	Skye Henwood	April 1, 2026
Blitzo, Moxxie, and Millie are invited to Chaz's "funeral", only to discover that everyone else Chaz has slept with is also in attendance and that Chaz faked his death and is posing as his alleged twin brother. Guest stars: Eric Schwartz as Zahc Zahcwick/Chaz Chadwick Thurman, Lyle Rath as Preacher
11	"Barbie's Bad Day"	Vivienne Medrano	Skye Henwood	April 25, 2026 (Note: The short initially premiered at the LVL UP EXPO the previous day.)
Due to the events of "Unhappy Campers", Barbie Wire loses her job and painfully struggles returning to her apartment and her girlfriend, Kendra. Guest stars: Jinhee Joung as Barbie Wire, Erica Luttrell as Kendra, Jayden Libran as Gerald & Baphomet Elevator Passenger, Lyle Rath as Rick & Shark-Like Demon Elevator Passenger, Monica Franco as Train PA & Imp Druggie Addict
12	"IMP Training Video"	Vivienne Medrano	Adam Neylan	June 13, 2026
Blitzo tries to make an employee training video for I.M.P, but constantly gets irritated when the others don't follow his terribly written script. He also abuses and insults the intern actors (the ones seen in "Mastermind") in the video, much to their annoyance.
13	"Mission: Book Report"	Vivienne Medrano	Adam Neylan	July 11, 2026
When he notices that Stolas is having trouble trying to write a report from Blitzo's awful drawings of a recent mission, Moxxie helps him come up with a story to fit the report.
14	"The Princess & the Pupper"	Amanda Heard & Melanie Mrozek	Adam Neylan	October 3, 2026
Loona attempts to help Octavia sneak back home after the latter snuck out to see her favorite band, "Fuck You, Dad". Guest stars: Barrett Wilbert Weed as Octavia, Monica Franco & Lyle Rath as additional voices
