= Helluva Boss =

American adult animated series

- Genre: Adult animation; Black comedy; Comedy drama; Fantasy; Musical
- Created by: Vivienne Medrano
- Written by: Vivienne Medrano; Brandon Rogers; Adam Neylan
- Story by: Vivienne Medrano; Brandon Rogers; Adam Neylan; Skye Henwood
- Directed by: Vivienne Medrano
- Voices of: Brandon Rogers; Bryce Pinkham; Richard Horvitz; Vivian Nixon; Erica Lindbeck
- Composers: Jefferson Friedman; Matt Novack; Christopher French; Brian Sadler; Sam Haft; Alexander Arntzen; Gooseworx
- Country of origin: United States
- Original language: English
- No. of seasons: 3
- No. of episodes: 28 (plus a pilot) (list of episodes)

Production
- Executive producers: Vivienne Medrano; Tom Murray; Adam Neylan
- Producer: Vivienne Medrano
- Editors: Vivienne Medrano; Nico Colaleo (pilot)
- Running time: 11–30 minutes
- Production companies: SpindleHorse; Amazon MGM Studios (2025–present)

Original release
- Network: YouTube
- Release: November 25, 2019 – present
- Network: Amazon Prime Video
- Release: September 10, 2025 – present

Related
- Hazbin Hotel

Helluva Boss is an American adult animated musical black comedy web and television series created by Vivienne "VivziePop" Medrano. It revolves around the misadventures of the employees of I.M.P., a company in Hell that offers hitman services in the realm of the living. The pilot was released on YouTube on November 25, 2019, before the series premiered on October 31, 2020 on YouTube.

Set in the same fictional universe and a spin-off to Hazbin Hotel, the show is produced by SpindleHorse. The first season premiered exclusively on Medrano's YouTube channel. The second season premiered on July 30, 2022. A spin-off short series titled Helluva Shorts was also released in April 2024. In April 2025, it was announced that the third and fourth seasons will be released on Prime Video first, subsequently releasing on YouTube a month after. A reimagining of the pilot, titled "Mission Zero", was released to Prime Video on September 10, 2025, alongside a re-release of the first two seasons, all of which are fully uncensored. "Mission Zero" was released to YouTube on October 25, 45 days after its Prime Video release. The third season is set to be released in two halves; the first premiered on October 14, 2026, and the second half is set for 2027.

== Premise ==
The series follows the employees of I.M.P. (Immediate Murder Professionals), an imp-run assassination company in Hell that offers hitman services in the realm of the living, on their many different jobs. The members of I.M.P. include Blitzo Buckzo (his first name being pronounced as "Blitz"), the boss of the venture, along with weapons specialist Moxxie, powerhouse Millie, and Blitzo's adopted daughter/receptionist hellhound Loona. With the help of an ancient book obtained from Stolas, a Goetic demon of Hell, they access the human world to complete their tasks on order from souls in Hell.

The show features a different cast of characters and a different storyline than Hazbin Hotel, another show created by Medrano, despite taking place within the same universe. As Medrano described it, while both shows share the same setting, Helluva Boss follows "characters and societies that already exist in Hell", with the main focus being on interpersonal relationships between characters, while Hazbin Hotel is about redemption and consequences.

== Voice cast ==
=== Main ===
- Brandon Rogers as Blitzo Buckzo, Loopty Goopty, and additional voices
- Bryce Pinkham as Stolas
- Richard Horvitz as Moxxie, Crimson, and additional voices
- Vivian Nixon as Millie
- Erica Lindbeck as Loona and a performer on the song "A Spooky Kind of Love"

=== Recurring ===
- Alex Brightman as Fizzarolli "Fizz" and "Robo Fizz"
- Barrett Wilbert Weed as Octavia and the performer of "My World Is Burning Down Around Me"
- Georgina Leahy as Stella
- Maxwell Atoms as Ralphie, Jarold, Loo Loo, and additional voices
- James Monroe Iglehart as Vortex "Tex" and Asmodeus "Ozzie"
- Cristina Vee as Verosika Mayday
- Norman Reedus (season 1) and Edward Bosco (seasons 2–present) as Striker
- Michael Romeo Ruocco as Agent One
- Erica Luttrell as Agent Two and Kendra
- Vivienne Medrano as Keenie, Deerie, and additional voices
- Jinkx Monsoon as Martha, Vikki, Rita, additional voices, and a song vocalist (Note: Credited as a performer on the songs "House of Asmodeus", "A Spooky Kind of Love" and "I Wanna Fuck a Ghost".)
- Morgana Ignis as Sallie May and additional voices
- Kesha Sebert (seasons 1–2) and Rochelle Diamante (seasons 3–present) as Beelzebub "Queen Bee" (Note: Diamante had also provided Beelzebub's singing voice in the first two seasons, prior to becoming the character's main voice actor.)
- Eric Schwartz as Chazwick "Chaz" Thurman and Zahcwick "Zachary" Thurman
- Jason LaShea as Andrealphus
- Jinhee Joung as Barbie Wire
- Joel Perez as Sitri, Doc, and a singer (Note: Credited as a performer on the musical number "The Ballad of Striker".)
- Harvey Guillén as Vassago
- Jack Plotnick as Ghostfuckers musical announcer, a song vocalist, (Note: Credited as a performer on the songs "A Spooky Kind of Love" and "I Wanna Fuck a Ghost".) Yogirt, and Mr. Wrigglers
- Sam Haft as Winston Wackford (singing voice) and other song vocals (Note: Credited as a performer on the songs "You Got the Power (Millie's Big Show)" and "I.M.P Jingle (Wally's Version)".)

=== Guest ===
Season 1

- Mara Wilson as Mrs. Mayberry and additional voices

Season 2

- Jonathan Freeman as Paimon and Cash Buckzo
- Julián Rebolledo as a singer and additional voices
- Blake Roman as a singer
- Michael Cusack as Mammon
- Zach Hadel as additional voices
- Faye Mata as Glitz and Glam
- Tom Cardy as the performer of "Juggling Iz Cool"
- John Waters as Rolando
- Erika Henningsen as Bethany Ghostfucker
- Patrick Page as Satan
- Benny Benack III as the performer of "Merry Sinsmas"

Season 3

- Ian Hecox as Homie Joey
- Anthony Padilla as Jordie Jordan
- Tobin Bell as Winston Wackford (speaking voice)
- Caroline Innerbichler as Willow & Wendy Wackford
- Maria Bamford as Cassity
- Paulette Jones as Judge Jiner
- Krystina Alabado as a performer on "Nobody's Bay Bay"

Helluva Shorts

- Jorge R. Gutiérrez as Gerardo Velazquez ("The Farmer")
- Grey DeLisle as Secretary and TV Reporter
- Tom Kenny as Mayor and additional voices
- Ben Diskin as Gorilla Suit Guy and Waiter

Pilot

- Brock Baker as Stolas
- Parry Gripp as the performer of "I.M.P Jingle"

== Episodes ==
| Season | Episodes | | Originally released | | |
| Season | Episodes | | First released | Last released | Network |
|---|---|---|---|---|---|
| Pilot | | | November 25, 2019 | | YouTube |
| 1 | 8 | 7 | October 31, 2020 | October 31, 2021 | YouTube |
| 1 | 8 | 1 | June 24, 2023 (Note: The final episode of the season was delayed and released in 2023, during the airing of the second season.) | | YouTube |
| 2 | 12 | | July 30, 2022 | December 21, 2024 | YouTube |
| Pilot remake | | | September 10, 2025 | | Amazon Prime Video; YouTube |
| 3 | 15 | 7 | October 14, 2026 (Note: The season will begin on YouTube on November 28, 2026.) | October 28, 2026 | Amazon Prime Video; YouTube |
| 3 | 15 | 8 | 2027 | TBA | Amazon Prime Video; YouTube |

== Production and release ==
In June 2019, Medrano stated that she was working with Erica Lindbeck, Brock Baker, and Brandon Rogers on a "new project". The pilot of Helluva Boss was cast by voice actor Kellen Goff and voice directed by Medrano and Rick Zieff. Lucas Bermudez of Screen Rant attributed the success of Hazbin Hotel as the sole reason for Helluva Boss being greenlit. At some point, Rogers asked Jinkx Monsoon to voice a character in Helluva Boss, but Monsoon wanted to voice "stock characters" instead, so she did so, voicing various background and one-off characters in the show's first season.

On November 25, 2019, the pilot was released on Medrano's YouTube channel. Medrano contributed her writing and animation skills to the episode. Writing production for more episodes began in December 2019, with 8 episodes ordered. The company Horseless Cowboy assisted Medrano with voice work during the first season, with Richard Horvitz and Medrano voice directing. In August 2020, the recording for season 1 was completed, and Lucas Bermudez of Screen Rant predicted that more episodes of Helluva Boss would be released to YouTube "as a web series" because of the COVID-19 pandemic.

On October 31, 2020, the first episode of season 1 was released. In the episode, Rogers and Horvitz return as Blitzo and Moxxie, and while Lindbeck returns as Loona, she is replaced by Vivian Nixon as the voice of Millie. Baker was replaced by Bryce Pinkham as Stolas. Guest stars of the episode include Monsoon, Mara Wilson, and Maxwell Atoms.

On January 31, 2021, the third episode of the series was age-restricted by YouTube. In response, the entertainment site Newgrounds offered to host an uncensored version of the episode and promote it with "a front page banner", something which Medrano expressed interest in. (Note: Newgrounds [@Newgrounds] (January 31, 2021). "We'd love to host the uncensored version and promo with a front page banner!" (Tweet). Archived from the original on February 1, 2021 – via Twitter. See her response here.) The episode's age restriction was lifted the next day, and was later removed.

In February 2021, Medrano told Insider that Helluva Boss remains independent of Hazbin Hotel, stating she intends to keep it that way "as long as the audience wants to keep seeing it", adding that she has "a plan for where the story goes and ends".

In September 2021, Medrano spoke on a virtual stage at the Animation Exposé of the Ottawa International Animation Festival about creating Hazbin Hotel and Helluva Boss. She was joined by Bryan Dimas, the associate producer of development at Warner Bros. Animation and co-director of a group called LatinX in Animation.

In February 2022, the official Helluva Boss Twitter account stated that the season one finale would be out "soon" but that it was taking longer than expected, and noted that season two was in production. On June 3, 2022, the Helluva Boss Twitter account released an update after the final episode of season 1 was delayed, and the series would instead be moving forward with season 2. The original season 1 finale was released a year later on June 24, 2023. The second season premiered on July 30, 2022. The series has included celebrities such as Kesha, Norman Reedus, Mara Wilson, Alex Brightman and others as guest stars.

On March 27, 2023, the show was confirmed to be renewed for a third season, in active production. On May 25, 2023, Medrano stated that the series was planned to be "a very set 4 season story". On July 31, 2023, VivziePop posted titles for the upcoming episodes for season 2 on Twitter.

On April 26, 2024, a spin-off short series of Helluva Boss titled Helluva Shorts was announced at LVLUP Expo, with the first short being released on the same day.

On April 25, 2025, at Level Up EXPO 2025, it was announced that uncensored Helluva Boss episodes of seasons 1 and 2 would be available on Amazon Prime Video from September 10. Additionally, Prime Video will host seasons 3 and 4 of the show, with future episodes coming to YouTube 45 days after airing on Prime Video. Amazon MGM Studios was also announced to be joining SpindleHorse to produce the series. Medrano expressed that she was grateful to Amazon for the opportunity and what it "means for the continued rise of indie animation". The A.V. Club also reported that Medrano and SpindleHorse would retain "full creative control and final cut on the series". ComicBook.com later reported that Rochelle Diamante would be taking over the voice role of Beezlebub from Kesha.

The third season is set to be released in two halves; the first premiered on October 14, 2026, and the second half is set for 2027.

== Soundtrack ==
On July 24, 2025, it was announced that Atlantic Records would distribute the soundtracks of Helluva Boss and Hazbin Hotel to streaming and vinyl, releasing on September 10.

=== Albums ===
List of soundtrack albums, with selected chart positions
| Title | Album details | Peak chart positions | | | |
| Title | Album details | US Comedy | UK Comp. | UK Down. | UK OST |
|---|---|---|---|---|---|
| Helluva Boss: Season One (Original Soundtrack) | Released: September 10, 2025; Label: Atlantic; Formats: Digital download, streaming, CD, vinyl, cassette | 3 | 45 | 56 | 4 |
| Helluva Boss: Season Two (Original Soundtrack) | Released: September 9, 2025; Label: Atlantic; Formats: Digital download, streaming, CD, vinyl | 1 | — | — | 9 |
| Helluva Boss: Season Three, Part 1 (Original Soundtrack) | Released: October 28, 2026; Label: Atlantic; Formats: Digital download, streaming | 3 | — | 37 | — |

=== EPs ===
List of soundtrack EPs, with selected chart positions
| Title | Album details | Peak chart positions |
| Title | Album details | US Comedy |
|---|---|---|
| Helluva Boss: Season Three, Part 1 (Episodes 1-3) | Released: October 14, 2026; Label: Atlantic; Format: Streaming | 5 |
| Helluva Boss: Season Three, Part 1 (Episodes 4-5) | Released: October 21, 2026; Label: Atlantic; Format: Streaming | — |

=== Singles ===
List of singles, showing year released and album name
| Title | Year | Album |
|---|---|---|
| "A Sinsmas Party (I'll Murder You)" | December 24, 2024 | Helluva Boss: Season Two (Original Soundtrack) |
| "Merry Sinsmas" | December 24, 2024 | Helluva Boss: Season Two (Original Soundtrack) |
| "You Will Be Okay" | July 24, 2025 | Helluva Boss: Season One (Original Soundtrack) |
| "Klown Bitch" | September 3, 2025 | Helluva Boss: Season Two (Original Soundtrack) |
| "Shark Boy Summer" | June 26, 2026 | Non-album single |
| "Nobody's Bay Bay" | September 16, 2026 | Helluva Boss: Season Three, Part 1 (Original Soundtrack) |
| "Rope" | October 8, 2026 | Helluva Boss: Season Three, Part 1 (Original Soundtrack) |

=== Charted songs ===
List of charted songs, showing year released and album name
| Title | Year | Peak chart positions | Album |
| Title | Year | NZ Hot | Album |
|---|---|---|---|
| "Dirty Bird" | 2026 | 26 | Helluva Boss: Season Three, Part 1 (Original Soundtrack) |
| "Ringleader" | 2026 | 38 | Helluva Boss: Season Three, Part 1 (Original Soundtrack) |
| "What Went Wrong" | 2026 | 33 | Helluva Boss: Season Three, Part 1 (Original Soundtrack) |

== LGBTQ+ representation ==
Helluva Boss has various LGBTQ+ characters, specifically Moxxie, who is bisexual, and Blitzo, who is pansexual. Another character, Stolas, is gay. The episode "The Harvest Moon Festival" introduced the character Sallie May, Millie's sister, who was confirmed on the show's official Twitter account to be transgender, and by her voice actor to be lesbian.

In June 2024, the official Twitter account for the series shared an image for Pride Month which featured—among others—Asmodeus, Verosika, Blitzo, and Beelzebub wearing or holding the colors of the pansexual pride flag; Loona and Moxxie wearing clothes with bisexual pride flag colors; Stolas, Fizzarolli, and Andrealphus wearing the colors of the gay men's flag and gay pride flag; Octavia and Mammon wearing clothes with asexual pride flag colors; and Sallie May wearing clothes with lesbian pride flag colors while sitting on a trans pride flag.

== Reception ==
In December 2019, in an article about the current state of adult animation, CBR animation critic Reuben Baron stated that, while the pilot episode of Helluva Boss has garnered "warranted criticism" because of its "edgy" humor, it is still a "clear labor of love from an animation standpoint". Another reviewer, also for CBR, Morgan Shaunette, described the series as "underrated", said that it is a "twisted take on the workplace comedy", and called it a "helluva strange ride". Tito W. James of Comicon.com stated that demons having access to a portal that connects to the human realm "adds a new dynamic and is ripe for narrative potential". James also said that he was impressed with the quality of the series and stated that "other animated adult comedies should take notes".

Zoe Dumas of MovieWeb argued that the series has "emotionally complex" characters, a talented and musical voice cast, and "outstanding" animation. Dumas also described it as "more episodic and character-driven" than Hazbin Hotel, while complimenting the latter. Joshua S. Mackey for Into praised the series for having "three different queer main characters".

=== Fandom ===
Animation Magazine reported that the pilots of Hazbin Hotel and Helluva Boss had been, collectively, viewed over 65 million times by October 7, 2020. It referred to Helluva Boss as "wildly popular" and an "overnight sensation".

In February 2021, Insider stated that Medrano had "carved out a niche for adult animation on the platform".

In 2023, scholar Ben Mitchell described the series as "sensationally popular" and an effective use of Patreon to subsidize the show's art "through monthly tiered payments".

=== Awards and nominations ===
| Year | Award | Category | Nominee | Result | Ref. |
|---|---|---|---|---|---|
| 2020 | Ursa Major Awards | Best Dramatic Series | Helluva Boss for "Murder Family" and "Loo Loo Land" | Nominated | |
| 2021 | Ursa Major Awards | Best Dramatic Series | Helluva Boss | Won | |
| 2022 | Ursa Major Awards | Best Dramatic Series | Helluva Boss for "The Circus" and "Seeing Stars" | Nominated | |
| 2023 | Streamy Awards | Subject Award – Animated | Helluva Boss by VivziePop | Won | |
| 2024 | Queerty Awards | Best Web Series | Helluva Boss | Won | |

== Tabletop games ==
In September 2025, Immediate Murder Professionals, a board and party card game designed by Creatist Games, was funded through a Kickstarter campaign, with a projected release date of April 2026.

In October 2026, it was announced that Helluva Boss: The Seven Sigils, a cooperative strategy and puzzle board game, would be coming from Warren James Games and SpindleHorse.

== See also ==
- Modern animation in the United States
- Adult animation by country
- List of adult animated television series
  - List of adult animated television series of the 2020s
- LGBTQ themes in Western animation
- List of animated series with LGBTQ characters: 2020–2024
