= Apology Tour =

Apology Tour may refer to:

- "Apology Tour" (Helluva Boss), a 2024 television episode
- "Apology Tour" (Shrinking), a 2023 television episode
