= Pilot (Helluva Boss) =

American adult animated pilot episode

- Helluva Boss episode
- Directed by: Vivienne Medrano; Rick Zieff
- Written by: Vivienne Medrano; Brandon Rogers
- Editing by: Nico Colaleo
- Original air date: November 25, 2019
- Running time: 11 minutes

Episode chronology
← Previous —	Next → "Murder Family" Remake: "Mission: Zero"

The pilot episode of the American animated musical web series Helluva Boss was written by series creators Vivienne "VivziePop" Medrano and Brandon Rogers, and directed by Medrano and Rick Zieff. It premiered to YouTube on November 25, 2019. It was mostly positively received, and has been viewed over 62 million times, which led Medrano to expand Helluva Boss into a full show. In November 2023, Medrano stated the pilot was "not functionally canon" to the full series. Consequently, a remake of the pilot fitting to the rest of the series, titled "Mission: Zero", was released to Amazon Prime Video on September 10, 2025, alongside a re-release of the first two seasons of Helluva Boss, all uncensored. "Mission Zero" was released to YouTube on October 25, 45 days after its Prime Video release.

Set in the same fictional universe as Medrano's show Hazbin Hotel, the pilot introduces protagonists, the employees of the imp-run assassination company I.M.P (Immediate Murder Professionals): Blitzo, the titular boss; his daughter, hellhound receptionist Loona; weapons experts Moxxie; and his wife, Millie, the company's bruiser, and follows them as they attempt to drum up business for their company.

== Plot ==
Blitzo (pronounced "Blitz") (voiced by Rogers) the imp runs an assassination company with three other demons: his adopted daughter Loona (voiced by Erica Lindbeck), and married couple Moxxie (voiced by Richard Steven Horvitz) and Millie (voiced by Lindbeck). Their company takes clients from Hell who want to have people killed on Earth. They are shown discussing various ways to get more clients for their business, and reminiscing on past missions. One mission is shown to have gone wrong, with Moxxie accidentally shooting the wrong target, a young boy, before taking the critically injured boy back to Hell. The four demons argue over various issues taking place in the company, including Loona's apathy to her fellow coworkers, and Blitzo's tendency to stalk Moxxie and Millie outside of work. It is additionally established that the method the imps use to reach Earth is a portal created by a grimoire owned by Stolas (voiced by Brock Baker), a Goetial demon of Hell, whom Blitzo stole the book from after the two had a one-night stand. The episode ends with Loona receiving a text from a client, confirming that the young boy was the right target all along. The four demons kill the boy, and reconcile their issues with one another while dismembering and disposing of his body.

== Production and release ==
The popularity and success of the pilot for Hazbin Hotel allowed Medrano to develop another pilot for a separate series set in the same universe to premiere that same year, ultimately entitled Helluva Boss. The pilot was cast by voice actor Kellen Goff, and voice directed by Medrano and Rick Zieff. It was storyboarded by Samantha Ames, Amanda Heard, Amy Heard, and Lidia Liu. It was edited by Nico Colaleo. The pilot was released on Medrano's YouTube channel on November 25, 2019. An extended music video of the song "Oh Millie", featured in the pilot, was released on February 14, 2020. Additionally, an official French dub of the pilot was released on September 16, 2020.

== Reception ==
=== Critical reception ===
Mercedes Milligan of Animation Magazine lauded the episode's "devilishly twisted comic tone", calling it "wildly popular" and "an overnight sensation". Reuben Baron of Comic Book Resources noted the episode's "warranted criticism" from its "edgy" humor, while also praising it as a "clear labor of love from an animation standpoint". Hope Mullinax of The Geeky Waffle similarly complimented the episode's "rewatchable" nature as "a solid introduction" to its characters, concluding by describing it as "a great time and a fantastic start to this well-built world" and "an excellent introduction to how each [character] functions within the narrative". Mark Radulich of W2Mnet and Katya Stec of All Ages of Geek independently praised the pilot as "worth watching".

Fiction Talk described the pilot of Helluva Boss as having created the expectation of "a Phineas and Ferb-esque show [with] a very mild plot [and] held together by good comedy, and amusing characters [who] didn’t need motivation that could be taken seriously because no one else seemed to do that." Similarly, Ephrom Josine of Medium criticized the pilot for not "do[ing] a very good job [with its] characters, describing them as feeling "like one person chopped up a bunch of times in order to make it so the show isn't just some guy talking to himself. Any real differences between each demon is shown way too fast for my brain to have time to get anything out of it," before positively concluding that "if you like slice-of-life style comedies I would recommend giving Helluva Boss a shot". Joker on the Sofa also praised how "[a] lot of the humor [comes] from the fact that [the main characters] are basically a massively dysfunctional family", similarly praising the "likewise over-the-top [and] exaggerated qualities" of the pilot's supporting characters, and both the "ridiculous ultraviolence that regularly ensues and the dark jokes that come from it", concluding by calling it "consistently hilarious".

=== Expansion to web series ===
Following the pilot's positive critical reception, Medrano wrote eight episodes for a first season with Brandon Rogers. The series was released to YouTube as a web series with Lindbeck and Baker replaced in their respective roles as Millie and Stolas by Vivian Nixon and Bryce Pinkham, although Lindbeck would continue to voice Loona. The series was critically acclaimed, and after completing its first season, was renewed for a second season on YouTube, and ultimately a third and fourth season on Amazon Prime Video.

=== Remake ===
In November 2023, Vivienne Medrano stated the pilot was "not functionally canon" to the full series. Consequently, a remake of the pilot fitting to the rest of the series, titled "Mission: Zero", was released to Amazon Prime Video on September 10, 2025, alongside a re-release of the first two seasons of Helluva Boss, all uncensored. "Mission: Zero" was released to YouTube on October 25, 45 days after its Prime Video release.
