= Severus Snape and the Marauders =

- Official Release Poster
- Directed by: Justin Zagri
- Written by: Justin Zagri
- Produced by: Liana Minassian
- Starring: Morgana Ignis; Garrett Schweighauser; Kevin Allen; Paul Stanko; Zachary David; Dani Jae
- Cinematography: John Hafner
- Edited by: Justin Zagri
- Music by: Alexander Arntzen
- Production company: Broad Strokes
- Distributed by: New Line Cinema
- Release date: March 1, 2016
- Running time: 23 minutes
- Country: United States
- Language: English

Severus Snape and the Marauders is a 2016 American short film written by director Justin Zagri, based on Harry Potter characters by J. K. Rowling. It officially premiered on March 1, 2016, at the YouTube channel Broad Strokes Productions. The fan film caught the attention of BuzzFeed, Entertainment Weekly, Time, Elite Daily, Business Insider, The Huffington Post, IGN, Seventeen, Moviepilot, MTV, BBC America, PopSugar, The Independent, and The Mary Sue.

== Plot ==
Severus Snape is enjoying a drink in a Muggle pub when a stranger, whose face is covered, joins him. The stranger asks Snape about his story, which he then tells.

Some time before, the Marauders – James Potter, Remus Lupin, Sirius Black and Peter Pettigrew – were in the same bar celebrating their graduation from Hogwarts. Upon seeing Snape, James challenges him to a duel. Before they all disapparate elsewhere, Lily Evans sees them.

They appear in a forest at night, and James and Snape start dueling. However, Snape eventually becomes victorious, so Remus, Sirius, and (pressured by James) Peter join the fight, and they all produce the Fiendfyre spell, creating a big, four headed fire monster, with each head being their animal form. Snape disapparates to elsewhere in the forest, and Remus, Sirius and James do too, while Peter joins them on foot.

Using Legilimency, Snape predicts their next attack. However, the Marauders attack him at the same time, eventually having him cornered. Snape, remembering their bullying throughout the years, and Lily, rebounds the spells, applies the Cruciatus Curse to Sirius, and Sectumsempra to Remus. Snape attempts to curse Peter, but he takes on his rat form and escapes. Snape approaches James and attempts to kill him, but Lily apparates before him, demanding an explanation. Snape apologizes for calling her a Mudblood (seen in a flashback in Harry Potter and the Order of the Phoenix). Lily tells Snape that she will forgive him if he changes and stops being with Dark wizards, such as Bellatrix Lestrange. Lily disapparates with James, Remus, and Sirius.

Returning to the first scene at the pub, the stranger tells Snape that he knows how it feels to be subjugated and feared for one's talents. He then asks Snape to join his ranks. Snape demands to know who the stranger is. The stranger replies, "You-Know-Who."

== Cast ==
- Morgana Ignis as Severus Snape
- Garrett Schweighauser as James Potter
- Kevin Allen as Sirius Black
- Paul Stanko as Remus Lupin
- Zachary David as Peter Pettigrew
- Dani Jae as Lily Evans
- Clayton Nemrow as Voldemort

== The Great Wizarding War ==
After the success of the fan film, the Broad Strokes team starting working on a follow-up to Severus Snape and the Marauders, a 12-part audio drama called The Great Wizarding War written by Justin Zagri and Garrett Schweighauser. The audio adventure started in late 2019 with the same actors reprised their roles as the Marauders, Lily and Snape. The Great Wizarding War started the adventure just after the events of the fan film, and chronicles early days of the first war between the Order of the Phoenix and the Death Eaters. The final episodes were uploaded to YouTube on March 2, 2022.
