= Eric Schwartz (comedian) =

American comedian and musician

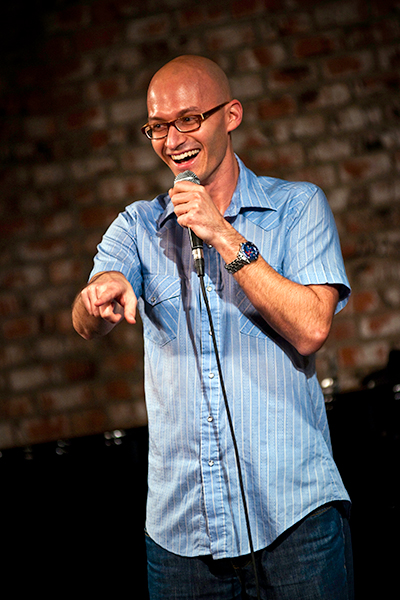
- Schwartz performing in 2010.
- Born: Eric Scott Schwartz; Tarzana, California, U.S.
- Other name: Smooth-E

Comedy career
- Years active: 1996–present
- Medium: Standup comedy, musical comedy, online content
- Website: smoothe.tv

Eric Scott Schwartz, also known as "Smooth-E", is an American comedian, actor, and singer-songwriter from Thousand Oaks, California known for his blend of stand-up comedy, music, and video.

== Stand-up comedy ==
In 2013, Schwartz was billed as "one of the nation’s hottest rising stand up headliners", Eric Schwartz regularly performs as the headliner at The Improv and The Laugh Factory comedy clubs while on tour.

== Discography ==
| Album | Tracks | Release date |
|---|---|---|
| Kosher Kuts | 11 | November 9, 2004 |
| Wimp Pimp | 19 | 2005 |
| Kosher Kuts: Hungry For More | 11 | October 10, 2006 |
| Parodies Nuts | 28 | January 27, 2009 |

== Filmography ==
=== Web series ===
| Title | Role | Year | Notes |
|---|---|---|---|
| Helluva Boss | Chazwick "Chaz" Thurman | 2023 | Episode: "Exes and Oohs" |
| Helluva Boss | Zachwick "Zahc" Thurman | 2026 | Episode: "Mission: It's Chaz Funeral" (short) |
| Helluva Boss | Chazwick "Chaz" Thurman | 2026 | Episode: "Bad Reputation" |
