= The Curious Creations of Christine McConnell =

2018 American cooking show

- Genre: Gothic; Cooking show; Sitcom
- Created by: Christine McConnell
- Developed by: Netflix
- Written by: Kirk R. Thatcher
- Directed by: Kirk R. Thatcher
- Presented by: Christine McConnell
- Starring: Morgana Ignis; Dita Von Teese; Adam Mayfield; Colleen Smith; Steven Porter
- Voices of: Colleen Smith; Michael Oosterom; Drew Massey; Tim Lagasse
- Narrated by: Michael Oosterom
- Composer: Mick Giacchino
- Country of origin: United States
- Original language: English
- No. of seasons: 1
- No. of episodes: 6

Production
- Executive producers: Christine McConnell; Brian Henson; Vincent J. Raisa; Kirk R. Thatcher; Judith Regan
- Producers: Nathan Ament; Andrea Stockert
- Cinematography: Dominique Martinez
- Running time: 24–28 minutes
- Production companies: Henson Alternative; Wilshire Studios

Original release
- Network: Netflix
- Release: October 12, 2018

The Curious Creations of Christine McConnell is an American Gothic cooking show created by and starring Christine McConnell. It premiered on Netflix on October 12, 2018. The series consists of six episodes and was produced by Wilshire Studios and Henson Alternative, an arm of The Jim Henson Company. In April 2019, the series was canceled after one season.

== Premise ==
The show centers around Christine McConnell, an artist and baker who lives in a mansion inhabited by monsters and ghosts. Accompanied by Rose, Rankle, and Edgar, McConnell loves to creates morbid-looking desserts including gingerbread haunted houses, caramel spiders and bones made from pretzel sticks, peanut butter and white chocolate.

The show combines DIY and scripted-reality elements and features storylines involving annoying neighbors, relatives, and what to wear on a first date with someone you just met at the cemetery.

== Characters ==
- Christine McConnell (portrayed by herself) – A baker and artist. She feeds and cares for the creatures that live with her. Christine is a kind and warm person; however, she lets the creatures plot against the neighbors and each other.
- Rose (performed by Colleen Smith) – A raccoon who was crushed to death in the back of a garbage truck but reanimated by Christine.
- Rankle (performed by Michael Oosterom) – The mummy of an ancient Egyptian cat. Christine found him in an antique store and read the spell on his burial plate to bring him back to life.
- Edgar (body-performed by Morgana Ignis, face-performed and voiced by Drew Massey) – A werewolf that was left on Christine's doorstep for her to find and now lives with her.
- Bernard (performed by Tim Lagasse) – A monster that lives in the basement. Rose confides in him for advice and guidance.
- Milly – The creature that lives in the refrigerator. Only its tentacles are seen when assisting Christine by passing her items.
- Vivienne (portrayed by Dita Von Teese) – The ghost of a woman who has been shot by her supposed lover. She lives in the mirror and gives Christine advice on fashion. In the final episode, which takes place during Halloween, Vivienne takes corporeal form and goes out on a date with her lover. Viv is shown having various gunshot wounds to her back, while her date has a gunshot wound to the temple, implying their deaths are the result of a murder-suicide committed by the lover.
- Cousin Evie (portrayed by Colleen Smith) – Christine's insane cousin who is a widowed duchess. She discovers her parents' wills left everything to Christine and plots to kill her so that she can inherit.
- Norman (portrayed by Adam Mayfield) – Christine's lover who she meets at the graveyard while visiting her grandmother. He is a serial killer and comes to dinner regularly.
- Mr. Ketcham (portrayed by Steven Porter) – Christine's grumpy neighbor. He dislikes Christine and often complains about the creatures she lives with.

== Production ==
Netflix had expressed interest in a goth-inspired series for a long time. McConnell, who already had a large following on Reddit and Instagram, pitched the show to Netflix and Brian Henson. Following the success of Julie's Greenroom, which had been released in early 2017, Netflix expressly wanted the Jim Henson company to produce the show. The company claimed that it was coordinating many other projects, however, Henson Alternative picked up the show.

Filming began in early 2017, and the series was released on October 12, 2018. McConnell was principally responsible for editing and post-production. She shot and edited many of the promotional posters herself, and recorded her own voiceovers for the baking segments of each episode.

== Episodes ==
No.	Title	Directed by	Written by	Original release date	Prod. code
1	"Snacks for Strays"	Kirk R. Thatcher	Kirk R. Thatcher	October 12, 2018	101
Christine discovers Edgar the werewolf on her front doorstep, and makes peanut butter and chocolate bones, constructs a decorated cake mansion, and a creature out of cereal treats to welcome him into the household.
2	"Gifts for Noisy Neighbors"	Kirk R. Thatcher	Kirk R. Thatcher	October 12, 2018	102
Next door neighbor Mr. Ketcham visits to complain about the noise, so Christine makes him some spooky cookies, peppermint bark horns and hand-carved candles as a good will gesture. While she is busy baking, the creatures band together to kidnap and torture him. He accepts the gifts, but refuses her apologies.
3	"The Dinner Date"	Kirk R. Thatcher	Kirk R. Thatcher	October 12, 2018	103
Christine gets clothing advice from Vivienne, and makes wolf claw donuts for her dead grandmother, who she visits that afternoon. At the cemetery she meets Norman, and invites him to dinner. She sews a dress and makes a ‘classic’ chicken pot pie. Norman appears suspiciously familiar with knives, but they both find each other attractive.
4	"A Spirited Tea Party"	Kirk R. Thatcher	Kirk R. Thatcher	October 12, 2018	104
When Christine’s cousin Evie comes to visit, Christine plans a tea party, making cups and plates out of chocolate. But after finding a will that leaves everything to Christine, her cousin decides to kill her. Two Mental Hospital Orderlies arrive and the axe wielding Evie is taken away.
5	"A Cake for Rose"	Kirk R. Thatcher	Kirk R. Thatcher	October 12, 2018	105
It’s Rose’s birthday today. Christine and the creatures want to plan a surprise party for her. Christine makes a cake in the shape of Rose. But Rose is suspicious and thinks that Christine is making her ‘replacement’. In anger, she decides to set the house on fire. But after Christine stops Rose's plan, Christine and her creatures surprise Rose with some gifts and treats.
6	"Halloween Tricks & Treats"	Kirk R. Thatcher	Kirk R. Thatcher	October 12, 2018	106
It’s Halloween, and Christine has made special cookies for the day. Norman comes over to help with the trick or treaters. Christine makes caramel treats that look like real spiders for the children. Evie returns, and kills Rose. Norman disposes of Christine’s cousin, and Christine brings Rose back to life.

== Reception ==
The show received critical praise for the mixture of retro styling and Gothic aesthetic, use of puppetry, and quirky charm of the series, while pointing out that lack of directions, unfamiliarity with some of the specialist materials used, and the elaborate construction of the creations would mean making them was beyond most home cooks.

The New Yorker commented that "As cooking lessons, McConnell's demos are almost entirely useless", but the show, "like her Instagram, is beautiful, morbid, bizarre, and raunchy [and] becomes a wonderfully fantastical take on the classic dump-and-stir cooking show".

Emma Stefansky of Thrillist also posted a positive review, calling it "a perfectly creepy cooking show". The Washington Post labelled her creations "elaborate dishes that are simultaneously delicious and disturbing". The Daily Dot described the series as "silly, sly, and utterly charming". USA Today listed it as one of their "top five best baking TV shows to binge-watch this weekend".
