= List of Hazbin Hotel and Helluva Boss characters =

List of characters in the animated series Hazbin Hotel and Helluva Boss

Hazbin Hotel and Helluva Boss are two American animated series created, directed, written, and produced by Vivienne "VivziePop" Medrano, animated primarily by SpindleHorse Toons, and set in Hell. Some of the characters of the shows were originally developed for Medrano's cancelled webcomic series ZooPhobia.

Hazbin Hotel initially focuses on seven characters: Charlie Morningstar, princess of Hell and owner of the Hazbin Hotel, which offers sinners a chance at redemption to enter Heaven; Vaggi, her girlfriend; hotel patrons Angel Dust and Sir Pentious; Alastor, the powerful "Radio Demon" and Charlie's business partner; Husk, the hotel's bartender; and Niffty, the hotel's maid. The first season additionally focuses on the antagonist Adam, the first man and leader of Heaven's angelic army ("Exorcists") who leads an annual Extermination of Hell's sinners, while the second season additionally focuses on the antagonist Vox, a TV-headed demon and CEO of a media and tech company.

Helluva Boss initially focuses on five characters: Blitzo, an imp and head of the assassination company I.M.P.; Moxxie and Millie, a married imp couple employed at I.M.P.; Loona, Blitzo's adopted hellhound daughter; and Stolas, a Goetian prince of Hell, whom Blitzo has an intimate relationship with. The second season further focuses on Fizzarolli, a jester celebrity and Blitzo's childhood friend.

Both series also feature numerous supporting characters, each of whom plays a prominent role in a story arc. Included among them are the angels of Heaven, many other sinners and Hellborn demons, the Seven Deadly Sins, and the overlords of Hell.

== Principal characters of Hazbin Hotel ==
=== Charlie Morningstar ===
Charlie (left) and Vaggi (right) as depicted in Hazbin Hotel

Charlie Morningstar (voiced by Jill Harris in the pilot, singing voice in the pilot by Elsie Lovelock, and Erika Henningsen in the series) is the main protagonist and founder of the Hazbin Hotel. She is the daughter of King Lucifer and Queen Lilith, and was born in Hell. Charlie is optimistic and cares deeply for the well-being of her people, which is not taken seriously by the majority of demons in Hell. She is bisexual.

=== Vaggi ===
Vaggie / Vaggi (voiced by Monica Franco in the pilot and Stephanie Beatriz in the series) is the manager of the Hazbin Hotel and Charlie's lesbian girlfriend. She is highly supportive of Charlie and has a quick temper, but she often tries to be a level-headed and rational person, and she struggles to keep the hotel's image from being tarnished by Charlie and Angel Dust's antics. Vaggi was once an Exorcist angel, but after sparing a defenseless demon child, she was betrayed by Lute, stripped of her position, and mutilated. She was saved by Charlie, who, initially unaware of her angelic nature, fell in love with her. Her name is initially spelled "Vaggie" until she changes it to "Vaggi" in the second season. She was originally a character in the webcomic ZooPhobia, where she was called "Vaggie Motha".

=== Angel Dust ===
Anthony "Angel Dust" (voiced by Michael Kovach in the pilot and Blake Roman in the series), or simply Angel, is a gay spider demon, an adult entertainer, and the first volunteer for Charlie's rehabilitation program. He does not take Charlie's cause seriously, and often gets into mischief behind her back. He is in a toxic relationship with his abusive boss, Valentino. Despite Angel Dust's insolence, he genuinely cares about his friends and strives to better himself, even if he is not keen on showing his softer side. He was originally a character in the webcomic ZooPhobia.

=== Alastor ===
Alastor (voiced by Edward Bosco in the pilot, singing voice in the pilot by Gabriel C. Brown, and Amir Talai in the series), also known as The Radio Demon, is an eccentric, asexual overlord of Hell. He was once a New Orleans-based radio broadcaster in the early 20th century who moonlighted as a serial killer, only to be killed himself when he was mistaken for a deer by hunters and shot while he attempted to hide a dead body in the woods, thus, sending him to Hell; as such, his demon form boasts many deer-like characteristics. His voice has an effect that imitates radio static, complete with sound effects and theme music. His charming and elegant exterior hides a twisted and sadistic mindset. He offers his powers to Charlie to help her maintain her goal of running the hotel, but only for his own amusement, as he enjoys watching demons struggle to redeem themselves only to fall from grace. He has rivalries with many characters, including Vox, Sir Pentious, and Lucifer. He is trapped in a deal with Rosie, who granted him his power. He was originally a character in the webcomic ZooPhobia.

=== Husk ===
Husk (voiced by Mick Lauer in the pilot and Keith David in the series), also known as Husker, is a pansexual, ill-tempered, gambling alcoholic cat demon. Alastor summons him to serve as the bartender of the hotel in the series pilot. It is revealed in "Masquerade" that he was once an overlord of Hell, but due to his gambling addiction, he was forced to sell his soul to Alastor in order to keep his powers, while losing his status. Despite being an irritable drunk, Husk is shown to be wise and empathetic, especially in his friendship with Angel Dust. He was originally a character in the webcomic ZooPhobia.

=== Niffty ===
Niffty (voiced by Michelle Marie in the pilot and Kimiko Glenn in the series) is a small, hyperactive cyclops demon from the 1950s who is obsessed with cleanliness and men. She is summoned by Alastor to serve as the hotel's maid in the series pilot. She is the only straight character in the hotel as of the series premiere. Despite her macabre and often creepy mannerisms, including hints of sadomasochism, she usually means no harm. However, in "The Show Must Go On", she delivers the killing blow to Adam by stabbing him in the back. She is also fluent in Japanese.

=== Sir Pentious ===
Pendleton "Sir Pentious" (voiced by Will Stamper in the pilot and Alex Brightman in the series) is an anthropomorphic bisexual cobra demon from the Victorian era, and a skillful inventor. He is recruited by Vox to spy on Alastor in the hotel, but is ungraciously fired after being found out. Charlie offers him a second chance, and he chooses to become an official patron at the hotel, touched by Charlie's compassion. He is shown to have feelings for Cherri Bomb. In "The Show Must Go On", Sir Pentious sacrifices himself to stop Adam, and is redeemed and sent to Heaven. The second season sees Pentious desperately trying to make contact with his friends in Hell, and ultimately assisting in proving to all of Hell that redemption is possible through a broadcast from Heaven; this season also reveals the sin that condemned him to Hell - having done nothing to prevent one of his former clients from murdering a woman, and staying silent when said client killed five more women. He created several small, sentient eggs, which he refers to as his "Egg Boiz", who serve as his loyal minions.

=== Adam ===
Adam (voiced by Brightman) is the first human, based on Adam, as well as a high-ranking angel in Heaven and the main antagonist of the first season. He commands the Exorcist angels, and by extension the Exterminations of Hell. He is a narcissistic, self-centered, and immature leader who dismisses and mocks Charlie's idea of sinners ascending to Heaven. He is shown to want revenge on Hell for killing one of his Exorcist angels. In "The Show Must Go On", he is killed by Niffty during a battle between Heaven and Hell. He appears again in the second season as a hallucination witnessed by Lute. He is straight.

=== The Vees ===
The Vees are a trio of Overlords of Hell and a close group of friends. They are significant antagonists in the second season.

- Vincent "Vox" Whittman (voiced by Christian Borle), the de facto leader of the Vees, as well as a rival of Alastor's. Vox is a bisexual television demon who runs the tech company VoxTek. A television weather presenter in his mortal life, he committed a string of murders to climb to the top of the television business, only to be killed and sent to Hell when a suspended television monitor fell and landed on his head, electrocuting him. He serves as the main antagonist of the second season, where he builds a following of Sinners and declares war on Heaven as part of a grand scheme for power, which would culminate in him conquering Heaven. Vox's scheme gradually creates a rift between him and the other Vees, and ultimately fails when he loses their support as all of Hell joins forces to destroy the cannon that Vox planned to use against Heaven, while Vox himself is reduced to nothing more than his TV-monitor head.
- Valentino, or simply Val (voiced by Joel Perez), a pansexual Hispanic moth demon and porn studio owner who is Angel Dust's abusive boss. Following Vox's defeat at the end of the second season, he assumes the former's position at VoxTek.
- Velvette (voiced by Lilli Cooper), a lesbian British doll demon who runs the fashion industry of Hell. She is often seen using a smartphone and is able to fight with it.

== Supporting characters in Hazbin Hotel ==
=== Rulers of Hell ===
Lucifer Morningstar as depicted in Hazbin Hotel

Lucifer, Lilith, and Charlie comprise Hell's royal family.

- Lucifer Morningstar (voiced by Jeremy Jordan), the king of Hell and Charlie's father. He represents the sin of Pride. He was once an angel, but Heaven rejected him and deemed him a troublemaker. After falling for the first woman, Lilith, he convinced Eve, the second woman, to eat the Fruit of Knowledge in an attempt to inspire her with free will. However, this released evil on Earth, and inadvertently created Hell, where Lucifer and Lilith were subsequently banished by Heaven. Lucifer exhibits a comical personality, which compensates for depression, and has a genuine love for his daughter. In "The Show Must Go On", he saves Charlie from Adam during the Extermination and helps her rebuild her hotel. In the finale of season 2, he is used as the power source for Vox's weapon. He is pansexual. He is based on Lucifer.
- Lilith, the queen of Hell and Charlie's mother. She was the first woman, who left Adam for Lucifer, was banished to Hell with him, and married him. She left Lucifer sometime after Charlie was born. In the first episode of Hazbin Hotel, she is stated to have been away on important business for seven years. In "The Show Must Go On", it is revealed that she has been hiding out in Heaven. She is based on Lilith.

=== Overlords of Hell ===
The overlords are sinners who were once humans on Earth, and have gained significant amounts of power in Hell.

- Carmilla Carmine (voiced by Daphne Rubin-Vega), a weapons dealer who killed an Exorcist angel to protect her daughters, Clara and Odette. She and her daughters salvage angelic weapons after Exterminations to be sold in Hell. She is close friends with Zestial.
- Hatchet (voiced by Patrick Stump), a red-haired reptile-like demon. Rivals with Prick.
- Maestro (voiced by Perez), an overlord with a flaming skull for a head.
- Prick (voiced by Andrew Durand), a Western-themed cactus-like demon. Rivals with Hatchet.
- Rosie (voiced by Leslie Kritzer), the owner of an emporium in Cannibal Town, as well as of Alastor's soul.
- Zeezi (voiced by Alex Newell), a gigantic dinosaur-like demon.
- Zestial (voiced by James Monroe Iglehart), an ancient spider-like demon who is one of Hell's oldest overlords and feared among sinners. He is close friends with Carmilla Carmine. In season 2, he is disappointed at Carmilla for helping Vox build a cannon to attack heaven. In the finale of season 2, he and the other overlords help destroy the cannon.

=== Other inhabitants of Hell ===
In addition to the rulers and overlords of Hell, other beings reside in Hell, including the sinners, who were originally humans on Earth, and the indigenous Hellborns.

==== Sinners ====
- Baxter (voiced by Kevin Del Aguila), an anglerfish-like sinner and mad scientist who once worked for VoxTek, creating their entire security system. He joins the Hazbin Hotel as a guest in Season 2 to study redemption. He was once lab partners with Pentious, but they split up because Pentious found Baxter's experiments on the Egg Boiz to be cruel. In the season 2 finale, he helps defeat the Vees. He is LGBTQ.
- Cherri Bomb (voiced by Krystal LaPorte in the pilot and Krystina Alabado in the series), a one-eyed bisexual Australian punk girl, Angel Dust's best friend, and Sir Pentious's love interest. She serves as an ally to the Hazbin Hotel in season 1 before formally joining in season 2.
- Katie Killjoy (voiced by Faye Mata in the pilot and Brandon Rogers in the series), the narcissistic main anchor of 666 News, a news channel in Hell.
- Mimzy (voiced by Sarah Stiles), a short and chubby demon. She is a friend of Alastor's, as she knew him when they were both still alive. She constantly finds herself in trouble with other demons, and goes to Alastor to help her out.
- Salina (voiced by Alabado), a sinner who is exploited by the Vees during the season 2 musical number "Hazbin Guarantee (Trust Us)".
- Susan (voiced by Glenn), an "ornery old bitch" in Cannibal Town whom Rosie and Alastor dislike.
- Tom Trench (voiced by Joshua Tomar in the pilot and Talai in the series), 666 News' assistant anchor, who has a gas mask face and is frequently abused by Katie.
- Travis (voiced by Don Darryl Rivera), a demon whom Angel Dust had sex with in the Hazbin Hotel pilot, who is also an assistant director of Valentino. He makes further cameo appearances in the music video for "Addict", the Helluva Boss episode "Spring Broken", and various episodes of Hazbin Hotel.

==== Hellborns ====
- The Egg Boiz (voiced by Joe Gran in the pilot and Blake Roman in the series), Sir Pentious' loyal egg minions which were created by himself and Baxter. In "The Show Must Go On", all but one, Frank, are killed in battle.
- Fat Nuggets, Angel Dust's demonic pet pig.
- KeeKee, Charlie's demonic pet cat.
- Kitty, a robotic jester that serves as Valentino's assistant.
- Razzle and Dazzle, two small goat demons who are Lucifer's pets and serve as Charlie's bodyguards. In "The Show Must Go On", Dazzle is killed by Lute while protecting Vaggi.
- Shok.wav, Vox's giant demonic pet cyborg shark.

=== Inhabitants of Heaven ===
- Abel (voiced by Stump), Adam's meek son who becomes the new head of the Exorcist Army after Adam's death. Based on Abel. He is straight.
- Emily (voiced by Shoba Narayan), a young seraphim angel, and the only angel who believes in Charlie's idea of redemption. She looks up to Sera before it is revealed that Sera permitted the Exterminations of Hell to take place. In "Welcome to Heaven", she vows to help Charlie. In the finale of season 2, she loses a wing while trying to save Alastor. She is LGBTQ.
- Exorcists, angels sent by Heaven to purge Hell each year in an "Extermination" to manage its overpopulation and prevent rebellion.
  - Lute (voiced by Jessica Vosk), Adam's (and later Abel's) ruthless second-in-command. Angry over Adam's death and the redemption of Sir Pentious, she vows revenge against Charlie and the hotel, seeking to enact her vengeance by killing the person closest to Charlie – Vaggi. Ultimately, Abel manages to stop her.
- Molly, Angel Dust's twin sister. She has a spider-like appearance, similar to her brother.
- Saint Peter (voiced by Darren Criss), the gatekeeper of Heaven. Based on Saint Peter.
- Sera (voiced by Patina Miller), the head seraphim of Heaven, Emily's older sister, and the angel who permitted Adam to carry out the Exterminations. She works to keep the knowledge of this annual occurrence from all angels in Heaven, save for those who are involved in it, until Adam accidentally reveals it to all of Heaven. The second season sees Sera confront her remorse over permitting the Exterminations after Sir Pentious' arrival in Heaven proves that Charlie's theories of redemption are correct; she later allies with Pentious to prove to all of Hell that the redemption of Sinners is indeed possible before Vox can begin his attack on Heaven. She is a lesbian.
- The Speaker of God (voiced by Liz Callaway), a kind-hearted bird-like angel.

== Principal characters of Helluva Boss ==
=== Blitzo ===
Blitzo Buckzo (first name stylized as "Blitzø"; voiced by Brandon Rogers, singing voice in "Truth Seekers" by Michael Romeo Ruocco, child voice by Mason Blomberg) is a pansexual bombastic and immature but highly competent assassin imp, the founder of I.M.P. (Immediate Murder Professionals), and the protagonist of Helluva Boss. He has an on-and-off relationship with Stolas, a royal demon of Hell. Blitzo was a circus performer in his youth, but after accidentally causing a fire which resulted in the death of his mother and the disfiguring of his best friend Fizzarolli, he left the circus. Trauma caused by the incident led him to suffer from guilt and insecurities, which he hides with his brash outward personality. Despite this hard exterior, he is fundamentally a good man at heart and is shown to deeply care for his employees. He adopted a daughter, a hellhound named Loona. (Note: @blitzorodeo; (July 26, 2020). "Haha! Guess what my sexuality is~❤️" – via Instagram.) (Note: Helluva Boss [@IMPmurderpros] (June 26, 2024). "HAPPY PRIDE MONTH FROM HELLUVA BOSS" (Tweet) – via X (formerly Twitter).)

=== Moxxie ===
Moxxie Knolastname (voiced by Richard Steven Horvitz) is a bisexual neurotic and kindhearted imp who serves as the straight man weapons expert of I.M.P., and is married to Millie. He is easily annoyed by Blitzo's immaturity. He was born into a crime family. After being incarcerated following a heist gone wrong, he met Blitzo and decided to work for him after the two escaped prison.

=== Millie ===
Mildred "Millie" Knolastname (née Haymurder; voiced by Erica Lindbeck in the pilot and Vivian Nixon in the series) is a straight bubbly and good-natured imp bruiser of I.M.P., and is married to Moxxie. She is an extrovert and is not afraid to speak her mind, whether she's expressing excitement or scolding a coworker. She is also highly protective of Moxxie, often going into a fit of rage if he is in danger.

=== Loona ===
Loona (voiced by Lindbeck) is a bisexual, irritable, sarcastic, hellhound and I.M.P.'s receptionist. She generally has no interest in matters going on around her. Loona is rude and apathetic towards her colleagues. She is the adopted daughter of Blitzo, to whom she occasionally shows a softer side. She struggles with making friends, although she has a crush on a hellhound named Vortex.

=== Stolas ===
Stolas (voiced by Brock Baker in the pilot, Bryce Pinkham in the series, (Note: Baker, Brock [@TheBryceCapades] (October 31, 2020). "This year for Halloween @VivziePop turned me into a Hell Owl with desperate Hell Owl needs! Watch episode one of #Helluvaboss on YouTube (FYI- adult humor, not suitable for the kiddos) #Stolas #VoiceActors #HappyHalloween https://youtu.be/el_PChGfJN8" (Tweet) – via Twitter.) child voice by Leander Lewis) is a gay owl-like prince of the Ars Goetia, inspired by Stolas of the Ars Goetia in the Lesser Key of Solomon, in the Ars Goetia circle. He has a complicated relationship with Blitzo. He is unhappily married to Stella, and has a daughter named Octavia. He divorces Stella after she discovers his affair with Blitzo. In the second-to-last episode of Season 2, he loses all his power and wealth to his ex-brother-in-law, Andrealphus.

=== Fizzarolli ===
Fizzarolli (voiced by Brightman, child voice by Remy Edgerly), or simply Fizz, is a gay jester-like demon, Asmodeus' boyfriend, a childhood best friend of Blitzo, and the brand icon of Mammon. Fizz and Blitzo were best friends in their youth, but after Blitzo caused a fire which disfigured Fizz, the latter resented him. The two eventually make amends after Blitzo apologizes to Fizz.

== Supporting characters in Helluva Boss ==
=== The Seven Deadly Sins ===
Note that Lucifer represents the sin of Pride.

- Asmodeus (voiced by Iglehart), also known as Ozzie, a pansexual demon who is the King of Lust and the owner of a popular club in the Lust Ring of Hell. He is in a romantic relationship with Fizzarolli. Based on Asmodeus.
- Beelzebub (speaking voice by Kesha for Season 1–2 and Rochelle Diamante from Season 3 onwards, singing voice by Diamante), also known as Bee, a pansexual fox-like demon, the Queen of Gluttony, and Vortex's girlfriend. Based on Beelzebub.
- Belphegor, the Queen of Sloth. A lethargic, sheep-like demon who controls the drug industry of Hell. Based on Belphegor.
- Leviathan, the Queen of Envy. A leviathan-like demon with two heads.
- Mammon (voiced by Michael Cusack), the King of Greed. An asexual jester-like demon who is Fizzarolli's boss, and the cause of Fizzarolli's fame. He is manipulative and abusive, which leads Fizzarolli to quit working for him. Based on Mammon.
- Satan (voiced by Patrick Page), the dragon-like King of Wrath. He created the imps to be subservient workers in Hell. He struggles to control his rage. Based on Satan.

=== Goetial demons ===
- Andrealphus (voiced by Jason LaShea), Stella's sly, gay peacock-like brother. Based on Andrealphus. He has magic ice powers.
- Octavia (voiced by Barrett Wilbert Weed, child voice by Juliana Sada), or simply Via, Stolas and Stella's scornful and disenfranchised asexual 17-year-old (later 18-year-old) daughter. She is irritated by her father's infidelity and feels that he does not value her, due to his complicated relationship to Blitzo.
- Paimon (voiced by Jonathan Freeman), Stolas' neglectful father. Based on Paimon.
- Stella (voiced by Georgina Leahy), Stolas' abusive and classist wife, and later ex. She grows furious with Stolas for cheating on her with Blitzo, going as far as to hire Striker to assassinate him.
- Vassago (voiced by Harvey Guillén), a gay parrot-like member of the Ars Goetia who makes his debut as a supporting character in Season 2. Based on Vassago. In "The Auction", it is revealed that he and Stolas were classmates and friends in their youth and were romantically interested in each other before Stolas married Stella.

=== Other inhabitants of Hell ===
==== Hellborns ====
- Alessio (voiced by Abe Goldfarb), Crimson's bodyguard.
- Arick "Burnie" Burnz (voiced by Rivera), also known as Creepzo, an antagonistic fan-turned-hater of Fizzarolli.
- Barbie Wire (voiced by Jinhee Joung), Blitzo's pansexual twin sister and former imp circus performer. She resents Blitzo for accidentally killing their mother.
- Cash Buckzo (voiced by Freeman), Blitzo's manipulative and greedy father, and the head of the circus in which Blitzo used to perform.
- Cassity (voiced by Maria Bamford), a manipulative imp and Millie's former assassination partner turned bitter nemesis.
- Chazwick "Chaz" Thurman (voiced by Eric Schwartz), a pansexual shark demon whom both Moxxie and Millie dated in the past. In the short "Mission: It's Chaz Funeral", he is revealed to have survived Crimson's wrath, secretly posing as his alleged twin brother "Zahc" and orchestrated a fake funeral, with many of the mourners having been individuals he had slept with.
- Crimson (voiced by Horvitz), Moxxie's abusive father and the leader of a large crime syndicate.
- Gigi and Russ, two hellhound friends of Loona.
- Glitz and Glam (both voiced by Faye Mata, singing voices by Mata and Allison Kaplan respectively), twin circus performers.
- Joe (voiced by Edward Bosco), Millie's father.
- Judge Jiner (voiced by Paulette Jones), an octopus-like judge.
- Kendra (voiced by Erica Luttrell), Barbie's girlfriend, and later ex.
- Lin (voiced by Su Jan Chase), Millie's mother.
- Mister Butler / Mortimer (voiced by Rivera), the head butler of the Goetial palace.
- Muffy (voiced by Vivienne Medrano) is an anthropomorphic goat who works as a receptionist at the clinic where Blitzo takes Loona to receive a vaccination shot.
- Robo Fizz (voiced by Brightman), a robotic duplicate of Fizzarolli who performs at the Loo Loo Land amusement park before being defeated by Blitzo.
- Rolando (voiced by John Waters), a demon from the Envy Ring who disguises himself as a hotel manager in the living world. He has the ability to manipulate and possess his victims to commit his murders.
- Sallie May Haymurder (voiced by Morgana Ignis), Millie's transgender lesbian sister.
- Striker (voiced by Norman Reedus (season 1), Bosco (season 2 onward)), an imp who serves as Joe's farmhand before being revealed to be an assassin that Stella hired to kill Stolas.
- Tilla, Blitzo's mother and an imp circus performer. She was killed in a fire that Blitzo accidentally started. It is implied that she and Blitzo were very close before her death.
- Verosika Mayday (voiced by Cristina Vee), a rude and shameless pansexual succubus pop-star in Hell and on Earth. She is Blitzo's bitter ex-girlfriend. In "A Trial of Errors", she's revealed to be dating Wally Wackford.
- Vikki (voiced by Jinkx Monsoon), a poodle-like hellhound who has an antagonistic relationship with Loona.
- Vortex (voiced by Iglehart), or simply Tex, Verosika's hellhound bodyguard, and boyfriend of Beelzebub. He is also Loona's crush. He is straight.
- Wally Wackford (voiced by Rivera), an imp inventor. In "A Trial of Errors", Wally is revealed to be dating Verosika Mayday.
- Willow Wackford (voiced by Caroline Innerbichler), Wally's sister, Winston's daughter, and Sallie May's girlfriend.
- Winston Wackford (voiced by Tobin Bell, singing voice by Sam Haft), Wally and Willow's father.
- Yogirt (voiced by Jack Plotnick), Satan's therapist.

==== Sinners ====
- Emberlynn Pinkle (voiced by Monica Franco), an otaku girl who is attracted to all things demonic and monstrous.
- "Karen client" (voiced by Joung), a woman who hires I.M.P. to kill her ex-husband for leaving her for another man.
- Loopty Goopty (voiced by Rogers), an inventor who hires I.M.P. to kill his business partner, Lyle Lipton.
- Lyle Lipton (voiced by Michael James Ruocco), Loopty Goopty's business partner.
- Martha (voiced by Monsoon), the mistress of Mrs. Mayberry's husband. She maintains the public appearance of a wholesome and happy mother and wife, but she and her family are murderous cannibals behind closed doors. She is married, and has a son and a daughter. She and the rest of her family are killed in "Murder Family". In "Apology Tour", it is revealed that she went to Hell following her death and entered a relationship with Mrs. Mayberry. She is bisexual.
- Mrs. Mayberry (voiced by Mara Wilson), a former human teacher who murdered her husband for cheating on her, before committing suicide in front of her students. After Mrs. Mayberry arrived in Hell, she hires I.M.P. to kill Martha, the woman her husband cheated with, before entering a relationship with Martha when she arrives in Hell. She is a lesbian.
- Rita (voiced by Monsoon), a former resident of the One Star Wonder hotel who was murdered by Rolando, which leads her to hire I.M.P. to investigate the establishment, which she believes to be haunted.

=== Inhabitants of Heaven ===
- C.H.E.R.U.B., a group of cherubs who serve the opposite purpose of I.M.P., helping and blessing humans on orders of souls in Heaven. After being stranded on Earth, they partner with D.H.O.R.K.S. to seek revenge on Blitzo. Members of C.H.E.R.U.B. include:
  - Cletus (voiced by Rivera), a sensible pink cherub, and the leader of the group. He resembles a human baby.
  - Collin (voiced by Jayden Libran), a meek purple cherub. He resembles a lamb.
  - Keenie (voiced by Medrano), a yellow and spritely cherub. She resembles a lamb.
- Deerie (voiced by Medrano), a snarky deer-like cherub who bans C.H.E.R.U.B. from reentering Heaven after they accidentally kill Lyle Lipton.

=== Inhabitants of Earth ===
- Agent One (voiced by Michael Romeo Ruocco), an agent from an organization called D.H.O.R.K.S., who seek to protect the world from demons.
- Agent Two (voiced by Luttrell), an agent from D.H.O.R.K.S. and Agent One's partner.
- Bethany Ghostfucker (voiced by Henningsen), the star of a ghost hunting TV show about trying to have sex with ghosts.
- Bigfoot / Mayor (voiced by Tom Kenny), a mythical ape-like cryptid who wanders the woods in the Pacific Northwest, secretly living a double life as a town mayor.
- Counselor Jimmy (voiced by Franco), a camp counselor who works with Barbie Wire and is a target of I.M.P.'s.
- Driveso (voiced by Lyle Rath), a reckless driver who incites Blitzo's road rage.
- Eddie (voiced by Horvitz), a child whom I.M.P. kills in the Helluva Boss pilot.
- Frank McTickly Wrigglers (voiced by Plotnick), an orphan charity donor and children's entertainer.
- Gerardo Velazquez (voiced by Jorge R. Gutierrez), a Mexican goat farmer who captures Blitzo and claims he is a chupacabra.
- Homie Joey (voiced by Ian Hecox), Jordie's roommate, supporter, and frequent prank target.
- Jordie Jordan (voiced by Anthony Padilla), a rich and self-absorbed "nepo-baby" influencer known for his dangerous pranks.
- Luigi Paesano (voiced by Rath), mob boss father of Paulie Paesano.
- Martha's family: Martha's husband Ralphie (voiced by Maxwell Atoms) and their daughter and son (voiced by Juliana Sada and Dashiell McGaha-Schletter). They, along with Martha, are murderous cannibals behind closed doors and the antagonists of "Murder Family".
- Paulie Paesano (voiced by Rath), a reluctant mobster whom Moxxie tries to help escape from his life of crime.
- William Diddle, a CEO who is killed and subsequently impersonated by Blitzo.
- William Diddle's secretary (voiced by Grey DeLisle), a sycophantic secretary.

== Reception ==
=== Reception of Vaggi ===
Vaggi's character has been received positively, garnering particular attention for the development of her relationship with Charlie, her true motivations during the first season, and for Beatriz's singing performances: Animation Magazine summarized Vaggi's character as "tough but [with] a heart of gold". Screen Rant described Vaggi as "the backbone" and "best character" of Hazbin Hotel, calling her a "realistic and shrewder" character, and her and Charlie "a classic grumpy/happy duo", noting her day-to-day "interactions with the hotel’s staff and residents [as] always hilarious because she doesn't put up with anyone's nonsense", Comic Book Resources lauding them as "the perfect power couple". Decider complimented Vaggi's depiction as "a total simp" and her "sentimental and fluffy" moments with Charlie, while The A.V. Club described her as "com[ing] off as a carbon copy of Lake Bell’s deadpan Poison Ivy in Harley Quinn". Autostraddle praised Vaggi and Charlie's relationship as "the devilish heart" of the series, which "had its bumps and bruises throughout the season [without] a big breakup blowout or cheating [with] so many cute little moments [leading to the] last two episodes, where fixing their relationship is almost as important to Charlie as figuring out how to stop the extermination", concluding by lauding the series' "cute little couple-y moments that made [them] squeal with joy," and noting Vaggi's "pessimist[ic] surly demeanor". Tell-Tale TV described the relationship as "your stereotypical 'opposites attract' pairing [with] a lot of unexplored depth", complimenting Beatriz's singing voice, while noting it as "somewhat jarring compared to her speaking voice [though] nailing the vocal intricacies of her predecessor Monica Franco". The Illuminerdi called Beatriz "a perfect fit" for the role.

=== Reception of Lucifer Morningstar ===
Collider lauded "Jeremy Jordan's Lucifer [for having] stole[n] every single scene he was in. I did not know what to expect from the King of Hell, but he got the biggest laugh out of me by far [and] my favorite songs of the season." MXDWN lauded the "emotional scenes" between Lucifer and Charlie as "feel[ing] impactful and real within the story", while praising the "incredible chemistry" between Jordan as Lucifer and Amir Talai as Alastor; The Review Geek likewise complimenting the "emotional punch [in] Jordan's beautiful voice", which The Sea Hawk lauded as "utterly tearjerking and beautiful". Comic Book Resources noted "what makes Lucifer interesting [is] his air of mystery, which later evolves into his complexity [as] a charismatic guy with a few flaws that make the angelic man a little bit more human [in being] an insecure man who wants the best for his daughter, but his fears of being bad push him away", in particular praising Jordan's performance for how "that fear of not being good enough shines on through", noting him as "one of the most relatable characters in the series because of his everyday struggles", leaving him "among the most layered characters in Hazbin Hotel", praising his "humorous rivalry with Alastor [as] a highlight of Season 1". Screen Rant described the character as "quirky" and "bring[ing] depth" to the story, calling him "an easy-to-like character" and praising his design "with [its] multiple apples cleverly incorporated into his outfit", Polygon complimenting his depiction as "full of childhood whimsy". Catholic Review noted his depiction as "a mostly sympathetic figure [and] misunderstood rebel". The Illuminerdi lauded Jordan's vocal and acting abilities in his performance of "Hell's Greatest Dad" as "really add[ing] a comedic level we hadn’t seen before [while shining] a light on the type of fantasy filled dreamer Lucifer can be".

Study Breaks criticized Lucifer's "flawed idealism" while noting how "there's something about the devoted father-figure that really speaks to fans of the show". Hot Air dismissed Lucifer's depiction as a "good guy" as "trolling" while still noting how "there is a case to be made for his portrayal". BlazeTV similarly condemned Lucifer's depiction in the series as "heretical" and "ignorant of Christianity". The Washington Times also condemned this depiction as "unbiblical and an attempt from the enemy to twist the truth [and] lead one astray from God". Geek Girl Authority lauded Lucifer as a "favorite character", praising Jordan's "swoon-worthy Broadway tenor" in delivering his lines as "perfect for a literal angel". The American Family Association criticized the series "mak[ing] light of Satan [as] a positive spin on evil".
