= Gay men's flags =

Pride flags used to symbolize gay men

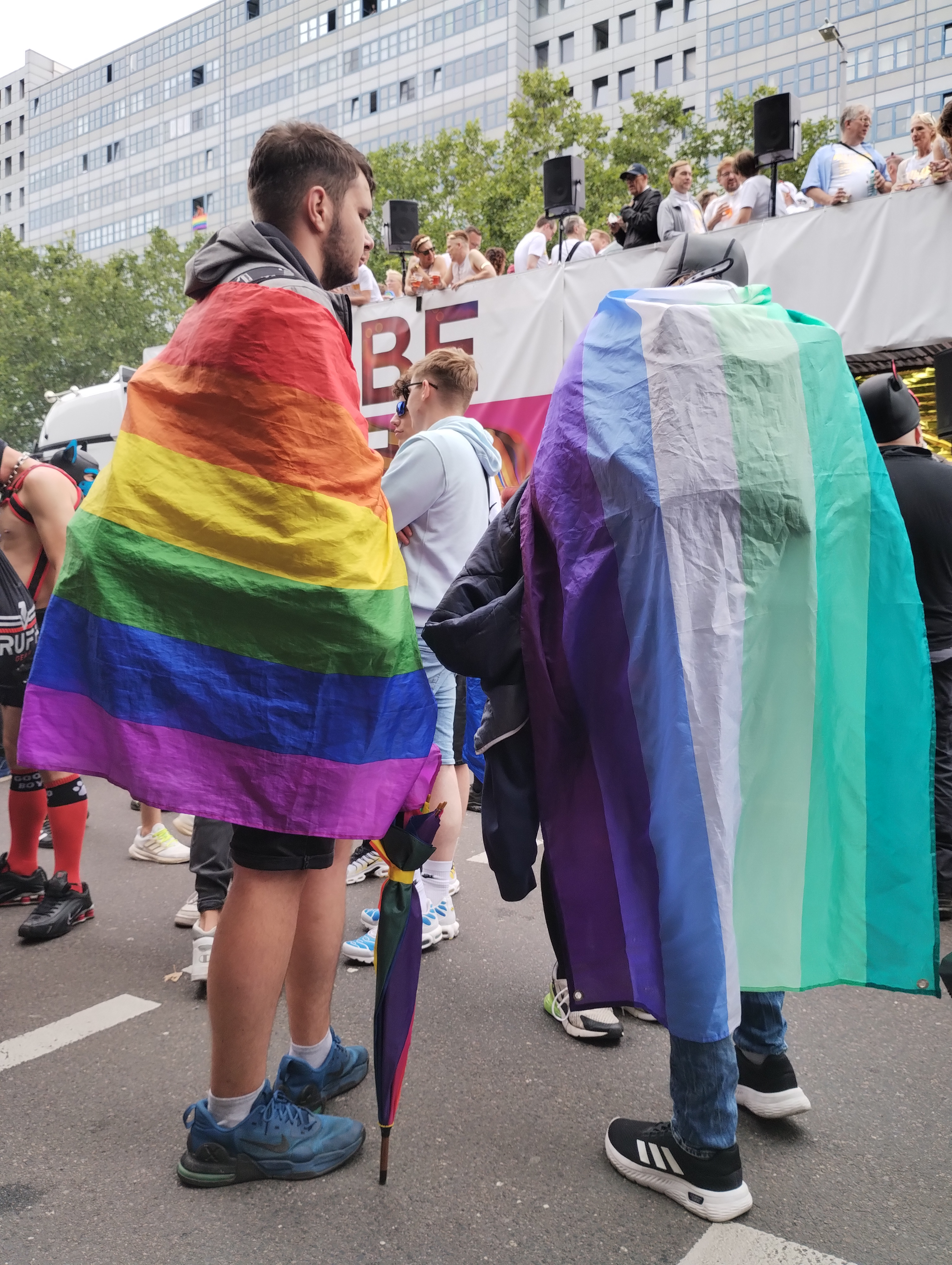
The rainbow flag (left) and the seven-stripe gay men’s pride flag (right) worn as capes at a pride event in Berlin, Germany

Various pride flags have been used to symbolize gay men. Rainbow flags have been used since 1978 to represent both gay men and the LGBTQ community as a whole. Since the 2010s, various designs have been proposed to specifically represent the gay male community. The flag shown below is the most common one today.

== Rainbow flags ==
The original rainbow pride flags were flown in celebration of the San Francisco Gay Freedom Day parade on June 25, 1978. According to a profile published in the Bay Area Reporter in 1985, Gilbert Baker "chose the rainbow motif because of its associations with the hippie movement of the 1960s, but notes that use of the design dates back to ancient Egypt".

Original eight stripe version designed by Gilbert Baker (1978)

Seven stripe version with hot pink color removed due to lack of fabric (1978–1979)

Six-stripe version with the turquoise color removed and the indigo color changed to royal blue (1979–present)

== Flags of the 2010s ==
The first known flag design made specifically for gay men was published online on October 9, 2018, on VK, a Russian website. It was designed by Valentin Belyaev in the mid-2010s or earlier to combat gayphobia, and it was based on the lesbian flag. It symbolizes the attraction of men to each other and the diversity of the gay community itself. It is sometimes known as the Uranian flag.

The first gay man flag design to be published online was designed by Mod Hermy of the Pride-Flags account on DeviantArt. It was first posted on Tumblr on August 24, 2016, and was based on the pink lesbian flag.

In March 2017, Gilbert Baker created a nine-stripe version of his original 1977 flag, featuring lavender, pink, turquoise, and indigo stripes alongside red, orange, yellow, green, and purple. According to Baker, the lavender stripe symbolizes diversity.

Another flag design for gay men, featuring green, teal, white, blue, and purple stripes, was designed by Tumblr user gayflagblog, a disabled trans man. Two versions, with seven and five stripes respectively, were released on July 10, 2019. The colors from turquoise to green represent community, healing and joy; the white stripe in the middle is an iteration of part of Monica Helms' trans flag design and includes people who are transgender, intersex, gender non-conforming, or non-binary; and the colors blue through purple represent pure love, strength, and diversity. This design is sometimes known as the Vincian flag, and referred to as the “ocean gay flag” by the flag designer and some users.

Flags for male homosexuality

Rainbow flag overlaid with a double black Mars symbol

Gilbert Baker's 2017 flag, nine stripes

Flag of seven blue, white and blue stripes

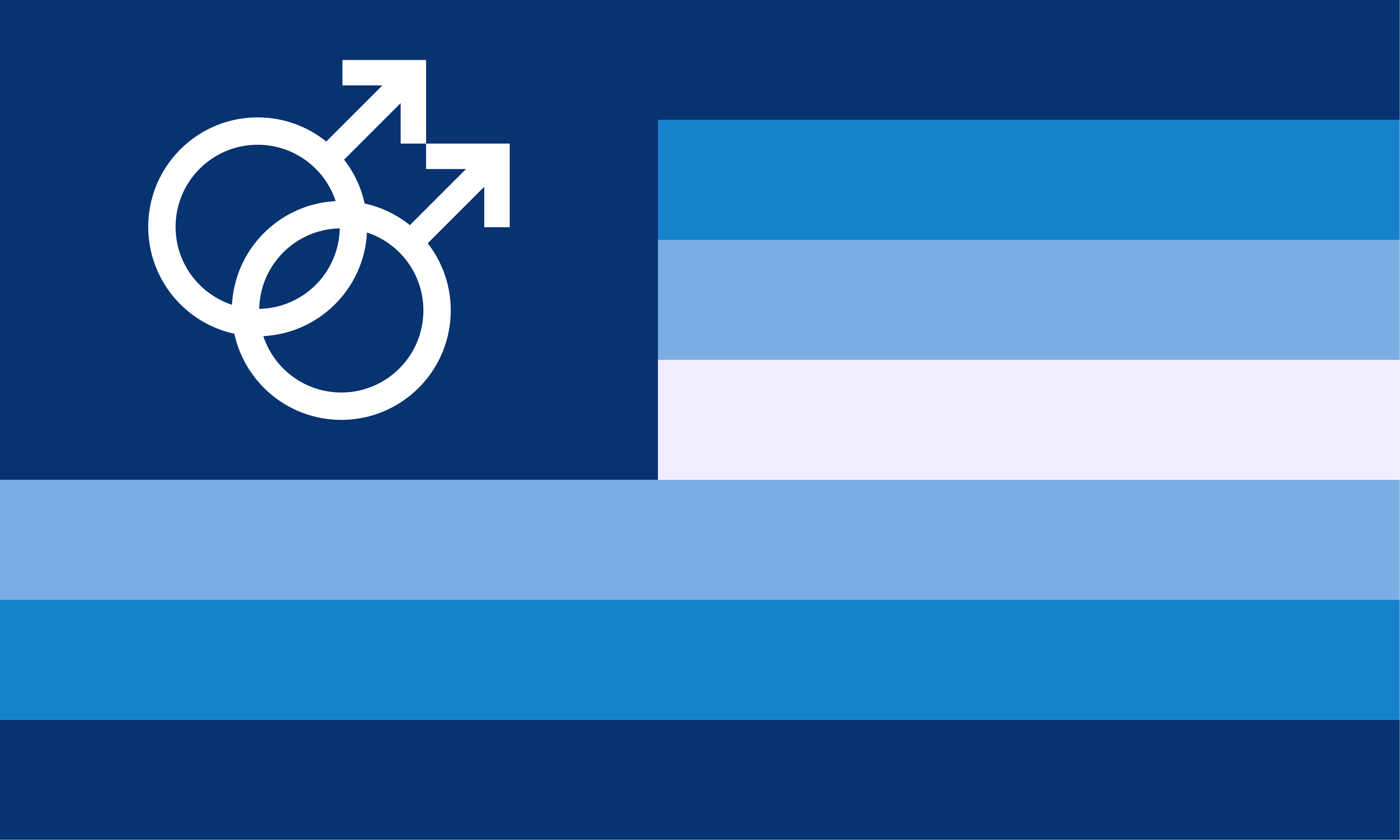
Uranist flag with double Mars symbol

Proposed flag, with shades of teal, pastel white, and blue.

Seven-stripe flag with green, teal, white, blue, and purple

Five-stripe flag by gayflagblog, iterated from the seven-stripe flag

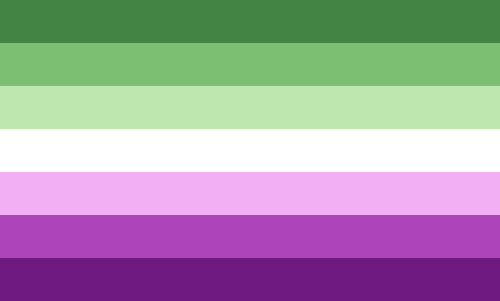
Flag by Ian Blázquez

== Subcultures ==
There is a flag for the bear, femboy, twink and otter subculture.

Bear flag

Femboy flag

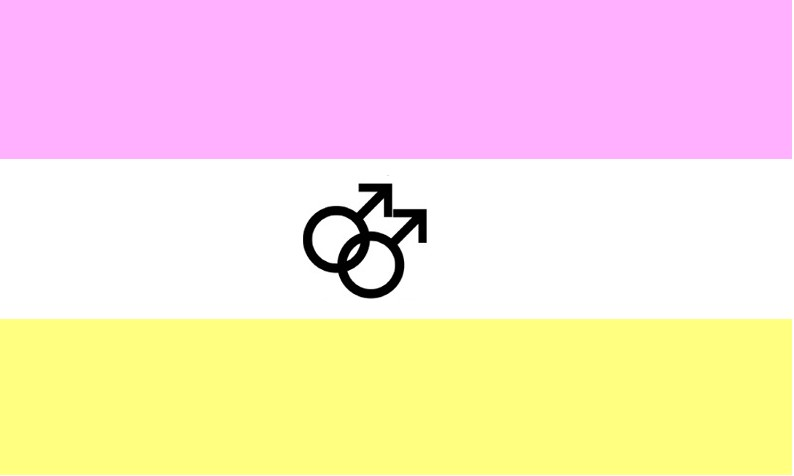
Twink flag

Otter flag

== See also ==
- LGBTQ symbols
