= Erica Lindbeck =

American voice actress (born 1992)

- Lindbeck at Animate! Philadelphia in 2026
- Born: May 29, 1992 (age 34); Boston, Massachusetts, U.S.
- Education: University of California, Los Angeles
- Occupation: Voice actress
- Years active: 2014–present
- Agent: Atlas Talent
- Website: ericalindbeck.com

Erica Lindbeck (born May 29, 1992) is an American voice actress best known as the third voice of Barbie in the eponymous media franchise, succeeding Kelly Sheridan in 2015 and being succeeded herself by America Young in 2018. She is also known for her work on English-dubbed Japanese anime and video games, and is also the voice of Loona in Helluva Boss.

== Career ==
Lindbeck graduated from the UCLA School of Theater, Film and Television in 2014. She is known for her voicework in English-language anime dubs. Her roles include Kaori Miyazono in Your Lie in April, Futaba Sakura from Persona 5, Eli Ayase in the Love Live! series, Irene Urzaiz in The Asterisk War, Ibara Naruse in Coppelion, Ritsuko Akagi in Neon Genesis Evangelion, Kanae Kotonami in Skip Beat! and Oei in Miss Hokusai. She and fellow voice actress Mela Lee hosted their own web series called Lindbeck and Lee with local voice actor guests.

In 2018, Lindbeck voiced the character Felicia Hardy/Black Cat in Insomniac's Spider-Man video game. She later voiced Ashley in WarioWare Gold.

In 2019, Lindbeck voiced Cassie Cage in NetherRealm's Mortal Kombat 11 video game. She also voiced Millie and Loona in the Helluva Boss pilot in 2019. She continued to portray Loona in the full series in 2020, with Vivian Nixon replacing her as Millie. As of 2019, she is the current voices of Blaze the Cat and Omochao in the Sonic the Hedgehog. In 2023, she voiced Ines and Silence in Arknights and Peppermint in Hi-Fi Rush.

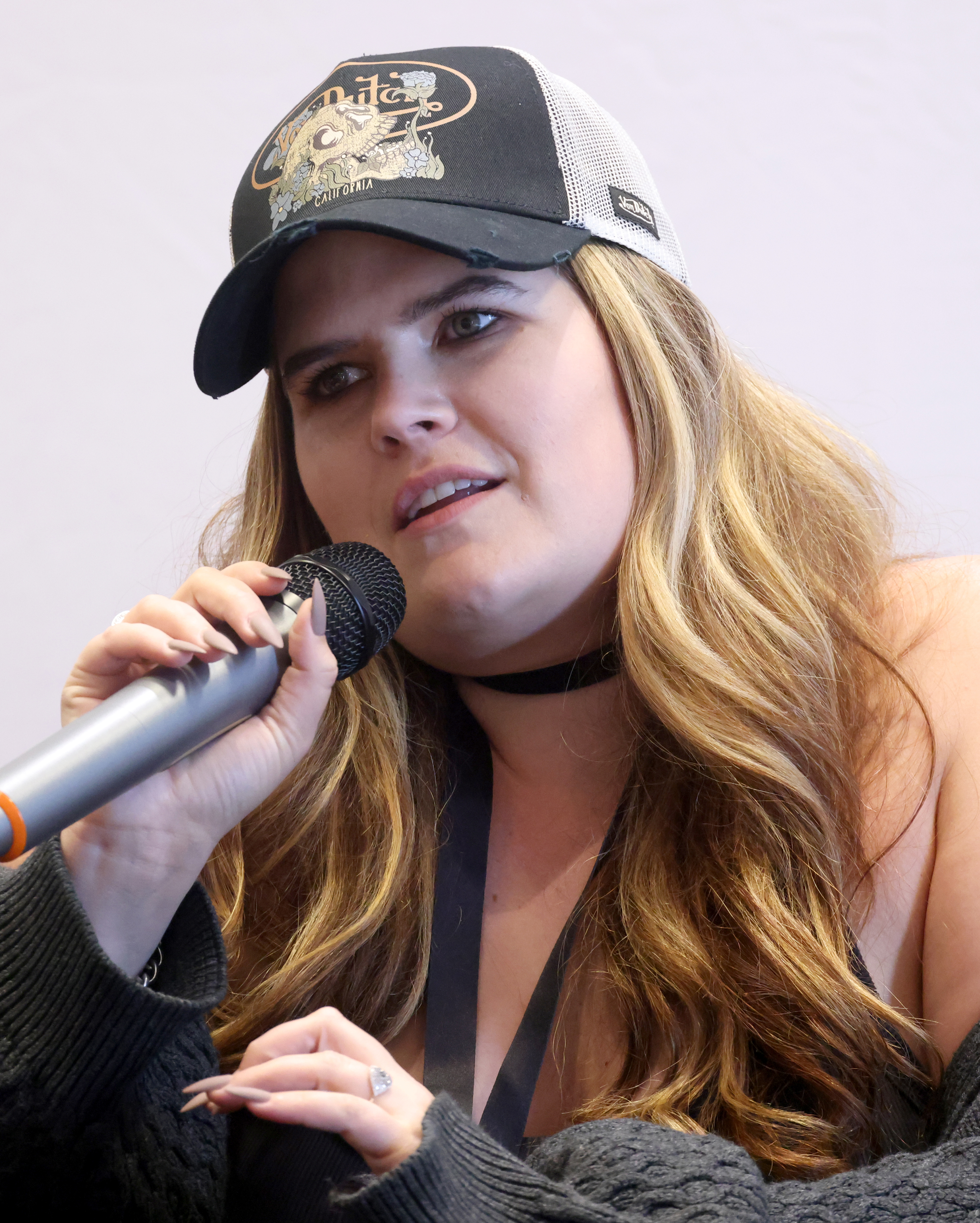
Lindbeck speaking in 2025 at an event in Glendale, Arizona

== Personal life ==
On February 3, 2020, Lindbeck came out as bisexual via Twitter. Lindbeck dated voice actor Billy Kametz until his death from colon cancer in June 2022.

On July 9, 2023, she left Twitter after criticizing a video for using an AI-generated voice of Futaba Sakura, a character she voiced, to sing Bo Burnham’s "Welcome to the Internet" without her permission. She was harassed by individuals on Twitter following her comments. The original video was willingly removed from YouTube by its creator, but the AI cover was reposted by additional accounts. Various other voice actors, such as Mike Pollock, Josh Keaton, Sean Chiplock, and Yuri Lowenthal, along with cartoonist Vivienne Medrano, stated their support for Lindbeck and their opposition to "the use of AI-generated voices". The account criticized by Lindbeck was later suspended by Twitter for violating the site's terms of service. She returned to the site and resumed posting a week later.

== Filmography ==
=== Anime ===
List of dubbing performances in anime
Year	Series	Role	Notes	Source
2014	Coppelion	Ibara Naruse		
2015	Magi: The Kingdom of Magic	Gyokuen Ren		
2015	Sword Art Online II	Nori		
2015	Fate/stay night: Unlimited Blade Works	Kaede Makidera		
2015–16	Aldnoah.Zero	Yuki Kaizuka		
2015–16	Durarara!!x2	Manami Mamiya		
2015–21	The Seven Deadly Sins	Jericho		
2016	Love Live! School Idol Project	Eli Ayase		
2016	Your Lie in April	Kaori Miyazono		
2016	Mobile Suit Gundam: Iron-Blooded Orphans	Azee Gurumin		
2016	Danganronpa 3: The End of Hope's Peak Academy	Physical Education Teacher		
2016	Charlotte	Sala Shane		
2016	Tales of Zestiria the X	Magilou		
2016	The Asterisk War	Irene Urzaiz		
2016–19	Mob Psycho 100	Tsuchiya		
2017	Anohana: The Flower We Saw That Day	Naruko "Anaru" Anjo		
2017	Hunter × Hunter	Pakunoda	2011 series	
2017	Berserk	Farnese	2016 series	
2017	Occultic;Nine	Touko Sumikaze		
2017	Glitter Force Doki Doki	Natalie Miller / Glitter Ace	Season 2; Netflix dub	
2017–18	Fate/Apocrypha	Mordred / Saber of Red	Netflix dub	
2018	Skip Beat!	Kanae Kotonami	limited release to sponsors in 2017, general release in 2018	
2018	Granblue Fantasy The Animation	Katalina Alize		
2018	Sword Gai: The Animation	Kyōka Kagami		
2018	Sailor Moon SuperS	Ves-Ves	Viz Media dub	
2018	Twin Star Exorcists	Kohana	Episode 1	
2018	FLCL Alternative	Hijiri Yajima		
2018–23	Boruto: Naruto Next Generations	Sumire Kakei		
2019	Marvel Future Avengers	Carol Danvers / Captain Marvel, Medusa		
2019	Neon Genesis Evangelion	Ritsuko Akagi	Netflix redub	
2020–22	Demon Slayer: Kimetsu no Yaiba	Daki, Spider Demon (Daughter)		
2020	Magia Record	Momoko Togame		
2020	Persona 5: The Animation	Futaba Sakura		
2022	Blue Period	Maki Kuwana, Yamamoto		
2022	Kakegurui Twin	Sayaka Igarashi	Netflix dub	
2023-26	My Hero Academia	Kaina "Lady Nagant" Tsutsumi	Season 6	
2024	T・P BON	Ream Stream	Netflix dub	
2025	City the Animation	Midori Nagumo, Kamome Adatara		
2026	Jujutsu Kaisen	Takako Uro		

=== Animation ===
List of voice performances in animation
Year	Title	Role	Notes	Source
2016	Be Cool, Scooby-Doo!	Beth	Ep. 21	
2017	Avengers Assemble	Jane Foster / Thunderstrike	Season 4	
2017	Transformers: Robots in Disguise	Windblade	Season 3, replacing Kristy Wu	
2018	DC Super Hero Girls	Mera		
2019–present	Helluva Boss	Loona, Millie (pilot episode)	YouTube web series; was replaced as Millie by Vivian Nixon	
2020	Kipo and the Age of Wonderbeasts	Kate	Episode: "Ratland"	
2020	ThunderCats Roar	Cheetara, WilyKit	Main role	
2020–23	The Owl House	Emira Blight		
2021–24	Arcane	Elora		
2021–22	Pacific Rim: The Black	Loa	Main role	
2022–26	Smiling Friends	Brittney, additional voices		
2023–24	Hailey's On It!	Joanne, Genesis		

=== Film ===
List of dubbing performances in feature films
Year	Title	Role	Notes	Source
2016	Love Live! The School Idol Movie	Eli Ayase		
2016	Miss Hokusai	Oei		
2019	Dragon Ball Super: Broly	Cheelai		
2019	Evangelion Death (True)^{2}	Ritsuko Akagi	Netflix redub	
2019	The End of Evangelion	Ritsuko Akagi	Netflix redub	
2019	Promare	Heris Ardebit		
2020	NiNoKuni	Saki Mishima	Netflix dub	
2021	Sailor Moon Eternal	VesVes/Sailor Vesta	Viz Media Dub	
2022	Bubble	Makoto	Netflix dub	
2022	Dragon Ball Super: Super Hero	Cheelai		

List of voice performances in direct-to-video and television films
Year	Title	Role	Notes	Source
2016	Barbie: Spy Squad	Barbie		
2016	Lupin the Third: Jigen's Gravestone	Queen Malta		
2016	Barbie: Dreamtopia	Barbie, Barbie as the Sugar Plum Fairy, The Forest Princess, The Sparkle Mountain Princess and The Rainbow Princess		
2016	Barbie: Star Light Adventure	Barbie (Princess Starlight)		
2016	Barbie & Her Sisters in A Puppy Chase	Barbie		
2017	Barbie: Video Game Hero	Barbie		
2017	Barbie: Dolphin Magic	Barbie		
2018	DC Super Hero Girls: Legends of Atlantis	Mera, Siren		
2020	Lego DC Shazam! Magic and Monsters	Greeter, Farmer		
2020	Digimon Adventure: Last Evolution Kizuna	Ayaka's Girlfriend		
2021	Monster Hunter: Legends of the Guild	Lea		
2020	Barbie: Princess Adventure	Princess/Queen Amelia		
2023	The Seven Deadly Sins: Grudge of Edinburgh Part 2	Jericho		

=== Video games ===
List of voice performances in video games
Year	Title	Role	Notes	Source
2015	Atelier Shallie: Alchemists of the Dusk Sea	Jurie Crotze	Also Atelier Shallie Plus	
2015	Omega Quintet	Kyoka		
2015	Danganronpa Another Episode: Ultra Despair Girls	Kotoko Utsugi		
2015	The Legend of Heroes: Trails of Cold Steel	Misty		
2015	Lego Dimensions	Hermione Granger		
2016–17	League of Legends	Taliyah, Zoe, Morgana		
2016	Smite	Terra		
2016	The Legend of Heroes: Trails of Cold Steel II	Vita Clotilde		
2016	Phoenix Wright: Ace Attorney − Spirit of Justice	Ema Skye, Bonny de Famme		
2016	Shin Megami Tensei IV: Apocalypse	Asahi		
2016	Dragon Ball Xenoverse 2	Time Patrollers		
2016	Exist Archive	Suzaku Himuro		
2016	Call of Duty: Infinite Warfare	Rollercoaster announcer	Zombies mode	
2017	Tales of Berseria	Magilou		
2017	NieR:Automata	Anemone		
2017	Persona 5	Futaba Sakura		
2017	Fire Emblem Echoes: Shadows of Valentia	Celica		
2017	Street Fighter V	Menat	DLC (Season 2)	
2017–18	Fire Emblem Heroes	Celica, Myrrh		
2018	Heroes of the Storm	Sally Whitemane		
2018	BlazBlue: Cross Tag Battle	Yuzuriha	DLC (Season 1)	
2018	WarioWare Gold	Ashley		
2018	World of Warcraft	Delaryn Summermoon	PC	
2018	Marvel's Spider-Man	Felicia Hardy / Black Cat		
2018	Mega Man 11	Roll		
2018	Soulcalibur VI	Sophitia Alexandra		
2018	Persona 5: Dancing in Starlight	Futaba Sakura	Also Persona 3: Dancing in Moonlight as DLC	
2018	Super Smash Bros. Ultimate	Futaba Sakura	DLC	
2018	Epic Seven	Alexa, Ruele, Destina		
2019	Mortal Kombat 11	Cassie Cage		
2019	Pokémon Masters	Maylene, Rachel		
2019	Code Vein	Coco		
2019	Bloodstained: Ritual of the Night	Miriam		
2019	Marvel Ultimate Alliance 3: The Black Order	Carol Danvers / Captain Marvel, Betsy Braddock / Psylocke		
2019	Fortnite: Save the World	Headhunter		
2019	Catherine: Full Body	Futaba Sakura		
2019	Daemon X Machina	Regret		
2019	Dragon Ball FighterZ	Cheelai		
2019–present	Sonic the Hedgehog series	Blaze the Cat, Omochao	Replaced Laura Bailey	Resume
2020	Granblue Fantasy Versus	Katalina Aryze, War Mecha Katapillar		
2020	Dragon Ball Legends	Cheelai		
2020	Persona 5 Royal	Futaba Sakura		
2020	XCOM: Chimera Squad	Torque		
2020	Fortnite Battle Royale	Skye	Role was done entirely in gibberish	
2020	Final Fantasy VII Remake	Jessie Rasberry		
2020	Desperados III	Kate O'Hara		
2020	Tell Me Why	Alyson Ronan		
2020	Serious Sam 4	Hellfire		
2020	The Legend of Heroes: Trails of Cold Steel IV	Vita Clotilde, Ennea		
2020	Yakuza: Like a Dragon	Additional voices		
2020	Cyberpunk 2077	Misty Olszewski, Meredith Stout, Spider Murphy		
2020	The Last of Us Part II	WLF Soldier		
2021	Persona 5 Strikers	Futaba Sakura		
2021	Akiba's Trip: Hellbound & Debriefed	Rui Fumizuki		
2021	Tales of Arise	Shionne Imeris		
2021	Lost Judgment	Yoko Sawa		
2021	Demon Slayer: Kimetsu no Yaiba – The Hinokami Chronicles	Spider Demon (Elder Sister)		
2021	WarioWare: Get It Together!	Ashley		
2021	Shin Megami Tensei V	Sahori Itsukishima		
2022	Rune Factory 5	Lucy		
2022	Tiny Tina's Wonderlands	Gruff A		
2022	Phantom Breaker: Omnia	Itsuki Kono		
2022	Saints Row	Player Voice 2		
2022	Soul Hackers 2	Milady		
2022	Star Ocean: The Divine Force	Elena		
2022	Fortnite Battle Royale	AMIE	Ongoing role as new content is added	
2022	God of War Ragnarök	Hrist		
2022	Marvel's Midnight Suns	Carol Danvers / Captain Marvel		
2023	Fire Emblem Engage	Celica		
2023	Hi-Fi Rush	Peppermint		
2023	Arknights	Ines, Silence		
2023	Omega Strikers	Vyce		
2023	The Legend of Heroes: Trails into Reverie	Vita Clotilde		
2023	Silent Hope	Fighter		
2023	Marvel's Spider-Man 2	Felicia Hardy / Black Cat		
2023	Persona 5 Tactica	Futaba Sakura		
2023	Granblue Fantasy Versus: Rising	Katalina, War Mecha Katapillar		
2023	Genshin Impact	Chevreuse		
2024	Like a Dragon: Infinite Wealth	Additional voices		
2024	Granblue Fantasy: Relink	Katalina		
2024	Persona 3 Reload	Additional voices		
2024	Helldivers 2	Helldiver Voice 1		
2024	Final Fantasy VII Rebirth	Jessie Rasberry		
2024	Puyo Puyo Puzzle Pop	Raffina		
2024	Demon Slayer: Kimetsu no Yaiba – Sweep the Board	Daki		
2024	Shin Megami Tensei V: Vengeance	Sahori Itsukishima, Amabie		
2025	Like a Dragon: Pirate Yakuza in Hawaii	Additional voices		
2025	Xenoblade Chronicles X: Definitive Edition	Liesel		
2025	Monster Prom 4: Monster Con	April First		
2025	Rune Factory: Guardians of Azuma	Azumato no Mihoshi Habaki, additional voices		
2025	Yakuza 0 Director's Cut	Additional voices		
2025	Shadowverse: Worlds Beyond	Ferocious Flame		
2025	Date Everything!	Dolly		
2025	Demon Slayer: Kimetsu no Yaiba – The Hinokami Chronicles 2	Daki		
2025	The Outer Worlds 2	Augustine de Vries		
2025	Call of Duty: Black Ops 7	Nora Anderson		
2025	My Hero Ultra Rumble	Kaina Tsutsumi / Lady Nagant		
2026	My Hero Academia: All's Justice	Kaina Tsutsumi / Lady Nagant		
2026	Yakuza Kiwami 3 & Dark Ties	Additional voices		
2026	Marathon	Vandal		
2026	People of Note	Annette		
2026	Marvel Rivals	Felicia Hardy / Black Cat		
2026	Zenless Zone Zero	Sunbringer		
2026	Castlevania: Belmont's Curse	Joan of Arc		
TBA	Deadlock	Lilah Silver		

=== Web ===
Year	Title	Role	Notes	Source
2022	Exandria Unlimited: Kymal	Morrighan Ferus	Main role; 2 episodes	
2024–25	Critical Role (campaign three)	Morrighan Ferus	Guest role; 3 episodes	
2026–present	Gameoverse	Kit	Main role; 1 episode	
