= Morgana Ignis =

American actress (born 1989)

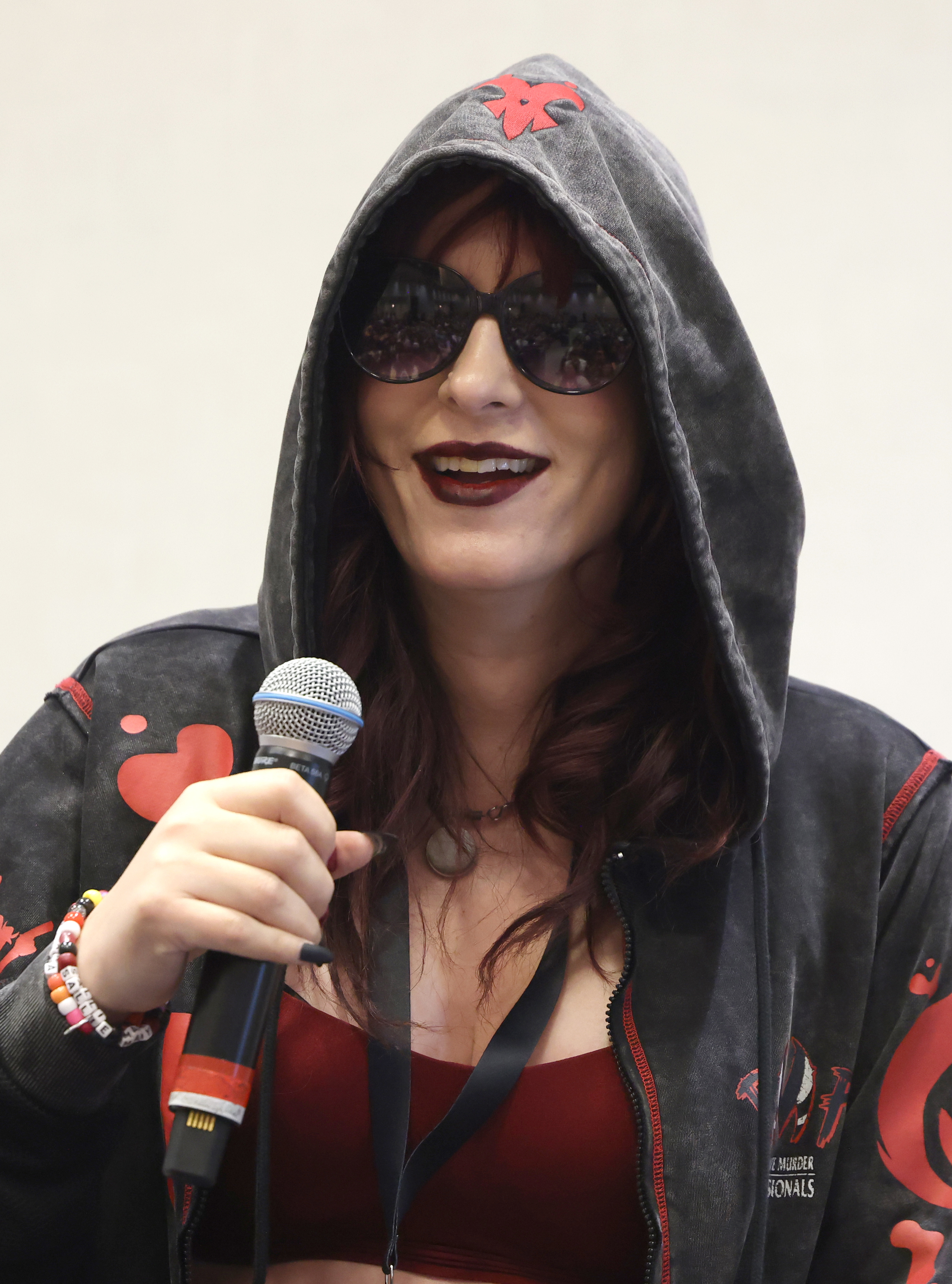
- Ignis in 2025
- Born: May 19, 1989 (age 37); Northridge, Los Angeles, California, U.S.
- Occupations: Actor; writer; puppeteer
- Years active: 2010-present
- Known for: Dracula's Ex-Girlfriend; Stan Against Evil; Helluva Boss; Class Acts

Morgana Gwendolyn Ignis (born May 19, 1989) is an American actress, writer, and puppeteer. She starred as Claire Atlas in the webseries Class Acts, as Fay in Dracula's Ex-Girlfriend, and voices Sallie May on the animated series Helluva Boss.

== Early life ==
Morgana Gwendolyn Ignis was born on May 19, 1989. Ignis grew up in Los Angeles, California. Throughout her teen years, she spent her time working in her father's music studio. assisting at comic book shops, helping host and promote underground art shows and punk clubs, and touring the country performing characters on stage and selling merchandise for the band Stolen Babies. Ignis eventually pursued her acting ambitions further through improv and theater workshops.

== Career ==
Ignis worked as a stop motion animator in shows like Robot Chicken and Moral Orel before studying acting and movement, which led to a career playing creatures and other inhuman characters in sci-fi and horror films, as well a professional cosplayer in conventions.

She starred as Severus Snape in the 2016 short fan film Severus Snape and the Marauders. She is also known for her work on the comedy horror show Stan Against Evil, where she plays multiple recurring characters.

Ignis began working at The Jim Henson Company after Kirk Thatcher brought her as the body performer in The Curious Creations of Christine McConnell for the werewolf Edgar and later on the Disney Plus series Earth to Ned co-puppeteering Ned. She came out professionally as trans fem during the production of Earth to Ned.

In January 2026, Ignis announced that she had joined Glitch Productions as Global Brand Manager.

=== Helluva Boss and collaboration with Brandon Rogers ===
Starting in 2021 Ignis voiced the character Sallie May on the animated YouTube series Helluva Boss, while also being consulted on the character's transgender representation by the production team. Ignis explained that the character of Sallie May is one of her favorite characters she's ever played. She said that the development of Sallie May's appearance, relationship with her sister Millie and particularly the writing and storyline of the Ignis written short, Hell's Belles, is an authentic and meaningful form of representation for her own life as a trans woman.

She befriended Brandon Rogers through her work on Helluva Boss and they began working together on-camera for his Streamy Award Winning series Bryce, where Morgana played the character Florence. From there she worked with him on the choose your own adventure series You Broke the News and then co-starred in the series Class Acts as Claire Atlas.

She was the Head of Merchandise and Licensing for SpindleHorse Toons.

Ignis co-stars in Abigail Thorn's short film Dracula's Ex-Girlfriend along with Brandon Rogers, who also stars in Helluva Boss.

== Personal life ==
Ignis is a trans woman and lesbian. She came out as trans fem in 2009 and presented fluidly in her career until coming out professionally during the production of Earth to Ned.

== Filmography ==
=== Film ===
| Year | Title | Role | Notes / Ref |
|---|---|---|---|
| 2015 | Harbinger Down | Tardigrade | Supporting role |
| 2016 | Severus Snape and the Marauders | Severus Snape | Lead role |
| 2017 | The Sandman | Sandman | Supporting role |
| 2018 | Cucuy: The Boogeyman | The Cucuy | Supporting role |
| 2022 | Moon Garden | Teeth | Supporting role |
| 2022 | Satanic Hispanics | King Zombie (segment “The Hammer of Zanzibar”) | Supporting role |
| 2024 | Dracula's Ex-Girlfriend | Fay | Lead role |
| 2025 | Dandadan: Evil Eye | Naki Kito | Voice; English dub |

=== Television ===
| Year | Title | Role | Notes / Ref |
|---|---|---|---|
| 2016-2018 | Stan Against Evil | Stella Stanas | Recurring Guest Star |
| 2016-2018 | Stan Against Evil | The Baphomet | Recurring Guest Star |
| 2016-2018 | Stan Against Evil | Ida Putnam | Recurring Guest Star |
| 2016-2018 | Stan Against Evil | Haurus | Recurring Guest Star |
| 2016-2018 | Stan Against Evil | Aged Priscilla | Recurring Guest Star |
| 2016-2018 | Stan Against Evil | Shriveled Corpse | Recurring Guest Star |
| 2016-2018 | Stan Against Evil | Vampire Girl in Red | Recurring Guest Star |
| 2018 | The Curious Creations of Christine McConnell | Edgar | Body performance |
| 2020-2021 | Earth to Ned | Ned | Puppeteer |
| 2021–present | Helluva Boss | Catfish monster | Voice; Co-writer for "Helluva Shorts 1: Hell's Belles" |
| 2021–present | Helluva Boss | Sallie May | Voice; Co-writer for "Helluva Shorts 1: Hell's Belles" |
| 2022 | Obi-Wan Kenobi | Unnamed long-necked alien | Puppeteer |
| 2023 | BRYCE | Florence | Supporting Cast |
| 2023 | You Broke the News | Madame Marene | Supporting Cast |
| 2024 | The Seven Deadly Sins: Four Knights of the Apocalypse | Darak | Voice; English dub |
| 2024 | Class Acts | Claire Atlas | Ensemble Cast |
| 2025 | Dandadan | Naki Kito | Voice; English dub |
| 2025 | Amy’s Dead-End Dreamhouse | Quak the Snake | |
| 2026 | Kill Blue | Mama | Voice; English dub |
