= List of animated series with LGBTQ characters: 2000–2004 =

The number of animated series with LGBTQ characters increased from the previous decade. From 2000 to 2004, such characters appeared prominently in Queer Duck, Drawn Together, and The Venture Bros. all of which were Western animations. However, they appeared more frequently in anime series such as Gravitation, Kino's Journey, Kannazuki no Miko, and My-HiME. The shows airing during this period set the stage for those to come in 2005 to 2009, the latter part of the decade.

This list only includes recurring characters, otherwise known as supporting characters, which appear frequently from time to time during the series' run, often playing major roles in more than one episode, and those in the main cast are listed below. LGBTQ characters which are guest stars or one-off characters are listed on the pages focusing exclusively on gay, lesbian, non-binary, and bisexual animated characters, and on pages listing fictional trans, pansexual, asexual, and intersex characters.

The entries on this page are organized alphanumerically by duration dates and then alphabetically by the first letter of a specific series.

== 2000 ==
Duration	Show title	Character debut date	Characters	Identity	Notes	Country
2000	Descendants of Darkness	October 2, 2000	Asato Tsuzuki	Gay	He is a god of death, who works at the Summons Department, and is Hisoka's partner. He begins to fall in love with Hisoka, and Hisoka with him, from the first episode of the series.	Japan
2000	Descendants of Darkness	October 2, 2000	Hisoka Kurosaki	Bisexual	Also a god, but with strong psychic abilities, he partners up with Asato, who didn't want anyone to be his partner. Other than his love for Asato, Hisoka showed some level of feelings for a girl named Tsubaki Kakyouin.	Japan
2000–2001	Gravitation	October 4, 2000	Shuichi Shindo	Gay	A vocalist, he has a chance encounter with Eiri Yuki early in the series. He falls in love with Eiri Yuki beginning in the first episode and over the course of the series manages to melt the cold heart of Eiri, with the two becoming a couple.	Japan
2000–2001	Gravitation	October 4, 2000	Eiri Yuki	Bisexual	A man with a mysterious past, he is a romance novelist whose book is "popular with female fans," but becomes interested in Shuichi. In one episode, "Winding Road," it is revealed that he has a fiancée named Ayaka Usami, but she backs away after seeing how much he loves Shuichi.	Japan
2000–2002	Gotham Girls	2002	Selma Reesedale	Trans woman	Selma Reesedale works for the Gotham City Police Department. She is revealed to be a transgender woman, which Batgirl discovers, and she later helps Batgirl. Batgirl is one of the only characters who knows Selma's secret. She is possibly the first trans sci-fi character to appear in any "superhero production".	United States
2000–2003	X-Men: Evolution	November 4, 2000	Mystique	Bisexual	Character designer and show director Steven E. Gordon confirmed Mystique and Destiny were lovers similar to the comics. Mystique and Destiny are both known for being in a long-time same-sex relationship in the comics. They are also attracted to both men and women.	United States
2000–2003	X-Men: Evolution	November 18, 2000	Destiny	Bisexual	Character designer and show director Steven E. Gordon confirmed Mystique and Destiny were lovers similar to the comics. Mystique and Destiny are both known for being in a long-time same-sex relationship in the comics. They are also attracted to both men and women.	United States
2000–2004	Inuyasha	February 24, 2003	Jakotsu	Gay	Jakotsu is a member of the Jakotsutō, a criminal band of seven assassins. He is shown as being flamboyant, playful, and narcissistic, even liking Inuyasha, pursuing him as prey. He also has a strong preference for men, complimenting Koga's loin cloth and Sesshomaru's appearance, and flirting with Miroku.	Japan
2000–2004	Queer Duck	October 11, 2000	Adam Seymour Duckstein	Gay	Adam is the main character of the series. He is presented as a stereotypical gay duck and has been a victim of gay bashing. However, in the series finale, he wakes up to discover that he had sex with a woman. Queer Duck is voiced by gay actor and comedian Jim J. Bullock.	United States
2000–2004	Queer Duck	October 11, 2000	Steven Arlo Gator	Gay	Steven is Queer Duck's significant other. He is shy and insecure and is usually the voice of reason whenever Queer Duck gets himself or anyone else in trouble. He marries Queer Duck in a Jewish wedding in Vermont in one episode, "Wedding Bell Blues," (although they are often seen as having an open relationship); a moose was the rabbi.	United States
2000–2004	Queer Duck	April 24, 2002	Melissa Duckstein	Lesbian	Melissa is Adam's sister. She is occasionally revealed to be lesbian throughout the series, in a relationship with Yvette, in episodes such as "Homo for the Holidays," and the movie.	United States
2000–2004	Static Shock	September 23, 2000	Richie Foley / Gear	Gay	Best friend of Virgil Hawkins / Static, Richie is based on Rick Stone, an openly gay character from the Static comic book. Dwayne McDuffie, who developed the series and created the Static character, said he dealt with the homosexuality of Richie by writing him "aggressively and unconvincingly announcing his heterosexuality whenever possible...while Virgil rolled his eyes at the transparency of it" but it never came up in the show because it was rated TV-Y7-FV.	United States
2000–2007	Harvey Birdman, Attorney at Law	December 30, 2000	Harvey Birdman	Bisexual	Harvey Birdman has shown attraction to men and women. He had a same-sex relationship with Boo-Boo Bear and married him in the season 3 episode "Return of Birdgirl".	United States
2000–2007	Harvey Birdman, Attorney at Law	December 30, 2000	Dr. Benton Quest	Gay	Dr. Benton Quest and Race Bannon are portrayed as a same-sex couple in the series. The first episode "Bannon Custody Battle" is about Race wanting to share custody of Jonny and Hadji with Benton, though it is revealed in court that Race Bannon is a robot duplicate created by Dr. Zin and the real Race was on vacation. The season 3 episode "Return of Birdgirl" deals with same-sex marriage as Benton and Race want to get legally married.	United States
2000–2007	Harvey Birdman, Attorney at Law	December 30, 2000	Race Bannon	Gay	Dr. Benton Quest and Race Bannon are portrayed as a same-sex couple in the series. The first episode "Bannon Custody Battle" is about Race wanting to share custody of Jonny and Hadji with Benton, though it is revealed in court that Race Bannon is a robot duplicate created by Dr. Zin and the real Race was on vacation. The season 3 episode "Return of Birdgirl" deals with same-sex marriage as Benton and Race want to get legally married.	United States
2000–2007	Harvey Birdman, Attorney at Law	July 14, 2002	Boo-Boo Bear	Gay	Boo-Boo Bear is portrayed as Harvey's gay lover in the series.	United States

== 2001 ==
Duration	Show title	Character debut date	Characters	Identity	Notes	Country
2001	Fruits Basket	September 6, 2001	Hatsuharu Sohma	Bisexual	Hatsuharu is part of the Sohma family, a family cursed into turning into members of the zodiac when under stress or hugged by members of the opposite sex. He was born in the year of the cow and was often annoyed by people's comments about the stupidity of the cow from the zodiac, and blamed his troubles on Yuki who was born the year of the rat. However, Yuki helps him realize he needs to move past people's comments and enters an on/off relationship with Rin Sohma, who dumped him in Season 2, he refers to Yuki as his first love.	Japan
2001	Puni Puni Poemy	March 7, 2001	Futaba Aasu	Lesbian	Poemy's classmate and best friend, and she is madly in love with her, a fact to which Poemy is oblivious. In the final confrontation with the invading aliens, in the second episode, Futaba combines her power with Poemy's, and since Poemy is a representation of Earth, this act pacifies the planet's population, resulting in peace with the aliens. After this event, director Nabeshin casually mentions that Futaba is in reality the main character of the show. Her name comes from futa, the Japanese word for "two". Futaba is mostly a parody of Tomoyo Daidouji, the best friend of magical girl Sakura Kinomoto from Cardcaptor Sakura who is also a lesbian. Unlike Tomoyo, however, Futaba displays more extreme fantasies and lesbian arousal whenever she is with her friend, who she seriously loves.	Japan
2001	Zoids: New Century	January 20, 2001	Benjamin	Gay	Benjamin and Sebastian are Harry Champ's robots. They are the only other members of the Champ Team. Both of the robots are indicated to be gay in the Japanese version. In the episode "My Love, the Judge", Benjamin is shown to be in love with a male Judge Robot. This was censored in the English dub as the Judge Robot was changed to a female Judge. In the Japanese version of "In Search of the Ultimate X", both Benjamin and Sebastian were wearing bikinis and rubbing each other. Those scenes were cut in the English dub.	Japan
2001	Zoids: New Century	January 20, 2001	Sebastian	Gay		Japan
2001–2002	John Callahan's Quads!	February 2, 2001	Spalding	Gay	Spalding is Reilly's Australian physical therapist. He is a drama queen and openly gay. The last two episodes of season 1, "Fatal Distraction" and "Spalding in the Family Way" centered on Spalding as he tries to get back together with his former boyfriend Bruce and coming out to his family.	Canada
2001–2002	John Callahan's Quads!	February 2, 2001	Spalding	Gay	Spalding is Reilly's Australian physical therapist. He is a drama queen and openly gay. The last two episodes of season 1, "Fatal Distraction" and "Spalding in the Family Way" centered on Spalding as he tries to get back together with his former boyfriend Bruce and coming out to his family.	Australia
2001–2002	The Oblongs	April 2, 2001	Biff Oblong	Gay	Biff Oblong was indicated to be gay when he showed attraction to a male coach. He was confirmed to be gay in a bonus feature from The Oblongs Complete Series DVD.	United States
2001–2002	The Oblongs	April 2, 2001	Anita Bidet	Trans woman	Anita Bidet is the owner of the bar Rusty Bucket and Pickles Oblong's friend. She is a pre-op transgender woman who is saving up money for gender reassignment surgery. The series creator called her a "drag queen".	United States
2001–2002	X	August 25, 2001	Subaru Sumeragi	Gay	Subaru tries to hunt and kill Seishirō for killing his sister and when he succeeds, he states he has killed the one he loves most. Their past is elaborated in the manga, Tokyo Babylon, where it was shown Seishirō would often flirt with and tried to seduce Subaru as part of a bet: if Subaru could make him fall in love with him, he wouldn't kill him. While Subaru did grow to love Seishirō, Seishirō couldn't reciprocate but killed Subaru's sister Hotaru in his stead per her request, and as Seishirō dies, he confesses "I also.". before dying.	Japan
2001–2002	X	October 3, 2001	Seishirō Sakurazuka	Gay		Japan
2001–2003	Time Squad	June 8, 2001	Larry 3000	Gay	Larry 3000's voice actor, Mark Hamill, implied that Larry could easily have been interpreted as gay in the cartoon, due to his femininity and presentation as the "gay best friend" to Cleopatra in "Shop like an Egyptian", although Larry has stated on multiple occasions he dislikes humans in general. However, this show never stated his sexuality, although Hamill described Larry as fierce and flamboyant.	United States
2001–2004	Braceface	September 27, 2002	Mark "Dion" Jones	Gay	Canon gay male character as shown in the episode "Game, Set-up and Match". Sharon even tried to set Dion up for a date but it didn't work out. The show's official website called him "sweet, flamboyant and funny".	Canada

== 2002 ==
Duration	Show title	Character debut date	Characters	Identity	Notes	Country
2002	Azumanga Daioh	May 13, 2002	Kaorin	Lesbian	Kaorin has unrequited love for the athletic girl, Sakaki, described as totally idolizing her, and is horrified that Mr. Kimura likes her. Osaka specifically asks Kaori if she is homosexual, Kaori becomes embarrassed and then answers that it's "one of those things peculiar to puberty" and that she'd love Sakaki if say, she 'were' male or whatever, because she's cool. In another translation, she yells "the current term is lesbian!" before denying she is a lesbian. (Note: In Azumanga Daioh: Supplementary Lessons Chapter 3 Page 12, Osaka asks Kaorin whether she is gay, to which she responds "The correct term is Lesbian!" before denying that she is a lesbian.) Others say the show makes her "overtly gay".	Japan
2002	.hack//Sign	April 4, 2002	An Shoji (Tsukasa)	Lesbian	She plays as a male character online due to the mental and physical abuse she suffers from her father, as she hoped that by playing as a male avatar she could distance herself from real life. As Tsukasa (her male avatar), she meets and falls in love with Subaru, the avatar of Mariko Misono, indicated in episodes like "Encounter". The two girls later make plans to meet in real life in the episode "Net Slum".	Japan
2002	.hack//Sign	April 4, 2002	Mariko Misono (Subaru)	Lesbian	Subaru falls in love with An Shoji (Tsukasa), and both girls later make plans to meet in real life in the episode "Net Slum".	Japan
2002	Mirage of Blaze	January 7, 2002	Takaya Ougi	Gay	He is a high school student in Matsumoto, and the reincarnation of Kagetora Uesugi. Kagetora was raped by his vassals and pages and so he and his reincarnation Takaya are androphobic and hate men, but Takaya begins to fall in love with Yoshiaki/Naoe, who is persistent in his advances.	Japan
2002	Mirage of Blaze	January 7, 2002	Yoshiaki Tachibana	Gay	He is the reincarnation of Nobutsuna Naoe.	Japan
2002–2003	Cheeky Angel	June 4, 2002	Megumi Amatsuka	Trans woman	Megumi is a physically attractive trans woman who retains her masculine mannerisms and fighting abilities, which she uses very often, attracting the 'Megu-chan Protection Club', a group of misfit admirers. Nobody else knows she used to be a boy but was transformed into a girl. Initially, only Megumi's best friend, Miki, knew her secret, however the protection club quickly finds out.	Japan
2002–2024	Clone High	November 2, 2002	Wally	Gay	Wally and Carl are JFK's adoptive fathers. They are an interracial couple and JFK refers to them as his "gay foster dads".	United States
2002–2024	Clone High	November 2, 2002	Carl	Gay	Wally and Carl are JFK's adoptive fathers. They are an interracial couple and JFK refers to them as his "gay foster dads".	Canada
2002–2024	Clone High	May 23, 2023	Frida Kahlo	Queer	Frida Kahlo is the clone of Mexican painter Frida Kahlo. Frida is revealed to be queer in the episode "Sexy-Ed" when she confesses her love to Cleopatra. The historical Frida Kahlo was bisexual. Frida is voiced by lesbian singer-songwriter and actress Vicci Martinez.	Canada
2002-2005	Ghost in the Shell: Stand Alone Complex	October 1, 2002	Motoko Kusanagi	Bisexual	Motoko Kusanagi has engaged in relationships with both men and women throughout the series. Kusanagi is canonically bisexual in the manga.	Japan

== 2003 ==
Duration	Show title	Character debut date	Characters	Identity	Notes	Country
2003	Air Master	April 1, 2003	Mina Nakanotani	Lesbian	Mina is hopelessly in love with Maki after meeting her in the first episode. Although she constantly denies this, she kisses Maki in the show's third episode, and later takes her to a "love hotel". In the manga this anime is based on, Mina also develops a crush on Maki.	Japan
2003	Kino's Journey	April 8, 2003	Kino	Transmasculine	Kino is a traveler who goes to "unknown mystical places" with a talking motorcycle named Hermes. Kino was assigned female at birth, but has a "androgynous persona," alternating between using feminine and masculine pronouns, while resisting those that attempt to pin a gender on them as a "girl" or "boy". While the show's official website, described Kino as a "young man," the series creator, Keiichi Sigsawa, said in September 2017, "Kino really doesn't think of herself too deeply when she uses pronouns. Depending on the circumstances, she may use "boku" or "atashi", it kinda depends on the situation she finds herself in," adding that it was not he "wanted to write a story about a girl who lives like a boy directly, [but] it was just an interesting way to start the story, and her character's personality has continued that way since then".	Japan
2003	Yami to Bōshi to Hon no Tabibito	October 2, 2003	Hazuki Azuma	Lesbian	She is a tomboyish female with numerous female admirers, throughout her journeys, who develops a sexual attraction to her adopted older sister, Hatsumi Azuma, who reciprocates. After Hatsumi disappears on her 16th birthday, Hazuki goes world-hopping in hopes of finding Hazuki, which her companions, a bird, and a woman named Lilith, known by the name of "Eve". Her love is deep-rooted, seemingly reciprocated through love letters from Hatsumi while she lived in Japan, and encounters a woman named Fujihime in a feudal Japanese world whom looks almost identical to Hatsumi. In the final episode, "Lilith," they kiss each other, fulfilling Hazuki's wish.	Japan
2003	Yami to Bōshi to Hon no Tabibito	October 2, 2003	Hatsumi Azuma	Lesbian	The adopted older sister of Hazuki Azuma, she develops an attraction to her, and kisses her in the show's final episode.	Japan
2003	Yami to Bōshi to Hon no Tabibito	October 2, 2003	Lilith	Possibly bisexual	Lilith, the guardian of the Great Library, who has taken on the title "Yami," flirts relentlessly with Hazuki. Sometimes she goes to absurd lengths to show her love in various book worlds, sometimes even trying to sleep with her, as shown in episodes such as "Quill" and "Layla". Lilith's previous lover was the library's previous protector, Adam, referred to as a male character in the third episode. While Lilith is close to her sister, Hitsumi, whose real name is Eve, she only loves her in a platonic way.	Japan
2003–2004	Fullmetal Alchemist	October 11, 2003	Envy	Genderqueer	Envy is a shapeshifting homunculus without a specific gender. While they are usually referred to in general neutral pronouns in the Japanese version, in both anime they are usually referred to as he, indicate in episodes like "Death". They are normally seen to have the appearance of an 'androgynous' female.	Japan
2003–2020	Red vs. Blue	October 2, 2016	Agent Ohio "Vera"	Lesbian	Agent Ohio is a lesbian woman and an agent of Project Freelancer who appeared in two episodes of Season 14, specifically "The Triplets" and "The "Mission"". Her sexuality was confirmed by the episode's writer, Shannon McCormick.	United States
2003–2020	Red vs. Blue	October 9, 2016	Sherry	Lesbian	Sherry is a lesbian woman and a soldier for Charon Industries who appeared in one episode of Season 14, "The Mission". Her sexuality was confirmed by the episode's writer, Shannon McCormick in the same string of tweets where he said Vera was lesbian.	United States
2003–present	Eddsworld	September 18, 2005	Kim	Bisexual	Tord, one of the show's protagonists, thinks Kim is interested in him, but she isn't, and only is messing and flirting with him. Instead she kisses her girlfriend, Katya, to his chagrin, in the episode "The Dudette Next Door".	United Kingdom
2003–present	Eddsworld	September 18, 2005	Katya	Lesbian	She has a girlfriend, Kim, who she loves very much, kissing her intensely in one episode. Like Kim, she is voiced by Kira Buckland.	United Kingdom

== 2004 ==
Duration	Show title	Character debut date	Characters	Identity	Notes	Country
2004	Burst Angel	April 6, 2004	Megumi "Meg"	Lesbian	She is the very best of friends with Jo and is 100% loyal only to her. Since Meg was once an orphan in New York City, Meg and Jo partnered and became bounty hunters together. While the anime tries to keep her relationship with Jo on the verge of friendly affection and still maintain a few subtle subtext, the three-volume manga prequel openly shows that Meg is experiencing a sexual attraction to her friend, fantasizing about their sex or even openly trying to seduce Jo. This is later referenced in the OVA sequel, "Jo and Meg Blues".	Japan
2004	Doki Doki School Hours	April 4, 2004	Rio Kitagawa	Lesbian	She is a lesbian and has stated on several occasions that she loves small girls, thus making it no surprise that she has a huge (and slightly sadistic) crush on Mika-sensei. She is constantly flirting with her, which often borders on molestation. She also does well academically, though she may fail the test on purpose if it means she will get to spend time with Mika-sensei.	Japan
2004	Doki Doki School Hours	April 4, 2004	Yuichi Kudo	Gay	A male honor student who is gay and in love with Suetake, clear from the show's first episode. Though Suetake is completely oblivious to Kudo's affections, everyone else is aware of them, and they are constantly rolling their eyes over his actions (which is very similar to how they react to Kitagawa's love for Mika, the only difference being that Mika is aware of Kitagawa's feelings, but can do little to stop her advances). He is seen having fantasies about Suetake, and not much else.	Japan
2004	Kannazuki no Miko	October 1, 2004	Himeko Kurusugawa	Bisexual	At first, Himeko is romantically interested in her childhood friend Sōma Ōgami. During the last few episodes of the series, Himeko realizes and accepts her feelings for Chikane, with Himeko reunited with Chikane. In the show's final episode, they kiss after admitting their feelings for each other and are reunited even after they are reincarnated after the defeat of the Orochi.	Japan
2004	Kannazuki no Miko	October 1, 2004	Chikane Himemiya	Lesbian	Chikane has loved Himeko since they met, although (despite her jealousy of Himeko and Sōma's friendship) she does not admit it until much later, with Chikane's feelings for Himeko bordering on obsession. She eventually turns evil upon joining the Orochi as the Eighth Head, vanquishing all but two of the Orochi heads, sexually assaulting Himeko in the 8th episode, and tormenting her during their final battle.	Japan
2004	Kannazuki no Miko	October 1, 2004	Otoha Kisaragi	Lesbian	Devoted maid to Chikane, makes clear that Chikane reserved her feelings only for Himeko and is, as such, jealous of Himeko. When Otoha is sent away, in the episode "Rainfall in the Hell of Love," she expresses her love and admiration for Chikane.	Japan
2004	Re: Cutie Honey	July 24, 2004	Cutie Honey	Lesbian	Inspector Natsuko Aki grows close to Cutie Honey, otherwise known as Honey Kisaragi, apologizing for calling her a "nuisance" and bringing her back to life by lying naked with her, allowing their hearts to connect, returning her energy in the episode "Earth's Volume". In the final episode, "Humanity's Volume," Natsuko cares for Cutie after a fight with a guardian of the Panther Claw. After she gives Cutie a pep talk, raising her spirits, Cutie embraces her, saying she "loves" her, and they have a tender moment before beginning the major battle. At the close of the episode, Cutie and Natsuko work together in a detective agency, fighting evildoers.	Japan
2004	Re: Cutie Honey	July 24, 2004	Natsuko Aki	Lesbian		Japan
2004–2005	Gankutsuou: The Count of Monte Cristo	October 5, 2004	Franz d'Épinay	Bisexual	Franz, a friend of Albert and "strong subordinate", is engaged to a woman named Valentine for political reasons though he does not love her. He instead heavily implies throughout the series that he has strong feelings for someone else and it is later revealed his feelings are towards his best friend Albert, who is traveling with him. However, he did show some attraction to women and did consider sleeping with a woman in episode 1, "At Journey's End, We Meet".	Japan
2004–2005	My-HiME	September 30, 2004	Natsuki Kuga	Lesbian	In the carnival, it was revealed that Shizuru is Natsuki's most important person but because of Shizuru's psychotic rampage Natsuki began to doubt her feelings, as before that time, their love was only implied. Natsuki also loves Shizuru back. Kuga's voice actress Saeko Chiba said that by the end of the series she had "opened her heart more and more...[and] accepted people properly without knowing it".	Japan
2004–2005	My-HiME	September 30, 2004	Shizuru Fujino	Lesbian	She harbors a secret obsessive infatuation with Natsuki Kuga and they remove themselves from the tournament by killing each other, but are resurrected in the final episode. Natsuki accepts Shizuru's feelings after giving Takeda a letter explaining her rejection. The voice actress for Fujino, Naomi Shindo wondered if the audience could sympathize with the character, calling her an "unpleasant woman," and wondered how the feelings in the character's heart would change people.	Japan
2004–2006	Kyo Kara Maoh!	April 3, 2004	Wolfram von Bielefeld	Gay	In another dimension called Shin Makoku, love between the same gender is not rare at all. Wolfram became Shibuya Yuuri's accidental fiancé after Yuuri slaps him on his left cheek for insulting his mother which actually is a traditional proposal among the nobles in Shin Makoku.	Japan
2004–2006	W.I.T.C.H.	December 18, 2004	Irma	Possibly lesbian	In April 2016, Greg Weisman, the producer of Season 2, said that she is a lesbian, only interested in "guys that are obviously out of reach," trying to be straight, but by doing this, she is "guaranteeing that she won't have to actually wind up with a guy" and when she comes close, she "comes close to landing one of them, she bolts". Even so, he left it open to interpretation, saying that this doesn't make it "impossible for her to be straight or bisexual or whatever".	United States
2004–2006	W.I.T.C.H.	February 12, 2005	Nerissa	Possibly lesbian	She was a lover of Cassidy, who killed Cassidy when both were in a romantic relationship with one another, according to Weisman. Both also began a relationship, in Weisman's words, after spending a lot of time together as teammates, and said that she "loved and mourned Cassidy". Even so, Weisman did not correct a fan when they described Nerissa as bisexual.	United States
2004–2006	W.I.T.C.H.	August 21, 2006	Cassidy	Lesbian	Weisman described Cassidy as a lesbian, said that Cassidy and Nerissa were lovers, and told a fan that they were in a relationship when Nerissa killed Cassidy.	United States
2004–2007	Drawn Together	October 27, 2004	Ling-Ling	Bisexual	Ling-Ling, an Asian trading-card mini-monster, is identified as bisexual by a parody of The Terminator in the episode "Wooldoor Sockbat's Giggle-Wiggle Funny Tickle Non-Traditional Progressive Multicultural Roundtable!".	United States
2004–2007	Drawn Together	October 27, 2004	Foxxy Love	Bisexual	Foxxy, a "sexy mystery-solver," has relations with both men and women, but preferably with the former. She makes out with Princess Clara in the show's first episode, and has a brief BDSM relationship with Captain Hero in another episode, "Requiem for a Reality Show".	United States
2004–2007	Drawn Together	October 27, 2004	Xandir P. Whifflebottom	Gay	Xandir is a homosexual and effeminate video game platformer. He is thought to be straight when on a "never-ending quest to save his girlfriend" but is revealed to be gay, as first shown in the episode "Gay Bash" when the Wood Beast, a creature which bites off the arms of homosexuals, bites off his arm. He is also labeled as a "gay video game adventurer" in the first episode. He is a parody of the video game heroes such as Link from The Legend of Zelda series and in another episode, "Xandir and Tim, Sitting in a Tree". Xandir has an affair with Captain Hero's gay alter ego, Tim Tommerson. Xandir is voiced by gay actor Jack Plotnick.	United States
2004–2007	Drawn Together	October 27, 2004	Captain Leslie Hero	Pansexual	Captain Hero, a lecherous parody of Superman and other superheroes, is a "brawny classic cartoon superhero" who is shown to be sexually aroused, due to his erectile dysfunction, by an array of paraphilias like necrophilia and will have sex with anything and anyone. He and Foxxy Love form a brief BDSM relationship in one episode, "Requiem for a Reality Show," and as his gay alter ego Tim Tommerson, has an affair with Xandir in another episode, "Xandir and Tim, Sitting in a Tree".	United States
2004–2009	bro'Town	September 22, 2004	Brother Ken	Fa'afafine	Brother Ken is the principal of the school and is fa'afafine, a person in Samoa, American Samoa and the Samoan diaspora who identifies themselves as having a third gender or non-binary role, and is an integral part of Samoan culture. Those who are fa'afafine have behaviour which ranges from extravagantly feminine to conventionally masculine. Because the concept does not readily translate, when the series was broadcast on Adult Swim Latin America, a decision was made not to translate Samoan words and just present them as part of the "cultural journey".	New Zealand
2004–2009	Maria-sama ga Miteru	January 21, 2004	Suguru Kashiwagi	Gay	In the anime, Kashiwagi, who is student council president of an all-boys school named Hanadera Academy, is said to be engaged to Sachiko Ogasawara, but is not interested in her, drawing her anger. The official site for the series said that Kashiwagi nicknames Yuki Fukuzawa "Yukichi" and says he is "strangely fond of him". In the manga and novels it is confirmed that Kashiwagi is gay because he is interested in Yuki, the brother of Yumi, who is the sœur of Sachiko.	Japan
2004–2009	Maria-sama ga Miteru	January 29, 2007	Kintarou Arisugawa	Trans woman	Also known as Alice, she is enrolled in Hanadera Academy, and her inner female identity is at odds with her male appearance. As such, she is overjoyed at the decision by Sachiko to swap the genders of those students playing in a school play. She later runs for a secretary position on the Student Council of Lillian Girls' Academy, as noted in the light novel.	Japan
2004–2010	6teen	December 21, 2006	Connie	Lesbian	A drummer in Wyatt's band who appears in a few episodes ("Snow Job," "Selling Out To The Burger Man," and "Role Reversal"). She goes with Jean to the Sadie Hawkins Day Dance. (Note: Jean is the third gay character to be featured on the show, she's the only one who's outright stated to be so, with the others being a possibly gay cowboy and Kevin as gay.)	Canada
2004–2018	The Venture Bros.	September 11, 2004	Colonel Horace Gentleman	Gay	According to the creators of the show, Colonel Gentleman was always, openly, and proudly gay. He has an ex-wife, Mz. Quymn, and a former lover, Kiki, shown in the episode "Past Tense," who he lived with at his home in Tangiers, Morocco for years.	United States
2004–2018	The Venture Bros.	September 3, 2006	The Alchemist	Gay	The Alchemist and Shore Leave are in an on-again, off-again relationship, shown in episodes such as "Fallen Arches". According to the show's creators, The Alchemist is gay in a way that is "just incidental" while Shore Leave is a very "openly swishy queer proud guy". They both appeared in The Venture Bros.: Radiant Is the Blood of the Baboon Heart.	United States
2004–2018	The Venture Bros.	June 25, 2008	Shore Leave	Gay	The Alchemist and Shore Leave are in an on-again, off-again relationship, shown in episodes such as "Fallen Arches". According to the show's creators, The Alchemist is gay in a way that is "just incidental" while Shore Leave is a very "openly swishy queer proud guy". They both appeared in The Venture Bros.: Radiant Is the Blood of the Baboon Heart.	United States
2004–present	Peppa Pig	September 15, 2021	Dr. Polar Bear	Lesbian	Dr. Polar Bear and Mummy Polar Bear are the mothers of Penny Polar Bear.	United Kingdom
2004–present	Peppa Pig	November 19, 2021	Mummy Polar Bear	Lesbian	Dr. Polar Bear and Mummy Polar Bear are the mothers of Penny Polar Bear.	United Kingdom

== See also ==
- List of yuri anime and manga
- List of LGBT-related films by year
- List of animated films with LGBT characters
- LGBTQ themes in Western animation
- LGBTQ themes in anime and manga
