= List of animated series with LGBTQ characters: 2005–2009 =

The number of animated series with LGBTQ characters, from 2005 to 2009, changed from those aired from 2000 to 2004, with the addition of various LGBTQ characters in Western animation. In the latter case, this included characters in series such as American Dad!, The Cleveland Show, Superjail!, and Archer. Even so, most of the LGBTQ characters still appeared in anime. Prominently, LGBTQ characters appeared in Kashimashi: Girl Meets Girl, Simoun, Strawberry Panic!, Canaan, Kanamemo, Sweet Blue Flowers, and Whispered Words.

This list only includes recurring characters, otherwise known as supporting characters, which appear frequently from time to time during the series' run, often playing major roles in more than one episode, and those in the main cast are listed below. LGBTQ characters which are guest stars or one-off characters are listed on the pages focusing exclusively on gay, lesbian, non-binary, and bisexual animated characters, and on pages listing fictional trans, pansexual, asexual, and intersex characters.

The entries on this page are organized alphanumerically by duration dates and then alphabetically by the first letter of a specific series.

== 2005 ==
Duration	Show title	Character debut date	Characters	Identity	Notes	Country
2005	Best Student Council	April 20, 2005	Kaori Izumi	Lesbian	She is an assault squad rookie, and in Episode 3, "Payapaya in the Best Dorms," she admits she has a secret crush on Kanade Jinguuji and is jealous of Rino.	Japan
2005	Embracing Love	March 31, 2005	Kyousuke Iwaki	Gay	Iwaki comes from a conservative, traditionalist family while Katou comes from an open and accepting family. Despite this, Katou ultimately wins Iwaki's love, as shown in the first OVA, "Haru wo Daiteita," and shown in the series as a whole.	Japan
2005	Embracing Love	March 31, 2005	Youji Katou	Gay	Iwaki comes from a conservative, traditionalist family while Katou comes from an open and accepting family. Despite this, Katou ultimately wins Iwaki's love, as shown in the first OVA, "Haru wo Daiteita," and shown in the series as a whole.	Japan
2005	Gift	July 2, 2005	Nikey	Queer	Nikey is an anthropomorphic cartoon dog and a parody of Mickey Mouse. In the 22nd episode, Nikey gets into a same-sex relationship with SKLet, a campy gay skeleton. The two stay as a couple for the rest of the series' run.	France
2005	Gift	July 16, 2005	SKLet	Gay	Nikey is an anthropomorphic cartoon dog and a parody of Mickey Mouse. In the 22nd episode, Nikey gets into a same-sex relationship with SKLet, a campy gay skeleton. The two stay as a couple for the rest of the series' run.	France
2005	He Is My Master	April 21, 2005	Anna Kurauchi	Bisexual	She's bisexual, flirty, and constantly tries to do perverted acts with Izumi, who is mostly disgusted by her lesbianism. She was originally attracted to Yoshitaka, but because of Izumi's relentless effort convincing her to stay away from Yoshitaka, she mistook it as sign of interest, thus she fell in love with Izumi and became Yoshitaka's maid to follow Izumi, as shown in the 3rd and 4th episodes.	Japan
2005	Legend of DUO	April 21, 2005	Duo	Gay	Vampire Duo discloses the secret of purana, an essence of living force, to humans so they may be able to survive past extinction as shown in multiple episodes. Duo is punished and his friend Zeig is sent to punish him, as they have an ongoing conversation about the importance of human existence throughout the series. Their relationship is not just platonic friendship and the two show a continuing attraction to each other, with Zeig carrying Duo to a future life in the final episode. Afterwards, the narrator describes Duo and Zeig as vampires "in love."	Japan
2005	Legend of DUO	April 21, 2005	Zeig	Gay		Japan
2005	Loveless	April 6, 2005	Ritsuka Aoyagi	Gay	Soubi, who has an attraction to young boys, often flirts with Ritsuka, much to his discomfort from the show's first episode. The two slowly grow feelings for each other. Writer and poet T.A. Noonan describes their love affair in the manga as falling into "both orthodox heterosexual and subversive homosexual contexts," as Ritsuka treats Soubi as an adult. In an interview with Yun Kōga, she said that while she doesn't consider the manga yaoi, but her fans do.	Japan
2005	Loveless	April 6, 2005	Soubi Agatsuma	Gay	Soubi, who has an attraction to young boys, often flirts with Ritsuka, much to his discomfort from the show's first episode. The two slowly grow feelings for each other. Writer and poet T.A. Noonan describes their love affair in the manga as falling into "both orthodox heterosexual and subversive homosexual contexts," as Ritsuka treats Soubi as an adult. In an interview with Yun Kōga, she said that while she doesn't consider the manga yaoi, but her fans do.	Japan
2005	Paradise Kiss	October 3, 2005	Jōji "George" Koizumi	Bisexual	George is a designer at Parakiss. He is bisexual and sees himself as an "equal opportunity lover", including with the protagonist, Yukari "Caroline" Hayasaka as shown in episodes like "Atlier" and "Future," and Isabella previously had a relationship with Joji.	Japan
2005	Paradise Kiss	October 20, 2005	Isabella Yamamoto	Trans woman	Isabella was assigned male at birth, but lives as a trans woman as revealed in the episode "Rose." Robin Brenner calls the character "one of the most realistic and accepting portrayals of a transgender character in anime," with the same applying to the manga. She acts as a mother figure to the members of ParaKiss and inspired George to make several dresses for Isabella since childhood.	Japan
2005–2006	My-Otome	October 6, 2005	Tomoe Marguerite	Lesbian	She harbors romantic feelings for Shizuru, as shown from the first episode of the series, with Tomoe having a dark side as revealed later in the series.	Japan
2005–2008	Ben 10	February 18, 2006	Rojo	Lesbian	Rojo is a leader of a biker gang. She uses alien tech. Rojo was confirmed to be a lesbian by co-creator Duncan Rouleau on April 20, 2020, and she was in a relationship with fellow gang member Azul. Rojo also appeared in Ben 10: Ultimate Alien and Ben 10: Omniverse.	United States
2005–2011	Fudêncio e Seus Amigos	2005	Conrado Khaki	Pansexual	One of the main characters of the series, his head is a persimmon that people often mistakenly believe to be a tomato. Conrado is hopelessly in love with Zezé Maria who he sees as the "perfect woman." Zezé is either a cross-dresser or a trans girl as shown in the episode "I want to be Cazé Peçanha." Conrado knows about this, but that does not stop him from loving him/her, regardless of whether Zezé Maria is a boy, girl or whatever Zezé identifies as.	Brazil
2005–2011	Fudêncio e Seus Amigos	May 8, 2008	Zezé Maria	Ambiguous	Zezé Maria is one of the students at the school, with his/her name roughly translated into "Joe-Joe Mary". (Note: In Portuguese, "Zezé" is a reduplication of "Zé", a familiar form of "José", which is equivalent to English "Joseph", and "Maria" is equivalent to English "Mary". "Zezé Maria" is a normal masculine name, as it is not unknown for men in Portuguese-speaking countries to be called José Maria or Zé Maria. However, José is a masculine name and Maria is a feminine name, hinting at the character's gender ambiguity. Additionally, in Portuguese, Zezé Maria is referred to by pronouns ele ("he") and ela ("she"), as well as articles o (masculine "the") and a (feminine "the").) Zezé has the appearance of a witty little girl with a manly voice, often referred to using pronouns and articles of either gender, regarded by friends as a 'trans girl.' Zezé is shown to be attracted to men in one episode as shown in the episode "Zezé's Girlfriend." In another episode, "Gay!!," all the students become temporarily gay except Conrado, and Zezé Maria calls herself a lesbian, but Funérea (another girl) rejects her on the grounds that she became a lesbian too and does not think of Zezé as a girl.	Brazil
2005–2014	The Boondocks	December 11, 2005	Gangstalicious	Gay	A supporting character, he is a closeted homosexual and goes to great lengths to keep this secret from the public. He was formerly involved in a secret homosexual affair with a gangster named Lincoln who attempts to kill Gangstalicious for betraying their love while on tour, and at some point assaulted a record label executive and rapped about it on TRL only to be arrested later. He was also involved in a relationship with a hip-hop video vixen named Jessica Ethelberg, who later wrote a book revealing he was gay (despite the fact that there were already countless obvious clues to the fact beforehand) in the episode "The Story of Gangstalicious".	United States
2005–present	American Dad!	February 6, 2005	Roger	Pansexual	Roger is the very zany pansexual alien who lives in the Smith family's attic. Roger is shown to assume different aliases and a carousel of seemingly-endless lives, often outrageously deceiving numerous people. This includes a sweatshop owner, a bastard son of a prostitute and whore, wedding planner Jeannie Gold, news anchor Genevieve Vavance, and Meredith Fields (assuming the life of a socialite of the same name), along with hundreds of other personalities he embodies.	United States
2005–present	American Dad!	May 1, 2005	Greg Corbin	Gay	Greg and Terry had a penchant for minor bickering, flirting, and working on stereotypical "couples' issues" on the set or in other scenes of the show. Greg is a member of the Log Cabin Republicans. He is presented as being very culturally sophisticated, at one point causing Stan to choose him over Francine as his guest to get into Avery Bullock's high-end party. Greg and Terry have a surrogate baby daughter, Liberty Belle. In a 2008 interview, show creator Seth MacFarlane said that he hoped that with these characters the show is "doing a small part to advance progress," and talked about writing funny scenes with both characters. In the season 13 episode "Anchorfran", their relationship came to an end when Terry dumped Greg to follow 311.	United States
2005–present	American Dad!	May 1, 2005	Terry Bates	Gay		United States
2005–present	American Dad!	February 23, 2015	Devin	Lesbian	Devin is a member of a lesbian roller derby team.	United States

== 2006 ==
Duration	Show title	Character debut date	Characters	Identity	Notes	Country
2006	Freak Show	October 4, 2006	Log Cabin Republican	Gay	Log Cabin Republican is a member of The Freak Squad. He is a gay Republican. His superpower is turning into "Burly Bear."	United States
2006	Gakuen Heaven	April 1, 2006	Keita Itō	Gay	Keita gets enrolled into Bell Liberty Academy despite the school being for the best of the best and Keita himself being average in this boy's love anime, based on a manga with similar themes. His first friend is Endo who cares for him and Keita realizes Endo is a childhood friend of his and is the reason why Keita was admitted to Bell Liberty Academy. By the end of the anime, the two realize and confess their feelings for each other, becoming a couple as a result.	Japan
2006	Gakuen Heaven	April 1, 2006	Endō Kazuki	Gay	Keita gets enrolled into Bell Liberty Academy despite the school being for the best of the best and Keita himself being average in this boy's love anime, based on a manga with similar themes. His first friend is Endo who cares for him and Keita realizes Endo is a childhood friend of his and is the reason why Keita was admitted to Bell Liberty Academy. By the end of the anime, the two realize and confess their feelings for each other, becoming a couple as a result.	Japan
2006	Kagihime	January 3, 2006	Kisa Misaki	Lesbian	After battling Arisu (despite not seeming to care about the stories before the battle) and being saved by Kiraha, she agrees to help collect the stories to be closer to Kiraha. Kisa has stockpiled items that have been owned or touched by Kiraha in a cupboard at her house that she collects whenever possible. She also tries to get Kiraha to eat her food; she is seen kissing the food beforehand and/or eating the food after Kiraha has taken a bite as to receive an 'indirect kiss' from her.	Japan
2006	Kashimashi: Girl Meets Girl	January 11, 2006	Hazumu Osaragi	Lesbian trans woman	The series protagonist, Hazumu Osaragi begins the series as a boy. After being rejected by a schoolgirl named Yasuna Kamiizumi, they are inadvertently killed due to an alien spacecraft crash-landing on them, with the alien, Hitoshi Sora, resurrecting Hazumu, but changes their physical sex to female. For the rest of the series, Hazumu adopts to life as a girl, is attracted to two of her childhood friends: Yasuna, and Tomari Kurusu.	Japan
2006	Kashimashi: Girl Meets Girl	January 18, 2006	Tomari Kurusu	Bisexual	Tomari is Hazumu's childhood friend, so the two know a lot about each other and have many memories from the past. After Hazumu's initial transformation, Tomari does not know what to do. Ayuki observes that Tomari liked Hazumu more as a boy, due to the fact that she has had affections for Hazumu for some time. At first, she is very annoyed that everyone around Hazumu is trying to make her more feminine, but ultimately realizes that while Hazumu has changed physically, her personality is still the same, and therefore still the same person inside, as shown "The Girl Realizes That She is a Girl."	Japan
2006	Ouran High School Host Club	June 10, 2006	Ryoji "Ranka" Fujioka	Bisexual	Ryoji is Haruhi Fujioka's father who works as a cross-dressing entertainer. In the series, he expresses undying love for his deceased wife, but often brings home male lovers while Haruhi is at school.	Japan
2006	Simoun	April 4, 2006	Aer	Lesbian	She immediately takes a liking to Neviril, and pushes to become Neviril's new pair after Amuria is lost. She loves Neviril a lot, but she is frustrated when Neviril is thinking of Amuria. In the end of the series, she and Neviril are in the new world, happily dancing together.	Japan
2006	Simoun	April 4, 2006	Alty	Lesbian	She harbors an incestuous crush toward her older sister, Kaim, which causes her sister's hostility to her, as shown in the episode "Sisters." She may also have feelings toward others, such as Floe.	Japan
2006	Simoun	April 4, 2006	Amuria	Lesbian	She and Neviril had been a pair, and romantically partnered, kissing multiple times, ever since Neviril first joined Chor Tempest in the show's first episode. Amuria was lost when she and Neviril attempted the Emerald Ri Mājon (an extremely difficult and powerful Ri Mājon maneuver, which was Amuria's idea to try) in the first combat action against Argentum.	Japan
2006	Simoun	April 4, 2006	Neviril	Lesbian	She was very close to Amuria and she is devastated by the loss of her beloved partner. Even though she keeps being reminded of Amuria, she falls in love with Aer and they march to the new world together.	Japan
2006	Strawberry Panic!	April 3, 2006	Aoi Nagisa	Lesbian	When Aoi transfers to this school, she is smitten with Shizuma Hanazono, the schools' only Etoile. Over the course of series, she and Shizuma grow closer, as she faces a difficult decision.	Japan
2006	Strawberry Panic!	April 3, 2006	Shizuma Hanazono	Lesbian	When Aoi transfers to this school, she is smitten with Shizuma Hanazono, the schools' only Etoile. Over the course of series, she and Shizuma grow closer, as she faces a difficult decision.	Japan
2006	Strawberry Panic!	April 3, 2006	Kaname Kenjō	Lesbian	Kaname is a domineering, forceful, and devious girl who is also on the student council for Spica, who is in a sexual relationship with Momomi Kiyashiki, meaning they are the first explicitly lesbian couple depicted in the series.	Japan
2006	Strawberry Panic!	April 3, 2006	Momomi Kiyashiki	Lesbian	Kaname is a domineering, forceful, and devious girl who is also on the student council for Spica, who is in a sexual relationship with Momomi Kiyashiki, meaning they are the first explicitly lesbian couple depicted in the series.	Japan
2006	Strawberry Panic!	April 3, 2006	Yaya Nanto	Lesbian	Yaya, the roommate of Hikari, has feelings for Hikari and possibly Tsubomi. At the same time, Tsubomi may be in love with Yaya.	Japan
2006	Strawberry Panic!	April 3, 2006	Tsubomi Okuwaka	Lesbian	Yaya, the roommate of Hikari, has feelings for Hikari and possibly Tsubomi. At the same time, Tsubomi may be in love with Yaya.	Japan
2006	Strawberry Panic!	April 3, 2006	Amane Ohtori	Lesbian	Amane, is a local celebrity of Spica, often seen riding a white horse named Star Bright, which makes her seem more like a prince, and has a very masculine appearance, while she has a crush on Hikari, who also has a crush on her, showing her affection much in the way a man does for a woman. Hikari, on the other hand, is a physically weak girl who is fairly easy to be taken advantage of, much to her dismay.	Japan
2006	Strawberry Panic!	April 3, 2006	Hikari Konohana	Lesbian	Amane, is a local celebrity of Spica, often seen riding a white horse named Star Bright, which makes her seem more like a prince, and has a very masculine appearance, while she has a crush on Hikari, who also has a crush on her, showing her affection much in the way a man does for a woman. Hikari, on the other hand, is a physically weak girl who is fairly easy to be taken advantage of, much to her dismay.	Japan
2006	Strawberry Panic!	April 3, 2006	Miyuki Rokujō	Lesbian	Student council president of Miator, she seems to have unrequited feelings for Shizuma, despite the fact she will have a fiancé after she graduates.	Japan
2006	Strawberry Panic!	April 3, 2006	Tamao Suzumi	Lesbian	Some stated that at the end of the anime, she "doomed to lives of loneliness and alcoholism," which is because her love for Nagisa, her roommate, is unrequited. Tamao's crush on Nagisa is what gives her a sense of determination to be around her. She is, also, highly literate as a member of the Literature Club who loves to write poems.	Japan
2006	Tactical Roar	January 7, 2006	Clio Aquanaut	Bisexual	She is the player of the crew and is bisexual, as noted by her voice actress, Rio Natsuki, with many girls after her. She likes to tease and flirt with Hyosuke as well as anyone else and is the Weapons Chief.	Japan
2006	What It's Like Being Alone	June 26, 2006	Charlie	Gay	Charlie is a literally flaming gay boy.	Canada
2006–2007	Code Geass	October 6, 2006	Nina Einstein	Lesbian	She develops a lesbian obsession, and yearning, for the Third Princess of Britannia Euphemia after the latter helps Nina through a traumatizing hostage incident at Lake Kawaguchi Convention. Nina later masturbates to her picture as shown in the episode, "Battle at Kyushu."	Japan
2006–2007	Le Chevalier D'Eon	August 19, 2006	D'eon de Beaumont/Lia de Beaumont	Genderqueer	Lia de Beaumont is killed and her brother D'eon de Beaumont seeks her murderers. Ultimately, her spirit begins to inhabit his body whenever his life is in danger. This character is based on the identity that real-life cross-dresser, Chevalier d'Eon claimed in a 1756 mission to Russia.	Japan
2006–2007	Lizzy the Lezzy	2006	Lizzy	Lesbian	The titular character of the web-television series. The series follows the life of this woman who talks mostly about her lesbian interests, representing the experiences of the series creator. Lizzy is sometimes joined by her best friend, Gary and they often talk about the problems they have with being homosexuals.	United States
2006–2007	Lizzy the Lezzy	2006	Lizzy	Lesbian	The titular character of the web-television series. The series follows the life of this woman who talks mostly about her lesbian interests, representing the experiences of the series creator. Lizzy is sometimes joined by her best friend, Gary and they often talk about the problems they have with being homosexuals.	Israel
2006–2007	Sasami: Magical Girls Club	April 13, 2006	Anri Misugi	Lesbian	Anri often dresses in black, doing drawings and writing words, while having the ability to make each of those words into tangible symbols as shown in "The Dreaded An-An Notebook." She has a strong infatuation with Tsukasa and lavishes words of love and flattery on her constantly. A recurring joke in the series is that she loves Tsukasa so much that she gets nosebleed when she is around her.	Japan

== 2007 ==
Duration	Show title	Character debut date	Characters	Identity	Notes	Country
2007	Blue Drop	October 2, 2007	Hagino Senkoji	Lesbian	She falls in love with a human, Mari Wakatake. Also known as Ekaril, Azanael blames her for the death of her female lover in an explosion five years earlier.	Japan
2007	Blue Drop	October 2, 2007	Mari Wakatake	Lesbian	The anime revolves around an alien species consisting solely of females. Mari Wakatake and Hagino Senkōji, fall in love with each other, and later kiss one another.	Japan
2007	Colin	June 17, 2007	Colin	Gay	Colin is a middle-aged anthropomorphic Guinea Pig who is going through a midlife crisis and dealing with everyday problems as a single gay man.	The Netherlands
2007	Colin	June 17, 2007	Roy	Gay	Roy is Colin's ex-boyfriend. They both agree it was better if they were just friends.	The Netherlands
2007	El Cazador de la Bruja	April 2, 2007	Nadie	Lesbian	Based on the manga of the same name, the story follows Nadie, a Mexican marksman and bounty hunter, helping an amnesic girl with superpowers, Ellis, find the truth about her past. Throughout the journey, their relationship turns romantic.	Japan
2007	El Cazador de la Bruja	April 2, 2007	Ellis	Lesbian	Based on the manga of the same name, the story follows Nadie, a Mexican marksman and bounty hunter, helping an amnesic girl with superpowers, Ellis, find the truth about her past. Throughout the journey, their relationship turns romantic.	Japan
2007	Shattered Angels	January 5, 2007	Himiko	Lesbian	She has an emotional bond and connection to Kaon, and is described one of her mistresses. This is also depicted in the manga.	Japan
2007	Shattered Angels	January 5, 2007	Kaon	Lesbian	Kaon is reminiscent of Chikane Himemiya, her alter ego in Kannazuki no Miko, and she wants to protect Himiko (even at a cost to herself), as Chikane did for Himeko. Kaon has her Absolute Angel mark on her left arm; at one point, Mika replaces Kaon's mark with her own so Kaon can only draw energy from Mika. Kaon's emotional bond with Himiko is interrupted, but her true nature resurfaces and her mark is restored when Himiko kisses her. This relationship was similar to what was depicted in the manga.	Japan
2007–2009	Candy Boy	May 8, 2008	Sakuya Kamiyama	Lesbian	Sakuya seeks out and stalks Kanade, saying that she's in love with her and will do anything to be with her. She pays Yukino with candies in exchange for photos and personal stuff of her sister.	Japan
2007–2009	Candy Boy	May 8, 2008	Kanade Sakurai	Lesbian	Although sisters, her relationship with Yukino Sakurai is classified as "romantic" and in most episodes, the affection between the two is displayed as though they were dating, and they kiss in the show's seventh episode.	Japan
2007–2009	Candy Boy	May 8, 2008	Yukino Sakurai	Lesbian	She is affectionate toward her sister, Kanade Sakurai, with their affection is considered romantic. During the 2007 prologue, Kanade assumes Yukino is going out with Sakuya and hence, starts to distance herself from their usual closeness. However, Yukino gets upset and begs Kanade not to leave her. In the last episode, "Cherry Blossoms have Bloomed?," Kanade lays a peck on Yukino's face, surprising her, both again admitting their love for each other.	Japan
2007–2009	Rick & Steve: The Happiest Gay Couple in All the World	July 10, 2007	Dana Bernstein	Lesbian	She is an "acerbic bulldyke" who is married to Kirsten and is Jewish. She and Kirsten have a baby with the gay couple in town, Rick and Steve.	United States
2007–2009	Rick & Steve: The Happiest Gay Couple in All the World	July 10, 2007	Kirsten Kellogg	Lesbian	She is the best friend of Rick, and a creative and naive tomboyish lesbian who is in a relationship with Dana.	United States
2007–2009	Rick & Steve: The Happiest Gay Couple in All the World	July 10, 2007	Rick Brocka	Gay	Rick is the husband of Steven and a Filipino-American who is trendy, cute, and intelligent, while obsessed with science fiction and being clean. He has a baby with Dana and Kirsten, a lesbian couple. Rick has an ex-girlfriend named Condi who wants to be a gay man and calls herself an "alternative lifestyle companion".	United States
2007–2009	Rick & Steve: The Happiest Gay Couple in All the World	July 10, 2007	Steve Ball	Gay	Steve is Rick's husband, who likes to go to the gym, and despite the fact he is not very intelligent, he makes his money by selling "shoddy real estate." He and Steve have a pet cat named Pussy who occasionally speaks. Steve is voiced by gay actor Peter Paige.	Canada
2007–2009	Rick & Steve: The Happiest Gay Couple in All the World	July 10, 2007	Chuck Masters	Gay	He is an angry, pessimistic, disabled man who is HIV positive and best friends with Steve, who he has a crush on. He is in a relationship with Evan, with both shown as a couple in various episodes, with Chuck helping Evan with his drug addiction. Chuck is voiced by bisexual actor Alan Cumming.	Canada
2007–2009	Rick & Steve: The Happiest Gay Couple in All the World	July 10, 2007	Evan Martinez	Gay	He is a pot smoker and airhead who is the boyfriend of Chuck, who he is codependent on. He is also a Latino man. Evan is voiced by gay actor Wilson Cruz.	Canada
2007–2011	The Nutshack	April 7, 2009	Cherry Pie	Trans woman	A friendly, flirtatious Vietnamese woman who is a virgin and runs a salon. She is said to dominate "the Vietnamese Cross dressing scene."	Philippines
2007–2011	The Nutshack	April 7, 2009	Cherry Pie	Trans woman	A friendly, flirtatious Vietnamese woman who is a virgin and runs a salon. She is said to dominate "the Vietnamese Cross dressing scene."	United States
2007—present	Total Drama	April 10, 2023	Bowie	Gay	Bowie is a flamboyant Black Canadian teen who introduces himself as the first openly gay contestant for Total Drama Island. He eventually gets into a relationship with Raj and shared an onscreen kiss.	Canada
2007—present	Total Drama	April 10, 2023	Raj	Gay	Raj is an Indian Canadian teen who is into hockey. He falls in love with Bowie and the latter helps him to get out of the closet.	Canada

== 2008 ==
Duration	Show title	Character debut date	Characters	Identity	Notes	Country
2008	Antique Bakery	July 3, 2008	Yusuko Ono	Gay	A famed chef named Yusuko Ono, often out of job because "he is irresistible to men," leading coworkers to fight for his affection, works at a pastry shop headed by Keisuke Tachibana whose childhood drama makes him detest cake, a former top boxing champion, Eiji Kanda, and the childhood friend of Keisuke, Chikage Kobayakawa. The latter has a short affair with Yusuko.	Japan
2008	Glass Maiden	April 8, 2008	Porilyn	Gay	Porilyn is an effeminate detective who works as a mediator for the more difficult jobs at the agency. He is openly gay and works as a drag queen.	Japan
2008	Junjo Romantica	April 10, 2008	Hiroki Kamijou	Gay	He used to be in love with Akihiko Usami, but later falls in love with and enters a relationship with Nowaki Kusama.	Japan
2008	Junjo Romantica	April 10, 2008	Misaki Takahashi	Gay	He is the suitor of Akihiko.	Japan
2008	Junjo Romantica	April 10, 2008	Akihiko Usami	Gay	Akihiko, a 28-year-old, had been in unrequited love with Takahiro for years and even entered a temporary sexual relationship with Hiroki Kamijou to forget him, but failed. He later falls for Misaki Takahashi, Takahiro's younger brother. Misaki loves Akihiko from the beginning of the series but is embarrassed to admit so.	Japan
2008	Koihime Musō	July 8, 2008	Chōryō Bun'en	Bisexual	She has an obsession and "friendly rivalry" with Kan'u, to the point of modeling her own weapon as a black version of the Green Dragon Crescent Blade, indicated in episodes like "Chōryō Faces Off with Kan'u." She also has a husband named Kazuto.	Japan
2008	Koihime Musō	April 22, 2010	Gien Bunchō	Lesbian	A good-natured and boisterous girl, she joins Ryūbi on the quest to look for medicine due to her romantic feelings for Ryūbi, who (according to Gengan) is almost like the splitting image of her deceased older sister, shown in episodes such as "Gien, Falls In Love At First Sight."	Japan
2008	Koihime Musō	September 9, 2008	Shūyu Kōkin	Lesbian	A "close friend" of Sonsaku Hakufu, she is in a romantic relationship with her.	Japan
2008	Macross Frontier	April 3, 2008	Bobby Margot	Gay	He is the flamboyant helmsman of the Macross Quarter and close friends with Ozma Lee, whom he has unrequited feelings for.	Japan
2008	Mnemosyne	February 3, 2008	Rin Asogi	Bisexual	Rin and Mimi are the main characters of the story, running a consulting business together, known as Asogi Consulting and both are immortal. Throughout the series they have an intimate relationship, kissing each other in the beginning of the first episode, for example. Later on, Mimi appears to have grown close to the second informant (the informants being a group of women) as shown in the fourth and fifth episodes. Unlike Mimi, Rin had a relationship with two men: Ihika and the Tajimamori, making her bisexual. The latter she talks to throughout the series were in a relationship over a thousands years prior, but he distanced himself from her. Even so, he impregnates her in the last episode, "And Then, to the Door of the Kingdom..."	Japan
2008	Mnemosyne	February 3, 2008	Mimi	Lesbian		Japan
2008	Monochrome Factor	April 7, 2008	Akira Nikaido	Gay	While in the manga neither Akira Nikaido nor Shirogane have romantic interest in each other, in the anime Shirogane often flirts with Akira, a 16-year-old high school student who hates school, and cooperates with Shirogane.	Japan
2008	Monochrome Factor	April 7, 2008	Shirogane	Gay	While in the manga neither Akira Nikaido nor Shirogane have romantic interest in each other, in the anime Shirogane often flirts with Akira, a 16-year-old high school student who hates school, and cooperates with Shirogane.	Japan
2008	Rosario + Vampire	January 17, 2008	Yukari Sendou	Bisexual	Yukari (a witchling), has a crush on both Moka (a female vampire) and Tsukune (a male human). Yukari openly wants to have a three-way relationship with them, but Moka and Tsukune don't return her feelings. When Yukari is introduced in both the manga and the anime, she only likes Moka, not Tsukune. Once Moka saves Yukari from being bullied by their monster schoolmates, Yukari confesses her love to her in the second episode, "Witchling and Vampire." At this point, Yukari tries to drive Moka and Tsukune apart, out of jealousy.	Japan
2008–2009	Life's a Zoo	September 1, 2008	Rico	Gay	Rico is a stereotypically gay American crocodile with a Latino swish. In the episode "Truth or Consequences", it's revealed that Rico's accent is fake and he's actually from the United States. It is also revealed Rico was just a regular person who happen to be gay but was told to "gay it up" by the producers of the series.	Canada
2008–2014	Superjail!	September 28, 2008	Alice	Trans woman	A hulking and muscular head prison guard of Superjail. She is a trans woman who regularly engages in sadomasochistic rituals with the prisoners, and rebuffs The Warden's constant advances as shown in episodes like "Jailbot 2.0."	United States
2008–2014	Superjail!	September 28, 2008	Jean Baptiste Le Ghei	Gay	The inmates Jean Baptiste Le Ghei and Paul Guaye are a recurring couple as shown in the episode "Superbar" and others. In an interview with the creators of the show, co-creator Christy Karacas called them well-rounded characters, who are a couple, with Paul as more feminine and intelligent than Jean who is "the bad boy."	United States
2008–2014	Superjail!	September 28, 2008	Paul Guaye	Gay	The inmates Jean Baptiste Le Ghei and Paul Guaye are a recurring couple as shown in the episode "Superbar" and others. In an interview with the creators of the show, co-creator Christy Karacas called them well-rounded characters, who are a couple, with Paul as more feminine and intelligent than Jean who is "the bad boy."	United States
2008–2019	A Certain Magical Index	December 6, 2008	Kuroko Shirai	Bisexual	Kuroko has an obsessive perverted lesbian crush on Mikoto as shown in the original show and in the A Certain Scientific Railgun spinoff show, where she continues to lust for Mikoto, occasionally leading to punishment. It is revealed, in a light novel, that she likes men prior to Mikoto.	Japan
2008–2019	A Certain Scientific Railgun	October 2, 2009	Kuroko Shirai	Bisexual	Kuroko has an obsessive perverted lesbian crush on Mikoto as shown in the original show and in the A Certain Scientific Railgun spinoff show, where she continues to lust for Mikoto, occasionally leading to punishment. It is revealed, in a light novel, that she likes men prior to Mikoto.	Japan

== 2009 ==
Duration	Show title	Character debut date	Characters	Identity	Notes	Country
2009	Canaan	July 4, 2009	Canaan	Lesbian	Two years before, Canaan, an elite mercenary with expert combat training, saved Maria from hoodlums during a trip somewhere in the Middle East. During this anime, both show romantic attractions toward each other, while Canaan saves Maria on multiple occasions. Canaan can sense Maria by using her synesthesia abilities. Later in the anime, Maria suggests sleeping with Canaan. In the end, both remain close even as they cannot "live side by side in Canaan's world" or in Maria's world.	Japan
2009	Canaan	July 4, 2009	Maria Ōsawa	Lesbian	Two years before, Canaan, an elite mercenary with expert combat training, saved Maria from hoodlums during a trip somewhere in the Middle East. During this anime, both show romantic attractions toward each other, while Canaan saves Maria on multiple occasions. Canaan can sense Maria by using her synesthesia abilities. Later in the anime, Maria suggests sleeping with Canaan. In the end, both remain close even as they cannot "live side by side in Canaan's world" or in Maria's world.	Japan
2009	Canaan	July 4, 2009	Liang Qi	Lesbian	One of Alphard's top lieutenants, she affectionately refers to Alphard as an elder sister, who is so obsessed with admiring and idolizing Alphard to the point of being in love with her, even though Alphard does not reciprocate. Her obsession with Alphard leads her into a mad desire to kill Canaan, believing that Alphard will then pay more attention to her.	Japan
2009	Kämpfer	October 2, 2009	Kaede Sakura	Lesbian	Kaede's infatuation with Kämpfer Natsuru quickly grows into an obsession as she begins to make romantic and later erotic advances to Natsuru's female form, Kaede is shown to be strongly into female-female romance.	Japan
2009	Kämpfer	October 2, 2009	Natsuru Senō	Genderqueer	Natsuru is a second-year student at Seitetsu High School and has a crush on Kaede Sakura, one of the school's beauties. At the start of the story, he discovers that he has transformed into a girl, and learns that he has been chosen to be a Kämpfer with Zauber, or magic, powers such as casting fireballs from the beginning of the series. As a girl, he has longer hair styled in a ponytail. After a fight with Shizuku causes him to expose his Kämpfer form to other students of the school, Natsuru is enrolled as a girl of the same name at the school. Natsuru's female form becomes the subject of intense affection from Kaede Sakura, nearly the entire female student body, and the boys, including his male classmates.	Japan
2009	Kanamemo	July 12, 2009	Yuuki Minami	Lesbian	Yume Kitaoka and Yuuki Minami are a lesbian couple. They share an expressive yuri love, even kissing in public occasionally, at various points over the course of the series.	Japan
2009	Kanamemo	July 12, 2009	Yume Kitaoka	Lesbian	She is in a romantic relationship with Yuuki Minami, kissing her occasionally.	Japan
2009	Kanamemo	July 12, 2009	Haruka Nishida	Lesbian	Haruka is attracted to girls, most notably ones under the age of 15, often making various advances on Kana, who fears her greatly in this regard. In one of the episodes, Haruka has a dream involving her sharing a kiss with Kana.	Japan
2009	Maria Holic	January 4, 2009	Kanako Miyamae	Lesbian or Bisexual	Kanako, the main protagonist, is parodied as a stereotypical "flaming lesbian" with a constant exaggerated demonstration of her attraction to other girls. The series teases about chemistry between her and Mariya, although it is not known whether she likes him because of his disguises as a girl, or as a male himself.	Japan
2009	Sit Down, Shut Up	April 19, 2009	Andrew LeGustambos	Bisexual	Andrew is a flamboyant and bisexual drama teacher whose last name in Spanish roughly translates to "he likes both", a reference to his sexual orientation. He is in love with Larry Littlejunk and Miracle Grohe, with whom he hopes to get into a relationship should they become a couple.	United States
2009	Sweet Blue Flowers	July 2, 2009	Chizu Hanashiro	Bisexual	Fumi's cousin. Chizu and Fumi were very close as children and developed a more physically intimate relationship once they were older. Fumi was in love with Chizu, but Chizu chooses to get married instead, breaking Fumi's heart. Chizu's first child looks a lot like Fumi did as a baby.	Japan
2009	Sweet Blue Flowers	July 2, 2009	Kyōko Ikumi	Lesbian	Kyōko is a reckless girl who has eyes only for Yasuko. She is in the same class as Akira and is a member of the drama club. She has been dubbed as Princess for her charm, and is also skilled in sewing, art, tennis and acting. Her mother pushes her to be engaged with a college student named Kō Sawanoi.	Japan
2009	Sweet Blue Flowers	July 2, 2009	Fumi Manjōme	Lesbian	The main character, Fumi, comes out as a lesbian in episode 4, "Adolescence is Beautiful," and has feelings for Akira Okudaira. In an interview, the composer of the show's opening theme, Ceui, said that for Fumi, her feelings toward Akira aren't just romantic but "it's a mixture of various emotions."	Japan
2009	Sweet Blue Flowers	July 2, 2009	Akira Okudaira	Lesbian	Akira, another of the main characters in the anime, is in a relationship with Fumi after a failed relationship with Yusuko, during which they kiss. Her voice actress described her as a "bright girl who is loved by everyone."	Japan
2009	Sweet Blue Flowers	July 9, 2009	Yasuko Sugimoto	Bisexual	After visiting Fujigaya Girls Academy and rejecting Kyōko's confession, Yasuko asks out Fumi, who accepts in the show's second episode. Yasuko developed romantic feelings for a teacher, Masanori Kagami, when she was attending Fujigaya. After his rejection, she switched schools and changed focus from drama to basketball. Her voice actor said that she is "a painful and clumsy love."	Japan
2009	The Goode Family	June 3, 2009	Mo	Lesbian	Mo and Trish are a lesbian couple as shown in the episode "A Tale of Two Lesbians."	United States
2009	The Goode Family	June 19, 2009	Trish	Lesbian	Mo and Trish are a lesbian couple as shown in the episode "A Tale of Two Lesbians."	United States
2009	The Goode Family	June 19, 2009	Souki	Lesbian	Souki (also spelled as Suki) and Jenn are a lesbian couple as shown in the episode "A Tale of Two Lesbians."	United States
2009	The Goode Family	June 19, 2009	Jenn	Lesbian	Souki (also spelled as Suki) and Jenn are a lesbian couple as shown in the episode "A Tale of Two Lesbians."	United States
2009	Whispered Words	October 7, 2009	Sumika Murasame	Lesbian	Sumika is intelligent, tall with long black hair and athletically gifted. However, after realizing she was in love with Ushio she decided to quit karate to try to become "cuter". She secretly loves Ushio, but the fact that Ushio does not return her feelings at all makes her suffer. Often she tries acting cuter, but has unsatisfactory results, and Ushio remains oblivious to Sumika's feelings.	Japan
2009	Whispered Words	October 7, 2009	Ushio Kazama	Lesbian	Ushio is a naive girl madly in love with cute girls and gets one-sided crushes. She considers Sumika to be a very precious friend and often says that she is "cool", "not cute" and "not her type". She is completely unaware of Sumika's feelings and her inner reaction to these words, but she develops feelings for Sumika, but is afraid to act on them.	Japan
2009	Whispered Words	October 28, 2009	Tomoe Hachisuka	Lesbian	Tomoe is one of the classmates of Sumika and Ushio who is also a lesbian. She is in a relationship with another classmate, Miyako Taema, and they kiss occasionally in the show. Tomoe is the only one able to 'control' her. As an openly lesbian couple, with Tomoe attempting to start a "Girls Club," while Miyako is bossy to boys, and end up spending more time together.	Japan
2009	Whispered Words	October 28, 2009	Miyako Taema	Lesbian	She is in a relationship with Tomoe Hachisuka, and they kiss occasionally, with Tomoe as the only one who can control her.	Japan
2009–2013	The Cleveland Show	October 18, 2009	Terry Kimple	Bisexual	Terry, Cleveland's co-worker, marries his husband Paul in one episode, "Terry Unmarried." In the same episode, Cleveland asks if Terry is gay; Terry answers no, much to Cleveland's cheer. But Terry replies he's attracted to both genders, much to Cleveland's dismay.	United States
2009–2013	The Cleveland Show	October 18, 2009	Paul	Gay	Terry, Cleveland's co-worker, marries his husband Paul in one episode, "Terry Unmarried." In the same episode, Cleveland asks if Terry is gay; Terry answers no, much to Cleveland's cheer. But Terry replies he's attracted to both genders, much to Cleveland's dismay.	United States
2009–2014	Monogatari	August 8, 2009	Suruga Kanbaru	Lesbian	Self-identifying as a lesbian, her character has been criticized for constantly flirting with Araragi and talking about "becoming his lover," because it may imply she is "faking her sexuality," a harmful lesbian stereotype.	Japan
2009–2023	Archer	September 17, 2009	Pam Poovey	Bisexual	Pam is the bisexual director of human resources. In a behind-the-scenes feature, her voice actor, Amber Nash, described Pam as "a sturdy bisexual".	United States
2009–2023	Archer	September 17, 2009	Woodhouse	Gay	Woodhouse, Archer's personal valet, is of ambiguous sexuality. He had a romantic and sexual attraction to another man, Reggie, during the First World War, but it has not been specified whether he has ever had any sexual feelings for anyone since Reggie's death. After his voice actor, George Coe, died, the show did a tribute to Woodhouse, who later had a funeral, becoming a plot thread followed up on in the show's eighth season.	United States
2009–2023	Archer	February 3, 2011	Ray Gillette	Gay	Ray is an openly gay secret agent, and a former Olympic medalist in skiing.	United States

== See also ==
- List of yuri anime and manga
- List of LGBT-related films by year
- List of animated films with LGBTQ characters
- LGBTQ themes in Western animation
- LGBTQ themes in anime and manga
