= List of animated series with LGBTQ characters: 1990–1999 =

From 1990 to 1999, more LGBTQ characters appeared in anime than in Western animation. Most prominently, LGBTQ characters appeared in series such as Revolutionary Girl Utena, Cardcaptor Sakura, One Piece, Dear Brother, Sailor Moon, and Ai no Kusabi. In contrast, Gargoyles featured an array of gay, bisexual, and asexual characters, followed by South Park and Family Guy in the later 1990s.

This list only includes recurring characters, otherwise known as supporting characters, which appear frequently from time to time during the series' run, often playing major roles in more than one episode, and those in the main cast are listed below. LGBTQ characters which are guest stars or one-off characters are listed on the pages focusing exclusively on gay, lesbian, non-binary, and bisexual animated characters, and on pages listing fictional trans, pansexual, asexual, and intersex characters.

The entries on this page are organized alphanumerically by duration dates and then alphabetically by the first letter of a specific series.

== 1990–1993 ==
Duration	Show title	Character debut date	Characters	Identity	Notes	Country
1991–1992	Dear Brother	July 14, 1991	Fukiko Ichinomiya	Bisexual	Also known as "Miya-sama," she appears to be calm, generous, and elegant, as head of the Seiran Academy sorority, while she is cruel and emotionally manipulative, often psychologically and physically torturing Rei for several ambiguous reasons. She desires that Rei only have eyes for her, no one else. She also jealously tries to destroy their relationship by making Nanako love her instead. It is then revealed that she and Rei are sisters (proving their relationship to be incestual), specifically daughters of the Ichinomiya leader and a maid of the family mansion. In the anime, she is shown to that she fell in love Takehiko when she was twelve and he spent several days with her in the Ichinomiya mansion, but he unknowingly broke her heart by not showing up to her birthday party.	Japan
1991–1992	Dear Brother	July 14, 1991	Mariko Shinobu	Lesbian	Mariko greatly admires Kaoru due to her strength and the emotional support she gives her, and she admits to loving Kaoru. Mariko distrusts all men because her father Hikawa is an erotica author who has an affair with an actress and later divorces Mariko's mother Hisako, who keeps her sadness bottled up as, she raises Mariko practically on her own.	Japan
1991–1992	Dear Brother	July 14, 1991	Nanako Misonoo	Lesbian	16-year-old Nanako, a student at Seiran Academy, falls in love with Rei Asaka, who goes by the nickname Saint-Just-Sama, one of the school beauties. Rei slowly reciprocates her feelings and their relationship is one of the major driving plots of the series. However, Rei's destructive relationship with Fukiko Ichinomiya leads her to be troubled, obsessed with death, and drug-addicted. Kaoru also has a close relationship with Rei, and they care about each other, but they never get romantically involved. Some critics have described Rei as a "gender non-conforming hero" and a butch woman, due to her masculine aura, and having romantic relationships with other women.	Japan
1991–1992	Dear Brother	July 14, 1991	Rei Asaka	Lesbian		Japan
1992–1994	Ai no Kusabi	August 1, 1992	Daryl	Gay	Daryl is an eighteen-year-old castrated boy who served as Iason's furniture and Riki's caretaker. He fell in love with Riki because of his pride and strong will.	Japan
1992–1994	Ai no Kusabi	August 1, 1992	Guy	Gay	Guy was Riki's lover prior to his capture and Guy is determined to save Riki from Iason.	Japan
1992–1994	Ai no Kusabi	August 1, 1992	Iason	Gay	He is the most superior and powerful Blondie in Tanagura, and the head of the Syndicate, Tanagura's black market for pet trade. He is in love with his pet Riki, a mongrel from the slums, and later he begins to love Riki to the point of obsession.	Japan
1992–1994	Ai no Kusabi	August 1, 1992	Kirie	Gay	A wild member of the Bison gang who is ambitious and sly. Riki hates him as he reminds him of his former rebellious self but Kirie himself is romantically obsessed with Riki.	Japan
1992–1994	Ai no Kusabi	August 1, 1992	Riki	Bisexual	Riki was once the gang leader of the Bison gang. However he was captured and kept as a pet for three years by Iason who grew obsessively in love with him. One reviewer found the characterization of Iason in the third novel to be realistic and compelling, Prior to this, Riki was in a relationship with Guy. He also once engaged in a one-night stand with a female slave named Mimea.	Japan
1992–1997	Sailor Moon	June 13, 1992	Zoisite	Gay (90s anime only)	In the 1990s anime series, Zoisite is in a relationship with Kunzite, another powerful general who works under Queen Beryl from the Dark Kingdom. Zoisite was described as having a personality of an "effeminate, youngest-child type" in the Materials Collection of the manga. Zoisite would later appear in Sailor Moon Crystal without being depicted as gay.	Japan
1992–1997	Sailor Moon	June 13, 1992	Kunzite	Gay (90s anime only)	In the 1990s anime series, Kunzite is in a relationship with Zoisite, a powerful general. Kunzite was described as having the "air of an Arabian king," while being calm, silent, and frightening when he gets angry. Kunzite would later appear in Sailor Moon Crystal without being depicted as gay.	Japan
1992–1997	Sailor Moon	April 19, 1994	Haruka Tenoh (Sailor Uranus)	Lesbian	Haruka and Michiru are in a relationship. This was changed in the original release of the English version of the anime, where they were made "cousins". In the re-release of the original anime however the English version keeps their same-sex relationship. In a September 1996 interview, the creator of Sailor Moon, Naoko Takeuchi, said that they began as friends, with their friendship flowing "into love," adding that a "true love between two women could exist," in the case of Haruka and Michiru. In a 1999 interview, Takeuchi reasserted this, adding that Michiru is "girlish and feminine" and Haruka is "kind of boyish and has the heart of a guy." She also called Haruka a "masculine woman".	Japan
1992–1997	Sailor Moon	April 19, 1994	Michiru Kaioh (Sailor Neptune)	Lesbian		Japan
1992–1997	Sailor Moon	March 4, 1995	Fish-Eye	Gay	The villain Fish-Eye is an effeminate cross-dressing man who is romantically interested in men as first shown in the episode "Meeting of Destiny: The Night Pegasus Dances." He was changed into a woman in the original English dub. He was described as acting like a clumsy "ball-balancing girl" at the circus. Fish-Eeye and other members of the Amazon Trio reappeared in Sailor Moon Eternal.	Japan
1992–1997	Sailor Moon	December 7, 1996	Sailor Starlights	Genderqueer (90s anime only)	In the 90s anime series, the Sailor Starlights (Sailor Star Fighter, Sailor Star Maker, and Sailor Star Healer) were born female, but transform to present and refer to themselves as males when not fighting, as shown in the episode, "Holy War in the Galaxy! Sailor Wars Legend." Some speculated that the final season of the series, in which these characters appeared, did not receive an English dub because of season's "assertion that genderfluid people...exist." In a 1999 interview, Takeuchi said she had made them always girls in the manga; in the anime, "they got turned into guys, which displeased me and I wasn't very happy about it." They later appeared in Sailor Moon Cosmos without being depicted as genderqueer.	Japan

== 1994 ==
Duration	Show title	Character debut date	Characters	Identity	Notes	Country
1994–1997	Gargoyles	October 24, 1994	Lexington	Gay	In a 2008 interview, series creator Greg Weisman stated that Lexington is gay. In May 2005, Weisman responded to fans about Lexington's gay identity, saying that Lexington hadn't "completely come to terms with his sexuality" when he went out with Angela. He also said that while he wasn't trying to hint with anything in the series, he knew Lexington was gay "sometime in '95 or '96," although he couldn't have addressed in the show directly, because he would have been fired if he had done so. He further said that Lexington, as a gay person, tells his own truths, as does every character.	United States
1994–1997	Gargoyles	November 4, 1994	Janine Renard	Bisexual	Former leader of The Pack, born with the name of Janine Renard, and later legally turns her name to Fox. She falls in love with David Xanatos, a young businessman, beginning in "The Thrill of the Hunt" episode whom she marries in the show's second season, in the episode "Vows." She could have a liking to Titania, the wife of Oberon and queen of the Third race, as shown in the episode "The Gathering." Weisman confirmed her as a bisexual woman.	United States
1994–1997	Gargoyles	September 11, 1995	Owen Burnett	Asexual	Formerly the aid of Xanatos' aide, who is later revealed to be the immortal trickster Puck. Weisman confirmed Owen as asexual in response to various fan questions, but said that he had still dated a woman in the past.	United States
1994–1997	Gargoyles	September 11, 1995	Puck	Bisexual	Weisman confirmed Puck as bisexual in response to a fan in September 2014.	United States
1994-2008	Space Ghost Coast to Coast	December 25, 1994 (Note: Lokar was first mentioned in a September 16, 1994 episode)	Lokar	Gay	Lokar is a locust-like alien and member of the Council of Doom. He is Zorak's rival. Lokar, is the opposite of Zorak as in he is a cultured snob, as opposed to being a crude slob like Zorak. There are hints throughout the series that Lokar is gay. He has referred to male characters as either lover or darling and appeared to have romantic feelings for Moltar as shown in the episodes "Explode", "Surprise" and "Waiting for Edward". Supplementary material for the series had Lokar referred to himself as a Confirmed bachelor. One article for Lokar's section in the official Cartoon Network website titled Lokar's Sumptuous Salute to Summer Frolic features a reference to a slang word for gay sex. Lokar disappeared after the fifth season aside from a wanted poster in the season eight episode "Whipping Post". His sexuality was confirmed in audio commentaries for the Space Ghost Coast to Coast Volume 2 DVD. It was also revealed that Lokar died at some point during the series. However this was eventually contradicted when Lokar returned in Season 11 in where he is shown to be alive and well. Lokar also appeared in Space Ghost and Jellystone!.	United States

== 1995 ==
Duration	Show title	Character debut date	Characters	Identity	Notes	Country
1995	Dirty Pair Flash: Mission II	June 1, 1995	Leena	Lesbian	Leena had caught the eye of Touma when he and Yuri were caught on one of the planet's planned rainy days, as shown in episodes such as "Tokyo Holiday Network." From the time he set eyes on her, Touma was smitten with her but he didn't count on the fact that Leena was a lesbian who had her eyes on Yuri, who seems to have feelings for Kei.	Japan
1995–1996	El Hazard: The Magnificent World	October 21, 1995	Alielle Relryle	Lesbian	Alielle is presented as a comical character who makes other women uncomfortable because of her open attraction to them, in episodes such as "The World of Thunder." She has been described as a "midget flaming lesbian" who sees Princess Fatora Venus as her the "only object" of her affection as shown in episodes like "The World of Mindless Adventures." She also appears in the second OVA, in 1997, titled "El Hazard: The Magnificent World 2."	Japan
1995–1996	El Hazard: The Magnificent World	October 21, 1995	Fatora Venus	Lesbian	An apparently open lesbian, 23-year-old Fatora is like her primary lover Alielle in that she has an overdeveloped sex drive and little concern for the concept of "faithfulness" or even "disinterested", indicated in episodes like "The World of Mindless Adventures." While it is implied that she has had many other "once-off" lovers in the past, and is attracted to Kalia, she is fixated on Shayla-Shayla and Nanami Jinnai. In the episode "The Bride of Roshtari," the manages to fool Shayla-Shayla sufficiently that she manages to kiss her, naturally prompting a fiery explosion of fury when the priestess realizes who just claimed her first kiss. Fatora also has a crush on Gilda of the emperor's guards. Like Alielle, she appears in the second OVA, "El Hazard: The Magnificent World 2."	Japan
1995–1996	Fushigi Yûgi	April 20, 1995	Nuriko	Bisexual	Nuriko initially dresses and acts as a woman named Kang-lin, one of Hotohori's concubines because Kang-lin was his twin sister who died and he wanted to keep her memory alive as shown in the episode, "The Seven Stars of Suzaku." He enjoys cross-dressing, as indicates in the episode "Even If I Die...," and is in love with Hotohori, but later also grows to love the main heroine Miaka as indicated in the episode "Brief Parting."	Japan
1995–1997	Crapston Villas	October 27, 1995	Robbie	Gay	The series was one of the first animated series on British television to present openly gay characters.	United Kingdom
1995–1997	Crapston Villas	October 27, 1995	Larry	Gay	The series was one of the first animated series on British television to present openly gay characters.	United Kingdom

== 1996 ==
Duration	Show title	Character debut date	Characters	Identity	Notes	Country
1996–1997	You're Under Arrest	November 12, 1996	Aoi Futaba	Trans woman	Aoi Futaba was initially male but once had to go undercover as a woman in a sting operation to catch some male molesters targeting women. However, she went "native" and has since considered herself and has been treated by her colleagues as a trans woman. Though her romantic preferences are made unclear, she seems to prefer men, as shown in episodes like "Aoi-chan has a White Rose."	Japan
1996–1998	Blazing Dragons	September 9, 1996	Sir Blaze	Gay	Sir Blaze is a member of the Square Table which is composed of dragon knights. His mother is married to the king. Writers were mindful of it being a children's show, with those working on the show understanding Blaze was a gay character, who is flamboyant and effeminate, and as such, throughout the series, he is implied to be gay, according to series director Lawrence Jacobs.	Canada
1996–1998	Blazing Dragons	September 9, 1996	Sir Blaze	Gay	Sir Blaze is a member of the Square Table which is composed of dragon knights. His mother is married to the king. Writers were mindful of it being a children's show, with those working on the show understanding Blaze was a gay character, who is flamboyant and effeminate, and as such, throughout the series, he is implied to be gay, according to series director Lawrence Jacobs.	France
1996–2000	Superman: The Animated Series	February 1, 1997	Maggie Sawyer	Lesbian	Maggie Sawyer is the captain of the Metropolis Special Crimes Unit. In the comics, Maggie is a lesbian. Toby Raynes, Maggie Sawyer's romantic partner, and a reporter for the Metropolis Star, is seen by her bedside in several hospital scenes and later Turpin's funeral service in the two-part episode, "Apokolips...Now!". Bruce Timm states in the commentary for "Tools of the Trade" that those scenes were the creators' way of acknowledging Sawyer's sexual orientation. In the comics, Maggie is also portrayed as a lesbian who comes to terms with her own sexual identity. The comic strip was later recognized as the 7th Outstanding Comic Strip at the March 1996 GLAAD Media Awards.	United States
1996–2004	Hey Arnold!	October 7, 1996	Eugene Horowitz	Gay	On July 26, 2016, the show's creator Craig Bartlett stated that Eugene "is kind of 'proto-gay', so he's uncomfortable getting close to any girl" during an interview with BuzzFeed, though this was never explicitly stated during the show. Bartlett stated: "We always figured Eugene was kind of proto-gay. He's not gay yet, he just will be. He loves musical theater, and he's a wonderful guy." This was never explicitly disclosed in the series. Eugene's voice actor for season 5 is Blake McIver Ewing, a gay musician.	United States
1996–2004	Hey Arnold!	September 22, 1997	Mr. Robert Simmons	Gay	In July 2016, Bartlett confirmed that Mr. Simmons was gay during an interview with BuzzFeed. Several episodes throughout the series hinted at Mr. Simmons' sexuality, including "Arnold's Thanksgiving", a Thanksgiving-themed episode which implies that one of his dinner guests, Peter, is his boyfriend, and that Simmons' mother wants him to date a female friend. However, it was never explicitly stated he was gay. Mr. Simmons also appears in Hey Arnold!: The Jungle Movie in which he is shown hugging Peter. A clip from "Arnold's Thanksgiving" was uploaded on the official Nickelodeon Animation Studio YouTube channel in June 2018 during Pride Month in which the description refers to Peter as Mr. Simmons' partner. His voice actor, Dan Butler is also gay.	United States
1996–2011	The Ambiguously Gay Duo	September 28, 1996	Ace	Gay	These two superheroes engage in acts of heroism which are "ambiguously homosexual." In June 2020, Robert Smigel, one of the series creators, told The Daily Beast that the engine of the show was an "obsession with sexuality" and that he thought that it was funny because the homophobes and everyone are obsessed with finding out whether the superheroes are gay or not, calling it "sport and titillation."	United States
1996–2011	The Ambiguously Gay Duo	September 28, 1996	Gary	Gay	These two superheroes engage in acts of heroism which are "ambiguously homosexual." In June 2020, Robert Smigel, one of the series creators, told The Daily Beast that the engine of the show was an "obsession with sexuality" and that he thought that it was funny because the homophobes and everyone are obsessed with finding out whether the superheroes are gay or not, calling it "sport and titillation."	United States
1996–2022	Arthur	October 7, 1996	Nigel Ratburn	Gay	Mr. Ratburn, and another man, Patrick, get married in the series season 22 premiere, "Mr. Ratburn and the Special Someone," which aired on May 13, 2019. As such, he and Patrick are the only LGBT characters in the series.	United States
1996–2022	Arthur	May 13, 2019	Patrick	Gay	Mr. Ratburn, and another man, Patrick, get married in the series season 22 premiere, "Mr. Ratburn and the Special Someone," which aired on May 13, 2019. As such, he and Patrick are the only LGBT characters in the series.	United States

== 1997 ==
Duration	Show title	Character debut date	Characters	Identity	Notes	Country
1997	Revolutionary Girl Utena	April 2, 1997	Anthy Himemiya	Queer	She is in love with Utena Tenjou, another series protagonist, with their love confirmed by director Kunihiko Ikuhara. The characters are seen kissing both in the TV show credits and the movie. At the beginning of the series, Anthy is engaged to an abusive man named Kyouichi Saionji, and it is later revealed that her brother, Akio, has been sexually assaulting her. This differs from the manga where Anthy has a less violent relationship with Akio and a romantic relationship with Utena. Anthy's exact sexual identity has been debated by critics and fans. Some described her as "bisexual," while others described her as a "lesbian" or "queer" woman.	Japan
1997	Revolutionary Girl Utena	April 2, 1997	Utena Tenjou	Queer	Apart from being in love with Anthy Himemiya, Utena is also in love with Akio Ohtori, a man who manipulates her. She crossdresses as a prince and fights to protect Anthy, the Rose Bride, from harm, throughout the series, and works to free her from being the Rose Bride, even using her remaining strength in the final episodes to do so. The series later influenced creators like Rebecca Sugar. Some critics have described Utena as "bisexual," while others have said she was "lesbian" or "queer".	Japan
1997	Revolutionary Girl Utena	April 2, 1997	Juri Arisugawa	Lesbian	Juri is explicitly in love with her female classmate, Shiori, in both the TV series and movie. She is described as "homosexual" by the creators in the DVD booklet. The commentary in the booklet indicated that Shiori also had feelings for her, but was too troubled and insecure to act on them in a healthy way. As such, Juri and Shiori have crushes on each other but do not known how to act on them.	Japan
1997	Revolutionary Girl Utena	July 2, 1997	Akio Ohtori	Bisexual	Akio is the brother of Anthy. He and Touga Kiryuu were shown in bed together, and both are playboys with a number of female conquests, with Akio's conquests including Utena and Kozue. As a result of his actions, Utena starts to fall in love with him.	Japan
1997	Revolutionary Girl Utena	April 2, 1997	Touga Kiryuu	Bisexual	While Keiko, Yuuko, and Aiko have crushes on Touga, who is beloved by girls, and later feels jealous of Akio's closeness to Utena, as he has a romantic relationship with Akio. Otherwise, he is a playboy and is Anthy's ex-boyfriend before Utena. which is shown in Adolescence of Utena.	Japan
1997	Revolutionary Girl Utena	July 9, 1997	Kozue Kaoru	Bisexual	Kozue Kaoru is obsessively in love with her twin brother, Miki. In one episode, "The Landscape Framed by Kozue," she was shown kissing Anthy, and seems to have a crush on her.	Japan
1997	Revolutionary Girl Utena	July 23, 1997	Shiori Takatsuki	Bisexual	Childhood friend of Juri Arisugawa who returns to Ohtori Academy. She idolized Juri in the past, but this caused her to question their friendship and she eventually became paranoid as indicated in the episode "Thorns of Death." When she finds out that Juri had feelings for her, she acts cruel but has been aware of these feelings toward her for a long period. Even so, she cares enough about Juri to apologize to her, in the episode "Azure Paler Than the Sky," although it is not clear if Juri returns her feelings. In the movie, Shiori sleeps with Touga Kiryuu.	Japan
1997–present	King of the Hill	April 28, 2002	Bug Gribble	Gay	In one of the episodes, "My Own Private Rodeo," Dale's father, Bug has come out and participates in the gay rodeo circuit. Bug is married to Juan Pedro. The episode was later nominated for a GLAAD Media Award for "Outstanding Individual Episode" in a "series without a regular gay character."	United States
1997–present	King of the Hill	April 28, 2002	Juan Pedro	Gay	In one of the episodes, "My Own Private Rodeo," Dale's father, Bug has come out and participates in the gay rodeo circuit. Bug is married to Juan Pedro. The episode was later nominated for a GLAAD Media Award for "Outstanding Individual Episode" in a "series without a regular gay character."	United States
1997–present	South Park	August 13, 1997	Liane Cartman	Bisexual	In the early seasons, Liane was very sexually active and regularly pursued this activity. She also had no issue with having sexual relations with complete strangers, usually inviting them to the home as frequent visitors. This desire was not strictly for men, for it is hinted in one episode, "Cartman's Mom Is Still a Dirty Slut" that she had intercourse with Ms. Crabtree, Mayor McDaniels, and Sheila Broflovski.	United States
1997–present	South Park	August 13, 1997	Herbert Garrison	Lesbian trans woman	Originally presented as a closeted homosexual, the storylines have featured Garrison coming out as a gay man, then having a gender reassignment surgery to become female (known as Janet Garrison), becoming a lesbian, and then changing back to a man. It is shown he still has feelings for his ex-boyfriend, Mr. Slave, as shown in the episode "Follow That Egg!"	United States
1997–present	South Park	August 13, 1997	Herbert Garrison	Gay	Originally presented as a closeted homosexual, the storylines have featured Garrison coming out as a gay man, then having a gender reassignment surgery to become female (known as Janet Garrison), becoming a lesbian, and then changing back to a man. It is shown he still has feelings for his ex-boyfriend, Mr. Slave, as shown in the episode "Follow That Egg!"	United States
1997–present	South Park	August 27, 1997	Jimbo Kern	Gay	In the episode "It Hits the Fan", Jimbo realizes he is gay after he can say the word "fag" without being bleeped according to Mr. Garrison.	United States
1997–present	South Park	September 3, 1997	Big Gay Al	Gay	He is a stereotypical homosexual man known for his flamboyant and positive demeanor introduced in the episode "Big Gay Al's Big Gay Boat Ride." Big Gay Al openly displays his homosexuality and is an advocate for gay rights. He is married to Mr. Slave, as shown in the episode "Follow That Egg!"	United States
1997–present	South Park	December 17, 1997	Craig Tucker	Gay	Craig and Tweek are seen frequently throughout the nineteenth, twentieth, and twenty-first seasons holding hands and hanging out with each other, shown in episodes such as "Tweek x Craig" and "Put It Down. It is confirmed by the official website and blog that they are in a relationship, and that they became an official couple in the episode "Tweek x Craig." Craig also had an unnamed girlfriend before he realized he was gay, and dumped her.	United States
1997–present	South Park	December 17, 1997	Tweek Tweak	Gay	Craig and Tweek are seen frequently throughout the nineteenth, twentieth, and twenty-first seasons holding hands and hanging out with each other, shown in episodes such as "Tweek x Craig" and "Put It Down. It is confirmed by the official website and blog that they are in a relationship, and that they became an official couple in the episode "Tweek x Craig." Craig also had an unnamed girlfriend before he realized he was gay, and dumped her.	United States
1997–present	South Park	February 11, 1998	Ms. Ellen	Lesbian	In one episode, "Tom's Rhinoplasty," Chef reveals that the new teacher Ms. Ellen, voiced by Natasha Henstridge, is lesbian. Some of her male students are attracted to her and don't understand what lesbians are, and try to "become lesbians" too, to get her attention.	United States
1997–present	South Park	April 1, 1998	Saddam Hussein	Gay	Saddam and Satan are presented as a gay couple in the series and in films. However, although both have "kinky sex," with Saddam calling Satan a "cum bucket," their relationship ends after Satan decides to stay a single man after talking with God, resulting in Saddam being sent to Heaven.	United States
1997–present	South Park	April 1, 1998	Satan	Gay	Satan is in a romantic, and abusive, relationship with Saddam during the series, but later ends it after talking with God, deciding to remain single instead. He also has a relationship with a man named Chris, and has a short-lived relationship with a male demon, Kevin.	United States
1997–present	South Park	May 27, 1998	Stephen Stotch	Bisexual	Despite being married to Linda, Butters' father, Stephen Stotch, is revealed to be a regular customer at the local gay theater & bath house as shown in "Butters' Very Own Episode," and claiming to Linda that he only did so out of curiosity, Stephen promises to suppress any future homosexual urges. However, some episodes, like "Insecurity," show him pursuing these acts in secret.	United States
1997–present	South Park	November 20, 2002	Mr. Slave	Gay	Mr. Slave was Mrs. Garrison's boyfriend until she made the transition into a female in the episode "Mr. Garrison's Fancy New Vagina." He is now married to Big Gay Al, as of the episode, "Follow That Egg."	United States

== 1998 ==
Duration	Show title	Character debut date	Characters	Identity	Notes	Country
1998	Outlaw Star	February 12, 1998	Fred Luo	Gay	Fred is a 20-year-old camp weapons merchant who is known to be flamboyant and openly gay, as first shown in the episode "The Beautiful Assassin." He has a strong infatuation for the series' main protagonist, Gene Starwind, whom he supplies arms to. He has a fiancée, named "Reiko Ando," but eschews marriage.	Japan
1998–1999	Devil Lady	October 11, 1998	Jun Fudo	Lesbian	Her "devilman" is awoken by Kazumi, a high school student. Over the course of the series, the relationship between Jun and Kazumi gradually progresses into an almost romantic one. Most notably in the last episode, titled "Man," Jun decides to forge her soul with the force from the Demons, which Kazumi also lets her absorb her to help in the final battle with Asuka.	Japan
1998–1999	Devil Lady	October 11, 1998	Kazumi Takiura	Lesbian	Awakens the "devilman" inside of Jun and begins a romantic relationship with her, after she begins living with her.	Japan
1998–1999	Sorcerous Stabber Orphen	February 27, 1999	Stephanie	Trans woman	Stephanie, also known as Steph, was Orphen's old partner and initially a man but was severely injured and while using the rest of his magic to cast a healing spell, made some "modifications", and became the trans woman Stephanie, as shown in the episode "Snake in the Temple." She falls in love with and marries her boyfriend the florist Tim but continues to help Orphen and his friends, although she later becomes their foe.	Japan
1998–2000	Cardcaptor Sakura	April 7, 1998	Tomoyo Daidouji	Lesbian	Tomoyo is in love with the show's protagonist, and friend, Sakura, even loving what she wears. As such, she is intensely devoted to Sakura. Unfortunately for Tomoyo, Sakura does not return her feelings, even though she does help her find her voice. At some point, Tomoyo confesses her love to Sakura, but Sakura misunderstands her, thinking she means "love" as a best friend, and Tomoyo says that she will explain when Sakura is older. Some scholars have argued that based on Tomoyo's romantic attractions she is asexual. CLAMP artist Nanase Ohkawa described Tomoyo as more than an "interesting friend" for Sakura, saying that someone she could "talk about her magic," and saying that Tomoyo just "wanted Sakura to be happy."	Japan
1998–2000	Cardcaptor Sakura	April 7, 1998	Touya Kinomoto	Bisexual	He is the older brother of Sakura and is often worried about her. His relationship with Yukito has been confirmed by the series creators. Before meeting Yukito, Touya dated Kaho Mizuki when she was his junior high school teacher, and she broke up with him when she left to study in England. As such, some argued that Touya was either bisexual or pansexual.	Japan
1998–2000	Cardcaptor Sakura	April 7, 1998	Yukito Tsukishiro	Gay	He is in a romantic relationship with Touya, with the official website calling him Touya's "best friend." As a result, Yukito rejects Sakura's feelings for him because he is in love with Touya. In February 2000, Owkawa said that "such a warm, gentle character like Yukito" is uncommon in CLAMP works, repeating the same in a 2004 interview. Ohkawa said in February 2000 that "you can see Yukito and Touya as being friends, or as going beyond that." Yukito's alternate form is Yue. He also appears in Tsubasa Reservoir Chronicle, as a High Priest, and Toya as a king, of the Clow Kingdom.	Japan
1998–2000	Cardcaptor Sakura	April 7, 1998	Ruby Moon	Intersex	Ruby Moon has no biological sex. They are always seen presenting as female, even though Spinel Sun often asks them why don't they present as male for a change. At some points, Ruby Moon states that their gender does not matter because they are not actually human and also that girls have cuter clothes. They appear to have a crush on Touya. Like Syaoran, Sakura, Touya, Yukita, and Tomoyo, they also reappear in Cardcaptor Sakura: Clear Card.	Japan

== 1999 ==
Duration	Show title	Character debut date	Characters	Identity	Notes	Country
1999–2000	Infinite Ryvius	October 6, 1999	Criff Cay	Trans woman	Criff Cay is a member of the group Team Blue. She is indicated to be transgender when her sister Michelle refers to her as "Big Brother". Her character profile lists her sex as male.	Japan
1999–2000	Infinite Ryvius	October 6, 1999	Stein Heigar	Gay	Stein Heigar is a member of the group Zwei. Heigar is gay.	Japan
1999–2002	Mission Hill	September 24, 1999	Gus Duncz	Gay	He is an elderly man married to Wally Langford, who is also in his late 60s. Both may appear in an upcoming series by the same show creators tentatively titled "Gus & Wally." Gus played the main role in a film, "The Man From Pluto" which was directed by Wally.	United States
1999–2002	Mission Hill	September 24, 1999	Wally Langford	Gay	He is married to Gus Duncz, In the 1950s, he directed a film, "The Man From Pluto," and is later shown he works as a projectionist at a local theater.	United States
1999–present	Family Guy	January 31, 1999	Lois Griffin	Bisexual	Lois Griffin is married to Peter Griffin. She has cheated on him with both men and women. The season 23 episode "Cool Hand Lois" has Lois Griffin coming to terms with her bisexuality, and officially comes out to her family.	United States
1999–present	Family Guy	January 31, 1999	Stewie Griffin	Bisexual	Stewie has been in relationships with female babies, but is also attracted towards males. In the commentary for Stewie Griffin: The Untold Story, the writers describe how they were going to make Stewie discover he was gay, but decided to scrap this idea to retain Stewie's sexual ambiguity for writing purposes. MacFarlane planned for the series' third season to end with Stewie coming out of the closet after a near-death experience. The show's abrupt cancellation, before later continuing, caused MacFarlane to abort these plans, and the episode "Queer Is Stewie?" was actually produced, but never shown. In a 2008 interview, MacFarlane said those who work on the show "all feel that Stewie is almost certainly gay, and he's in the process of figuring it out for himself."	United States
1999–present	Family Guy	April 18, 1999	Bruce	Gay	Bruce often talks to his roommate Jeffrey. It was implied that Bruce is gay and that Jeffrey is his domestic partner, as in "Road to the North Pole" where he states in the song "All I Want for Christmas" that he wants a wedding ring from a guy named Jeffrey. In "Meg's Wedding", Bruce briefly had a romantic relationship with Meg until they ended it on the wedding day after Bruce finally accepted himself as gay. Bruce finally got engaged to Jeffrey in a parking lot since the priest wouldn't allow them to marry in the church. In the season 22 premiere "Fertilized Megg", Bruce and Jeffrey have a baby girl named Liza Judy Barbra who is conceived through surrogacy. Their marriage unfortunately came to an end when Jeffrey was killed by a shark in the season 23 episode "The Fat Lotus". Bruce eventually started dating his friend Dennis.	United States
1999–present	Family Guy	July 12, 2000	Jasper	Gay	Jasper is a dog who is Brian Griffin's gay cousin. Jasper marries his Filipino partner Ricardo in "You May Now Kiss the... Uh... Guy Who Receives." The episode had to be changed various times due to issues with censors, according to audio commentary, with MacFarlane saying the episode was put together after he had teamed up to write it with two gay writers.	United States
1999–present	Family Guy	November 15, 2001	John Herbert	Gay	Herbert is an elderly man. He has an ephebophiliac and hebephiliac attraction to young boys, and harbors unrequited love for underage teenager Chris Griffin, though most other citizens of Quahog are oblivious to his sexuality. His voice actor Mike Henry defines Herbert as a pedophile.	United States
1999–present	Family Guy	May 9, 2010	Ida Davis	Trans woman	The "father" of Glenn and Brenda Quagmire and the ex-"husband" of Crystal Quagmire. Ida (formerly Dan) was a war hero in the Vietnam War, and was thought to be a homosexual by Peter. When Glenn asked his "father" if this was true, Ida claimed that she was a woman trapped in a man's body and came to Quahog for a sex reassignment surgery, taking the name Ida Davis afterward as noted in the episode "Quagmire's Dad." From Season 17 onward, she became a recurring character, and some criticized her role in the show, stating that her character was previously the "butt of many transmisogynistic and transphobic "jokes,"" and that the show does not promote inclusivity.	United States
1999–present	Futurama	April 4, 1999	Amy Wong	Bisexual	Amy Wong is a Martian woman of Chinese descent and a series protagonist. Although Amy has been in a long-term relationship with Kif Kroker, a male alien, and raising his three surviving children with him; in the episode titled "The Numberland Gap" in thirteenth broadcast season (tenth production season), she inadvertently outs herself as bisexual. This was previously hinted in the 2008 direct-to-video film Futurama: Bender's Game when she, as Gynaecaladrial, kisses Leegola (centaur version of Turanga Leela) in the alternate world of Cornwood. She kisses Professor Farnsworth in the same film. Otherwise, throughout the series, she is depicted attracted to men. She fights with Leela over Philip J. Fry (who she is attracted to), in the episode "The ButterJunk Effect." She also is attracted to robots and had a relationship with Bender Rodriguez, in episodes such as Proposition Infinity, with both sleeping together, which the series describes as "robosexuality".	United States
1999–present	Futurama	November 14, 1999	Hermaphrobot	Trans woman	Hermaphrobot is a manbot-to-fembot transgender Robot, who often engages Bender in a subversive manner, saying she is "more lady" than Bender could handle. Some critics have criticized her "intersex slur-referencing name," and her character being defined by her physical attributes, while playing into stereotypes.	United States
1999–present	One Piece	August 26, 2001	Mr. Bon Kurei	Genderqueer & Gay	Also known as Bentham of the Wild and "Mr. 2 Bon Clay," he has powers that allows him to shapeshift into any form he wishes and crossdresses as a woman, and has a kempo called the "Okama Kempo" He is a recurring character, has defeated many villains, and was once an enemy of the Straw Hat Grand Fleet. He is part of "Baroque Works," and has been described as being "associated with queer gender identities."	Japan
1999–present	One Piece	February 14, 2010	Emporio Ivankov	Genderqueer & Gay	Ivankov is the self-declared queen of an island populated by okama, having powers that allow him to shift between male and female forms, while also changing genders of other individuals. Also known as Iva, and has been involved in various battles with villains over the course of the show.	Japan
1999–present	One Piece	February 14, 2010	Okamas	Genderqueer & Gay	More than one person, but a whole group of individuals, and are named after the tricky and controversial Japanese word "okama."	Japan
1999–present	One Piece	April 14, 2019	Morley	Trans woman	A giant and as well as the commander of the West Army in the Revolutionary Army.	Japan
1999–present	One Piece	August 25, 2019	Kikunojo "Kiku"	Trans woman	In both the manga and anime, Kiku is revealed to be a trans woman. Before being transported to the future, Kiku dressed in more masculine clothing typical of a samurai. After arriving in the future, Kiku began showing a significantly more feminine side, such as wearing red lipstick and dressing more in feminine clothing, and has described herself as a "a woman at heart," while she was assigned male at birth.	Japan
1999–present	One Piece	May 2, 2021	Yamato	Ambiguous	He idolized Kozuki Oden as a child, emulating everything about the samurai warrior, and his pronouns are respected by Kozuki. He has also been described as a "rebellious son of a pirate emperor," and noted as a fan-favorite character.	Japan
1999–present	SpongeBob SquarePants	May 1, 1999	SpongeBob	Asexual	According to an interview with Stephen Hillenburg in 2002, SpongeBob is neither gay or straight but in fact, asexual. This was once again clarified in 2005, because of the controversy on SpongeBob and Patrick's sexual orientation. Hillenburg also instructed that SpongeBob should never have a romantic relationship, since he is asexual (as all real-life sea sponges are) and is too innocent for it.	United States

== See also ==
- List of yuri anime and manga
- List of LGBT-related films by year
- List of animated films with LGBTQ characters
- LGBTQ themes in Western animation
- LGBTQ themes in anime and manga
