= Atashi =

Atashi is a Persian surname that may refer to the following notable people:

- Enayatollah Atashi (born 1945), Iranian basketball coach
- Manouchehr Atashi (1931–2006), Iranian poet
- Mehrad Atashi (born 1986), Iranian basketball player
- Zeidan Atashi (born 1940), Israeli diplomat of Druze descent

== See also ==
- Japanese pronouns
