= List of non-binary characters in animation =

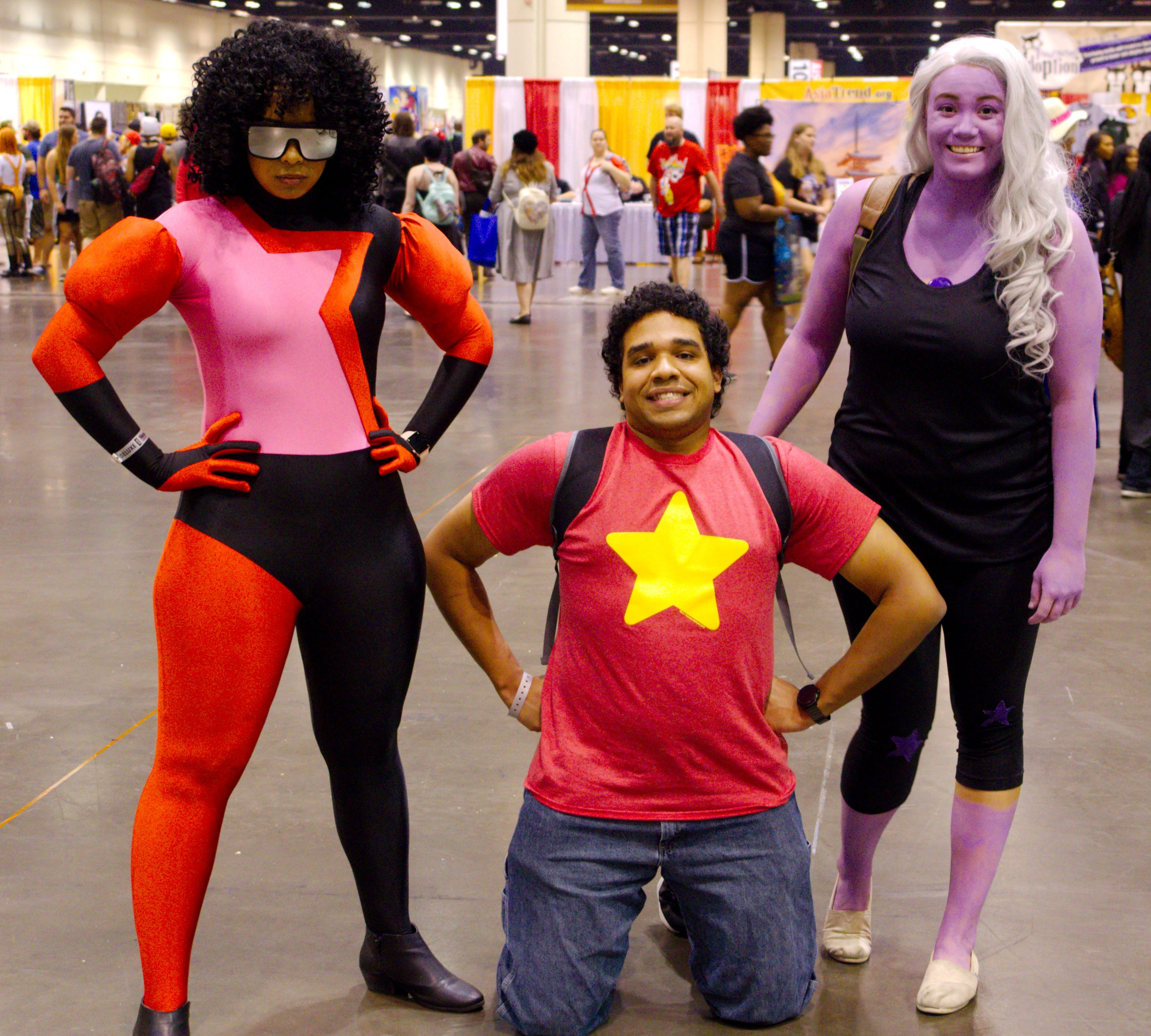
Cosplayers of Garnet, Steven Universe, and Amethyst at MegaCon 2018. Garnet and Amethyst are non-binary Gem women in Steven Universe, Steven Universe Future, and Steven Universe: The Movie.

This is a list of non-binary characters in animation that either self-identify as non-binary (i.e. genderqueer) or have been identified by outside parties to be of the non-binary gender, agender, bigender, genderfluid, genderqueer, as well as characters of any third gender. Listed characters are either recurring characters, cameos, guest stars, or one-off characters in animated series, but not animated films. This article also includes characters in Japanese animation, otherwise known as anime.

For fictional characters in other parts of the LGBTQ community, see the lists of gay, trans, lesbian, bisexual, pansexual, asexual, and intersex characters.

The names are organized alphabetically by surname (i.e. last name), or by a single name if the character does not have a surname. If more than two characters are in one entry, the last name of the first character is used. These characters are organized by their identities within the non-binary umbrella of identities, rather than by years, as corresponding lists of lesbian, bisexual and gay animated characters, do.

== Non-binary and genderqueer ==
| Character | Show title | Portrayed by | Duration | Notes |
|---|---|---|---|---|
| Admiral Akers | The Bravest Knight | Asia Kate Dillon | 2019–present | A seafaring character who appears in the episode "Cedric & Pirate Cove" and corrects another character when they assume the wrong pronouns, saying "I don’t go by ‘he;’ I go by they. Some are ‘he’ and some are ‘she,’ but neither one will do for me." |
| Alex | Primos | Blu del Barrio | 2024 | Alex is a non-binary person (voiced by non-binary actor Blu del Barrio). who is dating Lita Perez, who is Tater's eldest cousin and is bisexual. The episode Alex and Lita appeared in was nominated for a GLAAD Media Award for Outstanding Kids & Family Programming or Film – Animated. |
| Ryuji "Yuka" Ayukawa | Blue Period | Yumiri Hanamori | 2021 | Yuka is one of Yatora Yaguchi's friends. They wear both male and female school uniforms. In the anime, they are the source of mockery of other students who misgender and deadnamed them, while in the manga no one seems to pay them any mind. Yuka is popular in class, called "Yuka-chan" by some, and is on good terms with Yaguchi. |
| D'eon de Beaumont/Lia de Beaumont | Le Chevalier D'Eon | Yūki Tai | 2006–2007 | Lia de Beaumont is killed and her brother D'eon de Beaumont seeks her murderers, and her spirit begins to inhabit his body whenever his life is in danger. This character is based on the identity that real-life cross-dresser, Chevalier d'Eon claimed in a 1756 mission to Russia. |
| D'eon de Beaumont/Lia de Beaumont | Le Chevalier D'Eon | Akio Nojima | 2006–2007 | Lia de Beaumont is killed and her brother D'eon de Beaumont seeks her murderers, and her spirit begins to inhabit his body whenever his life is in danger. This character is based on the identity that real-life cross-dresser, Chevalier d'Eon claimed in a 1756 mission to Russia. |
| D'eon de Beaumont/Lia de Beaumont | Le Chevalier D'Eon | Risa Mizuno | 2006–2007 | Lia de Beaumont is killed and her brother D'eon de Beaumont seeks her murderers, and her spirit begins to inhabit his body whenever his life is in danger. This character is based on the identity that real-life cross-dresser, Chevalier d'Eon claimed in a 1756 mission to Russia. |
| Asher Berdacs | Kipo and the Age of Wonderbeasts | River Butcher | 2020 | When asked by a fan about the gender of Asher, series creator "Rad" Sechrist said that Asher is non-binary and uses singular they pronouns, which was later confirmed by Bill Wolkoff, co-screenwriter of Kipo. Asher is voiced by non-binary actor River Butcher. |
| Blaine | Adventure Time: Distant Lands (Note: Adventure Time: Fionna and Cake (cameo)) | Bex Taylor-Klaus | 2023 | Blaine is a young cyclops and a classmate of the character Peppermint Butler. Blaine is referred to with the singular they pronoun in the episode "Distant Lands". Moreover, the official Adventure Time Tumblr account posted concept art of Blaine, including notes referring to them with such language. |
| Box | We Baby Bears | Amari McCoy | 2022–present | Box, the Bears' friend is non-binary and uses they/them pronouns. |
| Courtney Cahatel | Dead End: Paranormal Park | Emily Osment | 2022 | Series creator Hamish Steele said that Courtney is not "aware of gender in any way" and cannot be misgendered, noting that all pronouns were used in production. He added that he uses they/them for Courtney, but that Netflix persuaded them to use the pronouns of the person cast for Courtney's voice role. Emily Osment was cast, so Courtney is referred to with she/her pronouns. |
| Double Trouble | She-Ra and the Princesses of Power | Jacob Tobia | 2018–2020 | Showrunner ND Stevenson described them at New York Comic Con 2019 as a "nonbinary shapeshifting mercenary". They are voiced by Jacob Tobia, a non-binary person. Double Trouble reappears for brief periods in the show's final season, posing as "Peekablue," a male prince. |
| Parker J. Cloud | Middlemost Post | Becky Robinson | 2021 | Parker J. Cloud is an anthropomorphic cloud who delivers mail. Parker is non-binary and uses they/them pronouns. Middlemost Post is the first Nickelodeon series to feature a non-binary lead protagonist. |
| Sonnie Dracula | Mighty MonsterWheelies | Cal Brady | 2024–present | A Dracula motorcycle/helicopter combo. Sonnie is non-binary and uses they/them pronouns. Sonnie Dracula is voiced by transgender actress Cal Brady. |
| Odee Elliott | Madagascar: A Little Wild | Iris Menas | 2021–2022 | An okapi, voiced by Iris Menas, who first appears in the season 3 Pride-themed episode "Whatever Floats Your Float," with none of the floats seeming right for Odee, and then sings a song titled "Be Proud" about being proud of your identity. GLAAD consulted on the episode and menas said the episode resonated with hir. |
| Envy | Fullmetal Alchemist | Mayumi Yamaguchi | 2003–2004 | Envy is a shapeshifting homunculus without a specific gender. While they are usually referred to in general neutral pronouns in the Japanese version, in both anime they are usually referred to as he, indicate in episodes like "Death". They are normally seen to have the appearance of an 'androgynous' female. |
| Envy | Fullmetal Alchemist: Brotherhood | Minami Takayama | 2009–2010 | Envy is a shapeshifting homunculus without a specific gender. While they are usually referred to in general neutral pronouns in the Japanese version, in both anime they are usually referred to as he, indicate in episodes like "Death". They are normally seen to have the appearance of an 'androgynous' female. |
| Fred | Ridley Jones | Iris Menas | 2021–2023 | Fred is a non-binary bison who prefers they/them pronouns and is the first non-binary character in a Netflix kids series. |
| Garnet | Steven Universe | Estelle | 2013–2020 | Ruby and Sapphire are two sexless but feminine-presenting members of the Crystal Gems who have a romantic relationship with each other, and stay permanently fused to form Garnet. In July 2015, the co-executive producer, Ian Jones-Quartey, has confirmed that, according to human standards and terminology, calling Ruby and Sapphire non-binary, feminine-presenting lesbians would be "a fair assessment". On July 6, 2018, the episode "Reunited" aired, in which Ruby and Sapphire get married, kiss, and fuse into Garnet, after Ruby proposed to Sapphire in a previous episode, "The Question". Series creator Rebecca Sugar has also said that "the Gems are all non-binary women," which includes Garnet, and her friends, Amethyst and Pearl. |
| Garnet | Steven Universe Future | Estelle | 2013–2020 | |
| Gregg | OK K.O.! Let's Be Heroes | Ian Jones-Quartey | 2017–2019 | Gregg is a minor character in the series, usually loitering around the plaza with Red Action and Drupe. Series creator Ian Jones-Quartey confirmed them as non-binary on Twitter. |
| Violet Harper (Halo) | Young Justice | Zehra Fazal | 2010–2022 | Violet Harper, also known as Halo, is the soul of a sentient technology known as a Mother Box that entered the body of Gabrielle Daou. In spite of Halo's outward appearance, the character does not identify as male or female as defined in Earth language. In the episode "Nautical Twilight", Halo self-identifies as non-binary, adding that the singular they pronoun suits them best, although they are unbothered by being called "she". Rocket and the New Gods used feminine pronouns for Halo in the episode "Forbidden Secrets of Civilizations Past!" though this was a writing mistake according to Greg Weisman. |
| Winn Harper | The Fairly OddParents: A New Wish | Iris Menas | 2024 | A cool, purple-haired elementary schooler fond of skateboarding, and one of Hazel Wells' friends. Winn is non-binary and uses they/them pronouns, with one character saying in the episode "Fly," "That's Winn. They're cool, you don't stand a chance." Winn is voiced by non-binary actor Iris Menas. |
| Hunter | Adventure Time: Fionna and Cake | Vico Ortiz | 2023-present | Hunter is one of Fionna Campbell's love interests and the gender-flipped counterpart of Huntress Wizard. In the season two episode "The Lion of Embers", Hunter shows their chest, which has top surgery scars. In a later episode "The Wolves Who Wandered", Hunter is confirmed to be non-binary and uses they/them pronouns. Hunter is voiced by non-binary and genderfluid actor and drag king Vico Ortiz, who also confirmed Hunter's gender identity on Instagram.[386][387] In the second season, Hunter's romantic advances are rejected by Fionna, who chooses to get close to her ex-boyfriend, DJ Flame, instead,[388][389][390] but later breaks up with him |
| Hyena | Give Me Three Tickets (Note: Also known as Dame Tres Tickets and 3 Tickets) | —N/a | 2020 | In this Chilean adult animation produced by Pájaro Estudio, which was presented at the Animation! section of the Argentine film festival, "Ventana Sur", there is a party-loving non-binary hyena, a posh albino giraffe, and monkey who is a liberal shaman, with all three sharing everything. This includes their "love lives". Things change when one of these characters tries to bring a new person into their relationship. |
| Emporio Ivankov | One Piece | Norio Imamura (Note: episodes 438–460) | 1999–present | Ivankov is the self-declared queen of an island populated by okama, having powers that allow him to shift between male and female forms, while also changing genders of other individuals. Also known as Iva, and has been involved in various battles with villains over the course of the show. |
| Emporio Ivankov | One Piece | Mitsuo Iwata (Note: Episode 461 onward) | 1999–present | Ivankov is the self-declared queen of an island populated by okama, having powers that allow him to shift between male and female forms, while also changing genders of other individuals. Also known as Iva, and has been involved in various battles with villains over the course of the show. |
| Jae | Supernatural Academy | Ali J. Eisner | 2022 | Jae is a Faerie student who goes to Supernatural Academy. They are non-binary and prefer they/them pronouns. Jae is voiced by transgender and non-binary actor Ali J. Eisner. |
| Kazi | The Dragon Prince | Ashleica Edmond | 2018–2024 | After the release of the third season, the official Dragon Prince Twitter account revealed that Kazi, the Sunfire Elf sign language interpreter, goes by they/them pronouns. |
| Mr. Bon Kurei | One Piece | Kazuki Yao | 1999–present | Also known as Bentham of the Wild and "Mr. 2 Bon Clay," he has powers that allows him to shapeshift into any form he wishes and crossdresses as a woman, and has a kempo called the "Okama Kempo". He is a recurring character, has defeated many villains, and was once an enemy of the Straw Hat Grand Fleet. He is part of "Baroque Works," and has been described as being "associated with queer gender identities." |
| Amber McKnight | Velma | Sara Ramirez | 2023–2024 | Amber is the child of Hex Girl Thorn. Amber uses they/them pronouns, and they are voiced by non-binary actor Sara Ramirez. |
| Marshmallow | The High Fructose Adventures of Annoying Orange | Dane Boedigheimer | 2012–2014 | Marshmallow is one of Annoying Orange's friends. On June 17, 2022, Marshmallow was confirmed to be non-binary. Marshmallow is voiced by creator Dane Boedigheimer, who is transgender and non-binary. |
| Morph | X-Men: The Animated Series | Rob Rubin | 1992–1997 | In X-Men: The Animated Series, Morph, a mutant member of the X-Men with the power of shapeshifting, was depicted as male. Conversely, X-Men '97 presents Morph as non-binary and preferring they/them pronouns. Morph also shows romantic interest in Wolverine and confesses their love towards him while taking on the form of Jean Grey, which was confirmed by showrunner Beau DeMayo. Morph is voiced by gay and non-binary voice actor J. P. Karliak. In the series itself, Morph is referred to with both they/them and he/him pronouns. |
| Morph | X-Men '97 | J. P. Karliak | 2024–present | |
| Nightshade | Transformers: EarthSpark | Z Infante | 2022–2025 | One of the new members of Terrans, Transformers born on Earth and ally of the Autobots and the Malto family who first appears in the two-part episode "Age of Evolution". Nightshade explains to Optimus Prime that they go by they/them pronouns, as "he or she just doesn't fit who [they are]". |
| Obsidian | Steven Universe | Various actors overlaid | 2013–2019 | A fusion of Steven Universe and fellow Crystal Gems Garnet, Amethyst and Pearl, Obsidian is based on the volcanic glass obsidian. Obsidian first appeared in the episode "Change Your Mind." They later were imagined in the episode "In Dreams," and shown in a flashback in "Growing Pains." Joe Johnson, a storyboard artist for the series, confirmed that Obsidian uses they/them and she/her pronouns. |
| Okamas | One Piece | —N/a | 1999–present | More than one person, but a whole group of individuals, and are named after the tricky and controversial Japanese word "okama". |
| Pirate Polly | We Baby Bears | Em Hagen | 2022–present | Polly is a parrot who is also a pirate captain. When Polly returns in the season 2 episode "Polly's New Crew", Polly has come out as non-binary and is now using they/them pronouns. Polly is voiced by series production coordinator Em Hagen, who is non-binary. |
| Puddle | Summer Camp Island | Ethan Maher | 2018–2023 | An alien who uses they/them pronouns. Their husband, Alien King, is the king of their planet. |
| Rainbow Quartz 2.0 | Steven Universe | Alastair James | 2013–2020 | A fusion of Steven Universe and fellow Crystal Gem Pearl, Rainbow Quartz 2.0 is based on the metal-coated crystal rainbow quartz. He debuts in "Change Your Mind" and reappears in "A Very Special Episode." Rainbow Quartz uses both they/them and he/him pronouns, the only fusion to use these pronouns together, as confirmed by Colin Howard, a character designer, former writer and storyboard artist for Steven Universe and Steven Universe Future. |
| Rainbow Quartz 2.0 | Steven Universe Future | Alastair James | 2013–2020 | A fusion of Steven Universe and fellow Crystal Gem Pearl, Rainbow Quartz 2.0 is based on the metal-coated crystal rainbow quartz. He debuts in "Change Your Mind" and reappears in "A Very Special Episode." Rainbow Quartz uses both they/them and he/him pronouns, the only fusion to use these pronouns together, as confirmed by Colin Howard, a character designer, former writer and storyboard artist for Steven Universe and Steven Universe Future. |
| River | Rubble & Crew | Chinag Ma | 2023–present | River is a non-binary skateboarder. River uses they/them pronouns, and they are voiced by non-binary actor Cihang Ma. |
| Trixie Roughouse | Epithet Erased | Oz Ryan | 2019 | Trixie was confirmed to be non-binary and uses she/her, he/him and they/them pronouns. |
| Rusty | Thomas the Tank Engine & Friends | Matt Wilkinson (Note: 2012–2020) | 1984–2021 | Rusty is an anthropomorphic narrow gauge diesel engine who works on the Skarloey Railway. Show developer Britt Allcroft had the intention of making Rusty a "gender-neutral" character, being neither male or female. Initially, beginning with the character's debut in series 4, dialogue and narration would avoid referring to Rusty with any gender specific pronouns. However, starting with the series 9 episode "Tuneful Toots", Rusty would instead be referred to with masculine pronouns. |
| Sailor Star Fighter (Kou Seiya) | Sailor Moon | Shiho Niiyama | 1992–1997 | In the 90s anime, the Sailor Starlights (Sailor Star Fighter, Sailor Star Maker, and Sailor Star Healer) were assigned female at birth, but transform to present as male and refer to themselves as males when not fighting, as shown in the episode, "Holy War in the Galaxy! Sailor Wars Legend." In a 1999 interview, Naoko Takeuchi, who wrote the Sailor Moon manga, said she had made them always girls in the manga, in the anime "they got turned into guys, and I wasn't very happy about it." |
| Sailor Star Healer (Kou Yaten) | Sailor Moon | Chika Sakamoto | 1992–1997 | In the 90s anime, the Sailor Starlights (Sailor Star Fighter, Sailor Star Maker, and Sailor Star Healer) were assigned female at birth, but transform to present as male and refer to themselves as males when not fighting, as shown in the episode, "Holy War in the Galaxy! Sailor Wars Legend." In a 1999 interview, Naoko Takeuchi, who wrote the Sailor Moon manga, said she had made them always girls in the manga, in the anime "they got turned into guys, and I wasn't very happy about it." |
| Sailor Star Maker (Kou Taiki) | Sailor Moon | Narumi Tsunoda | 1992–1997 | In the 90s anime, the Sailor Starlights (Sailor Star Fighter, Sailor Star Maker, and Sailor Star Healer) were assigned female at birth, but transform to present as male and refer to themselves as males when not fighting, as shown in the episode, "Holy War in the Galaxy! Sailor Wars Legend." In a 1999 interview, Naoko Takeuchi, who wrote the Sailor Moon manga, said she had made them always girls in the manga, in the anime "they got turned into guys, and I wasn't very happy about it." |
| Sailor Uranus (Haruka Tenoh) | Sailor Moon Crystal | Junko Minagawa | 2014–2016 | Haruka is referred to by her partner, Sailor Neptune, as "both male and female, but also neither", making Haruka the first character in the franchise to be referred to that way. She is also said to have an independent attitude and not care much for teamwork. She also reappears in the film, Sailor Moon Eternal, as does Neptune. |
| Natsuru Senō | Kämpfer | Marina Inoue | 2009 | Natsuru is a second-year student at Seitetsu High School and has a crush on Kaede Sakura, one of the school's beauties. At the start of the story, he discovers that he has transformed into a girl, and learns that he has been chosen to be a Kämpfer with Zauber, or magic, powers such as casting fireballs from the beginning of the series. As a girl, he has longer hair styled in a ponytail. After a fight with Shizuku causes him to expose his Kämpfer form to other students of the school, Natsuru is enrolled as a girl of the same name at the school. Natsuru's female form becomes the subject of intense affection from Kaede Sakura, nearly the entire female student body, and the boys, including his male classmates. |
| Natsuru Senō | Kämpfer | Sabrina Owen | 2011 | |
| Shep (Note: All Gems in Steven Universe are non-binary, but Shep is the first character to be a non-binary human.) | Steven Universe Future | Indya Moore | 2020 | Shep is the partner of Sadie Miller, voiced by Indya Moore who is also non-binary, transgender, uses gender neutral they/them pronouns, and is a person of color. In their episode debut in "Little Graduation", Shep helped Steven work out his mental problems and come to his senses. |
| Smoky Quartz | Steven Universe | Natasha Lyonne | 2013–2020 | A fusion of Steven Universe, and fellow Crystal Gem, Amethyst, Smoky is based on the crystal smoky quartz. Steven and Amethyst first fused at a low point for both characters as noted by Michaela Dietz, the voice actress for Amethyst on the official Steven Universe podcast. Smoky debuted in the episode "Earthlings," and reappeared in three other episodes: "Know Your Fusion," "Change Your Mind", and "Guidance." Rebecca Sugar has stated that the Gems are "all non-binary women," with this applying to Amethyst specifically. On November 10, 2017, Cartoon Network posted a YouTube video of the character Peridot playing Steven Universe: Save the Light, in which she refers to Smoky with the singular they pronoun. |
| Smoky Quartz | Steven Universe Future | Natasha Lyonne | 2013–2020 | |
| Frankie Stein | Monster High | Iris Menas | 2022 | Frankie Stein is a monster who was created by scientists. Unlike the previous incarnations where Frankie was a cisgender woman and Frankenstein's monster and his bride's daughter, Frankie is a non-binary monster. In the series, and live-action movie, Frankie is non-binary and uses they/them pronouns. In the episode "Horoscare", they are revealed to have feelings for Cleo de Nile and Cleo is receptive towards them. Iris Menas, who voices Stein, is a non-binary actor. |
| Stevonnie | Steven Universe | AJ Michalka | 2013–2020 | Stevonnie is a fusion of both Steven and Connie. Steven and Connie identify as male and female respectively, but the gender of Stevonnie is difficult to describe, with series creator Rebecca Sugar describing it as the "living relationship between Steven and Connie." Stevonnie is commonly referred to with gender neutral pronouns (such as the singular they), while male and female characters seem to be physically attracted to Stevonnie. |
| Stevonnie | Steven Universe Future | AJ Michalka | 2013–2020 | Stevonnie is a fusion of both Steven and Connie. Steven and Connie identify as male and female respectively, but the gender of Stevonnie is difficult to describe, with series creator Rebecca Sugar describing it as the "living relationship between Steven and Connie." Stevonnie is commonly referred to with gender neutral pronouns (such as the singular they), while male and female characters seem to be physically attracted to Stevonnie. |
| Nathan Seymour (Fire Emblem) | Tiger & Bunny | Kenjiro Tsuda (Note: Japanese) | 2011 | Nathan is a highly effeminate homosexual man who identifies as genderqueer though he prefers to be identified as a woman at times, often spending more time with the female heroes while flirting with the male heroes. In the past, they tried to present themselves femininely but was harshly criticized, and they still hold a strong romantic infatuation towards men. |
| Nathan Seymour (Fire Emblem) | Tiger & Bunny | John Eric Bentley (Note: English) | 2011 | Nathan is a highly effeminate homosexual man who identifies as genderqueer though he prefers to be identified as a woman at times, often spending more time with the female heroes while flirting with the male heroes. In the past, they tried to present themselves femininely but was harshly criticized, and they still hold a strong romantic infatuation towards men. |
| Sunstone | Steven Universe | Shoniqua Shandai | 2013–2020 | A fusion of Steven Universe and fellow Crystal Gem Garnet, Sunstone is based on the mineral sunstone. Debuting in "Change Your Mind" and reappearing in "A Very Special Episode", Sunstone uses both singular they and feminine pronouns as confirmed on the official Steven Universe podcast, with Sunstone's pronouns also confirmed in this episode. |
| Sunstone | Steven Universe Future | Shoniqua Shandai | 2013–2020 | A fusion of Steven Universe and fellow Crystal Gem Garnet, Sunstone is based on the mineral sunstone. Debuting in "Change Your Mind" and reappearing in "A Very Special Episode", Sunstone uses both singular they and feminine pronouns as confirmed on the official Steven Universe podcast, with Sunstone's pronouns also confirmed in this episode. |
| Tai | Moon Girl and Devil Dinosaur | Ian Alexander | 2023–2025 | Tai is one of Lunella Lafayette's classmates. Tai is revealed to be non-binary in the episode "Check Yourself" as Tai is referred to with they/them pronouns by Lunella. In the unaired episode "The Gatekeeper", Tai is explicitly stated to be non-binary. Tai is voiced by non-binary actor Ian Alexander. |
| Yoshino Takatsuki | Wandering Son | Asami Seto | 2011 | A student in Shuichi's class, also known as Takatsuki-kun (高槻くん) by their classmates, is often seen as a girl, but wants to be a boy, often refraining from dressing in traditionally feminine clothes. He is attracted toward Shuichi and Saori, while he also experiences signs of gender dysphoria. |
| Tefé Holland | Harley Quinn | Vico Ortiz | 2019–present | In this series, Tefé Holland is non-binary and uses they/them pronouns. Tefé Holland is voiced by non-binary actor Vico Ortiz. |
| Terri | Amphibia | Kate Micucci | 2019–2022 | Terri is a scientist who helped Anne Boonchuy and the Plantars. In the show, they are feminine-presenting and was referred to as a woman by Anne. In the 2022 book Marcy's Journal: A Guide to Amphibia, Marcy uses gender-neutral pronouns for them. |
| Thomas | City of Ghosts | Blue Chapman | 2021 | Thomas is a 7-year-old child who goes by they/them pronouns. They are voiced by transgender child actor Blue Chapman. |
| Raine Whispers | The Owl House | Avi Roque | 2021–2023 | Raine is the head witch of the Bard Coven and uses they/them pronouns. They are Disney TVA's first non-binary character. The episode "Knock, Knock, Knockin' on Hooty's Door" reveals that Eda Clawthorne and Raine were formerly dating, before breaking up. |
| Raine Whispers | The Owl House | Blu del Barrio (Note: (young)) | 2021–2023 | Raine is the head witch of the Bard Coven and uses they/them pronouns. They are Disney TVA's first non-binary character. The episode "Knock, Knock, Knockin' on Hooty's Door" reveals that Eda Clawthorne and Raine were formerly dating, before breaking up. |
| Kiui Watase | Jellyfish Can't Swim in the Night | Miyu Tomita (Note: (Japanese)) | 2024 | In the 11th episode, she publicly expresses her gender fluidity, criticizing those who want her to behave in a "normal" manner, unashamed for embracing what she likes, and is supported by Yoru. She also is Mahiru's childhood friend and lends her talents to JELEE as its video editor and mixer. |
| Kiui Watase | Jellyfish Can't Swim in the Night | Molly Searcy (Note: (English)) | 2024 | In the 11th episode, she publicly expresses her gender fluidity, criticizing those who want her to behave in a "normal" manner, unashamed for embracing what she likes, and is supported by Yoru. She also is Mahiru's childhood friend and lends her talents to JELEE as its video editor and mixer. |
| Wren | Middle School Moguls | Tim Gunn | 2019 | One of the professors in the show, Mogul Wren, has been stated to be non-binary. They have a big role in the episode "Mo'gul Money, Mo Problems". |
| Wren | Pinecone & Pony | Ser Anzoategui | 2022–2023 | Wren is a non-binary person who prefers they/them pronouns, and is in a relationship with Gladys, the teacher for the Lil Rumblers. Wren is voiced by non-binary actor Ser Anzoategui. |
| Shion Zaiden | RWBY: Ice Queendom | Hiroki Nanami | 2022 | A nightmare hunter who captures Grimm who possess people in their dreams. Their presence in the series was praised by some reviewers. While the official Japanese website, refers to Shion with male pronouns, Rooster Teeth treats Shion as nonbinary. Christine Brent, Senior Brand Director for Rooster Teeth, described Shion as fantastic, "totally nonbinary", and unique to this series, while using they/them pronouns for Shion, and said she would like to have similar characters in future productions. |
| Zooble | The Amazing Digital Circus | Ashley Nichols | 2023–2026 | Zooble is one of the humans trapped within the titular Digital Circus, a virtual reality simulation. The character has been stated as being non-binary by series creator Gooseworx, and is exclusively referred to in the series with they\them pronouns. The character's discontent with their digital avatar had been interpreted as a reflection of gender dysphoria and body dysphoria. |

== Other identities under non-binary umbrella ==
=== Agender and genderless ===
| Character | Show title | Portrayed by | Identity | Duration | Notes |
|---|---|---|---|---|---|
| Dr. Azel | The Second Best Hospital in the Galaxy | Sam Smith | Genderless | 2024–present | Dr. Azel is Dr. Klak's on-again-off-again lover. Azel is a genderless alien who uses they/them pronouns. They are voiced by non-binary singer and songwriter Sam Smith. In the second season, Azel and Klak break up. |
| Bobo | OK K.O.! Let's Be Heroes | —N/a | Agender | 2017–2019 | On Twitter, Ian Jones-Quartey confirmed that Bobo is agender. |
| Angel Jose | Craig of the Creek | Angel Lorenzana | Agender | 2018–2025 | One of the characters, Angel, is non-binary and uses they/them pronouns. They were originally voiced by Angel Lorenzana, a storyboard artist and writer for the series who identifies as agender and uses the same pronouns. From seasons 4 to 6, they are voiced by queer transgender actress Miss Benny. |
| Angel Jose | Craig of the Creek | Miss Benny | Agender | 2018–2025 | One of the characters, Angel, is non-binary and uses they/them pronouns. They were originally voiced by Angel Lorenzana, a storyboard artist and writer for the series who identifies as agender and uses the same pronouns. From seasons 4 to 6, they are voiced by queer transgender actress Miss Benny. |
| Milo | Danger & Eggs | Tyler Ford | Agender | 2017 | In the fifth episode, the two protagonists, DD Danger and Phillip, meet Milo, who uses they/them pronouns. In the following episode, they form a band with DD and Philip named the Buck Buck Trio and play a music festival together. Tyler Ford, an agender model and speaker is the voice of Milo, said they loved that their character, is an "accurate representation" of them. |
| Supreme Kai | Dragon Ball Daima | Nia Celeste (Note: (English)) | Genderless | 2024 | In Dragon Ball Daima, it is revealed that the Kais, specifically the Supreme Kai, are part of the Glind race, which is genderless. |
| Supreme Kai | Dragon Ball Daima | Yumiko Kobayashi (Note: (Japanese)) | Genderless | 2024 | In Dragon Ball Daima, it is revealed that the Kais, specifically the Supreme Kai, are part of the Glind race, which is genderless. |
| Korvotron "Korvo" Opposites | Solar Opposites | Justin Roiland (Note: (seasons 1–3)) | Genderless | 2020–2025 | Korvo is an intelligent alien scientist who hates Earth and wants to leave as soon as possible. In March 2021, series creators Justin Roiland and Mike McMahan confirmed that Korvo and Terry are a romantic couple in a committed relationship. In the Valentine's Day special "An Earth Shatteringly Romantic Solar Valentine's Day Opposites Special", Korvo and Terry get married. |
| Korvotron "Korvo" Opposites | Solar Opposites | Dan Stevens (Note: (season 4–present)) | Genderless | 2020–2025 | Korvo is an intelligent alien scientist who hates Earth and wants to leave as soon as possible. In March 2021, series creators Justin Roiland and Mike McMahan confirmed that Korvo and Terry are a romantic couple in a committed relationship. In the Valentine's Day special "An Earth Shatteringly Romantic Solar Valentine's Day Opposites Special", Korvo and Terry get married. |
| Terrance "Terry" Opposites | Solar Opposites | Thomas Middleditch | Genderless | 2020–2025 | Evacuation partner of Korvo and a Pupa specialist who is fascinated with human culture. In a romantic relationship with Korvo as confirmed by series creators Justin Roiland and Mike McMahan. Later, Terry marries Korvo in the Valentines Day special "An Earth Shatteringly Romantic Solar Valentine's Day Opposites Special", Korvo and Terry get married. |
| Zero | Star Trek: Prodigy | Angus Imrie | Genderless | 2021–2022 | Zero is a Medusan. Medusans are genderless aliens who prefer they/them pronouns. |
| Zoit | Lloyd in Space | Pamela Adlon | Agender | 2002 | Zoit is a Padillikon, whose species is neither boy or girl until their 13th birthday, and appears in the episode "Neither Boy Nor Girl," declaring it no one's business what gender they are. |

=== Genderfluid ===
| Character | Show title | Portrayed by | Duration | Notes |
|---|---|---|---|---|
| BMO | Adventure Time | Niki Yang | 2010–2023 | BMO is a fun-loving, childlike, sentient game console. BMO is also genderfluid, with characters using masculine and feminine pronouns interchangeably to refer to him. In the series, both the pronoun "he" and the term "m'lady" have been used in reference to BMO. While BMO is an object used for recreation by Finn and Jake, BMO is still considered a close friend and treated as an equal by the two. They have appeared in Adventure Time: Distant Lands and Adventure Time: Fionna and Cake. |
| Iena Madaraba | Seton Academy: Join the Pack! | Minami Tsuda | 2020 | Iena Madaraba, also known as Yena or Hyena, is a spotted hyena confused about her true gender and sexuality. Even after her real gender is proven, Hitomi reassures Iena to just be the tomboyish she wants. In the future, Iena is a martial artist. After failing to feel feminine in various episodes, she claims out that she will still be a male inside in episodes such as "The Wild Habits of a Troubled Animal". Anime writer Paul Chapman described Iena as a "gender-ambiguous hyena person." |
| Tribore Menendez | Final Space | Olan Rogers | 2018–2021 | An alien who is leader of The Resistance. His species flips gender twice a year. Series creator Olan Rogers described Tribore as "narcissi-sexual" because he "loves himself a little too much." |
| Val/entina Romanyszyn | Gen:Lock | Asia Kate Dillon | 2019–2021 | In the episode "Training Daze", Val mentioned that they are genderfluid, going by the name "Val" when male-presenting and "Valentina" when female-presenting. In the episode "Together. Together," Val is revealed to be pansexual. Austin Chronicle reported that the character was written as genderfluid, but is feminine-presenting, altering their gender performance several times. |

=== Gender ambiguity ===
| Character | Show title | Portrayed by | Duration | Notes |
|---|---|---|---|---|
| Homura Akemi | Puella Magi Madoka Magica | Chiwa Saitō | 2011 | She explores, with Madoka Kaname, love and magical girls, with some saying her powers are not merely a "metaphor for love between magical girls", but "literally are the love between magical girls" and that Madoka's actions create a world "where love between women can prosper free from Kyubey's policing." However, when asked if Homura is in love with Madoka, Gen Urobuchi replied, "probably", saying that it is "a really strong friendship turns into a lovelike-relationship without the sexual attraction". |
| Dahlia Carpenter | Carole & Tuesday | Kenyu Horiuchi | 2019 | Agent and parent of 16-year-old Angela, a famous model. Dahlia is of indeterminate gender due to the influence of the Martian environment as shown in the fifth episode. |
| Desmond | Carole & Tuesday | Kōichi Yamadera | 2019 | Desmond is a highly respected and solitary artist who is androgynous. They were "originally a man but [is] turning into a woman," feeling emotionally as a man and woman at the same time. |
| Desmond | Carole & Tuesday | Marker Starling | 2019 | Desmond is a highly respected and solitary artist who is androgynous. They were "originally a man but [is] turning into a woman," feeling emotionally as a man and woman at the same time. |
| Zoë Hange | Attack on Titan | Romi Park (Note: (Japanese)) | 2013–2023 | Hange Zoë is a Section Commander of the Scouting Regiment who serves as its veteran leader of 4th Squad and a scientist who studies the Titans. In the original English translation of the original manga, Hange is referred to as a female, and is also portrayed as one in the anime adaptation. However, in a blog post in 2011, Isayama responded to a question regarding Hange's gender, saying, "Perhaps [Hange's gender] is better left unstated". In 2014, Kodansha USA stated they went back through volume 5 and removed gender-specific pronouns they had used for reprint, and references from volume 6 onwards. |
| Zoë Hange | Attack on Titan | Jessica Calvello (Note: (English)) | 2013–2023 | |
| Hajime Ichinose | Gatchaman Crowds | Maaya Uchida | 2013 | Hajime, one of the Gatchamen, fused with Berg Katze, who is an androgynous alien shapeshifter with no specified gender; Hajime's gender may be ambiguous, although still clearly a teenage girl, as shown in the episode "inbound". In various episodes, Hajime has Katze speak through her even when not in her Gatchaman form, even asking for their thoughts on Rizumu Suzuki, the show's villain in the first season of the series, and for their thoughts on other matters as shown in the episode "2:6:2". |
| Inugami | Gugure! Kokkuri-san | Takahiro Sakurai | 2014 | Inugami is a dog spirit who adores Kohina as she was the only one to care for them when they were alive. Because they cannot remember which gender they originally were, they frequently switch genders, and it becomes a running gag in the series. |
| Inugami | Gugure! Kokkuri-san | Chiwa Saitō | 2014 | Inugami is a dog spirit who adores Kohina as she was the only one to care for them when they were alive. Because they cannot remember which gender they originally were, they frequently switch genders, and it becomes a running gag in the series. |
| Madoka Kaname | Puella Magi Madoka Magica | Aoi Yūki | 2011 | In the series, Madoka and Homura explore love and magical girls, with some saying Madoka's actions create a world "where love between women can prosper free from Kyubey's policing". Akiyuki Shinbo stated that, in the Rebellion film, Homura's love for Madoka is greater than romance—a feeling of friendship. These comments imply that they are drawn to each other in an aromantic way, with platonic love, and may be asexual. |
| Berg Katze | Gatchaman Crowds | Mamoru Miyano | 2013 | Berg is an androgynous alien shapeshifter with no specified gender, although referred to in official releases as male. They have the power to transform into anyone that they kiss, preferring men over women, disguising themselves to frame people for all types of crimes, shown in episodes like "Genuine". At the end of the series, she goes on a number of dates with Hajime Ichinose, one of the Gatchamen, and in the director's cut she fuses with Haijame during a fight, indicated in the OVA, "Embrace". |
| Zezé Maria | Fudêncio e Seus Amigos | Cacá Marcondes | 2005–2011 | Zezé Maria is one of the students at the school, with their name roughly translated into "Joe-Joe Mary". (Note: In Portuguese, "Zezé" is a reduplication of "Zé", a familiar form of "José", which is equivalent to English "Joseph", and "Maria" is equivalent to English "Mary". "Zezé Maria" is a normal masculine name, as it is not unknown for men in Portuguese-speaking countries to be called José Maria or Zé Maria. However, José is a masculine name and Maria is a feminine name, hinting at the character's gender ambiguity. Additionally, in Portuguese, Zezé Maria is referred to by pronouns ele ("he") and ela ("she"), as well as articles o (masculine "the") and a (feminine "the").) Zezé has the appearance of a witty little girl with a manly voice, often referred to using pronouns and articles of either gender, regarded by friends as a 'trans girl.' Zezé is shown to be attracted to men in one episode as shown in the episode "Zezé's Girlfriend." In another episode, "Gay!!", all the students become temporarily gay except Conrado, and Zezé Maria calls herself a lesbian, but Funérea rejects her on the grounds that she became a lesbian too and does not think of Zezé as a girl. |
| Zezé Maria | Fudêncio e Seus Amigos | Ieié Marcondes | 2005–2011 | |
| O.D. | Gatchaman Crowds | Daisuke Hosomi | 2013 | O.D. is a flamboyant alien with no specific gender. They are later a guest on The Millione Show and replaced by DD. |
| Lieutenant Oscar | Lupin the Third: The Woman Called Fujiko Mine | Yūki Kaji | 2012 | Oscar is an androgynous male character who has a key role in the anime. |
| Najimi Osana | Komi Can't Communicate | Rie Murakawa | 2021–2022 | Described as having an ambiguous/unknown gender by official Japanese website. Najimi is a friend of the main characters, and has a habit of switching their gender, wearing a school uniform with a skirt and a tie. |
| Princess Sapphire | Princess Knight | Toma Yumi | 1967–1968 | Princess Sapphire is raised as a boy by her father since women are not eligible to inherit the throne. In addition, she is born with both a male and female heart but refuses to give up her boy heart as she needs it to vanquish evil. Nonetheless, she falls in love with and marries Prince Frank. |
| Ranma Saotome | Ranma ½ | Kappei Yamaguchi | 1989 | Ranma, the male protagonist, is a "guy who transforms into a girl...from a woman into a man," and is attracted to Akane Tendo. However, it is unclear whether this is confirmation she is a trans man, trans woman or something else. Rumiko Takahashi said in November 1992 that she decided on "the character being half man and half woman". (Note: Kappa was an Italian magazine published by Star Comics from July 1992 to November 2006, having 173 issues. Takahashi in the Ranma ½ Memorial Book/The Art of Ranma, talked about how she came up with the idea of Ranma transforming, adding that Ranma could be a male or female name.) |
| Ranma Saotome | Ranma ½ | Megumi Hayashibara | 1989 | Ranma, the male protagonist, is a "guy who transforms into a girl...from a woman into a man," and is attracted to Akane Tendo. However, it is unclear whether this is confirmation she is a trans man, trans woman or something else. Rumiko Takahashi said in November 1992 that she decided on "the character being half man and half woman". |
| Yamato | One Piece | Saori Hayami | 1999–present | He idolized Kozuki Oden as a child, emulating everything about the samurai warrior, and his pronouns are respected by Kozuki. He has also been described as a "rebellious son of a pirate emperor," and noted as a fan-favorite character. |
| Kamanosuke Yuri | Brave 10 | Motoki Takagi | 2012 | Kamanosuke's exact gender is unknown, but on occasion is referenced as male, shown in the episode "Valley of Whirlwinds". Nonetheless, they develop a romantic interest in Saizo. |

=== Additional characters ===
| Character | Show title | Portrayed by | Identity | Duration | Notes |
|---|---|---|---|---|---|
| Yū Asuka | Stars Align | Yoshitaka Yamaya | Gender non-conforming and Non-binary | 2019 | Yū, formerly known as Yuta, is a kind and mild-mannered person, who Touma thinks of as nice, even though he is unaware Yu has a crush on them, as noted in the second episode. In one episode, Yu revealed that they wear women's clothing, not sure of whether they are "binary trans, x-gender, or something else entirely" and are still figuring out their gender identity, despite their mother's angry declaration that Yu is "a boy" and her "son". |
| Brother Ken | bro'Town | David Fane | Fa'afafine | 2004–2009 | Brother Ken is the principal of the school and is fa'afafine. Because the concept does not readily translatable and complex, when the series was broadcast on Adult Swim Latin America, a decision was made not to translate Samoan words and just present them as part of the "cultural journey". |
| Kino | Kino's Journey | Ai Maeda | Transmasculine nonbinary | 2003 | Kino is a traveler who goes to "unknown mystical places" with a talking motorcycle named Hermes. Kino was assigned female at birth, but has an "androgynous persona", alternating between using feminine and masculine pronouns, while resisting those that attempt to pin a gender on them as a "girl" or "boy". While the show's official website, described Kino as a "young man", the series creator, Keiichi Sigsawa, said in September 2017, "Kino really doesn't think of herself too deeply when she uses pronouns. Depending on the circumstances, she may use 'boku' or 'atashi', it kinda depends on the situation she finds herself in," adding that it was not he "wanted to write a story about a girl who lives like a boy directly, [but] it was just an interesting way to start the story, and her character's personality has continued that way since then". As such, some reviewers even described Kino as one of the "rare transmasculine anime protagonists." |
| Izana Shinatose | Knights of Sidonia | Aki Toyosaki | Third gender | 2014–2015 | Izana belongs to a new, non-binary third gender that originated during the hundreds of years of human emigration into space, as first shown in the episode "Commencement". Izana later turns into a girl after falling in love with Nagate Tanasake. |

== See also ==
- List of animated series with LGBTQ characters
- List of non-binary people
- Non-binary characters in fiction – Representation of non-binary genders in fiction
- List of fictional non-binary characters
