= LGBTQ characters =

LGBTQ characters are fictional characters that are identified as LGBTQ.

LGBTQ characters may refer to:

== Animated ==
- List of animated films with LGBTQ characters
- List of animated series with LGBTQ characters
- List of animated series with LGBTQ characters: 1990–1999
- List of animated series with LGBTQ characters: 2000–2004
- List of animated series with LGBTQ characters: 2005–2009
- List of animated series with LGBTQ characters: 2010–2014
- List of animated series with LGBTQ characters: 2015–2019
- List of animated series with LGBTQ characters: 2020–2024
- List of animated series with LGBTQ characters: 2020–present

== Dramatic television series ==
- List of dramatic television series with LGBT characters
- List of dramatic television series with LGBTQ characters: 1960s–2000s
- List of dramatic television series with LGBTQ characters: 2010–2015
- List of dramatic television series with LGBTQ characters: 2016–2019
- List of dramatic television series with LGBTQ characters: 2020s

== Miscellaneous ==
- Lists of feature films with LGBTQ characters
- List of graphic art works with LGBTQ characters
- List of LGBTQ characters in modern written fiction
- List of LGBTQ characters in soap operas
- Lists of television programs with LGBTQ characters
- List of video games with LGBTQ characters
- List of video games with LGBTQ characters: 2010s
- List of video games with LGBTQ characters: 2020s
- List of webcomics with LGBTQ characters
