= List of animated series with LGBTQ characters: 2020–2024 =

The depiction of LGBTQ characters in animated series in the 2020s changed from the 2010s, accelerating, especially when it came to Western animation. In Western animation this included series such as The Owl House (2020–2023), Kipo and the Age of Wonderbeasts (2020), Helluva Boss (2020–present), Star Trek: Lower Decks (2020–2024), Adventure Time: Distant Lands (2020–2021), High Guardian Spice (2021), Arcane (2021–2024), The Legend of Vox Machina (2022–present), Dead End: Paranormal Park (2022), Scott Pilgrim Takes Off (2023), and Hazbin Hotel (2024–present).

In anime, LGBTQ characters appeared in various productions, including Adachi and Shimamura (2020), Otherside Picnic (2021), The Executioner and Her Way of Life (2022), Mobile Suit Gundam: The Witch from Mercury (2022–2023), The Magical Revolution of the Reincarnated Princess and the Genius Young Lady (2023),, I'm in Love with the Villainess (2023), Cherry Magic! Thirty Years of Virginity Can Make You a Wizard?! (2024), and Whisper Me a Love Song (2024).

This list only includes recurring characters, otherwise known as supporting characters, which appear frequently from time to time during the series' run, often playing major roles in more than one episode, and those in the main cast are listed below. LGBTQ characters which are guest stars or one-off characters are listed on the pages focusing exclusively on gay, lesbian, non-binary, and bisexual animated characters, and on pages listing fictional trans, pansexual, asexual, and intersex characters.

The entries on this page are organized alphanumerically by duration dates and then alphabetically by the first letter of a specific series.

== 2020 ==
Duration	Show title	Character debut date	Characters	Identity	Notes	Country
2020	Adachi and Shimamura	October 9, 2020	Sakura Adachi	Lesbian	Adachi wishes she was closer with her friend, Shimamura, even dreaming of kissing her, after they meet in the second floor of the gymnasium.	Japan
2020	Adachi and Shimamura	October 9, 2020	Hougetsu Shimamura	Lesbian	She falls in love with Sakura Adachi, her best friend, as their relationship moves forward, even with small steps.	Japan
2020	Adachi and Shimamura	October 9, 2020	Akira Hino	Lesbian	While she calls Taeko Nagafuji her "good friend," they clearly have feelings for each other, and their relationship develops over the course of the anime. Their intimate time together prompts Adachi to sleep over at Shimamura's house.	Japan
2020	Adachi and Shimamura	October 9, 2020	Taeko Nagafuji	Lesbian	She has feelings for her friend, Akira Hino, and a developing relationship over the course of the series.	Japan
2020	Crossing Swords	June 12, 2020	Ruben	Gay	Ruben is one of Patrick's brothers. In the first-season episode "The A-Moooo-Zing Race", he is revealed to be gay. Throughout the second season, he pursues a relationship with Holden.	United States
2020	Crossing Swords	June 12, 2020	Holden	Gay	Ruben is one of Patrick's brothers. In the first-season episode "The A-Moooo-Zing Race", he is revealed to be gay. Throughout the second season, he pursues a relationship with Holden.	United States
2020	Give Me Three Tickets (Note: Also known as Dame Tres Tickets and 3 Tickets)	2020	Hyena	Non-binary	In this Chilean adult animation produced by Pájaro Estudio, which was presented at the Animation! section of the Argentine film festival, "Ventana Sur" there is a party-loving non-binary hyena, an albino giraffe who is posh (and a lesbian) and monkey who is a liberal shaman, with all three sharing everything, including their "love lives," in a strange town. Things change when one of these characters tries to bring a new person into their relationship.	Chile
2020	Give Me Three Tickets	2020	Giraffe	Lesbian	In this Chilean adult animation produced by Pájaro Estudio, which was presented at the Animation! section of the Argentine film festival, "Ventana Sur" there is a party-loving non-binary hyena, an albino giraffe who is posh (and a lesbian) and monkey who is a liberal shaman, with all three sharing everything, including their "love lives," in a strange town. Things change when one of these characters tries to bring a new person into their relationship.	Chile
2020	Hoops	August 21, 2020	Scott	Gay	Scott is a gay boy on the school basketball team, who had been "the Colts' best player" before Matty came around.	United States
2020	Interspecies Reviewers	January 11, 2020	Crimvael	Intersex	A well-endowed intersex angel with a broken halo, Crimvael has male and female genitalia, as noted throughout the series. Despite his feminine appearance, he chooses to identify as male upon meeting Stunk and Zel in episode 1, to avoid them trying anything perverted on him. He is hinted to be bisexual in episode 3 and in episode 9, the narrator uses the pronoun "they" to refer to Crim. This is due to Crim having no set gender, much like the rest of the angels, and the narrator takes note on that.	Japan
2020	Interspecies Reviewers	January 11, 2020	Crimvael	Bisexual		Japan
2020	Kipo and the Age of Wonderbeasts	January 14, 2020	Benson Mekler	Gay	In the episode, "Ratland," after Kipo tells Benson that she likes him, he says that he does like her but in a platonic way and says the reason is because he is gay. In the episode "Beyond the Valley of the Dogs," he develops a crush on one of the boys who lives in the burrows named Troy. This is expanded in season 2, as in the episode "Paw of the Jaguar," Troy kisses Benson on the cheek, and in a later episode, "Heroes on Fire," a song about falling in love plays as they lock eyes, indicating he clearly has a crush on Troy. In season 3, Benson often referred to Troy as his boyfriend, and the two were seen still together at the end of "Age of Wonderbeasts". The series creator Radford "Rad" Sechrist hinted at Troy being pansexual, but it was never completely confirmed.	United States
2020	Kipo and the Age of Wonderbeasts	January 14, 2020	Troy Sandoval	Gay		United States
2020	Kipo and the Age of Wonderbeasts	June 12, 2020	Asher Berdacs	Non-binary	When asked by a fan about the gender of Asher, series creator "Rad" Sechrist said that Asher is non-binary and uses singular they pronouns, which was later confirmed by Bill Wolkoff, co-screenwriter of Kipo. Asher is voiced by non-binary actor River Butcher.	United States
2020	Magical Girl Friendship Squad	September 26, 2020	Daisy	Lesbian or bisexual	In this series, Daisy is unambiguously queer, sleeping with "every barista" at the local coffee shop. In the fourth episode, "Anti-Fungal Spit Skanks," Daisy's ex-girlfriend and classic-style anime character, Yolanda, is shown to be working at an urgent care center in the city. In response to a fan noting that in the episode "The Cool S," a sticker with the transgender pride flag is shown on Daisy's laptop, Hallie Cantor, a show writer, stated that they hadn't yet identified Daisy "as trans or cis," meaning that she could be a cisgender or trans lesbian. In another episode, "The Real World," Pansy calls herself Daisy's "monogamous live-in girlfriend", but only exists in the dimension created by Nut's sister, Gloriana. Later, show director Krystal Downs stated said that Daisy is lesbian. However, Anna Akana, who voiced Daisy, disagreed, stating that Daisy is a cisgender bisexual woman like herself, and dismissed comments by fans saying that Daisy was transgender, saying the implication was incorrect. In the pilot series, Magical Girl Friendship Squad: Origins, Daisy is a lesbian, sleeping with a woman in episode 2 ("Superparty").	United States
2020	Onyx Equinox	November 21, 2020	Yaotl	Bisexual	Yaotl is an emissary to the god Tezcatlipoca. His past as a human is shown in a flashback, where he takes part in numerous orgies involving both men and women. Mictēcacihuātl, the Queen of the Underworld, also partakes in one of these orgies. The two fall in love. Series creator Sofia Alexander confirmed Yaotl as bisexual and implied that Yun may be gay.	United States
2020	Onyx Equinox	November 21, 2020	Mictēcacihuātl	Bisexual	Yaotl is an emissary to the god Tezcatlipoca. His past as a human is shown in a flashback, where he takes part in numerous orgies involving both men and women. Mictēcacihuātl, the Queen of the Underworld, also partakes in one of these orgies. The two fall in love. Series creator Sofia Alexander confirmed Yaotl as bisexual and implied that Yun may be gay.	United States
2020	Rocky & Hudson: Os Caubóis Gays	August 10, 2020	Rocky	Gay	Rocky and Hudson are a gay cowboy couple. They are named after gay actor Rock Hudson.	Brazil
2020	Rocky & Hudson: Os Caubóis Gays	August 10, 2020	Hudson	Gay	Rocky and Hudson are a gay cowboy couple. They are named after gay actor Rock Hudson.	Brazil
2020	Seton Academy: Join the Pack!	February 18, 2020	Iena Madaraba	Genderfluid	Iena Madaraba, also known as Yena or Hyena, is a spotted hyena with female genitalia and is confused about her true gender & sexuality. Even after her real gender is proven, Hitomi reassures Iena to just be the tomboyish she wants. In the future, Iena is a martial artist. After failing to feel feminine in various episodes, she claims out that she will still be a male inside in episodes such as "The Wild Habits of a Troubled Animal". Anime writer Paul Chapman described Iena as a "gender-ambiguous hyena person."	Japan
2020	Seton Academy: Join the Pack!	February 18, 2020	Iena Madaraba	Intersex		Japan
2020	The Titan's Bride	July 6, 2020	Kōichi Mizuki	Gay	High school basketball player Kōichi Mizuki is suddenly summoned to a world populated by giants. He is met by Caius Lao Vistaille, the prince of the world, who immediately asks Kōichi to marry him.	Japan
2020	The Titan's Bride	July 6, 2020	Caius Lao Bistail	Gay	High school basketball player Kōichi Mizuki is suddenly summoned to a world populated by giants. He is met by Caius Lao Vistaille, the prince of the world, who immediately asks Kōichi to marry him.	Japan
2020–2021	Adventure Time: Distant Lands	November 19, 2020	Marceline Abadeer	Bisexual	In the episode "Obsidian," Marceline and Princess Bubblegum are living together in the Land of Ooo. At one point, Bubblegum calls Marceline her "vampire girlfriend" and Marceline says that Bubblegum is "good for" her, as they work out their relationship problems, remembering their previous trip to the Glass Kingdom and past breakup. This episode is a spin-off of the original Adventure Time series where Marceline was shown as a bisexual woman who dated a male wizard named Ash. Her voice actor, Olivia Olson, confirmed that Marceline and Bubblegum had once dated.	United States
2020–2021	Adventure Time: Distant Lands	November 19, 2020	Princess Bonnibel Bubblegum	Queer	Princess Bubblegum's sexuality has not been officially confirmed. Reviewers have argued that she is either bisexual, non-binary, queer, lesbian, or a combination of some of the latter, as both live in a world where "sexuality is somewhat fluid." In the series finale of Adventure Time, "Come Along with Me", Bubblegum and Marceline shared an on-screen kiss, confirming their relationship.	United States
2020–2021	Heaven Official's Blessing	October 31, 2020	Xie Lian	Gay	Xie Lian is a prince who ascends to Heaven upon his death but is banished twice due to his rule-bending behavior. Upon returning a third time as a laughingstock, he meets Hua Cheng, a demon who rules the ghost realm and leads a war against Heaven but had been nurturing feelings for Xie Lian for a long while. He flirts blatantly with a flustered Xie Lian, and the two live together as a couple.	China
2020–2021	Heaven Official's Blessing	October 31, 2020	Hua Cheng	Gay	Xie Lian is a prince who ascends to Heaven upon his death but is banished twice due to his rule-bending behavior. Upon returning a third time as a laughingstock, he meets Hua Cheng, a demon who rules the ghost realm and leads a war against Heaven but had been nurturing feelings for Xie Lian for a long while. He flirts blatantly with a flustered Xie Lian, and the two live together as a couple.	China
2020–2021	My Next Life as a Villainess: All Routes Lead to Doom!	April 11, 2020	Mary Hunt	Bisexual	She develops romantic feelings toward the series protagonist, Catarina, differing from the script of the otome game, Fortune Lover, beginning in episode 2 of the series, "A Prince Challenged Me To a Fight..." In episode 9, "Things Got Crazy at a Slumber Party...," Anne Shelley, Catarina's maid, observes that Mary loves Catarina so much that she concocted a "terrifying plan" of sorts to get them to stay together. In the same episode, Mary, in a sleepover with Catarina, Sophia, and Maria, admits she likes Catarina, saying she and someone she loved would trade dresses. Her fiancé is Alan.	Japan
2020–2021	My Next Life as a Villainess: All Routes Lead to Doom!	April 18, 2020	Sophia Ascart	Bisexual	In episode 8, when inside the book world, Sophia pins Catarina against a wall, confesses her love, and proposes they move in together. Although Catarina does not understand the ramifications of this confession, Maria and Mary, who also have crushes on Sophia, recognize it full well. In episode 9, "Things Got Crazy at a Slumber Party..." Anne Shelley observes that Sophia tries to get Catarina to realize that she has feelings for her, but to no avail. Sophia also seems to have feelings for men as well, and her brother is Nicol.	Japan
2020–2021	My Next Life as a Villainess: All Routes Lead to Doom!	April 25, 2020	Maria Campbell	Bisexual	When Catarina saves Maria from bullies, in the episode "I Enrolled in the Magic Academy...," she steals a romantic event from Gordo, causing Maria to begin falling love with Catarina in episode 4 of the series. In the following episode, Catarina steals a major romantic scene from Keith unintentionally, and they grow closer together. In a later episode, "Things Got Crazy at a Slumber Party...," Anne Shelley says that Maria shows her love for Catarina by sharing her sweets with her. In the episode "The Moment of My Doom Arrived... Part 1," Maria defends Catarina from false charges and says that Catarina means a lot to her. In the show's season 1 finale, Catarina asks her who she likes, and she says "the only one I love, admire, and want to be with for all time is you, Lady Catarina. So please allow me to stay by your side from now on." Maria likely has feelings for men as well, as her line she tells Catarina was supposed to be spoken to a man in the original game.	Japan
2020–2021	My Pride: The Series	February 16, 2020	Nothing	Lesbian	This series follows a "queer, disabled lioness" named Nothing who is trying to heal the world. The series creator, Madeleine Patton, stated that it is important to tell diverse stories, and notes that the story deals with "ableism, queerness, feminism, womanhood and also, of course, lions." The mate of Nothing is Hover, formerly named Longrun, as indicated in episode 7, "Hover," in September 2020. In the previous life of Nothing, she was named Kyoga, and had a crush on another lion named Karabi.	Canada
2020–2022	Jurassic World Camp Cretaceous	September 18, 2020	Yasmina "Yaz" Fadoula	Bisexual	In the fifth and final season episode "The Core" Yasmina reveals her feelings to Sammy and they both share a kiss. Yasmina has told that she likes both men and women. Yasmina is voiced by queer actress Kausar Mohammed. Yaz and Sammy also appear in the sequel series Jurassic World: Chaos Theory. In the Jurassic World: Chaos Theory episode "Boiling Over", Yaz and Sammy end their relationship.	United States
2020–2022	Jurassic World Camp Cretaceous	September 18, 2020	Sammy Gutierrez	Lesbian	In the fifth and final season episode "The Core" Yasmina reveals her feelings to Sammy and they both share a kiss. Yasmina has told that she likes both men and women. Yasmina is voiced by queer actress Kausar Mohammed. Yaz and Sammy also appear in the sequel series Jurassic World: Chaos Theory. In the Jurassic World: Chaos Theory episode "Boiling Over", Yaz and Sammy end their relationship.	United States
2020–2022	Madagascar: A Little Wild	May 27, 2021	Odee Elliott	Non-binary	An okapi, voiced by Iris Menas, who first appears in the season 3 Pride-themed episode "Whatever Floats Your Float," with none of the floats seeming right for Odee, and then sings a song titled "Be Proud" about being proud of your identity. GLAAD consulted on the episode and Menas said the episode resonated with hir.	United States
2020–2023	The Owl House	January 10, 2020	Luz Noceda	Bisexual	Luz Noceda, the main character of The Owl House has shown explicit interest in men and women. In the show's first season, she blushes at Nevareth, Edric, and Emira Blight. Dana Terrace, the show creator, tweeted about how she wanted to make a bisexual character. On September 2, during a Reddit AMA, Terrace confirmed that Luz is bisexual. She also stated that Luz is "oblivious to some things in front of her," including Amity's crush on her. That makes her the first bisexual lead character on a Disney Channel show. In the episode "Escaping Expulsion", Luz starts to have a crush on Amity, and in "Through the Looking Glass Ruins", Luz realizes that Amity is interested in her. In the episode "Knock, Knock, Knockin' on Hooty's Door", Luz and Amity officially become a couple. In the episode "Clouds on the Horizon", Luz and Amity kissed each other on the lips. It is the first same-sex kiss between main characters in a Disney animated series. The first special "Thanks to Them" had Luz come out to her mother.	United States
2020–2023	The Owl House	January 10, 2020	Eda Clawthorne	Queer	Eda Clawthorne is Luz's mentor. While she mentions having "ex-boyfriends" in the first episode Eda is also shown to have feelings for her old friend Raine Whispers, who is non-binary. The episode "Knock, Knock, Knockin' on Hooty's Door" reveals that Eda and Raine were formerly dating, before breaking up.	United States
2020–2023	The Owl House	January 24, 2020	Amity Blight	Lesbian	Initially serving as a rival to Luz Noceda, she warms up to her due to the latter's kind nature. Amity is a top student at Hexside, the same school Luz is attending, and is shown blushing or becoming bashful on multiple occasions whenever Luz displays any affectionate behavior towards her, suggesting that she might have a crush on Luz. Her implied sapphism is confirmed in the episode "Enchanting Grom Fright", where it is revealed that her biggest fear is getting rejected by someone who she planned to ask to the prom, and that person is revealed to be Luz. On September 2, during a Reddit AMA, Terrace confirmed that Amity is intended to be a lesbian. In the same AMA, Terrace stated that Luz was Amity's first crush. In the episode "Through the Looking Glass Ruins", Amity kisses Luz on the cheek. In the episode "Knock, Knock, Knockin' on Hooty's Door", Luz and Amity officially become a couple. In the episode "Clouds on the Horizon", Amity and Luz kissed each other on the lips. It is the first same-sex kiss between the main characters in a Disney animated series.	United States
2020–2023	The Owl House	January 24, 2020	Willow Park	Pansexual	Willow's pansexuality was revealed by series creator Dana Terrace during a livestream on April 28, 2023.	United States
2020–2023	The Owl House	February 7, 2020	Lilith Clawthorne	Aromantic asexual	Eda's older sister and former leader of the Emperor's Coven. In a charity livestream hosted by Dana Terrace on March 13, 2022, a specially produced audio, written by Terrace and recorded by Cissy Jones in character as Lilith, was played. In this audio, Lilith claims to have never felt romantic attraction towards anyone before. Later prompted by Jade King of TheGamer, Jones stated that her audio during the charity stream was "basically canon." Jones would make further allusion to Lilith's aromantic orientation over Twitter, before giving direct affirmation of the character's asexuality on March 18, over Instagram.	United States
2020–2023	The Owl House	August 1, 2020	Gilbert Park	Gay	The character Willow Park was first shown to have two fathers in the episode "Understanding Willow", seen in a flashback of them at a playground with their daughter. They are again seen parenting Willow in the episode "Escaping Expulsion". That they are both Willow's parents was confirmed by story artist for the show Cat Mitchell. Though unnamed onscreen, their names (Gilbert and Harvey) were revealed in tweets by storyboard artist Mike Austin and production associate Rebecca Bozza, with the latter identifying who was who.	United States
2020–2023	The Owl House	August 1, 2020	Harvey Park	Gay		United States
2020–2023	The Owl House	August 29, 2020	Hunter	Bisexual	Hunter's bisexuality was revealed by series creator Dana Terrace during a livestream on April 28, 2023.	United States
2020–2023	The Owl House	July 24, 2021	Raine Whispers	Non-binary	The head witch of the Bard Coven who uses they/them pronouns. Raine is Disney's first non-binary character, having been confirmed as non-binary by Avi Roque, who voices the character. Roque later made the additional statement that Raine is transgender and transmasculine. In a similar vein, art by series storyboarder King Pecora would depict the character with apparent top surgery scars. The teenage version of Raine Whispers is voiced by non-binary actor Blu del Barrio.	United States
2020–2023	The Owl House	July 24, 2021	Raine Whispers	Transmasculine	The head witch of the Bard Coven who uses they/them pronouns. Raine is Disney's first non-binary character, having been confirmed as non-binary by Avi Roque, who voices the character. Roque later made the additional statement that Raine is transgender and transmasculine. In a similar vein, art by series storyboarder King Pecora would depict the character with apparent top surgery scars. The teenage version of Raine Whispers is voiced by non-binary actor Blu del Barrio.	United States
2020–2024	Star Trek: Lower Decks	August 6, 2020	Beckett Mariner Freeman	Bisexual or pansexual	In the episode "We'll Always Have Tom Paris", Mariner stated that she has dated "bad boys, bad girls, bad gender non-binary babes, [and] ruthless alien masterminds", implying she was pansexual or bisexual. In the season one episode "No Small Parts", Mariner is shown to have previously dated crewmate Steve Levy. Later, during seasons two and three, Mariner is shown entering a relationship with her former rival, Andorian crewmate Jennifer Sh'reyan, though they later break up as shown in the episode "The Best Exotic Nanite Hotel". In an interview, series creator Mike McMahan also confirmed that Captain Amina Ramsey was Beckett Mariner's former lover at Starfleet Academy, even though it was not explicitly stated, saying that "every Starfleet officer is probably at the baseline bisexual" in a sense, and that they did not "intentionally mean for anybody to be strictly heteronormative or straight or cis."	United States
2020–2024	Star Trek: Lower Decks	August 20, 2020	Jennifer Sh'reyan	Bisexual or pansexual	An Andorian Starfleet officer serving aboard the USS Cerritos. She is shown entering a relationship with crewmate, and former rival, Beckett Mariner during the second and third seasons. However, they later break up. They eventually break up on their own equal terms before Jennifer transfers to the Manitoba.	United States
2020–2024	Star Trek: Lower Decks	September 17, 2020	Amina Ramsey	Lesbian	A Starfleet officer and captain of the USS Oakland. In early October 2020, the creator of Star Trek: Lower Decks, Mike McMahan, confirmed that Amina Ramsey was Beckett Mariner's former lover at Starfleet Academy, even though it was not explicit, stated that "every Starfleet officer is probably at the baseline bisexual" in a sense, and that they did not "intentionally mean for anybody to be strictly heteronormative or straight or cis."	United States
2020–2024	Star Trek: Lower Decks	December 12, 2024	Elim Garak	Queer	Alternate versions of Elim Garak and Julian Bashir who are in a same-sex relationship and they are also married. This is a nod to the Garak/Bashir slash pairing.	United States
2020–2024	Star Trek: Lower Decks	December 12, 2024	Julian Bashir	Queer	Alternate versions of Elim Garak and Julian Bashir who are in a same-sex relationship and they are also married. This is a nod to the Garak/Bashir slash pairing.	United States
2020–2025	Baby Shark's Big Show!	February 14, 2022	Viv and Vera	Lesbian	Viv and Vera are the mothers of Baby Shark's friend Vola. They first appeared in the episode "The Great Skate Case". They also appeared in the Mother's Day episode "Operation Happy Mommies". Viv is voiced by bisexual comedian and actress Sherry Cola.	United States
2020–2025	Baby Shark's Big Show!	February 14, 2022	Viv and Vera	Lesbian	Viv and Vera are the mothers of Baby Shark's friend Vola. They first appeared in the episode "The Great Skate Case". They also appeared in the Mother's Day episode "Operation Happy Mommies". Viv is voiced by bisexual comedian and actress Sherry Cola.	South Korea
2020–2025	Blood of Zeus	October 27, 2020	Apollo	Bisexual or pansexual	Apollo is a Greek god. In the episode "Escape or Die", he is shown sleeping with both a man and a woman.	United States
2020–2025	Solar Opposites	May 8, 2020	Korvo	Genderless	Korvo is an intelligent alien scientist who hates Earth and wants to leave as soon as possible, while Terry is his evacuation partner and a Pupa specialist who is fascinated with human culture. In March 2021, series creators Justin Roiland and Mike McMahan confirmed that both are a romantic couple in a committed relationship. In the Valentine's Day special "An Earth Shatteringly Romantic Solar Valentine's Day Opposites Special", Korvo and Terry get married.	United States
2020–2025	Solar Opposites	May 8, 2020	Terry	Genderless	Korvo is an intelligent alien scientist who hates Earth and wants to leave as soon as possible, while Terry is his evacuation partner and a Pupa specialist who is fascinated with human culture. In March 2021, series creators Justin Roiland and Mike McMahan confirmed that both are a romantic couple in a committed relationship. In the Valentine's Day special "An Earth Shatteringly Romantic Solar Valentine's Day Opposites Special", Korvo and Terry get married.	United States
2020–present	Helluva Boss	October 31, 2020 (Note: The pilot episode was released on November 25, 2019, but the series proper was released on October 31, 2020.)	Blitzo	Pansexual	Blitzo is the founder of I.M.P. (Immediate Murder Professionals) and is known for his relationship with Stolas, the Prince of Hell. In the episode "Truth Seekers," the two share a kiss. Blitzo is also seen stalking his employees, Moxxie and Millie, outside their workplace. According to his Instagram, Blitzo is pansexual. Blitzo is voiced by Brandon Rogers, a gay actor, comedian, and writer for the series.	United States
2020–present	Helluva Boss	October 31, 2020	Moxxie Knolastname	Bisexual	A demon and protagonist who is an assassin and weapons expert of I.M.P. In September 2020, on Bi Visibility Day, series creator Vivienne Medrano revealed he is bisexual on her Twitter account. In the episode "Exes and Oohs", it is revealed that Moxxie was in a same-sex relationship with a fausil named Chaz prior to marrying Millie. His wife had also previously dated Chaz.	United States
2020–present	Helluva Boss	October 31, 2020	Loona	Bisexual	Loona is a hellhound and Blitzo's adopted daughter. Merchandise shows Loona in bisexual pride colors. Loona is voiced by bisexual voice actor Erica Lindbeck.	United States
2020–present	Helluva Boss	October 31, 2020	Stolas	Gay	A prince of Hell, he is in a complicated relationship with Blitzo. Stolas has been interested in Blitzo since he was a child. It is also indicated Stolas never had an actual interest in women and only stay being married to Stella so he could give his daughter a normal and stable life. It was only until Octavia was old enough that Stolas could divorce his wife. In the third season, Stolas starts to lose romantic interest in Blitzo after becoming aware that his and Blitzo's relationship was an unequal power dynamic and getting kicked out of the Ars Goetia. He dumps Blitzo and starts getting back together with his friend Vassago.	United States
2020–present	Helluva Boss	December 9, 2020	Octavia	Asexual	Stolas' teenage emo scornful daughter. Merchandise for the series shows Octavia in asexual pride colors.	United States
2020–present	Helluva Boss	January 31, 2021	Verosika Mayday	Pansexual	A succubus pop star and Blitzo's ex-girlfriend from episode 3: "Spring Broken". In the episode "Apology Tour", it is revealed that the reason they broke up was because she told him she loved him and he left, causing her to hate him. Merchandise for the series shows Verosika in pansexual pride colors.	United States
2020–present	Helluva Boss	April 30, 2021	Sallie May Haymurder	Lesbian Trans woman	Millie's sister, from episode 5: "The Harvest Moon Festival". She is confirmed to be transgender by her voice actress, Morgana Ignis and a lesbian in merchandise, who is transgender and lesbian. In the third season, she is revealed to have a girlfriend named Willow Wackford, the sister of Wally Wackford.	United States
2020–present	Helluva Boss	October 31, 2021 (Note: Asmodeus and Fizzarolli were mentioned in an episode that was released on December 9, 2020.)	Asmodeus	Pansexual	Asmodeus is one of the Seven Deadly Sins, the Sin of Lust. He runs a nightclub with the jester imp Fizzarolli as his headliner. In episode 15: "Oops", it is revealed that Asmodeus and Fizzarolli are secretly lovers and have been in a genuine romantic relationship for years. Merchandise for the series shows Asmodeus in pansexual pride colors. In the tenth Helluva Boss short "Mission: It's Chaz Funeral", it is revealed Asmodeus was once in a relationship with Chazwick Thurman as he attended the funeral with an unhappy Fizzarolli.	United States
2020–present	Helluva Boss	October 31, 2021	Fizzarolli	Gay	Fizzarolli is a jester imp and Blitzo's childhood friend. Unlike Blitzo and Stolas' relationship; Asmodeus and Fizzarolli's relationship is more stable and healthy. Merchandise for the series shows Fizzarolli in gay male pride colors.	United States
2020–present	Helluva Boss	March 11, 2023	Chazwick Thurman	Pansexual	Chazwick Thurman is a Fausil, which are shark demons. He had previously both dated Moxxie and Millie. Chazwick was presumably killed by Moxxie's father. However, he was revealed to be alive in the tenth Helluva Boss short "Mission: It's Chaz Funeral" and is currently impersonating as his twin "Zahc Thurman". It is also revealed that he dated half of the supporting characters who attended his funeral.	United States
2020–present	Helluva Boss	May 20, 2023	Andrealphus	Gay	Stella's snobby brother and the ice peacock demon who made his debut in the episode "Western Energy". Merchandise for the series shows Andrealphus in gay male pride colors. In the tenth Helluva Boss short "Mission: It's Chaz Funeral", it is revealed that Andrealphus was once in a relationship with Chazwick Thurman as one of his many ex-lovers who went to his funeral.	United States
2020–present	Helluva Boss	June 24, 2023	Beelzebub	Pansexual	Beelzebub is one of the Seven Deadly Sins, the Sin of Gluttony and the girlfriend of Verosika's hellhound bodyguard, Vortex. Merchandise for the series shows Beelzebub in pansexual pride colors. She was originally voiced by singer Kesha, who is part of the LGBT community, for the first two seasons.	United States
2020–present	Helluva Boss	July 8, 2023	Barbie Wire	Pansexual	Blitzo's twin sister who makes her debut on episode: "Unhappy Campers" and the drug dealer who works with a human counselor named Jimmy. In the eleventh Helluva Boss short "Barbie's Bad Day", Barbie is revealed to be in a same-sex relationship with an imp named Kendra (voiced by lesbian actress Erica Luttrell). The two broke up in the third season episode "YES/NO" as Kendra kicked her out. Barbie then gets into a relationship with Striker. Merchandise for the series shows Barbie Wire in pansexual pride colors.	United States
2020–present	Helluva Boss	October 29, 2023	Mammon	Asexual	Mammon is one of the Seven Deadly Sins, the Sin of Greed. He is the abusive boss of Fizzarolli until he quits with the help of Asmodeus. Merchandise for the series shows Mammon in asexual pride colors.	United States
2020–present	Helluva Boss	November 29, 2024	Vassago	Gay	Vassago is a member of the Ars Goetia society. He is gay. In the third season episode "The Auction", it is revealed that Stolas and Vassago were in a relationship as teenagers, but Stolas ended it due to his then-upcoming marriage to Stella and not wanting to disappoint his family. They started to rekindle their relationship. He is voiced by queer actor Harvey Guillén.	

== 2021 ==
Duration	Show title	Character debut date	Characters	Identity	Notes	Country
2021	Blue Period	October 2, 2021	Yuka Ayukawa	Genderqueer	Yuka is one of Yatora Yaguchi's friends. They are the one who encouraged Yaguchi to join the art club. Yuka wears both male and female school uniforms. In the anime, they are the source of mockery of other students who misgender and deadnamed them, while in the manga no one seems to pay them any mind. Yuka is a popular person in class, called "Yuka-chan" by some, and is on good terms with Yaguchi.	Japan
2021	Blue Period	October 2, 2021	Yuka Ayukawa	Bisexual	Yuka is one of Yatora Yaguchi's friends. They are the one who encouraged Yaguchi to join the art club. Yuka wears both male and female school uniforms. In the anime, they are the source of mockery of other students who misgender and deadnamed them, while in the manga no one seems to pay them any mind. Yuka is a popular person in class, called "Yuka-chan" by some, and is on good terms with Yaguchi.	Japan
2021	City of Ghosts	March 5, 2021	Thomas	Non-binary	Thomas is a 7-year-old child who goes by they/them pronouns. They are voiced by transgender child actor Blue Chapman.	United States
2021	High Guardian Spice	October 26, 2021	Anise	Lesbian	Anise is Sage's cousin. She is married to an Elf woman named Aloe. Anise is voiced by lesbian actress Haviland Stillwell.	United States
2021	High Guardian Spice	October 26, 2021	Aloe	Lesbian	Anise is Sage's cousin. She is married to an Elf woman named Aloe. Anise is voiced by lesbian actress Haviland Stillwell.	United States
2021	High Guardian Spice	October 26, 2021	Professor Caraway	Trans man	Professor Caraway is a professor at the High Guardian Academy. In the third episode "Transformations", he is revealed to be a transgender man, and is voiced by the show's creator, Raye Rodriguez, who is a trans man.	United States
2021	High Guardian Spice	October 26, 2021	Snapdragon	Trans woman	Snapdragon is a snarky student, and friend of Amaryllis, with red hair who goes to the same academy. Throughout the series, Snap figures out who they are and Caraway helps them move toward gender transition. The voice actress for Snap, Julia Kaye, confirmed that Snap is a trans woman and that Rodriguez based aspects of the character on her. Rodriguez further confirmed that Snap is a trans woman.	United States
2021	M.O.D.O.K.	May 21, 2021	Melissa Tartleton	Bisexual	Melissa Tartleton is MODOK's 17-year-old daughter who shares her father's appearance. Melissa is a popular girl who wants to be a supervillain. She is also bisexual. While her sexuality is not remarked upon in the first season, it was planned to be explored in season 2 according to Melissa's voice actor Melissa Fumero.	United States
2021	M.O.D.O.K.	May 21, 2021	Gary Garoldson	Gay	Gary Garoldson is one of MODOK's employees who is very optimistic and loyal to the organization. He has a husband named Big Mike who works as a trucker, but his devotion to MODOK puts a strain on their marriage.	United States
2021	Otherside Picnic	January 4, 2021	Sorawo Kamikoshi	Lesbian	A sophomore at a university in Saitama Prefecture who becomes friends with Toriko Nishina and begins to develop feelings for her over the course of the series.	Japan
2021	Otherside Picnic	January 4, 2021	Toriko Nishina	Lesbian	A woman who searches the Otherside for her missing friend Satsuki, who appears to be a college student, and has long blond hair and is, in the opinion of Sorawo, "extremely beautiful". She has a tendency to isolate herself from others, and has no friends other than Sorawo and Satsuki, who was Toriko's tutor.	Japan
2021	Q-Force	September 2, 2021	Steve Maryweather	Gay	Also known as Agency Mary, Steve was formerly part of the American Intelligence Agency (AIA) before he came out as gay. He was sent to West Hollywood where he could "disappear into obscurity," but while there he assembled his own team of LGBTQ spies, consisting of a drag disguise master (Twink), a skilled mechanic (Deb), and a hacker (Stat), later working with a straight man named Agent Buck at the request of the AIA. He is voiced by Sean Hayes, a gay actor and the creator of the series.	United States
2021	Q-Force	September 2, 2021	Benji	Gay	He is a gay man who is the love interest of Mary and is often in danger due to his closeness to the Q-Force.	United States
2021	Q-Force	September 2, 2021	Deb	Lesbian	A mechanic and guru with gadgets, she has a wife, 16 rescue dogs, and pretends to work at a place called Pep Boys when not part of the Q-Force. She is voiced by lesbian actress Wanda Sykes.	United States
2021	Q-Force	September 2, 2021	Louisa Desk	Lesbian	Louisa is a lesbian and a former nemesis of Deb. She is voiced by a lesbian actress, Fortune Feimster.	United States
2021	Q-Force	September 2, 2021	Twink	Gay	Twink is a gay French Canadian who is a "Master of drag" and part of the Q-Force. Twink is voiced by gay comedian Matt Rogers.	United States
2021	Q-Force	September 2, 2021	Stat	Ambiguous	A transgender pansexual hacker who is part of the Q-Force. She is voiced by a transgender actress Patti Harrison.	United States
2021	Santa Inc.	December 2, 2021	Goldie	Bisexual	Goldie is one of Candy Smalls's two best friends. She's a member of Santa Claus' "B-Team".	United States
2021	Tear Along the Dotted Line	November 19, 2021	Sarah	Lesbian	Sarah is one of Zerocalcare's friends. She is in a same-sex relationship with a woman named Stella. Sarah is a regular character in Zerocalcare's works and her girlfriend's design resembled Sailor Uranus in the comics. Sarah also appeared in This World Can't Tear Me Down and My 2 Cents.	Italy
2021	Wonder Egg Priority	March 17, 2021	Kaoru Kurita	Trans man	Kaoru is a trans boy hatched from Momoe's egg. His jacket is designed with colors that replicate the transgender flag. Having been assigned female at birth and struggling with his gender identity, Kaoru went to his kendo club advisor for advice. In the 10th episode, Kaoru and Momoe reaffirm their gender identities, with Momoe defeating a monster named the Wonder Killer which misgenders Kaoru.	Japan
2021–2022	Chicago Party Aunt	September 17, 2021	Daniel	Gay	Animated adaptation of the Twitter account of the same name. Daniel is Diane Dubrowski's nephew. He foregoes going to Stanford University and spends a "Gap Year" instead. He had just realized that he is gay. In the second part, Daniel gets a boyfriend. Daniel is voiced by gay actor Rory O'Malley.	United States
2021–2022	Chicago Party Aunt	September 17, 2021	Gideon	Gay	Gideon is Diane's boss at Borough (formerly Chi City Sports Cuts and Clips). He has had failed relationships with men and his mother was unaware that he's gay until the episode "Halloweener Circle" when Diane outs him to his mother. Gideon is voiced by gay actor and drag queen RuPaul Charles.	United States
2021–2022	Fairfax	October 29, 2021	Derica	Lesbian	Derica is a lesbian African-American social justice activist. In season 2, she had a crush who rejected her. Derica is voiced by queer actress Kiersey Clemons.	United States
2021–2022	Kid Cosmic	February 2, 2021	Fry	Gay	Fry is a man who works at Mo's Oasis Cafe and is usually seen together with Hamburg. He obtains the light pink elasticity Cosmic Stone of Power in the second season, which gives the user the ability to stretch their body. On February 3, 2022, the creator of Kid Cosmic, Craig McCracken, confirmed Fry and Hamburg as a gay couple.	United States
2021–2022	Kid Cosmic	February 2, 2021	Hamburg	Gay	Hamburg, a guy who works at Mo's Oasis Cafe and is usually seen with Fry. He obtains the indigo multiple arms Cosmic Stone of Power in the second season. On February 3, 2022, the creator of Kid Cosmic, Craig McCracken, that Fry was Hamburg's boyfriend.	United States
2021–2022	Komi Can't Communicate	October 7, 2021	Najimi Osana	Ambiguous	One of the main characters with ambiguous gender, with the official anime website stating "she no longer knows her gender." While at high school, Naijimi dresses in girls' uniform, albeit with a boy's tie. Najimi's gender is never confirmed and they are frequently referred to with gendered pronouns. In the English dub, Najimi is voiced by non-binary actor Skyler Davenport.	Japan
2021–2022	Komi Can't Communicate	October 7, 2021	Ren Yamai	Lesbian	She has an uncanny romantic obsession with Komi, constantly referring to her as a goddess and is extremely hostile towards people whom she thinks are too close to Komi, especially Tadano, as shown by her act of kidnapping and locking him in her house, threatening to kill him. Her name is a reference to her yandere nature. She also loves fashion and is the head of the women's group in the class.	Japan
2021–2022	Little Ellen	September 13, 2021	Ellen DeGeneres	Lesbian	The series is loosely based on Ellen DeGeneres' childhood. DeGeneres is a lesbian in real life.	United States
2021–2022	Little Ellen	September 13, 2021	Tallulah	Lesbian	Tallulah is the owner of a bakery shop that Ellen and her friends visit. In the season 2 finale "Tallulah Ties the Knot", Tallulah marries her girlfriend Nini.	United States
2021–2022	Little Ellen	March 3, 2022	Nini	Lesbian	Nini is Talullah's wife. Nini is voiced by bisexual comedian Margaret Cho.	United States
2021–2022	Middlemost Post	July 9, 2021	Parker J. Cloud	Non-binary	Parker J. Cloud is an anthropomorphic cloud who delivers mail. Parker is non-binary and uses they/them pronouns. Middlemost Post is the first Nickelodeon series to feature a non-binary lead protagonist.	United States
2021–2023	Ada Twist, Scientist	January 25, 2022	Sensei Dave	Gay	Sensei Dave is introduced as Rosie Revere's Karate teacher in the season two episode "Mind Over Muscle". Dave is revealed to be gay as he marries his boyfriend Jiu Jitsu Joe in the season four episode "Blue River Wedding". Dave is voiced by gay actor George Takei.	United States
2021–2023	HouseBroken	May 31, 2021	Chief	Bisexual	Chief is Honey's mate. He is confirmed to be bisexual when he shows interest in a male dog named Flapjack in the season 2 episode "Who's Married?" Honey and Chief get into a brief polyamorous relationship with Flapjack.	United States
2021–2023	My Life is Worth Living	September 1, 2021	Scott	Gay	Scott is a public speaker. He is revealed to be gay in Dante's Story.	United States
2021–2023	My Life is Worth Living	September 8, 2021	Dante	Gay	Dante is a high school football player. He also struggled to come out of the closet.	United States
2021–2023	Ridley Jones	July 13, 2021	Fred	Non-binary	Fred is a non-binary bison who prefers they/them pronouns. They are voiced by non-binary actor Iris Menas, as confirmed by showrunner and creator Chris Nee.	United States
2021–2023	Ridley Jones	July 13, 2021	Aten	Gay	Aten and Kosi are Ismat's fathers. They are voiced by gay actors Andrew Rannells and Chris Colfer.	United States
2021–2023	Ridley Jones	July 13, 2021	Kosi	Gay	Aten and Kosi are Ismat's fathers. They are voiced by gay actors Andrew Rannells and Chris Colfer.	United States
2021–2024	Arcane	November 13, 2021	Caitlyn Kiramman	Lesbian	She is attracted to Vi, a woman from the undercity, despite their different circumstances. Show writer Amanda Overton said that the relationship between Caitlyn and Vi is "naturally developing," with writers honoring the lived experiences of both characters. Overton said that in Piltover, where Caitlyn lives, there is no word for describing those who are gay or any homophobia, meaning that Caitlyn could "marry any gender or race suitor," with such a person becoming "part of her house." Their relationship deepens in the second season, including both of them fighting together as Enforcers, and kissing one another, before they part ways in the third episode of the season. Before Vi and Caitlyn get back together in the show's second arc, Caitlyn is shown in a romantic relationship with a fellow enforcer, Maddie Nolen. In the third arc, Caitlyn and Vi rekindle their relationship, have sex in a prison cell together, and live happily ever after in the finale.	United States
2021–2024	Arcane	November 6, 2021	Violet "Vi"	Lesbian	In the episode "Everybody Wants to Be My Enemy", Vi tells Caitlyn "you're hot, Cupcake," with writer Amanda Overton saying that this line was added to bring clarity to her character and showed that she loves women. In the same episode, Vi curiously looks at Caitlyn after seeing her chat with a woman while they are in the Pleasure House. In the show's ninth episode, Vi's sister, Jinx, describes Caitlyn as Vi's girlfriend. Other reviewers either noted the queer coding in the relationship between Vi and Caitlyn, or called their relationship "serious" and "touching". Before the release of the second season, Vi's voice actress, Hailee Steinfeld, said that the relationship, in the first and second seasons, between Vi and Caitlyn is beautiful and complex," with push and pull between then, adding "one minute, they might stand for the same thing and be in agreement, and then there's conflict" while noting that Vi leans on Caitlyn "immensely and trusts her and almost defers to her, and they make a great team."	United States
2021–2024	Arcane	November 9, 2024	Maddie Nolen	Lesbian	She was a junior officer, in the Enforcers, in Piltover. During the second arc of the second season, she was shown in a sexual relationship with Caitlyn Kiramman, a fellow enforcer. Later, Maddie and Caitlyn end their relationship. In the finale episode "The Dirt Under Your Nails", Maddie is revealed to be a double agent for Ambessa and betrays Caitlyn. She was going to kill her but ended up getting killed by the bullet, due to Mel's magic. Maddie's voice actor, Katy Townsend, later told The Direct that she knew that the relationship between Maddie and Caitlyn would be controversial, noted that the writer of the episode "Paint the Town Blue", Amanda Overton, told her that "this is gonna cause all kinds of chaos," and further said that even though she is a fan of the Caitlyn/Vi pairing, she "underestimated the extent [of] the chaos that this would cause." She also told the publication that the relationship was not Maddie's responsibility, but that Cait "has a lot to answer for her own choices and decisions" as well.	United States
2021–2024	Monsters at Work	July 7, 2021	Katherine "Cutter" Sterns	Bisexual	In season 2, it is revealed that Cutter, who has many ex-husbands, used to date another woman Sunny Sunshine. They resume their relationship and kissed by the end of the season. Sunny Sunshine is voiced by lesbian comedian Paula Pell.	United States
2021–2024	Monsters at Work	April 13, 2024	Suzy "Sunny" Sunshine	Lesbian	In season 2, it is revealed that Cutter, who has many ex-husbands, used to date another woman Sunny Sunshine. They resume their relationship and kissed by the end of the season. Sunny Sunshine is voiced by lesbian comedian Paula Pell.	United States
2021–2024	Star Trek: Prodigy	October 28, 2021	Zero	Genderless	Zero is a Medusan. Medusans are genderless aliens who prefer they/them pronouns.	United States
2021–2024	Strawberry Shortcake: Berry in the Big City	September 18, 2021	Aunt Praline	Bisexual or pansexual	Aunt Praline is Strawberry Shortcake's aunt. In the Valentine's Day-themed episode "Aunt Praline's Sweetie Pie", she is revealed to be bisexual as Aunt Praline is currently dating another woman Kiki KeyLime. The episode was nominated for a GLAAD Media Award for Outstanding Children's Programming.	Canada
2021–2024	Strawberry Shortcake: Berry in the Big City	March 12, 2022	Kiki KeyLime	Lesbian	Kiki KeyLime is the host of a cooking competition show. She becomes Aunt Praline's girlfriend in the episode "Aunt Praline's Sweetie Pie".	Canada
2021–2024	Strawberry Shortcake: Berry in the Big City	November 20, 2021	Dr. Lime Pops	Gay	Dr. Lime Pops and Fluffy Chiffon are Lime Chiffon's dads. They first appeared in the two-part Thanksgiving episode "Berry Bounty Banquet". Fluffy Chiffon is a fashion designer as shown in the episodes "Bread's New BFF" and "The Fashion Show!".	Canada
2021–2024	Strawberry Shortcake: Berry in the Big City	November 20, 2021	Fluffy Chiffon	Gay	Dr. Lime Pops and Fluffy Chiffon are Lime Chiffon's dads. They first appeared in the two-part Thanksgiving episode "Berry Bounty Banquet". Fluffy Chiffon is a fashion designer as shown in the episodes "Bread's New BFF" and "The Fashion Show!".	Canada
2021–2024	Strawberry Shortcake: Berry in the Big City	September 10, 2022	Banoffee	Trans woman	Banoffee is a transgender fashion model. Her dress for the Mint Gala uses transgender pride colors. She returned in the episode "Strawberry and the Gigantic Cake". She is voiced by transgender actress Felicia Bonée.	Canada
2021–2024	The Ghost and Molly McGee	October 1, 2021	Andrea Davenport	Queer	Andrea Davenport is a popular girl at Molly's school. In the episode "Davenport's in Demise", Andrea is shown having a crush on another girl, Alina Webster, and plans to marry her in the future. The episode's writer, Sammie Crowley, later directly labeled Andrea as "queer", commenting that, along with being attracted to girls, "she might be into guys or other genders, too. She's young and figuring it out".	United States
2021–2024	The Ghost and Molly McGee	October 2, 2021	Geoff	Gay	Geoff is Scratch's ghost friend. He was his only friend before Molly and her family moved in. In the season two episode "The (After)life of the Party", Geoff is revealed to be gay and has been in a relationship with another ghost named Jeff for 100 years. Geoff's sexuality and his romantic relationship with Jeff had already been confirmed in the Chibi Tiny Tales short "Molly, Scratch's Third Wheel", in which they were shown with the other couples.	United States
2021–2024	The Ghost and Molly McGee	March 5, 2022	Jeff	Gay	Jeff is a buff ghost. He is revealed to be Geoff's "Afterlife Partner" in the episode "The (After)life of the Party". Jeff is voiced by gay actor Vincent Rodriguez III.	United States
2021–2024	The Ghost and Molly McGee	October 6, 2021	Mrs. Roop	Lesbian	Mrs. Roop is the History teacher at Brighton Middle School. In the episode "Mazel Tov, Libby!", she is shown slow-dancing with a woman. In the following episode "No Good Deed", she is confirmed to be a lesbian and the woman she danced with is Pam, her wife. They are voiced by lesbian actresses, Jane Lynch and Erica Luttrell, respectively.	United States
2021–2024	The Ghost and Molly McGee	October 30, 2021	Pam Roop	Lesbian	Mrs. Roop is the History teacher at Brighton Middle School. In the episode "Mazel Tov, Libby!", she is shown slow-dancing with a woman. In the following episode "No Good Deed", she is confirmed to be a lesbian and the woman she danced with is Pam, her wife. They are voiced by lesbian actresses, Jane Lynch and Erica Luttrell, respectively.	United States
2021–2025	Jellystone!	July 29, 2021	Jabberjaw Jr.	Bisexual trans woman	Jabberjaw is an employee at the clothing store Magilla's and the daughter of the original Jabberjaw. Jabberjaw is a transgender woman.	United States
2021–2025	Jellystone!	July 29, 2021	Squiddly Diddly	Trans woman	Squiddly Diddly is the proprietor of a music store. In Jellystone!, Squiddly is portrayed as a transgender woman.	United States
2021–2025	Jellystone!	July 29, 2021	Bobbie Louie	Trans woman	In Jellystone!, Baba Looey was renamed Bobbie Louie and is a businesswoman. Bobbie is also transgender.	United States
2021–2025	Jellystone!	July 29, 2021	Loopy De Loop Jr.	Trans woman	Loopy De Loop is Jabberjaw's co-worker and is the daughter of the original Loopy De Loop. Like Jabberjaw, she is also transgender.	United States
2021–2025	Jellystone!	July 29, 2021	Jonny Quest	Gay	Based on the Hanna-Barbera characters, the two of them are featured grown up and a married couple and run the town's bowling alley, confirmed by writer Melody Iza in July 2021. The season 2 episode "The Sea Monster of Jellystone Cove" takes a look at their relationship.	United States
2021–2025	Jellystone!	July 29, 2021	Hadji Singh	Gay	Based on the Hanna-Barbera characters, the two of them are featured grown up and a married couple and run the town's bowling alley, confirmed by writer Melody Iza in July 2021. The season 2 episode "The Sea Monster of Jellystone Cove" takes a look at their relationship.	United States
2021–2025	Jellystone!	July 29, 2021	Snagglepuss	Gay	Snagglepuss was confirmed to be gay by writer Melody Iza.	United States
2021–2025	Jellystone!	July 29, 2021	Mildew Wolf	Gay or bisexual	In the episode "Grocery Store", Mildew Wolf is shown flirting with his co-worker Shazzan. His original voice actor, Paul Lynde, who voiced him in the Cattanooga Cats segment It's the Wolf!, was gay.	United States
2021–2025	The Great North	January 3, 2021	Ham Tobin	Gay	Ham is a teen trying to find his place in the world and comes out to his family as gay, even though he did so in the past.	United States
2021–2025	The Great North	January 3, 2021	Crispin Cienfuegos	Gay	Crispin is a teen who works at a smoothie bar. Judy originally had a crush on him until "Pride & Prejudance Adventure" when it is revealed that Crispin is gay and is into Judy's brother Ham. He and Ham became a couple. However, the two broke up in the season five episode "Bots on the Side Adventure" and Crispin is shown to be dating another boy named Sean in the later episode "Ham to Lose A Guy Adventure". Crispin was originally voiced by gay actor Julio Torres from season 1-season 3 episode 18 and was voiced by bisexual actor Juan Castrano from seasons 3-5.	United States
2021–2026	Rugrats	May 27, 2021	Betty DeVille	Lesbian	Betty DeVille is the mother of Phil and Lil DeVille. In the original series, she was married to a man Howard DeVille. In the reboot, Betty is a gay single mother. Betty is voiced by queer actress Natalie Morales, describing the character as a "single mom with her own business who has twins" but still hangs out with her community and friends, even casually talking about her ex-girlfriend.	United States
2021–2026	Rugrats	April 14, 2023	Trish	Lesbian	Betty's new girlfriend who appears in season 2. Trish is voiced by bisexual actress Alia Shawkat.	United States
2021–2026	Rugrats	May 27, 2021	Graham Prescott	Bisexual	Graham Prescott is a flamboyant aging hippy. He first appeared in the first episode "Second Time Around" in which he is one of Grandpa Lou's dates from the seniors-only dating app Silver Beagles that Angelica only used to get cookies and sweets out of elderly people. Graham is shown to be romantically interested in Lou. Lou turns him down but they both become friends. In the holiday episode "Traditions", Graham is interested in Betty's aunt Tia Esperanza.	United States
2021–present	Invincible	March 26, 2021	William Francis Clockwell	Gay	Mark Grayson's best friend who has a crush on Mark's dad Omni-Man. He is voiced by gay actor Andrew Rannells in the first three seasons and gay comedian Brandon Scott Jones since season 4. In the episode "You Look Kinda Dead", he visits Upstate University for the weekend to visit Rick Sheridan, his ex-boyfriend who turns into a cyborg called a "Reaniman" by young mad scientist D.A. Sinclair. His gay identity is established at the beginning of the series.	United States
2021–present	Invincible	April 15, 2021	Rick Sheridan	Gay	Rick is William's boyfriend who was turned into a Reaniman by D.A. Sinclair. Rick is voiced by gay actors Jonathan Groff in the first season and Luke Macfarlane in the second season.	United States
2021–present	Invincible	March 26, 2021	Connie / War Woman II	Lesbian	Connie is a businesswoman. She was in a relationship with War Woman. Connie took on the mantle of War Woman after her lover was murdered by Omni-Man. Unlike the original War Woman; she is a supervillain. Connie is voiced by pansexual actress Mae Whitman.	United States
2021–present	Invincible	April 9, 2021	Magmaniac	Gay	Magmaniac and Tether Tyrant are supervillains who worked as bodyguards for Machine Head. In the third season episode "You Want a Real Costume, Right?", they are revealed to be a same-sex couple.	United States
2021–present	Invincible	April 9, 2021	Tether Tyrant	Gay	Magmaniac and Tether Tyrant are supervillains who worked as bodyguards for Machine Head. In the third season episode "You Want a Real Costume, Right?", they are revealed to be a same-sex couple.	United States

== 2022 ==
Duration	Show title	Character debut date	Characters	Identity	Notes	Country
2022	Battle Kitty	April 19, 2022	Orc	Gay	Orc is Battle Kitty's best friend. In the episode "Warrior Park", Orc is revealed to be gay as he has a crush on Iago. Orc and Iago eventually become a couple.	United States
2022	Battle Kitty	April 19, 2022	Iago	Gay	Iago is one of the warriors at Battle Island and Orc's love interest. He seems receptive to Orc's feelings. Iago accepts his feelings and starts a relationship with Orc.	Australia
2022	Baymax!	June 29, 2022	Mbita	Gay	Mbita runs a fish truck despite developing an allergy to fish. He develops a romantic relationship with a man named Yukio. Mbita is voiced by gay comedian Jaboukie Young-White.	United States
2022	Baymax!	June 29, 2022	Yukio	Gay	Mbita runs a fish truck despite developing an allergy to fish. He develops a romantic relationship with a man named Yukio. Mbita is voiced by gay comedian Jaboukie Young-White.	United States
2022	Dead End: Paranormal Park	June 16, 2022	Barney Guttman	Gay trans man	In an interview on August 17, 2020, series creator Hamish Steele described Barney as a trans male character. He also hoped that the show will help out "more trans creators getting their chance to tell their stories" while hinting at other LGBTQ characters in the show apart from Barney. Barney is in a same-sex relationship with Logs, a health and safety worker at Dead End. Barney is voiced by trans actor Zach Barack. Steele also said in an interview with The Hollywood Reporter that any possible future episodes would further explore the sexualities of Norma and Barney. In the second season, it is revealed Logs' mother is unaware that he is gay.	United Kingdom
2022	Dead End: Paranormal Park	June 16, 2022	Logan "Logs" Nguyen	Gay		United States
2022	Dead End: Paranormal Park	June 16, 2022	Norma Khan	Bisexual	Norma is Barney's Pakistani-American, autistic best friend. Although she was assumed to be pansexual, due to an illustration by series creator Hamish Steele showing her holding the pansexual pride flag, he later clarified in a Twitter direct message that she likes multiple genders but initially did not identify with any specific label. She comes out as bisexual in the second season. She has a crush on Badyah Hassan, her chaotic friend of Iranian descent who works at Dead End with her and seemingly returns her feelings.	United States
2022	Dead End: Paranormal Park	June 16, 2022	Courtney Cahatel	Non-binary	Series creator Hamish Steele said that Courtney is not "aware of gender in any way" and cannot be misgendered, noting that all pronouns were used in production. He added that he uses they/them for Courtney, but that Netflix persuaded them to use the pronouns of the person cast for Courtney's voice role (Emily Osment), which are she/her.	United States
2022	Dead End: Paranormal Park	June 16, 2022	Margie	Lesbian	Margie and Marly are an elderly African-American lesbian couple who frequently visit Phoenix Park. They have a young son Vince. Margie is voiced by transgender actress Angelica Ross.	United States
2022	Dead End: Paranormal Park	June 16, 2022	Marly	Lesbian	Margie and Marly are an elderly African-American lesbian couple who frequently visit Phoenix Park. They have a young son Vince. Margie is voiced by transgender actress Angelica Ross.	United States
2022	Dead End: Paranormal Park	June 16, 2022	Zagan	Trans woman	Series creator Hamish Steele confirmed on Twitter that Zagan is trans. Zagan is voiced by transgender actress and singer Michaela Jaé Rodriguez.	United States
2022	Dragon Age: Absolution	December 9, 2022	Miriam	Lesbian	Miriam is a Tevinter mercenary and runaway slave. She was in a relationship with Hira.	Canada
2022	Dragon Age: Absolution	December 9, 2022	Hira	Lesbian	Hira is a human mage and Miriam's former lover.	Canada
2022	Dragon Age: Absolution	December 9, 2022	Roland	Gay	Roland is a warrior and Miriam's ally. He also gets into a relationship with dwarven fighter Lacklon.	Canada
2022	Dragon Age: Absolution	December 9, 2022	Lacklon	Gay	Roland is a warrior and Miriam's ally. He also gets into a relationship with dwarven fighter Lacklon.	South Korea
2022	Life with an Ordinary Guy Who Reincarnated into a Total Fantasy Knockout	January 11, 2022	Hinata Tachibana	Bisexual trans woman	A frustrated and lonely man, save for his friend Jinguji Tsukasa, Hinata drunkenly expresses his wish to become a woman, saying "I want to become a woman so beautiful that I couldn't possibly exist in this world". The wish is granted by a goddess who transports the two of them to a fantasy world and transforms Hinata into a woman. Despite her protests and claims not to have made such a wish, her "game stats" list her gender (not sex) as female, heavily indicating that she is in fact trans, as supported by her prior despair-induced outburst.	Japan
2022	Little Demon	August 25, 2022	Laura Feinberg	Bisexual	Laura Feinberg is Chrissy's mother and Satan's ex-lover. In the episode "Wet Bodies", Laura is revealed to be bisexual as she formerly had a same-sex relationship with Sea Hag. Laura is voiced by bisexual actress Aubrey Plaza.	United States
2022	Lycoris Recoil	July 2, 2022	Mika	Gay	Mika is an Afro-Japanese man who is the manager at LyroReco. In the seventh episode "Time will tell", he is revealed to be gay with the main characters being aware of it. The ninth episode "What's done is done" shows he was in a relationship with a man named Shinji.	Japan
2022	Sasaki and Miyano	January 10, 2022	Yoshikazu Miyano	Gay	Miyano Yoshikazu is a timid high school student who secretly enjoys reading boys' love (BL) manga. Curious and intrigued by his interests, an older student named Sasaki Shumei begins borrowing BL manga from him, leading to frequent conversations and a growing friendship. As they spend more time together, Sasaki develops romantic feelings for Miyano, while Miyano begins to question his own emotions and understandings of love.	Japan
2022	Sasaki and Miyano	January 10, 2022	Shūmei Sasaki	Gay	Miyano Yoshikazu is a timid high school student who secretly enjoys reading boys' love (BL) manga. Curious and intrigued by his interests, an older student named Sasaki Shumei begins borrowing BL manga from him, leading to frequent conversations and a growing friendship. As they spend more time together, Sasaki develops romantic feelings for Miyano, while Miyano begins to question his own emotions and understandings of love.	Japan
2022	The Executioner and Her Way of Life	April 2, 2022	Akari Tokitō	Lesbian	One of the main protagonists. She is a high school student who possesses the Pure Concept of Time, making her capable of reversing events. She is initially portrayed as rather clumsy and air-headed, but also kind and trusting, leading her to easily trust Menou upon their first meeting as she believed that their encounter was fate despite the fact that Menou has a mission to kill her. She is deeply in love with Menou.	Japan
2022	The Executioner and Her Way of Life	April 2, 2022	Momo	Lesbian	A young priestess and Menou's aide. She assists Menou on anything she needs during a mission, including reconnaissance, providing disguises, and providing support in battles. She has had a crush on Menou ever since they were childhood friends, and hence treasures the hair ribbons gifted to her dearly. With Menou insisting that she hide her presence from Akari, Momo begins to grow jealous at how close the two are getting.	Japan
2022	RWBY: Ice Queendom	July 3, 2022	Shion Zaiden	Non-binary	A nightmare hunter who captures Grimm who possesses people in their dreams. Their presence in the series was praised by some reviewers. While the official Japanese website, refers to Shion with male pronouns, Rooster Teeth treats Shion as nonbinary. Christine Brent, Senior Brand Director for Rooster Teeth, described Shion as fantastic, "totally nonbinary", and unique to this series, while using they/them pronouns for Shion, and said she would like to do similar characters in the future.	Japan
2022	Supernatural Academy	January 20, 2022	Jae	Non-binary	Jae is a Faerie student who goes to Supernatural Academy. They are non-binary and prefer they/them pronouns. Jae is voiced by transgender and non-binary actor Ali J. Eisner.	United States
2022	Vampire in the Garden	May 16, 2022	Fine	Lesbian	Fine is the Queen of the Vampires who resists her role as Queen and wishes the war would end. Having lost the human love of her life, Aria, to the war she often wishes to die. She then meets Momo, a young human who resembles Aria, whom she gets into a romance with.	Japan
2022	Vampire in the Garden	May 16, 2022	Momo	Lesbian	Momo is a human teenager and trainee soldier who struggles with the constant war between humans and vampires. She mets the Fine on the battlefield when she embarks on a journey and build up a romance with her.	Japan
2022–2023	Human Resources	March 18, 2022	Nadia el-Koury	Lesbian	Nadia is Natalie's older sister who plans on going to college. She is in a relationship with a woman named Danielle. Nadia is voiced by lesbian comedian Sabrina Jalees and Danielle is voiced by queer actress Ariana DeBose.	United States
2022–2023	Human Resources	March 18, 2022	Danielle	Lesbian	Nadia is Natalie's older sister who plans on going to college. She is in a relationship with a woman named Danielle. Nadia is voiced by lesbian comedian Sabrina Jalees and Danielle is voiced by queer actress Ariana DeBose.	United States
2022–2023	Mobile Suit Gundam: The Witch from Mercury	October 2, 2022	Suletta Mercury	Bisexual	Initially showing attraction to men and not knowing about the idea of same-sex relationships, Suletta Mercury, the main character, gradually develops mutual romantic feelings for Miorine, the girl whose fiancé she accidentally becomes. Although the show mostly tries to keep it within the subtext, in the end, both girls in one way or another declare a clear desire to actually get married and are shown as spouses with rings on their ring fingers at the end of the story. The status of the two girls as a married same-sex couple was also confirmed by their voice actresses on the final stream on the day of the show's final episode. Thus, Suletta becomes not only the official first female, but also the first LGBTQ protagonist in the franchise.	Japan
2022–2023	Mobile Suit Gundam: The Witch from Mercury	October 2, 2022	Miorine Rembran	Queer	Miorine is portrayed from the very beginning as an open-minded girl who is tolerant of same-sex relationships and does not see anything strange in the fact that another girl can be her fiancé. In the future, she develops a mutual romantic relationship and becomes official spouses with Suletta Mercury. At various points in the story, it is shown that even in the past, she could have both straight and lesbian relationships if her childhood friends had more courage to stand up for their intimacy with her.	Japan
2022–2023	Pinecone & Pony	April 8, 2022	Gladys	Queer	Gladys is the teacher for the Lil Rumblers. She is in a relationship with Wren. Her partner Wren is a non-binary person who prefers they/them pronouns. Wren is voiced by non-binary actor Ser Anzoategui. In the season 2 episode "A Life of Adventure", Gladys visits an old friend to honor her friend's sister Juli. Juli was also Gladys' wife who died before the events of the series. It is also noted that she lived a full life.	United States
2022–2023	Pinecone & Pony	April 8, 2022	Wren	Non-binary	Gladys is the teacher for the Lil Rumblers. She is in a relationship with Wren. Her partner Wren is a non-binary person who prefers they/them pronouns. Wren is voiced by non-binary actor Ser Anzoategui. In the season 2 episode "A Life of Adventure", Gladys visits an old friend to honor her friend's sister Juli. Juli was also Gladys' wife who died before the events of the series. It is also noted that she lived a full life.	United States
2022–2023	Pinecone & Pony	April 8, 2022	Wren	Non-binary	Gladys is the teacher for the Lil Rumblers. She is in a relationship with Wren. Her partner Wren is a non-binary person who prefers they/them pronouns. Wren is voiced by non-binary actor Ser Anzoategui. In the season 2 episode "A Life of Adventure", Gladys visits an old friend to honor her friend's sister Juli. Juli was also Gladys' wife who died before the events of the series. It is also noted that she lived a full life.	Canada
2022–2023	Pinecone & Pony	April 8, 2022	Greymoon	Gay	Greymoon is the teacher for the Wiz Kids. He was confirmed to be gay by series writer Taneka Stotts. Greymoon is voiced by gay actor Thom Allison.	Canada
2022–2024	Big Nate	February 17, 2022	Dee Dee Holloway	Lesbian	Dee Dee Holloway is one of Nate's friends. In the episode "The Pimple", she was overjoyed that the substitute drama teacher, Donna, is married to another woman, Kathleen, and her fantasy features rainbow imagery. Dee Dee is confirmed to be a lesbian in the episode "Six-Tween Candles", in where she starts dating a girl named Amy.	United States
2022–2024	Monster High	October 6, 2022	Frankie Stein	Non-binary	Frankie Stein is a monster who was created by scientists. Unlike the previous incarnations where Frankie was a cisgender woman and Frankenstein's monster and his bride's daughter, Frankie is a non-binary monster. In the series and live-action film, Frankie is a non-binary monster who prefers they/them pronouns. In the episode "Horoscare", they are revealed to have feelings for Cleo de Nile and Cleo is receptive towards. Iris Menas, who voices Stein, is a non-binary actor.	United States
2022–2024	Monster High	November 29, 2022	Medusa Gorgon	Lesbian	Medusa is Deuce Gorgon's mother. The original toyline and 2016 reboot mention Deuce having Medusa as a mother but a father was never mentioned. In the series, Medusa is married to another woman Lyra who is a siren.	United States
2022–2024	Monster High	October 2, 2023	Lyra Gorgon	Lesbian	Lyra is Deuce Gorgon's other mother and Medusa's wife. She makes her debut in the season 2 episode "Spell the Beans". Lyra is voiced by non–binary actor Jessie Hendricks.	United States
2022–2025	Call of the Night	July 18, 2022	Kabura Honda	Lesbian or bisexual	Kabura Honda is a feminine vampire who looks after Nazuna and occasionally flirts semi-seriously with her potential boyfriend Kou, teasingly arguing that she is attracted to other people's partners. In episode 4 of the show's second season, it is revealed that she was once a closeted introverted lesbian who first became self-aware after falling in love with Haru, Nazuna's mother, and subsequently being transformed into a vampire. Although she is finally able to date and feel attraction to men after her transformation, she still has a special preference for women. In the next episode, she mentions that Nazuna's mother was her first love, after Ko convinces her that she was a surrogate mother for Nazuna.	Japan
2022–2025	Call of the Night	September 15, 2022	Kyoko Mejiro	Bisexual or Pansexual	Kyoko is initially introduced into the story as Anko Ugusui, a cynical and cruel vampire hunter who openly flirts with other characters regardless of their gender. It is later revealed that she was Nazuna's first "childhood" friend, who once asked her to be his familiar to escape her family problems, but was unable to due to her experiences as a human making her unable to fall in love with anyone despite being somewhat attracted to Nazuna. At the end of her character arc, she attempts to use fighting vampires as an excuse to die, but Ko and Nazuna manage to save her in a dramatic confrontation.	Japan
2022–2025	Firebuds	September 23, 2022	Viv Vega-Vaughn	Lesbian	Viv and Val Vega-Vaughn are the adoptive mothers of Violet Vega-Vaughn. They both work as EMTs. Viv is voiced by queer actress Natalie Morales.	United States
2022–2025	Firebuds	September 23, 2022	Val Vega-Vaughn	Lesbian	Viv and Val Vega-Vaughn are the adoptive mothers of Violet Vega-Vaughn. They both work as EMTs. Viv is voiced by queer actress Natalie Morales.	United States
2022–2025	Firebuds	September 23, 2022	Arnie Ambrose	Gay	Arnie and AJ Ambrose are the fathers of Axl. Arnie is voiced by gay actor Stephen Guarino.	United States
2022–2025	Firebuds	September 23, 2022	AJ Ambrose	Gay	Arnie and AJ Ambrose are the fathers of Axl. Arnie is voiced by gay actor Stephen Guarino.	United States
2022–2025	Transformers: EarthSpark	November 11, 2022	Nightshade	Non-binary	One of the new members of Terrans, Transformers born on Earth and ally of the Autobots and the Malto family who first appears in the two-part episode "Age of Evolution". Nightshade explains to Optimus Prime that they go by they/them pronouns, as "he or she just doesn't fit who [they are]". Nightshade is voiced by non-binary actor Z Infante.	United States
2022–2026	The Proud Family: Louder and Prouder	February 23, 2022	Barry Leibowitz-Jenkins	Gay	Barry and Randall Leibowitz-Jenkins are the adoptive parents of Maya and Francis "KG" Leibowitz-Jenkins. They are an interracial gay couple. They are voiced by Zachary Quinto and Billy Porter, who are both gay in real life. The season 2 episode "Perfect 10" shows how Barry and Randall got together.	United States
2022–2026	The Proud Family: Louder and Prouder	March 9, 2022	Randall Leibowitz-Jenkins	Gay	Barry and Randall Leibowitz-Jenkins are the adoptive parents of Maya and Francis "KG" Leibowitz-Jenkins. They are an interracial gay couple. They are voiced by Zachary Quinto and Billy Porter, who are both gay in real life. The season 2 episode "Perfect 10" shows how Barry and Randall got together.	United States
2022–2026	The Proud Family: Louder and Prouder	February 23, 2022	Michael Collins	Gay	Michael Collins is the effeminate male friend of Penny Proud. Michael is also established as gender non-conforming. He is voiced by a gay actor, E.J. Johnson (Magic Johnson's son) in The Proud Family: Louder and Prouder. The young adult version of Michael is voiced by gay actor Jeremy O. Harris. While there were some episodes in the original series, The Proud Family, that teased a relationship between him and LaCienega such as the episode "Who You Calling a Sissy?". In The Proud Family: Louder and Prouder, he is explicitly only into men. In the season 2 episode "BeBe", he starts dating Makeup Boy. In the scrapped episode "They're Gonna Love Me", Michael was going to come out as non-binary and switch to they/them pronouns.	United States
2022–2026	The Proud Family: Louder and Prouder	February 23, 2022	Sebastian Boyd (Makeup Boy)	Gay	Makeup Boy (real name Sebastian Boyd) is a flamboyant internet personality who gives out makeup tips. In the season 2 episode "BeBe", Makeup Boy is confirmed to be gay as he and Michael are shown to be dating. Makeup Boy is voiced by gay internet personality Bretman Rock.	United States
2022–present	The Legend of Vox Machina	January 28, 2022	Vex'ahlia "Vex" de Rolo	Bisexual	Vex'ahlia and Vax'ildan are half-Elf twin siblings and members of the Vox Machina team. Both siblings are bisexual.	United States
2022–present	The Legend of Vox Machina	January 28, 2022	Vax'ildan "Vax" Vessar	Bisexual	Vex'ahlia and Vax'ildan are half-Elf twin siblings and members of the Vox Machina team. Both siblings are bisexual.	United States
2022–present	The Legend of Vox Machina	January 28, 2022	Keyleth of the Air Ashari	Queer	Keyleth of the Air Ashari is a half-elf druid. She has been stated as either bisexual, asexual, or demisexual. She later begins a romantic relationship with Vax.	United States
2022–present	The Legend of Vox Machina	January 28, 2022	Scanlan Shorthalt	Queer	Scanlan Shorthalt is a gnome bard. He is in love with a woman and marries her. He also had a daughter with another woman. However, he has had relationships with people of multiple genders.	United States
2022–present	The Legend of Vox Machina	January 28, 2022	Lady Kima	Lesbian	Lady Kima is a member of the Tal'Dorei Council. She eventually gets into a relationship with Lady Allura and marries her. Lady Kima is voiced by bisexual actress Stephanie Beatriz.	United States
2022–present	The Legend of Vox Machina	January 28, 2022	Lady Allura Vysoren	Queer	Lady Allura is a member of the Tal'Dorei Council. She eventually gets into a relationship with Lady Kima and marries her.	United States
2022–present	We Baby Bears	January 1, 2022	Pirate Polly	Non-binary	Polly, is a parrot who is also a pirate captain. When Polly returns in the season 2 episode "Polly's New Crew", Polly has come out as non-binary and is now using they/them pronouns. Pirate Polly is voiced by production coordinator Em Hagen who is non-binary.	United States
2022–present	We Baby Bears	January 1, 2022	Box	Non-binary	Box, the Bears' friend is non-binary and uses they/them pronouns.	United States

== 2023 ==
Duration	Show title	Character debut date	Characters	Identity	Notes	Country
2023	Captain Laserhawk: A Blood Dragon Remix	October 19, 2023	Dolph Laserhawk	Gay	Dolph Laserhawk is a supersoldier who was betrayed by his boyfriend and is sent to the Supermaxx. Dolph Laserhawk is voiced by queer actor Nathaniel Curtis.	France
2023	Captain Laserhawk: A Blood Dragon Remix	October 19, 2023	Alex Taylor	Gay	Alex Taylor is Dolph's ex-boyfriend. He becomes one of Dolph's enemies.	France
2023	Carol & the End of the World	December 15, 2023	Bernard Kohl	Bisexual	Bernard and Pauline Kohl are Carol's parents. Bernard and Pauline entered into a polyamorous relationship with Bernard's nurse Michael.	United States
2023	Carol & the End of the World	December 15, 2023	Pauline Kohl	Bisexual	Bernard and Pauline Kohl are Carol's parents. Bernard and Pauline entered into a polyamorous relationship with Bernard's nurse Michael.	United States
2023	Carol & the End of the World	December 15, 2023	Michael	Bisexual	Michael is Bernard and Pauline's lover.	United States
2023	Carol & the End of the World	December 15, 2023	Luis Felipe Jacinto	Gay	Luis is an employee in an accounting department, who is friends with co-workers Carol Kohl and Donna Shaw. Luis was in a relationship with a man he met named Wajto.	United States
2023	I'm in Love with the Villainess	October 3, 2023	Rae Taylor	Lesbian	Rae is the main protagonist, who was reincarnated into an otome game world, and has no interest in the game's male capture targets. She adores Claire François, the game's villainess. In the third episode, she openly states that she is gay and believes that her love will not be reciprocated, as she has been hurt by unreciprocated love in the past. In the final episode, Rae is overjoyed when Claire admits she has feelings for her.	Japan
2023	I'm in Love with the Villainess	October 3, 2023	Claire François	Bisexual	She is shown to have a crush on Prince Thane, which is supported by Rae, who is wishing for Claire's happiness. Claire slowly starts having feelings for Rae. In the series finale, Rae wins the contest with Manaria for Claire's love, and offers to be Claire's partner. but when Manaria puts her hands on Rae, saying she is the one she had the crush on, to which Claire responds "Rae belongs to me! You can't take my things from me!" Claire realizes this is a romantic declaration and tries to back out of it, but fails as Rae hugs her. Later on, she hints that she would marry Rae and blushes when Rae teases her.	Japan
2023	I'm in Love with the Villainess	December 5, 2023	Manaria Sousse	Lesbian	A princess of a foreign country who has known Claire since childhood, who is a tomboyish out-of-closet lesbian who transfers to the Royal Academy after being exiled from her kingdom for her sexual identity. After transferring, she develops a crush on Rae and gets close with Claire to make her jealous. In the series finale, she admits she had a crush on Rae the entire time and tries to take Rae away from Claire.	Japan
2023	Koala Man	January 9, 2023	Alison Williams	Lesbian	Alison is Koala Man's daughter who is obsessed with being popular. After becoming the most popular girl at her school; she falls in love with another popular girl Rosie Yodels. Unfortunately, it ends in tragedy as Rosie and her doppelgängers die. Allison is voiced by bisexual comedian Demi Lardner.	United States
2023	Koala Man	January 9, 2023	Rosie Yodels	Lesbian	Alison is Koala Man's daughter who is obsessed with being popular. After becoming the most popular girl at her school; she falls in love with another popular girl Rosie Yodels. Unfortunately, it ends in tragedy as Rosie and her doppelgängers die. Allison is voiced by bisexual comedian Demi Lardner.	Australia
2023	The Magical Revolution of the Reincarnated Princess and the Genius Young Lady	January 4, 2023	Anisphia "Anis" Wynn Palettia	Lesbian	Anis is the princess of the Kingdom of Palettia and an out of closet lesbian. She rescues Euphyllia "Euphy" Magenta from a marriage with her brother, Algard, and makes Euphy her assistant in her magicology experiments. She slowly develops romantic feelings for Euphy. She later reciprocates Euphy's romantic feelings.	Japan
2023	The Magical Revolution of the Reincarnated Princess and the Genius Young Lady	January 4, 2023	Euphyllia "Euphy" Magenta	Lesbian	A high-ranking noble, she is the ex-fiancé of Anisphia's younger brother, Algard, who breaks off their engagement, claiming that Euphy bullied the woman he lived, Lainie Cyan. She is rescued by Anis and becomes her magical assistant. She begins developing romantic feelings toward her. At the end of the series, she completes her magical covenant, to become queen, instead of Anis, who reciprocates her romantic feelings, and joins the royal family.	Japan
2023	Praise Petey	July 21, 2023	Eliza	Lesbian	Eliza is one of Petey's new friends and one of the few sane people in New Utopia. In the seventh episode "The Tangible Secret", Eliza is revealed to be a lesbian as she has a crush on a female plumber named Grease Trap Connie. Connie reciprocates her feelings. This was hinted in the first episode when Eliza states she used to be one of the multiple wives of Petey's father and felt uncomfortable being married to a man. Eliza is voiced by queer actress Kiersey Clemons. The series creator, Anna Drezen, noted that she liked to "see people in beautiful locations flirting" and that it is "fun to have characters be nervous around each other and try to prove a point, while they also have feelings for each other" like Connie and Eliza, and noting romcom elements in the series.	United States
2023	Praise Petey	August 11, 2023	Grease Trap Connie	Lesbian	Grease Trap Connie is a plumber. She becomes Eliza's girlfriend in the episode "The Tangible Secret". Connie reappears in the final two episodes of the series. Grease Trap Connie is voiced by queer comedian Paris Sashay.	United States
2023	Scavengers Reign	October 19, 2023	Azi	Lesbian	Azi is a cargo specialist stranded on the planet Vesta. Azi was in a relationship with another woman named Mia before she got stranded. In the final episode, she reunites with Mia, and they restart their relationship together.	United States
2023	Scavengers Reign	October 19, 2023	Mia	Lesbian	Azi is a cargo specialist stranded on the planet Vesta. Azi was in a relationship with another woman named Mia before she got stranded. In the final episode, she reunites with Mia, and they restart their relationship together.	United States
2023	Scott Pilgrim Takes Off	November 17, 2023	Ramona Flowers	Bisexual	Ramona is Scott Pilgrim's girlfriend and the main protagonist of the series. She was in a same-sex relationship with Roxie Ritcher and previously in relationships with six boyfriends (Matthew Patel, Lucas Lee, Todd Ingram, Gideon Graves, Kyle Katayanagi, and Ken Katayanagi).	United States
2023	Scott Pilgrim Takes Off	November 17, 2023	Wallace Wells	Gay	Wallace Wells is Scott's gay roommate. He was in a romantic relationship with Todd Ingram on the movie set.	United States
2023	Scott Pilgrim Takes Off	November 17, 2023	Roxanne "Roxie" Ritcher	Lesbian	Roxie is one of Ramona's evil exes. Roxie Ritcher is voiced by pansexual actress Mae Whitman.	Japan
2023	Scott Pilgrim Takes Off	November 17, 2023	Todd Ingram	Bisexual	Todd is a vegan and is one of Ramona's evil exes. In the series, Todd realizes that he is into men as he has a crush on Wallace and they have a romantic relationship.	Japan
2023–2024	Bossy Bear	March 6, 2023	Tyler	Gay	Tyler and Greg are the fathers of Ginger. They both run a food truck. Tyler and Greg are voiced by gay singer Lance Bass and his real-life husband Michael Turchin.	United States
2023–2024	Bossy Bear	March 6, 2023	Greg	Gay	Tyler and Greg are the fathers of Ginger. They both run a food truck. Tyler and Greg are voiced by gay singer Lance Bass and his real-life husband Michael Turchin.	United States
2023–2024	Fright Krewe	October 2, 2023	Judith Le Claire	Lesbian	Judith and Judy Le Claire are the mothers of Soleil Le Claire.	United States
2023–2024	Fright Krewe	October 2, 2023	Judy Le Claire	Lesbian	Judith and Judy Le Claire are the mothers of Soleil Le Claire.	United States
2023–2024	Hailey's On It!	June 8, 2023	Rebecca "Becker" Denoga	Lesbian	Becker is Scott Denoga's younger sister. In the episode "Catching Felines", Becker is revealed to be a lesbian as she's shown having a crush on Hailey and wanting to kiss her. In the episode "Along for the Slide", Becker gets into a relationship with her former rival Kennedy, and they later attend a school dance together.	United States
2023–2024	Hailey's On It!	June 8, 2023	Jonathan	Gay	Jonathan and Thad are an interracial same-sex couple. Jonathan and Thad are voiced by gay actors Nico Santos and Nik Dodani.	United States
2023–2024	Hailey's On It!	June 8, 2023	Thad	Gay	Jonathan and Thad are an interracial same-sex couple. Jonathan and Thad are voiced by gay actors Nico Santos and Nik Dodani.	United States
2023–2024	Hailey's On It!	July 29, 2023	Kennedy	Lesbian	Kennedy is Becker's rival-turned-girlfriend.	United States
2023–2024	Princess Power	January 30, 2023	King Barton Blueberry	Gay	King Barton Blueberry and Sir Benedict Blueberry are Beatrice "Bea" Blueberry's fathers. King Barton is voiced by gay actor Andrew Rannells and Sir Benedict is voiced by gay fashion designer and television personality Tan France.	United States
2023–2024	Princess Power	January 30, 2023	Sir Benedict Blueberry	Gay	King Barton Blueberry and Sir Benedict Blueberry are Beatrice "Bea" Blueberry's fathers. King Barton is voiced by gay actor Andrew Rannells and Sir Benedict is voiced by gay fashion designer and television personality Tan France.	United States
2023–2024	Princess Power	January 30, 2023	Queen Ryung Raspberry	Queer	Queen Ryung is Rita Raspberry's mother. In the second season, Queen Ryung is revealed to be queer as she starts dating Queen Olivia. Queen Ryung and Queen Olivia get married in the third-season episode "Princess Royal Wedding".	Canada
2023–2024	Princess Power	October 23, 2023	Queen Olivia Orange	Queer	Queen Olivia is Queen Ryung's step-wife. She has a daughter from a prior relationship named Omera. Queen Olivia is voiced by queer actress Jameela Jamil.	Canada
2023–2024	Velma	January 12, 2023	Velma Dinkley	Bisexual	While Velma initially had a crush on Daphne's former boyfriend Fred Jones, she is receptive to Daphne's romantic feelings towards her. They also kissed in the second episode "The Candy (Wo)man" She officially enters into a relationship with Daphne in season 2.	United States
2023–2024	Velma	January 12, 2023	Daphne Blake	Bisexual	Daphne Blake is portrayed as an Asian foundling who has a crush on Velma Dinkley. Velma and Daphne kissed in the second episode "The Candy (Wo)man". She also has two mothers Donna and Linda Blake. She officially enters into a relationship with Velma in season 2.	United States
2023–2024	Velma	January 12, 2023	Donna Blake	Lesbian	Donna and Linda Blake are Daphne's adoptive mothers. They both work as detectives. Donna is voiced by lesbian actress Jane Lynch and Linda is voiced by lesbian comedian Wanda Sykes.	United States
2023–2024	Velma	January 12, 2023	Linda Blake	Lesbian	Donna and Linda Blake are Daphne's adoptive mothers. They both work as detectives. Donna is voiced by lesbian actress Jane Lynch and Linda is voiced by lesbian comedian Wanda Sykes.	United States
2023–2024	Velma	April 25, 2024	Amber McKnight	Non-binary	Amber is the child of Hex Girl Thorn. Amber uses they/them pronouns. Amber is voiced by non-binary actor Sara Ramirez.	United States
2023–2024	Vida the Vet	October 20, 2023	Papa	Gay	Papa and Dad are the fathers of Vida.	Canada
2023–2024	Vida the Vet	October 20, 2023	Dad	Gay	Papa and Dad are the fathers of Vida.	Canada
2023–2025	Castlevania: Nocturne	September 28, 2023	Olrox	Gay	Olrox is a vampire of Aztec descent. He is in a same-sex relationship with a knight, Mizrak.	United States
2023–2025	Castlevania: Nocturne	September 28, 2023	Mizrak	Gay	Olrox is a vampire of Aztec descent. He is in a same-sex relationship with a knight, Mizrak.	United States
2023–2025	Digman!	March 22, 2023	Agatha	Lesbian	Agatha is the secretary of Rip Digman. In the season one episode "The Mile High Club", Agatha is revealed to be a lesbian as she was in a relationship with Amelia Earhart (voiced by lesbian actress Jane Lynch). Agatha is voiced by lesbian actress Dale Soules.	United States
2023–2025	Moon Girl and Devil Dinosaur	February 10, 2023	Brooklyn	Trans woman	Brooklyn is one of Lunella's classmates. In the first episode "Moon Girl Landing", Brooklyn's water bottle has a trans pride sticker that says "Trans is beautiful". Brooklyn is voiced by trans and non-binary actor Indya Moore. In November 2024, Polygon reported that the Moon Girl and Devil Dinosaur season 2 episode "The Gatekeeper", about Brooklyn facing discrimination for being a transgender girl, had been held by Disney from airing. Several crew members, such as storyboarder Derrick Malick Johnson, asserted on social media that Disney decided not to air the episode because of "which party that won the recent election", likely referring to the victory of Donald Trump and the Republican Party in the 2024 United States elections. Later reporting by Collider asserted the episode had been on hold for over a year, which had nothing to do with the election results, but that it was unclear if it "will ever be officially released" and that the episode was leaked on YouTube.	United States
2023–2025	Moon Girl and Devil Dinosaur	February 11, 2023	Isaac Calderon	Gay	In the second episode "The Borough Bully", Casey is revealed to have two dads. In the episode "Today, I Am a Woman", Isaac and Antonio showed their wedding photo. It is the first Disney animated series to depict a same-sex wedding. They are voiced by gay actors Andy Cohen and Wilson Cruz.	United States
2023–2025	Moon Girl and Devil Dinosaur	February 11, 2023	Antonio Calderon	Gay	In the second episode "The Borough Bully", Casey is revealed to have two dads. In the episode "Today, I Am a Woman", Isaac and Antonio showed their wedding photo. It is the first Disney animated series to depict a same-sex wedding. They are voiced by gay actors Andy Cohen and Wilson Cruz.	United States
2023–2025	Moon Girl and Devil Dinosaur	February 15, 2023	Tai	Non-binary	Tai is one of Lunella's classmates. Tai is revealed to be non-binary in the episode "Check Yourself" as Tai is referred to with they/them pronouns by Lunella. Tai is voiced by non-binary actor Ian Alexander.	United States
2023–2025	Moon Girl and Devil Dinosaur	February 2, 2024	Merle	Lesbian	Merle and Matsuye are the friends of Lunella's grandmother Mimi. They are both scientists. In a later episode "Dancing with Myself", Merle and Matsuye are revealed to be a same-sex couple in a scene where Lunella explains dating.	United States
2023–2025	Moon Girl and Devil Dinosaur	February 2, 2024	Matsuye	Lesbian	Merle and Matsuye are the friends of Lunella's grandmother Mimi. They are both scientists. In a later episode "Dancing with Myself", Merle and Matsuye are revealed to be a same-sex couple in a scene where Lunella explains dating.	United States
2023–2025	Star Wars: Young Jedi Adventures	May 4, 2023	Kryys and Ceeli Durango	Lesbian	Kryys and Ceeli Durango are the mothers of Nash Durango. Chris Nee, the voice of Kryss Durango is a lesbian and Ceeli Durango is voiced by non-binary actor Hayden Bishop.	United States
2023–2025	Tiny Toons Looniversity	September 8, 2023	Renaldo Raccoon	Gay	Renaldo is a student at ACME Looniversity. He is a flamboyant and openly gay raccoon. In the season two episode "Twin-Con", Renaldo was shown being attracted to Hampton J. Pig during his brief stint as an internet celebrity. Renaldo is voiced by gay actor Tony Rodriguez.	United States
2023–2026	The Amazing Digital Circus	October 13, 2023	Jax	Trans woman	Jax is one of the humans trapped within the titular Digital Circus, a virtual reality simulation. The character is shown to be a closeted trans woman in the series' final episode, "Remember", and was further acknowledged as being transgender in statements by series creator Gooseworx, along with cast members Amanda Hufford and Marissa Lenti.	Australia
2023–2026	The Amazing Digital Circus	October 13, 2023	Zooble	Non-binary	Zooble is one of the humans trapped within the titular Digital Circus, a virtual reality simulation. The character has been stated as being non-binary by series creator Gooseworx, and is exclusively referred to in the series with they/them pronouns. The character's discontent with their digital avatar has been interpreted as a reflection of gender dysphoria and body dysphoria.	Australia
2023–2026	The 100 Girlfriends Who Really, Really, Really, Really, Really Love You	October 8, 2023	Hakari Hanazono	Bisexual	One of Rentarō Aijō's first two girlfriends, along with Karane Inda. In addition to loving Rentarō, she is somewhat attracted to Karane. In the eighth episode, she and Karane have an "extended makeout session" while both are "kiss zombies."	Japan
2023–2026	The 100 Girlfriends Who Really, Really, Really, Really, Really Love You	October 8, 2023	Karane Inda	Bisexual	One of Rentarō's first two girlfriends, along with Hakari Hanazono. While she initially disliked the idea of Rentarō having multiple girlfriends, she soon became accepting of them. In addition to loving Rentarō, she is somewhat attracted to Hakari. She has an extended, and mutually romantic, kiss with Hakari in the eighth episode.	Japan
2023–present	Adventure Time: Fionna and Cake	August 31, 2023	Gary Prince	Gay	The gender-flipped counterparts of Marceline and Princess Bubblegum who are in a same-sex relationship. Gary Prince is voiced by gay actor Andrew Rannells in the first season and queer actor Harvey Guillén in the second season. Marshall Lee is voiced by queer singer Kris Kollins in the second season, replacing Danny Glover who voiced the character in season one.	United States
2023–present	Adventure Time: Fionna and Cake	August 31, 2023	Marshall Lee	Gay	The gender-flipped counterparts of Marceline and Princess Bubblegum who are in a same-sex relationship. Gary Prince is voiced by gay actor Andrew Rannells in the first season and queer actor Harvey Guillén in the second season. Marshall Lee is voiced by queer singer Kris Kollins in the second season, replacing Danny Glover who voiced the character in season one.	United States
2023–present	Adventure Time: Fionna and Cake	August 31, 2023	Hunter	Non-binary	Hunter is one of Fionna Campbell's love interests and the gender-flipped counterpart of Huntress Wizard. In the season two episode "The Lion of Embers", Hunter shows his chest, which has top surgery scars. In a later episode "The Wolves Who Wandered", Hunter is confirmed to be non-binary and uses he/him and they/them pronouns. Hunter is voiced by non-binary and genderfluid actor and drag king Vico Ortiz, who also confirmed Hunter's gender identity on Instagram. In the second season, Hunter's romantic advances are rejected by Fionna, who chooses to get close to her ex-boyfriend, DJ Flame, instead, but later breaks up with him.	United States
2023–present	Adventure Time: Fionna and Cake	August 31, 2023	Hunter	Queer		United States
2023–present	Cocomelon Lane	November 17, 2023	Nico's dads	Gay	Nico has two dads, who watch him dance in a tutu and tiara.	United States
2023–present	My Adventures with Superman	July 7, 2023	Leslie Wallis / Livewire	Lesbian	Livewire is portrayed as a thief who gains electrokinesis. In the season two episode "Olsen's Eleven", Livewire is revealed to be a lesbian as she has entered into a relationship with Heat Wave (portrayed as a woman in this series) and the two kiss one another after helping Lois Lane and Jimmy Olsen escape S.T.A.R. Labs in a rocket. Previously, they worked as criminals together for Intergang.	United States
2023–present	My Adventures with Superman	July 28, 2023	Rory / Heat Wave	Lesbian	Livewire is portrayed as a thief who gains electrokinesis. In the season two episode "Olsen's Eleven", Livewire is revealed to be a lesbian as she has entered into a relationship with Heat Wave (portrayed as a woman in this series) and the two kiss one another after helping Lois Lane and Jimmy Olsen escape S.T.A.R. Labs in a rocket. Previously, they worked as criminals together for Intergang.	United States
2023–present	My Adventures with Superman	August 4, 2023	Brain	Gay	Brain and Monsieur Mallah are a couple similar to their depiction in the comics. It is the first time that they are openly depicted as a same-sex couple in animation.	United States
2023–present	My Adventures with Superman	August 4, 2023	Monsieur Mallah	Gay	Brain and Monsieur Mallah are a couple similar to their depiction in the comics. It is the first time that they are openly depicted as a same-sex couple in animation.	United States
2023–present	Rubble & Crew	August 21, 2023	River	Non-binary	River is a non-binary skateboarder. River uses they/them pronouns. River is voiced by non-binary actor Cihang Ma.	Canada
2023–present	Skip and Loafer	April 4, 2023	Nao	Trans woman	Nao, the main character's aunt, is a trans woman, which is mentioned in the story. For example, in one episode, Mitsumi mentions that her aunt was assigned male at birth, and in another, she has to protect Nao from transphobic comments on the train.	Japan
2023–present	Work It Out Wombats!	February 6, 2023	Duffy	Lesbian	Duffy and Leiko are the adoptive kangaroo mothers of tarsier Louisa.	United States
2023–present	Work It Out Wombats!	February 6, 2023	Leiko	Lesbian	Duffy and Leiko are the adoptive kangaroo mothers of tarsier Louisa.	United States

== 2024 ==
Duration	Show title	Character debut date	Characters	Identity	Notes	Country
2024	Cherry Magic! Thirty Years of Virginity Can Make You a Wizard?!	January 11, 2024	Yuichi Kurosawa	Gay	Kurosawa, a beautiful and well-liked man (in the office), has a crush on the protagonist Kiyoshi Adachi, who can hear the thoughts of those he touches. In the fifth episode, he confesses his love to Adachi. They later begin dating.	Japan
2024	Cherry Magic! Thirty Years of Virginity Can Make You a Wizard?!	January 11, 2024	Kiyoshi Adachi	Gay	In the seventh episode, Adachi begins dating Kurosawa. In the 11th episode, while on a work trip in Nagasaki, he writes a letter to Kurosawa admitting his romantic feelings. Later, they both talk about their feelings for one another in a Nagasaki hotel room. Adachi notes some of the things he likes about Kurosawa, and they kiss each other, then lie on the bed together, with implication they had sexual intercourse together.	Japan
2024	Cherry Magic! Thirty Years of Virginity Can Make You a Wizard?!	January 11, 2024	Masato Tsuge	Gay	In the 11th episode, he confesses his love for a part-time deliveryman and dancer named Minato, while Minato reciprocates these feelings, with both hugging one another.	Japan
2024	Cherry Magic! Thirty Years of Virginity Can Make You a Wizard?!	January 11, 2024	Minato Wataya	Gay	In the 11th episode, he confesses his love for a part-time deliveryman and dancer named Minato, while Minato reciprocates these feelings, with both hugging one another.	Japan
2024	Jellyfish Can't Swim in the Night	April 7, 2024	Kiui Watase	Non-binary	In the 11th episode, she publicly expresses her gender fluidity, criticizing those who want her to behave in a "normal" manner, unashamed for embracing what she likes, and is supported by Yoru. She also is Mahiru's childhood friend and lends her talents to JELEE as its video editor and mixer.	Japan
2024	Senpai Is an Otokonoko	July 5, 2024	Saki Aoi	Queer	Saki is a high school student who is in love with her senior named Makoto. Although her exact sexuality is never stated, she openly admits that her crush's gender makes no difference to her when it is revealed that Makoto is actually a boy and not a girl. In the anime, she accepts Makoto's identity and embraces it. At first, she feels she has to act like she has a "certain kind of romantic attraction" toward him and resonates with his struggles to make connections with others. In the film sequel, Senpai Is an Otokonoko: Clear After the Rain, Saki confesses her love to Makoto, and they begin dating.	Japan
2024	Senpai Is an Otokonoko	July 5, 2024	Makoto Hanaoka	Queer	He is a second-year student who is a crossdresser and is often judged by many around him for his choice to dress up as a woman, which he keeps secret from his mother. Initially, he does not like the idea of falling in love, and constantly pushes away Aoi, who confessed her love to him. As the story progresses, his views on love begin to change. His friend Ryuji also loves him, and for a short period, both date one another. In the film sequel, Senpai Is an Otokonoko: Clear After the Rain, Saki confesses her love to him, and they begin dating. Author of the manga, Pom, described Makoto as someone who "likes cute things, so he just dresses up as a woman, [and is]...a boy on the inside."	Japan
2024	Senpai Is an Otokonoko	July 5, 2024	Ryuji Taiga	Queer	Ryuji is a high school boy who has a crush on his male childhood best friend, Makoto. Although he repeatedly explores his feelings and the potential impact of Makoto's femininity on his attraction to him throughout the story, Ryuji eventually admits that he loves Makoto as an other boy despite his androgyny. He later attempts to reject his love for Makoto, feeling it will be a burden, but Makoto accepts his feelings, even though he has internalized homophobia.	Japan
2024	Starship Q Star	February 6, 2024	Aurelia	Bisexual	Aurelia and Sim are the co-captains of the starship Q Star which has an all-woman and non-binary crew. The two are in an on-again-off-again relationship. It was confirmed that Aurelia is bisexual on Instagram comment. Sim is voiced by non-binary actor Drey Mendez.	Australia
2024	Starship Q Star	February 6, 2024	Sim	Lesbian	Aurelia and Sim are the co-captains of the starship Q Star which has an all-woman and non-binary crew. The two are in an on-again-off-again relationship. It was confirmed that Aurelia is bisexual on Instagram comment. Sim is voiced by non-binary actor Drey Mendez.	Australia
2024	Starship Q Star	February 6, 2024	Mo	Pansexual	Mo is the medical officer and Solaris is the engineering specialist of the starship Q Star. In episode 2, they are teasing each other. It was confirmed that Mo is pansexual and Solaris is queer on an Instagram comment. Solaris is voiced by non-binary actor Isha Menon.	Australia
2024	Starship Q Star	February 6, 2024	Solaris	Queer	Mo is the medical officer and Solaris is the engineering specialist of the starship Q Star. In episode 2, they are teasing each other. It was confirmed that Mo is pansexual and Solaris is queer on an Instagram comment. Solaris is voiced by non-binary actor Isha Menon.	Australia
2024	Starship Q Star	February 6, 2024	Dusty	Lesbian	Dusty is the pilot of the starship Q Star. It was confirmed that Dusty is a lesbian on Instagram comment. Dusty is voiced by non-binary actor Sunanda Sachatrakul.	Australia
2024	The Fairly OddParents: A New Wish	May 17, 2024	Winn Harper	Non-binary	A cool, purple-haired elementary schooler fond of skateboarding and one of Hazel Wells' friends. Winn is non-binary and uses they/them pronouns, with one character saying in the episode "Fly," "That's Winn. They're cool, you don't stand a chance." Winn is voiced by non-binary actor Iris Menas.	United States
2024	Twilight of the Gods	September 19, 2024	Sigrid	Bisexual	Sigrid is a half-giant who enacts revenge on the Norse gods. In the episode "Now Hear Of...", Sigrid has a threesome with Leif and Thyra.	United States
2024	Twilight of the Gods	September 19, 2024	Thyra	Bisexual	Thyra is an emissary of the Vanir. In the episode "Now Hear Of...", Thyra has a threesome with Leif and Sigrid.	United States
2024	Twilight of the Gods	September 19, 2024	Egill	Bisexual	Egill is a former slave. In the episode "Heretic Spear", he has a three-way with a man and a woman.	United States
2024	Twilight of the Gods	September 19, 2024	Seid-Kona	Trans woman	Seid-Kona is a prophet. She is also a transgender woman who has a "flirtation" with Egill during the series. Seid-Kona is voiced by transgender actress Jamie Clayton.	United States
2024	Twilight Out of Focus	July 4, 2024	Hisashi Otomo	Gay	Hisashi is asked to star in a BL production when he himself is gay, something which his roommate, Mao, only knows. Although he never approaches Mao romantically, he accidentally mistakes Mao for his boyfriend, at one point, which he apologizes for the next day.	Japan
2024	Twilight Out of Focus	August 22, 2024	Shion Yoshino	Gay	Unlike Otomo, Yoshino has friends who supports him when he first declares his sexuality, when he announces it to the entire film club. Prior to this point, he is determined to find the "best" boyfriend for himself.	Japan
2024	VTuber Legend	July 7, 2024	Awayuki Kokorone	Lesbian	The series is based on a Japanese comedy novel of the same name about a lesbian Vtuber named Awayuki Kokorone ("Yuki") and her alcohol fueled adventures in filmmaking, with her lesbian attraction becoming a series punchline, and some characters making unwelcome sexual advances toward her.	Japan
2024	Welcome Home	April 9, 2024	Hiromu Fujiyoshi	Gay	Masaki Fujiyoshi is a stay-at-home husband, without any confidence, who is married to elite salaryman Hiromu. They have a two-year old son named Hikari. Masaki struggles with his mental health, while his family, and that of Hiromu, are not pleased with their marriage, and work to overcome their parent's objections.	Japan
2024	Welcome Home	April 9, 2024	Masaki Fujiyoshi	Gay	Masaki Fujiyoshi is a stay-at-home husband, without any confidence, who is married to elite salaryman Hiromu. They have a two-year old son named Hikari. Masaki struggles with his mental health, while his family, and that of Hiromu, are not pleased with their marriage, and work to overcome their parent's objections.	Japan
2024	Whisper Me a Love Song	April 14, 2024	Yori Asanagi	Lesbian	A third-year high school student, who serves as the vocalist and lead guitarist for the band SSGIRLS after their previous vocalist quit. Often seen as stoic by those around her, Yori enjoys singing while playing the guitar on the school's rooftop alone and collecting cute cat merchandise. Yori falls for Himari after her "confession", only to realize later that Himari was actually confessing admiration for her singing. However, she resolves to get Himari to reciprocate her feelings in time.	Japan
2024	Whisper Me a Love Song	April 14, 2024	Himari Kino	Lesbian	A first-year high school student, an energetic girl who falls in love with Yori's singing on her first day of school. She confesses her admiration to Yori, who misinterprets her feelings as romantic. However, she agrees to spend time together to see if she can come to feel the same way as Yori, considering Yori's offer to date her in the second episode. She admits her feelings for Yori at the end of the sixth episode and asks her out, which Yori accepts.	Japan
2024	Whisper Me a Love Song	April 14, 2024	Aki Mizuguchi	Lesbian	A cheerful third-year student and the bassist for SSGIRLS. She is Yori's best friend and tries to support her in winning over Himari. She hides the fact she has romantic feelings for Yori herself, as first indicated in the second episode of the series and in later episodes, even challenging Himari on her feelings for Yori, while threatening to take Yori away from her.	Japan
2024–2025	Bea's Block	February 15, 2024	Mr. K	Gay	Mr. K and Matt are the fathers of Lexi.	United States
2024–2025	Bea's Block	February 15, 2024	Matt	Gay	Mr. K and Matt are the fathers of Lexi.	United States
2024–2025	Let's Go, Bananas!	April 19, 2024	Daddy and Papa Banana	Gay	Daddy and Papa Banana are an ape same-sex couple who have a daughter Apple, whom they raised together. In the episode "The Big Pop", Papa Banana initially wanted to proposed to Daddy Banana but the latter ends up being the one to propose to him. The couple officially get married in the following episode "A Very Bananas Wedding". Papa Banana is voiced by gay actor Jonathan Tan, and Daddy Banana is voiced by non-binary queer actor Kareem Vaude.	Canada
2024–2025	Mighty MonsterWheelies	October 14, 2024	Sonnie Dracula	Non-binary	Sonnie Dracula is a Dracula motorcycle/helicopter combo. Sonnie is non-binary and uses they/them pronouns. Sonnie Dracula is voiced by transgender actress Cal Brady.	United States
2024–2025	Primos	July 25, 2024	Julita "Lita" Perez	Bisexual	Lita Perez is Tater's eldest cousin. She wants to be a rock star. In the episode "Summer of Heart Eyes", Lita is revealed to be bisexual as she has been in relationships with both boys and girls and is currently dating a non-binary person named Alex (voiced by non-binary actor Blu del Barrio). The episode was nominated for a GLAAD Media Award for Outstanding Kids & Family Programming or Film – Animated.	United States
2024–2025	Primos	September 11, 2024	Alex	Non-binary	Lita Perez is Tater's eldest cousin. She wants to be a rock star. In the episode "Summer of Heart Eyes", Lita is revealed to be bisexual as she has been in relationships with both boys and girls and is currently dating a non-binary person named Alex (voiced by non-binary actor Blu del Barrio). The episode was nominated for a GLAAD Media Award for Outstanding Kids & Family Programming or Film – Animated.	United States
2024–2025	The Second Best Hospital in the Galaxy	February 22, 2024	Dr. Klak	Queer	Dr. Klak is an alien surgeon. In the third episode "Tomorrow's Death is Yesterday's Problem", Klak was in a relationship with another alien woman named Slug Girl when she was in college. Klak was in an on-again-off-again relationship with Dr. Azel. In the second season, Klak moves on from Azel and gets into a relationship with an alien doctor named Zypha.	United States
2024–2025	The Second Best Hospital in the Galaxy	February 22, 2024	Dr. Azel	Genderless	Dr. Azel is Dr. Klak's on-again-off-again lover. Azel is a genderless alien who uses they/them pronouns. Azel is voiced by non-binary singer and songwriter Sam Smith. In the second season, Azel and Klak's relationship comes to an end.	United States
2024–2025	The Second Best Hospital in the Galaxy	February 22, 2024	Dr. Vlam	Pansexual	Dr. Vlam is a female robot who has had multiple relationships with people of all genders.	United States
2024–2025	The Second Best Hospital in the Galaxy	May 27, 2025	Zypha	Lesbian	Zypha is Dr. Klak's current girlfriend who appears in the second season. Zypha is voiced by bisexual comedian Abbi Jacobson.	United States
2024–present	Ark: The Animated Series	March 21, 2024	Helena Walker	Lesbian	Helena Walker is an Aboriginal Australian paleontologist who recently woke up on the ARK. She later gets closer to Meiyin Li, a Chinese rebel leader from the Yellow Turban Rebellion in the 3rd century who is feared throughout the Ark as the "Beast Queen". Both share a kiss in the sixth episode after Helena rescues Meiyin from the enemy camp.	United States
2024–present	Ark: The Animated Series	March 21, 2024	Victoria Walker	Lesbian	Victoria Walker was Helena's wife who died at some point. Victoria is voiced by trans male actor Elliot Page, who is queer and non-binary.	United States
2024–present	Ark: The Animated Series	March 21, 2024	Meiyin Li	Lesbian	She becomes close to Helena through the course of the series, teaching her fighting techniques and the way of the warrior. In the sixth episode, Helena participates in a rescue attempt of Meiyin from the enemy camp, with Meiyin grateful Helena came to her aid, and while escaping, they both share a kiss. In the game this series is based on, Ark: Survival Evolved she has a girlfriend named Diana Altreas.	United States
2024–present	Batman: Caped Crusader	August 1, 2024	Harleen Quinzel / Harley Quinn	Bisexual	For a few episodes of Batman: Caped Crusader, Harleen, an Asian-American psychiatrist, is in a relationship with police detective Renee Montoya, and they go on a date together. Later, Harleen leaves her, calling off their planned date and departing from Gotham in the episode "The Stress of Her Regard". In an interview with Variety, Harleen's voice actress, Jamie Chung, described the character as delivering her own form of justice, menacing, creepy, and "like a dominatrix", while show creator Bruce Timm said the relationship between Harleen and Renee seemed "kind of natural," while tempering Harleen's "vicious" tendencies In the second season, it is revealed that Renee and Harleen had been living together for a time. However, Harley realizes she is putting Renee in danger and eventually turns herself in to the police.	United States
2024–present	Batman: Caped Crusader	August 1, 2024	Renee Montoya	Lesbian		United States
2024–present	Hazbin Hotel	January 19, 2024 (Note: The pilot episode was released on October 28, 2019, but the series proper was released on January 19, 2024.)	Charlie Morningstar	Bisexual	Charlie is in an relationship with Vaggie, her girlfriend. Charlie is described as "gay" by news anchor Katie Killjoy in the pilot episode. Charlie was implied to be bisexual based on the colors of the bisexual pride flag appearing in a tweet from the show creator Vivienne Medrano's account. Charlie's sexuality is confirmed in the season 2 episode "It's a Deal", where Charlie clarifies to Katie Killjoy that she is bisexual, not a lesbian. Charlie was voiced by queer actress Jill Harris and her singing voice was pansexual actress Elsie Lovelock in the pilot and Vaggie is voiced by bisexual actress Stephanie Beatriz in the series.	United States
2024–present	Hazbin Hotel	January 19, 2024	Vaggie/Vaggi	Lesbian		United States
2024–present	Hazbin Hotel	January 19, 2024	Alastor	Asexual	Alastor, also known as the Radio Demon, is asexual. He joins the Hazbin Hotel as a staff member. Alastor was voiced by pansexual actor Edward Bosco in the pilot.	United States
2024–present	Hazbin Hotel	January 19, 2024	Angel Dust	Gay	Angel Dust is a pornstar, the first guest at the Hazbin Hotel, and engages in advances toward Alastor. Medrano confirmed him as gay and called him a "trashy unapologetically sexually open character." Angel Dust was voiced by asexual voice actor Michael Kovach in the pilot and bisexual actor Blake Roman in the series.	United States
2024–present	Hazbin Hotel	January 19, 2024	Husk	Pansexual	Husk is recruited to the Hazbin Hotel as a bartender. Merchandise for the series shows him in pansexual pride colors.	United States
2024–present	Hazbin Hotel	January 19, 2024	Sir Pentious	Bisexual	Sir Pentious is a guest at the Hazbin Hotel in the first season. Merchandise for the series shows him in bisexual pride colors.	United States
2024–present	Hazbin Hotel	January 19, 2024	Vox	Bisexual	Vox is a demon and Alastor's rival. He was confirmed to be bisexual by one of the animation directors for the series. In a post-finale Q&A with Vivienne Medrano and the voice cast, it was confirmed that Vox and Valentino are in an on and off relationship.	United States
2024–present	Hazbin Hotel	January 19, 2024	Valentino	Pansexual	Valentino is a Hispanic moth demon and Angel Dust's boss. He sexually abuses Angel Dust. He was confirmed to be pansexual by one of the animation directors for the series. In a post-finale Q&A with Vivienne Medrano and the voice cast, it was confirmed that Valentino and Vox are in an on and off relationship. Valentino is voiced by gay actor Joel Perez.	United States
2024–present	Hazbin Hotel	January 19, 2024	Velvette	Lesbian	Velvette is a female demon who is friends with Vox and Valentino. Merchandise for the series shows her in lesbian pride colors.	United States
2024–present	Hazbin Hotel	January 26, 2024	Lucifer Morningstar	Pansexual	Lucifer Morningstar is the ruler of Hell and Charlie's father. While Lucifer had been happily married to a woman for years and had a kid together; merchandise for the series shows him in pansexual pride colors.	United States
2024–present	Hazbin Hotel	January 26, 2024	Cherri Bomb (Note: First introduced in the pilot episode, which was released on October 28, 2019, before debuting in the series proper on January 26, 2026.)	Bisexual	Cherri Bomb is a friend of Angel Dust who joins the Hazbin Hotel. Merchandise for the series shows her in bisexual pride colors.	United States
2024–present	Hazbin Hotel	January 26, 2024	Sera	Lesbian	Sera is the major Seraphim of Heaven. Merchandise shows her in lesbian pride colors.	United States
2024–present	Hazbin Hotel	January 26, 2024	Emily	Queer	Emily is an angel and Sera's sister. Merchandise for the series shows her in queer pride colors.	United States
2024–present	Hazbin Hotel	February 2, 2024	Baxter	Queer	Baxter is an anglerfish-like demon and mad scientist who once worked for VoxTek. Merchandise for the series shows him in queer pride colors.	United States
2024–present	X-Men '97	March 20, 2024	Morph	Non-binary	In X-Men: The Animated Series, Morph, a mutant member of the X-Men with the power of shapeshifting, was presented as a male mutant who was referred to with masculine pronouns. Conversely, X-Men '97 presents Morph as non-binary and preferring they/them pronouns. Morph also shows romantic interest in Wolverine and confesses their love towards him while taking on the form of Jean Grey which was confirmed by showrunner Beau DeMayo. Morph is voiced by gay and non-binary voice actor J. P. Karliak. In the series itself, Morph is referred to with both they/them and he/him pronouns.	United States

== See also ==
- List of animated films with LGBT characters
- List of LGBT-related films by year
- List of yuri works
- LGBTQ themes in Western animation
- LGBTQ themes in anime and manga
