= List of animated series with LGBTQ characters: 2020–present =

The depiction of LGBTQ characters in animated series in the 2020s changed from the 2010s, accelerating. This included series such as Kipo and the Age of Wonderbeasts, and Adachi and Shimamura (2020), in 2020, Otherside Picnic. and High Guardian Spice in 2021, Dead End: Paranormal Park in 2022, Scott Pilgrim Takes Off, The Magical Revolution of the Reincarnated Princess and the Genius Young Lady, and I'm in Love with the Villainess, in 2023, Cherry Magic! Thirty Years of Virginity Can Make You a Wizard?! in 2024, and others across multiple years, such as The Owl House (2020–2023), Helluva Boss (2020–present), Adventure Time: Distant Lands (2020–2021), and Mobile Suit Gundam: The Witch from Mercury (2022–2023).

This list only includes recurring characters, otherwise known as supporting characters, which appear frequently from time to time during the series' run, often playing major roles in more than one episode, and those in the main cast are listed below. LGBTQ characters which are guest stars or one-off characters are listed on the pages focusing exclusively on gay, lesbian, non-binary, and bisexual animated characters, and on pages listing fictional trans, pansexual, asexual, and intersex characters.

The entries on this page are organized alphanumerically by duration dates and then alphabetically by the first letter of a specific series.

== 2025 ==
Duration	Show title	Character debut date	Characters	Identity	Notes	Country
2025	Baban Baban Ban Vampire	January 11, 2025	Ranmaru Mori	Gay	A 450-year-old vampire who works part-time at an old public bath, desires the blood of an 18-year-old virgin, and watches over the growth of 15-year-old Rihito Tatsun, son of the bathhouse owners, and attempts to prevent Rihito from losing his virginity.	Japan
2025	Bearbrick	March 21, 2025	Janet Hazard	Lesbian	Janet is a Bearbrick who wants to rekindle her dancing dream. She is one of Nick Hazard's mothers.	United States
2025	Bearbrick	March 21, 2025	Denise Hazard	Lesbian	Denise is Janet's wife and one of Nick Hazard's mothers.	United States
2025	Lazarus	April 6, 2025	Alexandra "Sashenka" / Christine "Chris" Blake	Queer	Chris is initially introduced to the show as a young female intelligence professional whose past is a mystery to both the viewer and other characters. Although she is shown as a friendly and caring "big sister" who looks after the other members of the main cast and clearly has extensive combat and espionage experience, her past and true identity remain unknown until Episode 8, where it is revealed that she is a Russian spy named Alexandra who faked her own death. She once wanted to escape the intelligence services with her lesbian lover and sister-in-arms Inga, whose handler she was. But when they were separated due to an accident, Chris decided to have plastic surgery and disappear to avoid Inga being eliminated due to suspicions from their superiors. Although beyond her relationship with Olga, Christina has also shown some interest in men and seemingly developed some feelings for Axel at the end of the show, her specific sexuality is never commented on and is left up to the viewer at the end of the show.	Japan
2025	Mermicorno: Starfall	January 30, 2025	Baby Bones' Mothers	Lesbian	In the episode "Ghost Town", the Mermicornos reunite Baby Bones, a baby Skeleofish, with his two mothers. His mothers returned in "A Sea of Stars, Part 1". The former was nominated for a GLAAD Award for Outstanding Children's Programming.	Canada
2025	A Ninja and an Assassin Under One Roof	April 17, 2025	Kuro	Lesbian	The leader of the escapees from the ninja village, who has memory-erasing powers, and fled to be with her lover, Yuriko, who lives in the civilian world. She introduces Yuriko to Satoko in the third episode as her significant other. She later gives, in the fourth episode, Satoko tips on getting along with her roommate, Konoha, who is cold toward her, and lets Satoko sleep over with her when Konoha kicks her out. The same episode implies that Yuriko is not her first girlfriend, but her previous partners are so forgettable that she doesn't remember their names, and is freeloading with her girlfriend, while engaging in gambling.	Japan
2025	A Ninja and an Assassin Under One Roof	April 17, 2025	Yuriko	Lesbian	Kuro's lover who is willing to offer moral support to her and her friends, though she repeatedly tries to rein in Kuro's frivolous spending on pachinko and other unnecessary objects. Her voice actress, Rumi Okubo, called her a "proper adult woman" who worries about Kuro.	Japan
2025	Oh My God... Yes!	March 9, 2025 (Note: The pilot episode was released on February 1, 2023, but the series proper was released on March 9, 2025.)	Sunny Green	Bisexual	Sunny Green is the main protagonist of the series. While she dates guys of various species; Sunny was also once in a same-sex relationship with a female robot named Strawberry. In the episode "Steel Ball Sounds Like a Very Dangerous Game", Sunny is shown to be very interested in male and female anthropomorphic animal strippers.	United States
2025	Oh My God... Yes!	March 9, 2025	Tulip	Bisexual	In the second episode, a robot girl named Strawberry breaks up with her after she slept with a man named Silken Tofu boy, and because she is overprotective, saying she loves her, but she doesn't feel safe around her, causing Tulip to lose it. She becomes briefly involved with a male spider, which she calls "Rutherford", afterward. He dies after biting Tulip. She is also friends with Ladi and Sunny (who had also dated Strawberry in the past).	United States
2025	Oh My God... Yes!	March 9, 2025	Ladi Olivia Sanchez IV	Bisexual	Ladi Olivia Sanchez IV is one of Sunny Green's friends. She is both interested in men and women.	United States
2025	Solo Camping for Two	July 18, 2025	Mizuki Hino	Bisexual	Mizuki, one of the female lead Shizuku's pair of best friends, openly identifies as bisexual and playfully flirts with her female friend. In episode 5 "The Path You Choose Yourself", she invites her to spend the night together after opening up her sexuality to Akihito and Shizuku.	Japan
2025	This Monster Wants to Eat Me	October 2, 2025	Hinako Yaotose	Lesbian	She has a wish to end her own life, after her family dies in an accident, but can't go through with it, and she meets a mermaid, Shiori Oumi, who tells her that her flesh and blood are especially delicious to yōkai. Shiori further declares that she will protect her from other yōkai until she is at her most delicious, at which point she will eat her, a fate which Hinako accepts.	Japan
2025	This Monster Wants to Eat Me	October 2, 2025	Shiori Oumi	Lesbian	A mermaid who says she will eat Hinako Yaotose when she's at her "most delicious" and is determined to ensure that Hinako won't die, or kill herself, yet.	Japan
2025	Women Wearing Shoulder Pads	August 17, 2025	Marioneta Negocios	Queer	Marioneta is a wealthy Spaniard who lives in 1980s Ecuador. Marioneta is mostly into women. However, she had a male lover in the past and is revealed to be the mother of her assistant Coquita.	Mexico
2025	Women Wearing Shoulder Pads	August 17, 2025	Espada Muleta	Lesbian	Espada is Marioneta's love interest.	United States
2025–2026	Digimon Beatbreak	March 29, 2026	Meto Enishida	Lesbian	Meto Enishida and Kanon Tsuwabuki are a Cleaner duo employed by Five Star member Rose Woodville. Meto and Kanon are in a same-sex relationship. The two are also an homage to the well-known fictional same-sex couple Sailor Uranus and Sailor Neptune.	Japan
2025–2026	Digimon Beatbreak	March 29, 2026	Kanon Tsuwabuki	Lesbian	Meto Enishida and Kanon Tsuwabuki are a Cleaner duo employed by Five Star member Rose Woodville. Meto and Kanon are in a same-sex relationship. The two are also an homage to the well-known fictional same-sex couple Sailor Uranus and Sailor Neptune.	Japan
2025–2026	There's No Freaking Way I'll be Your Lover! Unless...	July 7, 2025	Renako Amaori	Lesbian	She meets Mai Oduka, a popular school girl and joins her group of friends, but she pretends to be popular while she is usually a loner and socially awkward. She meets Mai on the rootftop of the school one day and Mai thinks she is going to take her own life, with Renako thinking Mai is her best friend. The following day, Mai confesses that she loves Renako and she suggests that they play a game to see which relationship is more suitable for them, either "best friend" or "lover". She later becomes girlfriends with Satsuki Koto on a temporary basis in hopes that it will help Satsuki and Mai reconcile, after she and Mei decide to continue their relationship-not-relationship. She also is deeply infatuated with Ajisai Sena, often referring to her as an "angel" in her internal monologue, practically confessing to her multiple times.	Japan
2025–2026	There's No Freaking Way I'll be Your Lover! Unless...	July 7, 2025	Mai Oduka	Lesbian	A popular school girl who confesses her love to Renako Amaori, after believing she saved Renako from taking her own life, and challenges Renako to a game whether they are lovers or best friends. Mai is committed to the former, while Renako is committed to the latter. After she assaults Renako in the third episode, hosts a party in an effort to find a new suitor, and apologizes for her behavior, she and Renako reconcile at the end of the fourth episode, deciding to continue their relationship-not-relationship, while Mai emphasizes the importance of respecting boundaries.	Japan
2025–2026	There's No Freaking Way I'll be Your Lover! Unless...	July 7, 2025	Satsuki Koto	Lesbian	As Mai's childhood friend and longstanding rival, she becomes girlfriends with Renako on a temporary basis to spite Mai by provoking her jealousy, and has a crush on Mei, while she begins developing feelings for Renako.	Japan
2025–2026	There's No Freaking Way I'll be Your Lover! Unless...	July 7, 2025	Ajisai Sena	Lesbian	Renako's friend and classmate. She harbors strong affections for Renako, which the latter reciprocates, although she only sees her as a friend, and Ajisai sees her more romantically. In the ninth episode, she and Renako hang out in her house, playing video games. Prior to this, both went on a shopping trip together in the third episode, invites her over (with Renako turning her down), and talks to her on the phone. Later in that episode, she runs away from home and is accompanied by Renako. They travel to a small seaside town and Ajisai plans to go to an inn she often visits with her family, so they can visit a hot spring, and seeing Ajisai is insecure, Renako suggests they go to a different inn. In the next episode, they end up bathing together in an inn that Renako chooses.	Japan
2025–present	#1 Happy Family USA	April 17, 2025	Mona Hussein	Lesbian	Mona Hussein is the teenage daughter of the Muslim Egyptian-American Hussein family. She is initially a closeted lesbian. She is in a relationship with a white girl named Gina. Mona Hussein and Gina are voiced by bisexual actresses Alia Shawkat and Megan Stalter.	United States
2025–present	#1 Happy Family USA	April 17, 2025	Gina	Lesbian	Mona Hussein is the teenage daughter of the Muslim Egyptian-American Hussein family. She is initially a closeted lesbian. She is in a relationship with a white girl named Gina. Mona Hussein and Gina are voiced by bisexual actresses Alia Shawkat and Megan Stalter.	United States
2025–present	Common Side Effects	February 2, 2025	Agent Harrington	Lesbian	Agent Harrington is a DEA agent. In the second episode, Agent Harrington is revealed to be a lesbian as she falls in love with mycologist Amelia.	United States
2025–present	Common Side Effects	February 2, 2025	Amelia "Mushroom"	Queer	Amelia is a mycologist and Agent Harrington's love interest. She has a son from a prior relationship named Wyatt. Amelia is voiced by queer actress Shannon Woodward.	United States
2025–present	Hotel Inhumans	September 7, 2025	Danica	Lesbian	Danica is an assassin since she was a child and met Chetana after a mission, who was a maid at the target's location. She spares Chetana after finding out she was abused. Chetana decides the two should run away together and they later become a sniper-spotter duo. They live together and share one bed. They sit together and cuddle as they watch the Perseid meteor shower. She casually tells Chetana that she loves her.	Japan
2025–present	Hotel Inhumans	September 7, 2025	Chetana	Lesbian	Chetana serves as Danica's spotter. She was a maid at the location of Danica's target. She was spared by her after finding out she was abused. In the cour 1 finale "Another Sky 4", she confesses her love to Danica to which she laughs because she knew that a long time ago.	Japan
2025–present	Lil Kev	March 6, 2025	Darnell	Gay	Darnell and Omar are Uncle Richard Jr.'s friends from prison. They have been in a same-sex relationship ever since they were in prison. Richard is unaware of them being a gay couple.	United States
2025–present	Lil Kev	March 6, 2025	Omar	Gay	Darnell and Omar are Uncle Richard Jr.'s friends from prison. They have been in a same-sex relationship ever since they were in prison. Richard is unaware of them being a gay couple.	United States
2025–present	Long Story Short	August 22, 2025	Shira Schwooper	Lesbian	Shira Schwooper is the only daughter in the Jewish-American Schwooper family. In the show's present day, Shira is married to another woman Kendra Hooper who is also African-American and they have twin sons. Shira Schwooper is voiced by bisexual actress Abbi Jacobson and Kendra Hooper is voiced by queer comedian Nicole Byer.	United States
2025–present	Long Story Short	August 22, 2025	Kendra Hooper	Lesbian	Shira Schwooper is the only daughter in the Jewish-American Schwooper family. In the show's present day, Shira is married to another woman Kendra Hooper who is also African-American and they have twin sons. Shira Schwooper is voiced by bisexual actress Abbi Jacobson and Kendra Hooper is voiced by queer comedian Nicole Byer.	United States
2025–present	The Mighty Nein	November 19, 2025 (Note: The first episode was released on November 14, 2025, on YouTube for a limited time ahead of the series premiere date.)	Caleb Widogast/Bren Aldric Ermendrud	Queer	Caleb Widogast is a human wizard who uses fire-based magic. Caleb is queer. In the fifth episode "Little Spark", it is revealed that Caleb was once in a polyamarous relationship with Volstrucker spies Eadwulf and Astrid who are a man and a woman.	United States
2025–present	The Mighty Nein	November 19, 2025	Beauregard "Beau" Lionett	Lesbian	Beauregard "Beau" Lionett is a human monk who is part of the Cobalt Soul. She is a lesbian.	United States
2025–present	The Mighty Nein	November 19, 2025	Yasha Nydoorin	Lesbian	Yasha Nydoorin is an Aasimir barbarian. She is a lesbian. In the sixth episode "Many Gifts", a flashback is shown of Yasha and her deceased wife Zuala.	United States
2025–present	The Mighty Nein	November 19, 2025	Eadwulf Grieve	Bisexual	Eadwulf Grieve is a Volstrucker spy. Eadwulf is one of Caleb's two former lovers.	United States
2025–present	The Mighty Nein	November 19, 2025	Mollymauk "Molly" Tealeaf	Bisexual	Mollymauk "Molly" Tealeaf, is a Tiefling blood hunter who worked as a fortune teller. He is bisexual and genderfluid. Mollymauk is voiced by bisexual voice actor Taliesin Jaffe.	United States
2025–present	The Mighty Nein	November 19, 2025	Mollymauk "Molly" Tealeaf	Genderfluid	Mollymauk "Molly" Tealeaf, is a Tiefling blood hunter who worked as a fortune teller. He is bisexual and genderfluid. Mollymauk is voiced by bisexual voice actor Taliesin Jaffe.	United States
2025–present	Your Friendly Neighborhood Spider-Man	January 29, 2025	Nico Minoru	Bisexual	In this series, Nico Minoru is portrayed as Peter Parker's best friend. As in the comics, like Runaways, she is bisexual, teasing Peter that she will ask out his crush, Pearl Pangan, if he doesn't do so, and she is, also, a love interest for Peter.	United States

== 2026 ==
Duration	Show title	Character debut date	Characters	Identity	Notes	Country
2026	Botan Kamiina Fully Blossoms When Drunk	April 11, 2026	Botan Kamiina	Lesbian	Series protagonist and a first-year student at a local university who becomes friends with Ibuki Tonami, a third-year who is the supervisor of her dorm, and becomes more forthright when she becomes drunk. Both become friends, often sharing drinks. They later begin a romantic relationship in the series finale, when visiting Echigo-Yuzawa together.	Japan
2026	Botan Kamiina Fully Blossoms When Drunk	April 11, 2026	Ibuki Tonami	Lesbian	Series protagonist and a first-year student at a local university who becomes friends with Ibuki Tonami, a third-year who is the supervisor of her dorm, and becomes more forthright when she becomes drunk. Both become friends, often sharing drinks. They later begin a romantic relationship in the series finale, when visiting Echigo-Yuzawa together.	Japan
2026	Botan Kamiina Fully Blossoms When Drunk	April 11, 2026	Kanade Gujō	Lesbian	A graduate student originally from Gifu Prefecture who is currently in her first year of her master's degree. She has feelings for Ibuki and is disappointed in how Ibuki became close to Botan. She also has a crush on Botan.	Japan
2026	Botan Kamiina Fully Blossoms When Drunk	May 16, 2026	Chin-Lan Chang	Lesbian	A student originally from Taiwan. She develops feelings for Kanade Gujō and is aware of her crush on Ibuki Tonami.	Japan
2026	Does It Count If You Lose Your Virginity to an Android?	January 10, 2026	Akane Tsuda	Lesbian	A 28-year-old office worker who drunkenly and illegally buys an android for sex named Nadeshiko, hoping to help her clean her apartment. The next day, she finds she can't return this robot or tell her co-workers about it, so she and Nadeshiko begin living together.	Japan
2026	Does It Count If You Lose Your Virginity to an Android?	January 10, 2026	Nadeshiko	Lesbian	A beautiful android that has sex with Akane and gets closer to her as they live together.	Japan
2026	The Ghost in the Shell	July 7, 2026	Motoko Kusanagi	Bisexual	In the second episode, Motoko Kusanagi has sex with two women in a threesome in cyberspace. She is canonically bisexual in the anime's source material and Stand Alone Complex while implied as such in the 1995 film, by elements which were adapted into this series according to series director Moko-chan. She has an unnamed boyfriend who works for Section One and they have been dating for seven months, with both targeted by a bomb at their home where they live together in the episode "Dumb Barter".	Japan
2026	Go for It, Nakamura!	April 2, 2026	Okuto Nakamura	Gay	A closeted sixteen-year-old high school student who has a crush on his classmate Aiki Hirose. However, he is acutely introverted and has never spoken to him, only fantasizes about speaking to him. He eventually builds his confidence and grows closer to Hirose, who becomes his good friend.	Japan
2026	The Invisible Man and His Soon-to-Be Wife	January 8, 2026	Daichi Kikira	Gay	Daichi Kikira, a blunt and unsociable human man, has a partner named Kousuke Madaraito. In the third episode, at first he isn't sure how to describe him, but later reveals that Kousuke is his partner to his co-workers. Kousuke, according to official promotional materials, has been the partner of Daichi since high school.	Japan
2026	Roll Over and Die	January 9, 2026	Flum Apricot	Lesbian	In the manga's first volume, she grows romantically closer to Milkit, a fellow slave girl she saves. In the anime, she is thrown into prison by the sage of a hero's party, Jean, because she is getting too close to Cyrill Sweechka, a young female member of the hero's party. She escapes with Milkit, in episode 1, from prison, reluctantly saying she is the "master" of Milkit. Over the course of the series, she begins to develop romantic feelings for her.	Japan
2026	Roll Over and Die	January 9, 2026	Milkit	Lesbian	In the manga's first volume, Milkit grows romantically closer to Flum Apricot, a fellow slave girl who saves her. In the anime, she meets Flum in episode 1, when both escape prison. During the course of the series, she gradually comes out of her shell and develops romantic feelings for her new mistress.	Japan
2026	The Other World's Books Depend on the Bean Counter	January 6, 2026	Aresh Indolark	Gay	A knight captain who assists Seiichirou Kondou after he experiences a tonic overdose, using a healing spell on him. However, this does not help heal his condition due to his lack of magic tolerance, with physical contact, and sexual activity, between them the only treatment for Seiichirou.	Japan
2026	The Other World's Books Depend on the Bean Counter	January 6, 2026	Seiichirou Kondou	Gay	To support his intense work ethic, Seiichirou begins a habit of drinking energizing tonics, not realizing that this could be dangerous to his health. One day, he experiences a tonic overdose, and the knight captain Aresh Indolark uses a healing spell on him. However, this worsens Seiichirou's condition because he lacks a tolerance for magic, and the only treatment is for Aresh and Seiichirou to engage in sexual activity and physical contact.	Japan
2026	I Want to Love You Till Your Dying Day	July 7, 2026	Mimi Kagari	Lesbian	A mysterious girl who met Sheena by chance after returning from the battlefield. Despite her young appearance and carefree mannerisms, she is rumored to be the school's secret weapon that can never die. She possesses unimaginable power and has no hesitation in killing her enemies. She grows closer to Sheena Totsuki over the course of the series, even as she loves and welcomes death, contrasting with Sheena.	Japan
2026	I Want to Love You Till Your Dying Day	July 7, 2026	Ali Maud	Lesbian	She is usually with her roommate, Seiran Lidsey, and the pair has strong romantic bond.	Japan
2026	I Want to Love You Till Your Dying Day	July 7, 2026	Seiran Lidsey	Lesbian	She is usually with her roommate, Seiran Lidsey, and the pair has strong romantic bond.	Japan
2026	I Want to Love You Till Your Dying Day	July 7, 2026	Sheena Totsuki	Lesbian	She is the first student to meet Mimi Kagari and is disturbed by her cheerful disposition despite being covered in blood from the battlefield. She comes to learn more about Mimi once they are assigned as roommates, and slowly they grow closer, despite their different outlooks on their situation within their school.	Japan
2026	Young Ladies Don't Play Fighting Games	July 7, 2026	Aya Mitsuki	Lesbian	Aya becomes good friends with her fellow student, and idol, Mio Yorue, who is nicknamed Shirayui-sama, is a hardcore gamer girl. Over the process of the series, they grow closer to one another.	Japan
2026	Young Ladies Don't Play Fighting Games	July 7, 2026	Mio Yorue	Lesbian	Nicknamed Shirayuri-sama, she acts like a graceful and beautiful student at Kuromi Girls' Academy, an elite finishing school, but hides she is bad at studying and is an extremely dedicated gamer. She becomes friends with Aya, and over the course of the series she grows romantically closer to her.	Japan
2026–present	Avatar: Seven Havens	October 9, 2026	Jae	Gay	Jae is an Airbender and city patrol guard who travels with Pavi and Nisha. Through most of the first season, Jae is in a same-sex relationship with a nonbender city guard named Datu. In the episode "The Dome," Jae and Datu end their relationship, with Jae using his bending powers to defeat Datu.	United States
2026–present	Avatar: Seven Havens	October 9, 2026	Datu	Gay	Jae is an Airbender and city patrol guard who travels with Pavi and Nisha. Through most of the first season, Jae is in a same-sex relationship with a nonbender city guard named Datu. In the episode "The Dome," Jae and Datu end their relationship, with Jae using his bending powers to defeat Datu.	United States
2026–present	Dang!	September 8, 2026	Eunice Dang	Queer	Eunice Dang is an Asian-American woman who was living with her brother Andrew in New York City. Their lives get turned upside down when their more successful older sister moves in with them. In one episode, Eunice says that her female therapist calls her a narcissist but believes the therapist is only saying that because she is into her. Eunice is voiced by queer and non-binary actor Poppy Liu.	United States
2026–present	Dang!	September 8, 2026	Andrew Dang	Gay	Andrew Dang is Eunice and Ruthie's brother. He is gay, as Andrew blushed in front of a male bodega worker in one episode. Andrew is voiced by Andrew Law, a gay actor and creator of the series.	United States
2026–present	Dragon Striker	June 9, 2026	Odward Stonegarden	Gay	Odward is a member of the Gorotama team, The Knights. In the season 1 finale "Revelations", it is revealed that Odward was in a same-sex relationship with his former Bards teammate Casper Ferreiro before he quit the team.	France
2026–present	Dragon Striker	June 9, 2026	Casper Ferreiro	Gay	Odward is a member of the Gorotama team, The Knights. In the season 1 finale "Revelations", it is revealed that Odward was in a same-sex relationship with his former Bards teammate Casper Ferreiro before he quit the team.	France
2026–present	Dragon Striker	June 9, 2026	Lotus Daatura	Non-binary	Lotus is a member of the Gorotama team, The Roses. Lotus uses they/them pronouns.	France
2026–present	Get Jiro	October 4, 2026	Rose	Bisexual	Rose is the CEO of the Farm, a corporation that promotes veganism. She is into both men and women and is in a same sex relationship with a woman named Freddie.	United States
2026–present	Get Jiro	October 4, 2026	Freddie	Lesbian	Rose is the CEO of the Farm, a corporation that promotes veganism. She is into both men and women and is in a same sex relationship with a woman named Freddie.	United States
2026–present	Mating Season	May 22, 2026	Penelope	Lesbian	Penelope is a thick red fox. Penelope is a lesbian and the series starts with her getting over a bad breakup with a dog named Summer. Penelope is voiced by lesbian comedian Sabrina Jalees.	United States
2026–present	Mating Season	May 22, 2026	Summer	Lesbian	Summer is Penelope's dog ex-girlfriend from Canada. Summer is voiced by bisexual comedian Abbi Jacobson.	United States
2026–present	Mating Season	May 22, 2026	Zeke	Gay	Zeke is one of Fawn's ex-boyfriends. He comes out as gay. Zeke is voiced by bisexual comedian Drew Tarver.	United States
2026–present	One-Room TA	August 28, 2026	Uyun	Gay	A socially awkward kid and T.A. who becomes roommates with Jinhyeong, after confessing to him.	South Korea
2026–present	One-Room TA	August 28, 2026	Jinhyeong	Bisexual	He becomes roommates with Uyun and says he has a "specific fantasy" about physical intimacy, and begins getting romantically closer to Uyun.	South Korea
2026–present	Rafi the Wishing Wizard	February 9, 2026	Jake Martin	Gay	Jake and Dash Martin are Rafi's fathers. Jake is voiced by gay actor Kieron Richardson.	United Kingdom
2026–present	Rafi the Wishing Wizard	February 9, 2026	Dash Martin	Gay	Jake and Dash Martin are Rafi's fathers. Jake is voiced by gay actor Kieron Richardson.	United Kingdom

== 2027 ==
Duration	Show title	Character debut date	Characters	Identity	Notes	Country
2027	The Guy She Was Interested in Wasn't a Guy at All	January 8, 2027	Aya Osawa	Bi-curious lesbian	She develops a crush on the clerk of the record store she frequents, thinking it is a boy, even through she, generally, has no romantic interest towards men. She doesn't know that the store clerk is her classmate Mitsuki Koga. As the series goes on, the relationship between Aya and Mitsuki grows, as does their love for music.	Japan
2027	The Guy She Was Interested in Wasn't a Guy at All	January 8, 2027	Mitsuki Koga	Lesbian	A clerk at a local record store, who has a workplace persona different from how she acts at school, since she tries to maintain anonymity during work. She becomes acquainted with Aya, who also enjoys rock music, and even learns how to play the guitar. As the series goes on, they grow closer to one another.	Japan
2027	Miss Saturne	TBA	Tom	Gay	Tom is a gay teenager and friend of main character Mercy.	France

== See also ==
- List of animated films with LGBTQ characters
- List of LGBTQ-related films by year
- List of yuri works
- LGBTQ themes in Western animation
- LGBTQ themes in anime and manga
