= List of lesbian characters in animation =

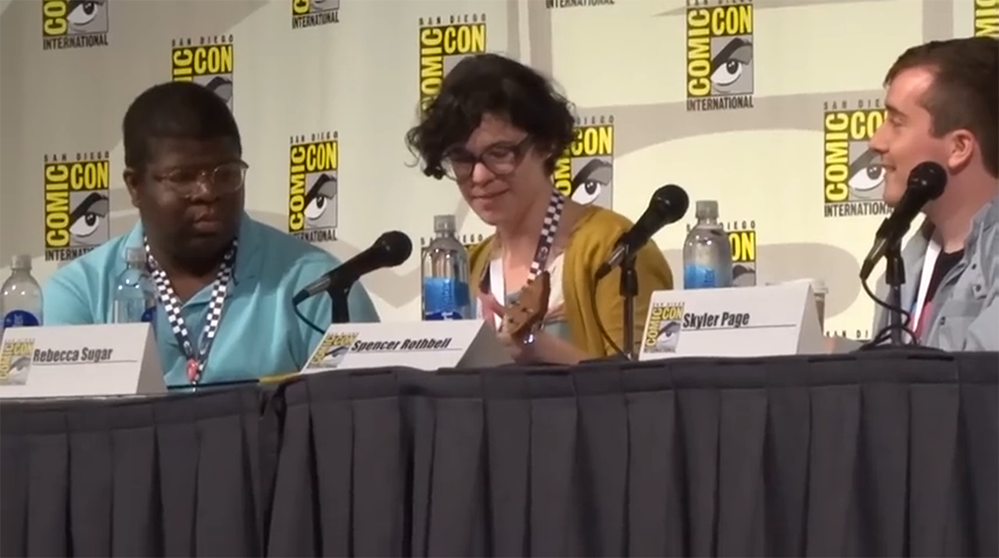
Ian Jones-Quartey, Rebecca Sugar, and Skyler Page at ComicCon in April 2014. Jones-Quartey, Sugar, and Page, were the creators of OK K.O.! Let's Be Heroes, Steven Universe, and Clarence, series which had lesbian characters either as recurring characters or protagonists.

This is a list of characters in animation that either self-identify as lesbian or have been identified by outside parties to be lesbian. Listed characters are either recurring characters, cameos, guest stars, or one-off characters in animated series, but not animated films. This article includes characters in Japanese animation, otherwise known as anime. There are also corresponding lists of bisexual, non-binary, and gay animated characters.

The names are organized alphabetically by surname (i.e. last name), or by single name if the character does not have a surname. If more than two characters are in one entry, the last name of the first character is used.

== From the 1980s to the 1990s ==
Characters	Title	Character debut date	Notes	Country
Juri Arisugawa	Revolutionary Girl Utena	April 2, 1997	Juri is explicitly in love with her female classmate, Shiori, in both the TV series and movie. She is described as "homosexual" by the creators in the DVD booklet. The commentary in the booklet indicated that Shiori also had feelings for her, but was too troubled and insecure to act on them in a healthy way.	Japan
Rei Asaka	Dear Brother	July 14, 1991	Rei has feelings for Nanako, a 16-year-old student who attends the same academy.	Japan
Patty Bouvier	The Simpsons	December 17, 1989	Patty officially came out when she was about to marry Veronica in the 2005 episode, "There's Something About Marrying" which was one of the episodes that carried the occasional warning of content that might be unsuitable for children. Like Dewey and Smithers, she is a recurring gay character. In "Livin La Pura Vida" Patty had a new girlfriend named Evelyn, voiced by lesbian actress Fortune Feimster.	United States
Cobalt	Fight! Iczer One	October 19, 1985	A combat officer who is in love with Sepia, a non-commissioned officer. Cobalt is in a romantic relationship with Sepia, occasionally kissing her in this "classic of early anime."	Japan
Tomoyo Daidouji	Cardcaptor Sakura	April 7, 1998	Tomoyo is in love with the protagonist of the show, Sakura, even loving what she wears. Unfortunately for Tomoyo, Sakura does not return her feelings, even though she does help her find her voice. At some point, Tomoyo confesses her love to Sakura, but Sakura misunderstands her, thinking she means "love" as a best friend, and Tomoyo says that she will explain when Sakura is older.	Japan
Ms. Ellen	South Park	February 11, 1998	In one episode, "Tom's Rhinoplasty", Chef reveals that the new teacher, Ms. Ellen, is lesbian. Some of her male students are attracted to her and do not understand what lesbians are, and try to "become lesbians" too, to get her attention.	United States
Jun Fudo	Devil Lady	October 11, 1998	Her "devilman" is awoken by Kazumi, a high school student. Over the course of the series, the relationship between Jun and Kazumi gradually progresses into an almost romantic one. Most notably in the last episode, titled "Man", Jun decides to forge her soul with the force from the Demons, which Kazumi also lets her absorb her to help in the final battle with Asuka.	Japan
Maya Ibuki	Neon Genesis Evangelion	October 4, 1995	Over the course of the series, it is implied that Maya gradually develops feelings beyond professional respect for Ritsuko which turns into a crush. She also sees Ritsuko before reverting into LCL during Human Instrumentality.	Japan
Iczer-1	Fight! Iczer One	October 19, 1985	Iczer-1 is in romantic and intimate relationship with Nagisa throughout the series.	Japan
Michiru Kaioh (Sailor Neptune)	Sailor Moon	April 19, 1994	Michiru is in a romantic relationship with Haruka Tenoh.	Japan
Nagisa Kanou	Fight! Iczer One	October 19, 1985	Nagisa is in romantic and intimate relationship with Iczer-1.	Japan
Seiya Kou (Sailor Star Fighter)	Sailor Moon	May 11, 1996	Seiya is assigned female at birth, however transforms into male when she's not fighting as a sailor senshi. Seiya falls for Usagi and attempts to go on a date with her in the episode "Seiya and Usagi's Heart-Pounding Date". However Seiya's feelings are only one sided as Usagi is in love with Mamoru as show in episodes like "Crusade for the Galaxy: Legend of the Sailor Wars."	Japan
Nanako Misonoo	Dear Brother	July 14, 1991	16-year-old Nanako falls in love with Rei "Saint-Juste" Asaka to which Rei slowly reciprocates as shown in episodes like "Into the Dream", and their relationship is one of the major driving plots of the series, showcased in episodes like "The Darkness in the Clock Tower" and "Under the Elm Tree." Rei's destructive relationship with Fukiko Ichinomiya leads her to be troubled, obsessed with death, and drug-addicted, as made clear in the "Relapse; Broken Heart" and "Pride, and the Final Meeting" episodes.	Japan
Toby Ranes	Superman: The Animated Series	February 7, 1998	Maggie Sawyer's romantic partner Toby Raynes is seen by her bedside in several hospital scenes and later Turpin's funeral service in the two-part episode, "Apokolips...Now!". Bruce Timm states in the commentary for "Tools of the Trade" that those scenes were the creators' way of acknowledging Sawyer's sexual orientation.	United States
Maggie Sawyer	Superman: The Animated Series	February 1, 1997	Maggie Sawyer's romantic partner Toby Raynes is seen by her bedside in several hospital scenes and later Turpin's funeral service in the two-part episode, "Apokolips...Now!". Bruce Timm states in the commentary for "Tools of the Trade" that those scenes were the creators' way of acknowledging Sawyer's sexual orientation.	United States
Alielle Relryle	El-Hazard	October 21, 1995	Alielle is presented as a comical character who makes other women uncomfortable because of her open attraction to them, in episodes such as "The World of Thunder." She has been described as a "midget flaming lesbian" who sees Princess Fatora Venus as her the "only object" of her affection as shown in episodes like "The World of Mindless Adventures."	Japan
Sepia	Fight! Iczer One	October 19, 1985	Combat officer and ruthless warrior, who is in love with Cobalt, later becoming distraught after her demise. She is in an intimate relationship with Cobalt.	Japan
Mariko Shinobu	Dear Brother	July 14, 1991	Mariko greatly admires Kaoru due to her strength and the emotional support she gives her as well, and at some point she admits to loving Karou, specifically in the episode "Comeback." Mariko distrusts all men because of her troubled family life: her father Hikawa is an erotica author who has an affair with an actress and later divorces Mariko's mother Hisako, who keeps her sadness bottled up as she raises Mariko practically on her own.	Japan
Kazumi Takiura	Devil Lady	October 11, 1998	Awakens the "devilman" inside of Jun and begins a romantic relationship with her, after she begins living with her.	Japan
Haruka Tenoh (Sailor Uranus)	Sailor Moon	April 19, 1994	Haruka is in a romantic relationship with Michiru Kaioh. This was changed in the original release of the English version of the anime, where they were made "cousins". In the re-release of the original anime however the English version keeps their same-sex relationship.	Japan
Fatora Venus	El-Hazard	May 25, 1997	An apparently open lesbian, 23-year-old Fatora is much like her primary lover Alielle in that she has an overdeveloped sex drive and little concern for the concept of "faithfulness" or even "disinterested", indicated in episodes like "The World of Mindless Adventures." While it is implied that she has had many other "once-off" lovers in the past, and is attracted to Kalia when she first appears in the episode "The Awakening of Kalia", she is fixated on Shayla-Shayla and Nanami Jinnai, trying to lure them into sharing her bed. In the episode "The Bride of Roshtari", the manages to fool Shayla-Shayla sufficiently that she manages to kiss her, naturally prompting a fiery explosion of fury when the priestess realizes who just claimed her first kiss. Fatora also has a crush on Gilda of the emperor's guards.	Japan
Irene "Rally" Vincent	Gunsmith Cats	November 1, 1995	She operates the titular "Gunsmith Cats" gun shop in Chicago and works as a bounty hunter, assisted in both activities by her housemate, former prostitute "Minnie" May Hopkins as shown in the episodes "Neutral Zone" and "High Speed Edge." Rally is an expert combat shooter and marksman with just about every firearm in existence and May is an explosives expert, knowing the inner workings of and many uses of all manner of explosive devices. May often teases Rally, who is also friendly with Becky Farrah, the latter giving her information on about the Chicago Underworld, noted in the episode "Swing High!	Japan
Ayako Yuuki	Variable Geo	January 29, 1997	Also known as Yūki Ayako, she is the series' sole lesbian character, among those with "lesbian tendencies" as one reviewer pointed out. In the game, while in the V.G. tournament hoping to win and give the prize money to charity, she meets and becomes infatuated with Satomi Yajima, a fellow fighter who has no interest in pursuing a romantic relationship with another woman. In the anime, she is approached by Satomi, who challenges her to a fight as shown in episodes like "Strengthening Of The Goddesses." Ayako accepts, hoping that Satomi will entertain her. At first, Ayako seems to have the advantage, confusing Satomi with her swift, graceful movements. She uses her fan's hidden blade to cut away at Satomi's clothing, then plants a kiss on her cheek when the other girl attempts to close in on her. She remarks on Satomi's beautiful skin, and invites her to "lose and show her the rest".	Japan

== In the 2000s ==
Characters	Title	Character debut date	Notes	Country
Futaba Aasu	Puni Puni Poemy	March 7, 2001	Poemy's classmate and best friend, and she is madly in love with her, a fact to which Poemy is oblivious, as shown in the first episode. In the final confrontation with the invading aliens, in the second episode, Futaba combines her power with Poemy's, and since Poemy is a representation of Earth, this act pacifies the planet's population, resulting in peace with the aliens. After this event, director Nabeshin casually mentions that Futaba is in reality the main character of the show. Her name comes from futa, the Japanese word for "two". Futaba is mostly a parody of Tomoyo Daidouji, the best friend of magical girl Sakura Kinomoto from Cardcaptor Sakura who is also a lesbian. Unlike Tomoyo, however, Futaba displays more extreme fantasies and lesbian arousal whenever she is with her friend.	Japan
Aer	Simoun	April 4, 2006	Aer immediately takes a liking to Neviril, and pushes to become Neviril's new pair after Amuria is lost. She loves Neviril a lot, but she is frustrated when Neviril is thinking of Amuria. In the end of the series, she and Neviril are in the new world, happily dancing together.	Japan
Alty	Simoun	April 4, 2006	She harbors an incestuous crush toward her older sister, Kaim, which causes her sister's hostility to her, as shown in the episode "Sisters." She may also have feelings toward others, such as Floe.	Japan
Amuria	Simoun	April 4, 2006	She and Neviril had been a pair, and romantically partnered, kissing multiple times, ever since Neviril first joined Chor Tempest in the show's first episode. Amuria was lost when she and Neviril attempted the Emerald Ri Mājon (an extremely difficult and powerful Ri Mājon maneuver, which was Amuria's idea to try) in the first combat action against Argentum.	Japan
Hatsumi Azuma	Yami to Bōshi to Hon no Tabibito	October 2, 2003	The adopted older sister of Hazuki Azuma, she develops an attraction to her, and kisses her in the show's final episode.	Japan
Hazuki Azuma	Yami to Bōshi to Hon no Tabibito	October 2, 2003	Hazuki Azuma is a tomboyish female with numerous female admirers, throughout her journeys, who develops a sexual attraction to her adopted older sister, Hatsumi Azuma, who reciprocates, as noted in episodes like "Hazuki" and "Quill." After Hatsumi disappears on her 16th birthday, Hazuki goes world-hopping in hopes of finding Hazuki, which her companions, a bird, and a woman named Lilith, known by the name of "Eve." Her love is deep-rooted, seemingly reciprocated through love letters from Hatsumi while she lived in Japan, and encounters a woman named Fujihime in a feudal Japanese world whom looks almost identical to Hatsumi, as indicated in episodes like "Hatsumi" and "Fujihime." In the final episode, "Lilith," they kiss each other, fulfilling Hazumi's wish.	Japan
Dana Bernstein	Rick & Steve: The Happiest Gay Couple in All the World	July 10, 2007	During the series, Dana and Kristen have a baby with the gay couple, Rick and Steve.	United States
Kirsten Kellogg	Rick & Steve: The Happiest Gay Couple in All the World	July 10, 2007	During the series, Dana and Kristen have a baby with the gay couple, Rick and Steve.	Canada
Bunny	Courage the Cowardly Dog	October 18, 2002	On Twitter, show creator John Dilworth confirmed that the one-off characters Kitty and Bunny are in love, although they couldn't explicitly show it at the time.	United States
Kitty	Courage the Cowardly Dog	October 18, 2002	On Twitter, show creator John Dilworth confirmed that the one-off characters Kitty and Bunny are in love, although they couldn't explicitly show it at the time.	United States
Canaan	Canaan	July 4, 2009	Two years before, Canaan, an elite mercenary with expert combat training, saved Maria from hoodlums during a trip somewhere in the Middle East. During this anime, both show romantic attractions toward each other, while Canaan saves Maria on multiple occasions. Canaan can sense Maria by using her synesthesia abilities. Later in the anime, Maria suggests sleeping with Canaan. In the end, both remain close even as they cannot "live side by side in Canaan's world" or in Maria's world.	Japan
Maria Ōsawa	Canaan	July 4, 2009	Two years before, Canaan, an elite mercenary with expert combat training, saved Maria from hoodlums during a trip somewhere in the Middle East. During this anime, both show romantic attractions toward each other, while Canaan saves Maria on multiple occasions. Canaan can sense Maria by using her synesthesia abilities. Later in the anime, Maria suggests sleeping with Canaan. In the end, both remain close even as they cannot "live side by side in Canaan's world" or in Maria's world.	Japan
Cassie Cryar	Star Wars: The Clone Wars	January 22, 2010	In February 2016, Pablo Hidalgo, a Lucasfilm creative executive working on the Star Wars franchise, and part of the Lucasfilm Story Group, which had worked on the series, revealed that Cassie Cryar and Ione Marcy, shown together in the episode "Lightsaber Lost," were "written as a couple in a relationship." Both characters only show up in that episode in the series.	United States
Melissa Duckstein	Queer Duck	2000	Melissa is Adam's sister. She is revealed to be a lesbian at multiple points throughout the series, in a relationship with Yvette, in episodes such as "Homo for the Holidays", and the movie.	United States
Virginia "Ginnie" Dunne	The Venture Bros.	July 6, 2008	Dr. Quymn's bodyguard and is very masculine, and reported "man-hater". In the episode "Dr. Quymn, Medicine Woman", she is shown to be a lesbian who is trying to convert Dr. Quymn, although she may have bisexual tendencies.	United States
Nina Einstein	Code Geass	October 6, 2006	She develops a lesbian obsession, and yearning, for the Third Princess of Britannia Euphemia after the latter helps Nine through a traumatizing hostage incident at Lake Kawaguchi Convention. Nina later masturbates to her picture as shown in the episode, "Battle at Kyushu."	Japan
Shizuru Fujino	My-HiME	September 30, 2004	She harbors a secret obsessive infatuation with Natsuki Kuga and they remove themselves from the tournament by killing each other, but are resurrected in the final episode, "Shining ☆ Days." Natsuki accepts Shizuru's feelings after giving Takeda a letter explaining her rejection.	Japan
Stephanie Foamwire-Putty	Moral Orel	February 20, 2006	Stephanie is a lesbian character who's revealed to have fallen in unrequited love with her old high school best friend, Kim Latchkey. Kim used Stephanie in high school to get Kim's future husband jealous by pretending that she and Stephanie were dating (though Stephanie believed at the time that it was real). Stephanie's father, Reverend Putty, points out that Kim never cared about her and helps his daughter move on from her, indicated in episodes such as "Closeface".	United States
Tomoe Hachisuka	Whispered Words	October 28, 2009	Tomoe is one of the classmates of Sumika and Ushio who is also a lesbian. She is in a relationship with another classmate, Miyako Taema, indicated in episodes like "4+1", and they kiss occasionally in the show. Tomoe is the only one able to 'control' her. As an openly lesbian couple, with Tomoe attempting to start a "Girls Club," while Miyako is bossy to boys, and end up spending more time together.	Japan
Chikane Himemiya	Kannazuki no Miko	October 1, 2004	Chikane has loved Himeko since they met, although (despite her jealousy of Himeko and Sōma's friendship) she does not admit it until much later, with Chikane's feelings for Himeko bordering on obsession.	Japan
Himiko	Shattered Angels	January 5, 2007	She has an emotional bond and connection to Kaon which is also depicted in the manga.	Japan
Erstin Ho	My-Otome	October 6, 2005	As a supporting character, she is in love with Nina, a major character in the anime, noted in episodes such as "The Ocean – Swimsuit + Disaster = ?", even as Nina has feelings for male characters like Sergey.	Japan
Yuki Ice-T (Hitomi Landsknecht)	Ice	May 27, 2007	Yuki, after meeting the series protagonist, Hitomi Landsknecht, the captain of the Guardswomen, tries to get them to kiss in the show's first episode. While this is denied, they grow closer by the end of the episode and through the rest of the series. In later episodes, they show their fondness for each other, especially Yuki for Hitomi, but is also reciprocated with both hugging each other in the last episode. The final episode culminates in Hitomi's death, trying to defeat the monstrosity and save Yuki.	Japan
Kyōko Ikumi	Sweet Blue Flowers	July 2, 2009	Kyōko is a reckless girl who has eyes only for Yasuko. She is in the same class as Akira and is a member of the drama club. She has been dubbed as Princess for her charm, and is also skilled in sewing, art, tennis and acting. Her mother pushes her to be engaged with a college student named Kō Sawanoi.	Japan
Kaori Izumi	Best Student Council	April 20, 2005	She is an assault squad rookie, and in Episode 3, "Payapaya in the Best Dorms", she admits she has a secret crush on Kanade Jinguuji and is jealous of Rino.	Japan
Sakuya Kamiyama	Candy Boy	May 8, 2008	Sakuya seeks out and stalks Kanade, saying that she's in love with her and will do anything to be with her. She pays Yukino with candies in exchange for photos and personal stuff of her sister.	Japan
Kaon	Shattered Angels	January 5, 2007	Kaon is reminiscent of Chikane Himemiya, her alter ego in Kannazuki no Miko, and she wants to protect Himiko (even at a cost to herself), as Chikane did for Himeko as shown in the episode "Crossroads at the End of Dreams." Kaon has her Absolute Angel mark on her left arm; at one point, Mika replaces Kaon's mark with her own so Kaon can only draw energy from Mika. Kaon's emotional bond with Himiko is interrupted, but her true nature resurfaces and her mark is restored when Himiko kisses her. This relationship was similar to what was depicted in the manga.	Japan
Kaori	Azumanga Daioh	May 13, 2002	Kaori has a one-sided crush on one of her female classmates, Sakaki. When asked by Osaka if she is gay, she says that her preferred term is "lesbian," before backtracking and explaining it as "one of those things peculiar to puberty", leaving Osaka confused.	Japan
Suruga Kanbaru	Monogatari	August 8, 2009	Self-identifying as a lesbian, her character has been criticized for constantly flirting with Arariji and talking about "becoming his lover," because it may imply she is bisexual.	Japan
Ushio Kazama	Whispered Words	October 7, 2009	Ushio is a naive girl madly in love with cute girls and gets one-sided crushes. She considers Sumika to be a very precious friend and often says that she is "cool", "not cute" and "not her type". She is completely unaware of Sumika's feelings and her inner reaction to these words, but she develops feelings for Sumika, but is afraid to act on them.	Japan
Kaname Kenjō	Strawberry Panic!	April 3, 2006	Kaname is a domineering, forceful, and devious girl who is also on the student council for Spica, who is in a sexual relationship with Momomi Kiyashiki, meaning they are the first explicitly lesbian couple depicted in the series.	Japan
Momomi Kiyashiki	Strawberry Panic!	April 3, 2006	Kaname is a domineering, forceful, and devious girl who is also on the student council for Spica, who is in a sexual relationship with Momomi Kiyashiki, meaning they are the first explicitly lesbian couple depicted in the series.	Japan
Rio Kitagawa	Doki Doki School Hours	April 4, 2004	She is a lesbian and has stated on several occasions that she loves small girls, thus making it no surprise that she has a huge (and slightly sadistic) crush on Mika-sensei. She is constantly flirting with her, which often borders on molestation. She also does well academically, though she may fail the test on purpose if it means she will get to spend time with Mika-sensei.	Japan
Yume Kitaoka	Kanamemo	July 12, 2009	She is in a romantic relationship with Yuuki Minami, kissing her occasionally.	Japan
Shūyu Kōkin	Koihime Musō	September 9, 2008	A "close friend" of Sonsaku Hakufu, she is in a romantic relationship with her.	Japan
Natsuki Kuga	My-HiME	September 30, 2004	In the carnival it was revealed that Shizuru is Natsuki's most important person but because of Shizuru's psychotic rampage Natsuki began to doubt her feelings, as before that time, their love was only implied. Natsuki also loves Shizuru back, as shown in the episodes "A Girl's Most Important Event" and "A High School Girl ☆ Soars To the Heavens" for instance.	Japan
Lizzy	Lizzy the Lezzy	2006	The titular character of the web-television series. The series follows the life of this woman who talks mostly about her lesbian interests, representing the experiences of the series creator. Lizzy is sometimes joined by her best friend, Gary and they often talk about the problems they have with being homosexuals.	United States
Lizzy	Lizzy the Lezzy	2006	The titular character of the web-television series. The series follows the life of this woman who talks mostly about her lesbian interests, representing the experiences of the series creator. Lizzy is sometimes joined by her best friend, Gary and they often talk about the problems they have with being homosexuals.	Israel
Fumi Manjōme	Sweet Blue Flowers	July 2, 2009	Sweet Blue Flowers is a yuri anime which some have called the "pinnacle of yuri in anime," The main character, Fumi, comes out as a lesbian in episode 4, "Adolescence is Beautiful," and has feelings for Akira Okudaira.	Japan
Ione Marcy	Star Wars: The Clone Wars	January 22, 2010	In February 2016, Pablo Hidalgo, a Lucasfilm creative executive working on the Star Wars franchise, and part of the Lucasfilm Story Group, which had worked on the series, revealed that Cassie Cryar and Ione Marcy, shown together in the episode "Lightsaber Lost," were "written as a couple in a relationship." Both characters only show up in that episode in the series.	United States
Tomoe Marguerite	My-Otome	October 6, 2005	She harbors romantic feelings for Shizuru, as shown from the first episode of the series, with Tomoe having a dark side as revealed later in the series.	Japan
Megumi "Meg"	Burst Angel	April 6, 2004	She is the very best of friends with Jo and is 100% loyal only to her. Since Meg was once an orphan in New York City, Meg and Jo partnered and became bounty hunters together. While the anime tries to keep her relationship with Jo on the verge of friendly affection and still maintain a few subtle subtext, the three-volume manga prequel openly shows that Meg is experiencing a sexual attraction to her friend, fantasizing about their sex or even openly trying to seduce Jo. This is later referenced in the OVA sequel, "Jo and Meg Blues."	Japan
Mimi	Mnemosyne	February 3, 2008	Mimi is one of the main characters of the story, running a consulting business with Rin, known as Asogi Consulting and both are immortal. Throughout the series they have an intimate relationship, kissing each other in the beginning of the first episode, for example. Later on, Mimi appears to have grown close to the second informant (the informants being a group of women) as shown in the fourth and fifth episodes.	Japan
Yuuki Minami	Kanamemo	July 12, 2009	Yuuki and Yuuki Minami are a lesbian couple. They share an expressive yuri love, even kissing in public occasionally, at least four times over the course of the series.	Japan
Mariko Misono (Subaru)	.hack//sign	April 4, 2002	Subaru falls in love with An Shoj (Tsukasa), and both girls later make plans to meet in real life in the episode "Net Slum."	Japan
Kisa Misaki	Kagihime	January 3, 2006	After battling Arisu (despite not seeming to care about the stories before the battle) and being saved by Kiraha, she agrees to help collect the stories to be closer to Kiraha. Kisa has stockpiled items that have been owned or touched by Kiraha in a cupboard at her house that she collects whenever possible. She also tries to get Kiraha to eat her food; she is seen kissing the food beforehand and/or eating the food after Kiraha has taken a bite as to receive an 'indirect kiss' from her.	Japan
Anri Misugi	Sasami: Magical Girls Club	April 13, 2006	Anri often dresses in black, doing drawings and writing words, while having the ability to make each of those words into tangible symbols as shown in "The Dreaded An-An Notebook." She has a strong infatuation with Tsukasa and lavishes words of love and flattery on her constantly. A recurring joke in the series is that she loves Tsukasa so much that she gets nosebleed when she is around her.	Japan
Mo	The Goode Family	June 3, 2009	Mo and Trish are a lesbian couple as shown in the episode "A Tale of Two Lesbians".	United States
Trish	The Goode Family	June 19, 2009	Mo and Trish are a lesbian couple as shown in the episode "A Tale of Two Lesbians".	United States
Sumika Murasame	Whispered Words	October 7, 2009	Sumika is intelligent, tall with long black hair and athletically gifted. However, after realizing she was in love with Ushio she decided to quit karate in order to try to become "cuter". She secretly loves Ushio, but the fact that Ushio does not return her feelings at all makes her suffer, as shown in the episode "Whispered Words." Often she tries acting cuter, but has unsatisfactory results, and Ushio remains oblivious to Sumika's feelings.	Japan
Aoi Nagisa	Strawberry Panic!	April 3, 2006	When Aoi transfers to this school, she is smitten with Shizuma Hanazono, the schools' only Etoile. Over the course of series, she and Shizuma grow closer, as she faces a difficult decision.	Japan
Shizuma Hanazono	Strawberry Panic!	April 3, 2006	When Aoi transfers to this school, she is smitten with Shizuma Hanazono, the schools' only Etoile. Over the course of series, she and Shizuma grow closer, as she faces a difficult decision.	Japan
Mina Nakanotani	Air Master	April 1, 2003	Mina is hopelessly in love with Maki after meeting her in the first episode, "Fly! Air Master!" Although she constantly denies this, she kisses Miki in the show's third episode, and later takes her to a "love hotel." In the manga this anime is based on, Mina also develops a crush on Maki.	Japan
Yaya Nanto	Strawberry Panic!	April 3, 2006	Yaya, the roommate of Hikari, has feelings for Hikari and possibly Tsubomi. At the same time, Tsubomi may be in love with Yaya.	Japan
Tsubomi Okuwaka	Strawberry Panic!	April 3, 2006	Yaya, the roommate of Hikari, has feelings for Hikari and possibly Tsubomi. At the same time, Tsubomi may be in love with Yaya.	Japan
Neviril	Simoun	April 4, 2006	Neviril was very close to Amuria and she is devastated by the loss of her beloved partner. Even though she keeps being reminded of Amuria, she falls in love with Aer and they march to the new world together.	Japan
Haruka Nishida	Kanamemo	July 12, 2009	Haruka is attracted to girls, most notably ones under the age of 15, often making various advances on Kana, who fears her greatly in this regard. In one of the episodes, Haruka has a dream involving her sharing a kiss with Kana.	Japan
Amane Ohtori	Strawberry Panic!	April 3, 2006	Amane, is a local celebrity of Spica, often seen riding a white horse named Star Bright, which makes her seem more like a prince, and has a very masculine appearance, while she has a crush on Hikari, who also has a crush on her, showing her affection much in the way a man does for a woman. Hikari, on the other hand, is a physically weak girl who is fairly easy to be taken advantage of, much to her dismay.	Japan
Hikari Konohana	Strawberry Panic!	April 3, 2006	Amane, is a local celebrity of Spica, often seen riding a white horse named Star Bright, which makes her seem more like a prince, and has a very masculine appearance, while she has a crush on Hikari, who also has a crush on her, showing her affection much in the way a man does for a woman. Hikari, on the other hand, is a physically weak girl who is fairly easy to be taken advantage of, much to her dismay.	Japan
Akira Okudaira	Sweet Blue Flowers	July 2, 2009	Akira has a relationship with Fumi after a failed relationship with Yusuko, during which they kiss.	Japan
Liang Qi	Canaan	July 4, 2009	One of Alphard's top lieutenants, she affectionately refers to Alphard as an elder sister, who is so obsessed with admiring and idolizing Alphard to the point of being in love with her, even though Alphard does not reciprocate. Her obsession with Alphard leads her into a mad desire to kill Canaan, believing that Alphard will then pay more attention to her.	
Rojo	Ben 10	February 18, 2006	Rojo is a lesbian who leads a heavily armed biker gang. She and Azul, a member of her gang, are a lesbian couple as confirmed by series creator Duncan Rouleau.	United States
Azul	Ben 10	May 7, 2010	Rojo is a lesbian who leads a heavily armed biker gang. She and Azul, a member of her gang, are a lesbian couple as confirmed by series creator Duncan Rouleau.	United States
Miyuki Rokujō	Strawberry Panic!	April 3, 2006	Student council president of Miator, she seems to have unrequited feelings for Shizuma, despite the fact she will have a fiancé after she graduates.	Japan
Kaede Sakura	Kämpfer	October 2, 2009	Kaede's infatuation with Kämpfer Natsuru quickly grows into an obsession as she begins to make romantic and later erotic advances to Natsuru's female form, Kaede is shown to be strongly into female-female romance.	Japan
Kanade Sakurai	Candy Boy	May 8, 2008	Although sisters, her relationship with Yukino Sakurai is classified as "romantic" and in most episodes, the affection between the two is displayed as though they were dating, and they kiss in the show's seventh episode.	Japan
Yukino Sakurai	Candy Boy	May 8, 2008	She is affectionate toward her sister, Kanade Sakurai, with their affection is considered romantic. During the 2007 prologue, Kanade assumes Yukino is going out with Sakuya and hence, starts to distance herself from their usual closeness. However, Yukino gets upset and begs Kanade not to leave her. In the last episode, "Cherry Blossoms have Bloomed?," Kanade lays a peck on Yukino's face, surprising her, both again admitting their love for each other.	Japan
Sarah	Family Guy	January 6, 2006	Sarah invites her classmate Meg Griffin to join her afterschool club, as shown in one episode "Brian Sings and Swings". Only after accepting, Meg discovers that it is called Lesbian Alliance Club. Meg pretends to be lesbian for a while to make friends. It is shown that Sarah is attracted to Meg: when Meg visits her to confess that she is actually straight, Sarah mistakes Meg's sentences "I got to get something off my chest" and "I need to open up" as invitations to have sex.	United States
Hagino Senkoji	Blue Drop	October 2, 2007	She falls in love with a human, Mari Wakatake. Also known as Ekaril, Azanael blames her for the death of her female lover in an explosion five years earlier.	Japan
An Shoj (Tsukasa)	.hack//sign	April 4, 2002	An Shoji plays as a male character online due to the mental and physical abuse she suffers from her father, as she hoped that by playing as a male avatar she could distance herself from real life. As Tsukasa (her male avatar), she meets and falls in love with Subaru, the avatar of Mariko Misono, indicated in episodes like "Encounter." The two girls later make plans to meet in real life in the episode "Net Slum."	Japan
Souki	The Goode Family	June 19, 2009	Souki (also spelled as Suki) and Jenn are a lesbian couple as shown in the episode "A Tale of Two Lesbians".	United States
Jenn	The Goode Family	June 19, 2009	Souki (also spelled as Suki) and Jenn are a lesbian couple as shown in the episode "A Tale of Two Lesbians".	United States
Tamao Suzumi	Strawberry Panic!	April 3, 2006	Some stated that at the end of the anime, she "doomed to lives of loneliness and alcoholism," which is because her love for Nagisa, her roommate, is unrequited. Tamao's crush on Nagisa is what gives her a sense of determination to be around her. She is, also, highly literate as a member of the Literature Club who loves to write poems.	Japan
Miyako Taema	Whispered Words	October 28, 2009	She is in a relationship with Tomoe Hachisuka, and they kiss occasionally, with Tomoe as the only one who can control her.	Japan
Shiori Tsuzuki	Witchblade	May 3, 2006	She is a lesbian and is sexually infatuated with her employer, whom she affectionately addresses as "Sensei," and is a Cloneblade, shown in episodes like "Search" and "Past." During her fight with Masane, the hero of the story, her Cloneblade is critically damaged, meaning that her impulses and emotion become enslaved by the carnal drive of her powerful cloneblade. She quickly becomes a psychotic maniac, slaughtering, seeking fight and even raping for pure pleasure, succeeding, in the end, by unlocking the full powers of the Cloneblade albeit for a short moment, although this is not, ultimately, successful.	Japan
Mari Wakatake	Blue Drop	October 2, 2007	The anime revolves around an alien species consisting solely of females. Mari Wakatake and Hagino Senkōji, fall in love with each other, and later kiss one another.	Japan

== In the 2010s ==
Characters	Title	Character debut date	Notes	Country
Reggie Abbott	Twelve Forever	July 29, 2019	Reggie has a crush on Conelly, a 13-year-old schoolmate with whom she shares the same taste in imagining and creating stories, shown in the episode "Locked Out Forever". Due to the show's abrupt ending, Shadi Petosky, one of the executive producers, stated they will not be able to further explore that aspect of the characters and their relationship. Elsewhere, Petosky described Reggie as a queer character "coming to terms with her sexuality".	United States
Adora	She-Ra and the Princesses of Power	November 13, 2018	Adora is childhood friends with a catgirl named Catra. Throughout the series, there is romantic tension between them, especially after Adora defects to the Rebellion in season one. In the show's fifth season, after Adora and her friends save Catra, in the episode "Save the Cat", from Horde Prime, Catra joins the Rebellion, beginning her redemption arc. In the series finale, "Heart Part 2", Adora and Catra confess their love toward each other and kiss, with their love saving the planet of Etheria (and the universe) from Horde Prime's destructive plan, peace reigning over the universe. In the aftermath, Adora and Catra become a couple. According to series creator ND Stevenson, this romantic arc, known as "Catradora" by fans, was planned since the beginning of the series, working together with the crew, and they had a framework in place, with a plan for Catra and Adora to "reconcile in the last season", building to that goal throughout the show.	United States
Mei Aihara	Citrus	January 6, 2018	Yuzu is a self-proclaimed gyaru who becomes Mei Aihara's older stepsister, and had never dated. Mei is the beautiful and serious Student Council President who is stern, cold and composed, but has a short temper, and appears deadpan. Yuzu grows to love her, eventually admitting that she wanted to be with Mei. After both confessing their true feelings for each other she starts dating Mei in the show's final episode.	Japan
Yuzu Aihara	Citrus	January 6, 2018	Yuzu is a self-proclaimed gyaru who becomes Mei Aihara's older stepsister, and had never dated. Mei is the beautiful and serious Student Council President who is stern, cold and composed, but has a short temper, and appears deadpan. Mei was briefly the fiancé of her male homeroom teacher, until Episode 2. At first, Yuzu dislikes Mei, due to her aloof and manipulative attitude, but later Yuzu resented her after kissing her, and tries to understand her attraction to Mei. While the two of them have had very intimate moments with each other, for a time Yuzu thought it would be in Mei's best interests if she did not pursue her romantically, feeling that Mei needed a sister more than she needed a lover. However, she grows to love her, eventually admitting that she wanted to be with Mei. After both confessing their true feelings for each other she starts dating Mei in the show's final episode.	Japan
Akane Akaza	YuruYuri	August 13, 2012	Akari's older sister. She is secretly infatuated with Akari, with her room almost completely covered in photos of her, often doing various perverted things with her belongings when she is not around and reading lots of doujins about sisterly incest as shown in the episode "Sisterly Relations and Such."	Japan
Isabella "Stacks" Alvarado	Craig of the Creek	March 31, 2018	Stacks is a girl who hangs out at the library and does book reports for other kids. She is implied to have feelings for Kelsey. The season four episode "Fire and Ice" focuses on their relationship and she confesses her love to Kesley.	United States
Akari Amano	Ms. Vampire Who Lives in My Neighborhood.	October 5, 2018	Akari meets Sophie Twilight, a vampire, in the forest, is entranced, and takes up residence at Sophie's house.	Japan
Amaya	The Dragon Prince	November 22, 2019	Amaya is a deaf maternal aunt of Callum and Ezran who communicates in sign language, and commander of a Katolian outpost at the Breach. Janai is a Sunfire Elf warrior and the younger sister of their queen Khessa. On February 28, 2020, Devon Giehl, lead writer of The Dragon Prince, said that the writers intended for the romantic interest between Amaya and Janai to start at the end of season 3, and explicitly confirmed them as lesbian characters who like each other.	United States
Ilia Amitola	RWBY	January 7, 2017	Ilia confessed that she has held onto romantic feelings for her former-current-best friend Blake Belladonna in the episode "Alone Together". Miles Luna, one of the showrunners, confirmed her sexuality in a 2018 Reddit AMA.	United States
Annika	The Dragon Prince	February 15, 2019	In the second season, Queen Aanya is shown as the ruler of the Kingdom of Duren. Her mothers, Annika and Neha, the Queens of Duran, died nine years prior to the beginning of the series while fighting Thunder, the Dragon King, as shown in the episode "Breaking the Seal".	United States
Misa Aoi	Kandagawa Jet Girls	October 8, 2019	She lives with a girl named Rin Namiki in Tokyo, going to college with her, and later flirts with Rin. After winning the Kandagawa Cup, Rin tells Misa she loves her (which other contestants say is "forward") and wishes they be "together forever," a sentiment Misa reciprocates in episode 12. In the show's OVA, Rin wants to advance their relationship further to be more romantic while Misa is embarrassed by her advances.	Japan
Zola Axberg	Cross Ange	November 1, 2014	She often fondles other women or has sex with them.	Japan
Bismuth	Steven Universe	August 4, 2016	In the episode "Bismuth Casual", where Pearl invites Bismuth to the roller rink to "set her up" with some of her friends, Bismuth admits to having a crush on Pearl to Steven, as they form a "deep bond" together. This is hinted at through her flirting toward Pearl in the episode "Bismuth".	United States
Kitty Boon	Mysticons	August 28, 2017	Kitty Boon, the head of the Pink Skulls sky pirate gang, is romantically involved with Mysticon and street kid Zarya Moonwolf. Although there was no kiss between the characters, due to the objection of a creative partner, the creative team, with the support of series creator Sena Jara, kept the integrity of their love story in the series,	Canada
Kitty Boon	Mysticons	August 28, 2017	Kitty Boon, the head of the Pink Skulls sky pirate gang, is romantically involved with Mysticon and street kid Zarya Moonwolf. Although there was no kiss between the characters, due to the objection of a creative partner, the creative team, with the support of series creator Sena Jara, kept the integrity of their love story in the series,	United States
Gien Bunchō	Koihime Musō	April 22, 2010	A good-natured and boisterous girl, whose real name is En'ya, she joins Ryūbi on the quest to look for medicine due to her romantic feelings for Ryūbi, who (according to Gengan) is almost like the splitting image of her deceased older sister, shown in episodes such as "Gien, Falls In Love At First Sight."	Japan
Catra	She-Ra and the Princesses of Power	November 13, 2018	A catgirl who is childhood friends with Adora. Throughhout the series, there's romantic tension, and during the show's final season, Catra begins her redemption arc after Adora and her friends save her. In the series finale, "Heart Part 2", Adora and Catra confess their love toward each other and kiss, with their love saving the planet of Etheria (and the universe) from Horde Prime's destructive plan, resulting in Adora and Catra becoming a couple. This romantic arc was planned since the beginning of the series, according to ND Stevenson, the series creator.	United States
Chloé	Star vs. the Forces of Evil	April 28, 2019	Chloé is a lesbian French girl, presented in the episode "Britta's Tacos", who is in the relationship with Jackie-Lynn Thomas, an American girl who is revealed to be bisexual after breaking up with her ex-boyfriend, Marco Diaz, due to his strong feelings for the series' protagonist, Princess Star Butterfly.	United States
Cocona	Flip Flappers	October 6, 2016	Cocona is coming to terms with her sexuality and realizes she loves Papika.	Japan
Saphron Cotta-Arc	RWBY	December 8, 2018	Saphron, the sister of Jaune Arc, and her wife, Terra, have a son named Adrian, with all three making their debut in the seventh episode of Volume 6, "The Grimm Reaper". In later episodes, Ruby, Weiss, Blake, Yang, Juane, Nora, Rin, Qrow, and Maria stay at their house within Argus, attempting to contact the Atlas military. Additionally, Saphron helps them search for Oscar in the episode "Lost" while Terra helps Blake and Yang in the episode "Stealing from the Elderly", and are featured in the last episode of Volume 6, "Our Way".	United States
Terra Cotta-Arc	RWBY	December 8, 2018		United States
Courtney	Craig of the Creek	April 16, 2018	In a romantic relationship with Tabitha, as shown in their debut episode. Also in the episode "The Haunted Dollhouse", their feelings for each other are confirmed and they kiss in the end.	United States
Constance Beatrice "Connie" Cunaman	Brickleberry	October 9, 2012	Connie admits she is a lesbian; in the episode "Gay Bomb", her strength is dubbed by her as "lesbian strength". She is obsessed with Ethel, turned away by her Evangelical parents for being a homosexual, and when Connie gets excited, her vagina makes growling noises.	United States
D.D. Danger	Danger & Eggs	June 30, 2017	D.D., the protagonist, is an imaginative thrill seeker, and her best friend, a lawful good, safety-first anthropomorphic egg named Phillip, with both experiencing a series of enjoyably chaotic adventures as "they do stuff". On July 27, 2020, show creator, Petosky described the show as about a "gender-free female lesbian child and her giant large-gamete friend," referring to D.D. Danger and Phillip.	United States
Devin	American Dad!	February 23, 2015	Devin is a member of a lesbian roller derby team.	United States
Velma Dinkley	Scooby Doo! Mystery Incorporated	April 5, 2010	The producer of this series, Tony Cervone, confirmed that Velma is a lesbian while James Gunn, who wrote the screenplays of Scooby-Doo and Scooby-Doo 2: Monsters Unleashed, she was "explicitly gay." She has feelings for Marcie "Hot Dog Water" Fleach. Velma also appeared in Scooby-Doo, Where Are You!, Shaggy & Scooby-Doo Get a Clue!, and What's New, Scooby-Doo?.	United States
Jenny Dolittle	Bodacious Space Pirates	January 29, 2012	Vice-president of the Space Yacht Club, a skilled hacker, and troublemaker, her lover is Lynn Lambretta. She also appears with Lynn in the film which follows the series, Bodacious Space Pirates: Abyss of Hyperspace.	Japan
Sweetie Drops	My Little Pony: Friendship Is Magic	October 10, 2010	In the season 9 episode "The Big Mac Question", she proposes to Lyra Heartstrings, with their ship known as "Lyrabon", and in the series finale, "The Last Problem", they are shown as married in a newspaper clipping.	United States
Edie	Doc McStuffins	August 5, 2017	In a romantic relationship with Thea, and is the parent of two doll children with her. Edie is voiced by lesbian actress Portia de Rossi.	United States
Ash Graven	Final Space	June 22, 2019	In the eighth episode of Season 3, "Forgiveness," Ash meets a genderless being named Evra, voiced by Jasmin Savoy Brown. Evra becomes Ash's friend and helps her "take her anger out," with both sitting and watching a formation of lights like the aurora borealis together. Her relationship with Evra makes clear her sexual orientation, in addition to being angry at a man named Jordan Hammerstein, in the episode "Arachnitects," for rejecting her at prom. Rogers said in a podcast about the episode "Forgiveness" that David Sacks, who wrote the episode, came from a place of "two souls connecting to each other" and noted that if the show gets a fourth season, they would expand on the relationship between Evra and Ash.	United States
Rain Hasumi	Valkyrie Drive: Mermaid	October 24, 2015	Rain and Lady J are passionate lovers.	Japan
Lyra Heartstrings	My Little Pony: Friendship Is Magic	October 10, 2010	Sweetie Drops proposes to her in the season 9 episode "The Big Mac Question", she proposes to Lyra Heartstrings, and in the series finale, "The Last Problem", she and Sweetie Drops are shown as married in a newspaper clipping.	United States
Hii-chan	Yuri Seijin Naoko-san	December 10, 2010	She is Misuzu's best friend who wears glasses. In the 2010 OVA, while Naoko-san discusses about erotic magazines, Hii-chan overhears and fantasizes a scenario with herself and Misuzu. In the following OVA, she's revealed to be harboring a deranged crush on Misuzu.	Japan
Akira Hiragi	Valkyrie Drive: Mermaid	October 31, 2015	The benevolent Governor of Mermaid, and the founder of Wärter (German for "keeper(s)"), the island's peace-keeping force. While believed by everyone on the island to be the only male resident on Mermaid, she is actually a woman asked by her mother to act like a man in order to stay safe. For physical protection, her mother also provided her with an artificial Extar named Sri. Only Torino and Mirei knew her true gender until she was exposed by Momoka.	Japan
Aunt Holiday	My Little Pony: Friendship Is Magic	June 15, 2019	Aunt Holiday and Auntie Lofty are aunts to the young pegasus Scootaloo and are her guardians while Scootaloo's parents are away. The pair had first been introduced in storybooks based on the series, but were fully introduced in a ninth-season episode, "The Last Crusade". The pair were identified as a lesbian couple by one of the show runners, Michael Vogal. According to Vogel, he and writers Nicole Dubac and Josh Haber agreed to establish the two in their first appearance in the book as a lesbian couple, though without explicitly stating as such, so that they could establish this within the shown itself. Vogel stated they felt they could show that what elements make up a family is only determined by love, and not traditional roles.	United States
Huntara	She-Ra and the Princesses of Power	August 2, 2019	In her debut episode, "Huntara", she is seen flirting with a waitress in a bar. She also has been described by some as butch.	United States
Chitose Ikeda	YuruYuri	July 12, 2011	Chitose and her twin sister, Chizuru have various yuri fantasies whenever they take their glasses off, with Chitose almost always pairing Kyōko together with Ayano, which often leads to near-fatal nosebleeds while Chizuru pairs Ayano with Chitose and drools instead of having nosebleeds. Whenever Chitose gets drunk (or eats chocolate in the anime), she goes on a kissing rampage.	Japan
Chizuru Ikeda	YuruYuri	July 12, 2011	Chitose and her twin sister, Chizuru have various yuri fantasies whenever they take their glasses off, with Chitose almost always pairing Kyōko together with Ayano, which often leads to near-fatal nosebleeds while Chizuru pairs Ayano with Chitose and drools instead of having nosebleeds. Whenever Chitose gets drunk (or eats chocolate in the anime), she goes on a kissing rampage.	Japan
Dr. Indria	BoJack Horseman	September 14, 2018	Mary-Beth and Dr Indria are a married lesbian couple, as shown in the episode "INT. SUB." Mary-Beth is a professional businesswoman while Dr Indria is a therapist. They both first appear in the fifth season.	United States
Chikage Izumi	Aesthetica of a Rogue Hero	July 13, 2012	She is a friendly, tomboyish girl with short brown hair and amber eyes. She becomes friends with Miu immediately. She is also a lesbian, and shamelessly admits it, though she develops a slight "liking" for Akatsuki, shown in episodes like "Holy Water Bond."	Japan
Sumika Izumino	Yurikuma Arashi	January 5, 2015	Girlfriend of Kureha Tsubaki who is killed by bears.	Japan
Xochi Jalapeño	Victor and Valentino	March 30, 2019	Xochi is Don Jalapeño's rebellious teenage daughter who sometimes babysits the protagonists, likes to go to concerts and attend salsa classes. In "Band for Life", it is revealed that she has a crush on her friend Amabel, as she blushes when Amabel flirts with her. In "Escaramuza", after Amabel gets injured, Val convinces Xochi to fill in for her as a way to impress her, and they plan to go on a date in "Carmelita" before it is interrupted by Victor and Valentino's antics.	United States
Kelsey Jannings	Bojack Horseman	August 22, 2014	While she is calling BoJack to tell him that they are replacing Andrew Garfield with him, Kelsey says "I get enough of that from my ex-wife along with newspaper clippings about gluten" in the episode "Later".	United States
Janai	The Dragon Prince	November 22, 2019	A sunfire Elf warrior who later becomes the queen. She is in love with a deaf woman named Amaya. This relationship was confirmed by the lead writer of The Dragon Prince, Devon Giehl and described as a "complex lesbian relationship" which goes beyond fan service. In the sixth season, Jinai and Amaya have a wedding.	United States
Tsubame Kamoi	Our Maid is Way Too Annoying!	October 5, 2018	Tsubame Kamoi has displayed romantic attraction to young girls, hence why she decided to take a maid job in the household of the protagonist Misha. On numerous occasions, she has opened up about her past problems in dating girls because of her early menstruation development. She also has the desire to marry Misha when she is able to gain her approval.	Japan
Tomoka Kase	Kase-san and Morning Glories	June 9, 2018	She is deeply in love with Yui Yamada.	Japan
Urara Kasugano	Sabagebu!	July 6, 2014	Initially doting on Miou, she falls in love with Momoka instead after developing a masochistic taste for her violent punishments.	Japan
Kat	Craig of the Creek	November 5, 2018	Kat is the girlfriend of Laura Mercer and only appears in one episode, "Jextra Perrestrial."	United States
Katsuragi	Senran Kagura	January 6, 2013	Katsuragi is a member of the "good ninjas" and shows a significant degree of sexual attraction towards several other female characters throughout the series. Notably, she is obsessed with breasts, and enjoys frequently groping her teammates.	Japan
Kiiko Kawakami	Kuttsukiboshi	August 16, 2010	Kiiko is in love with Aaya, but did not have the courage to tell her in the beginning of the summer vacation, while Aaya likes to perform experiments with Kiiko's powers, although, actually, she is in love with her. She usually takes the lead when it comes to activities and has an outgoing personality.	Japan
Hibiki Kenjo	Valkyrie Drive: Mermaid	October 10, 2015	Traumatized by her experience at Mermaid that she refuses to leave her room, and decides to join the fight at the very end with the purpose of not letting anyone else suffer the same way she did, apologizing to Kasumi for leaving her fight alone the whole time.	Japan
Akira Kenjou (Cure Chocolat)	Kirakira☆Pretty Cure à la Mode	March 5, 2017	In the 25th episode's battle, Chocolat's confession of her love for Cure Macaron helped their relationship reach an apex.	Japan
Nat Kinkle	Bob's Burgers	January 14, 2018	Nat is a limousine driver who drives Linda, Tina and Louise around in her limousine in "V for Valentine-detta". In "Just the Trip", she invited the Belchers on a road trip to drop off Steve, her pet snake at her ex-girlfriend's animal sanctuary.	United States
Miyako Kodama	Bloom Into You	October 5, 2018	Riko Hakozaki is her girlfriend as confirmed in Episode 7.	Japan
Yuu Koito	Bloom Into You	October 5, 2018	A girl who loves shoujo manga and hopes to encounter a confession but when she finally does, feels nothing and does not respond. She soon becomes friends with Touko who also has received confessions but felt nothing from them, but later confesses to her.	Japan
Koyume Koizuka	Comic Girls	April 5, 2018	She has a crush on Tsubasa Katsuki, liking both her "masculine" and "feminine" sides. Koyume never knew the feeling of love before meeting Tsubasa and was unable to draw male characters until she started basing them on her. In episode 5, Ruki Irokawa finds out about Koyume's crush and convinces her to go on a date with Tsubasa and Koyumi plans to confess to her, but does not do so. In later episodes of the series, she expresses her attractions, sometimes in perverted ways.	Japan
Aya Komichi	Kin-iro Mosaic	July 13, 2013	She is rather bashful towards Yoko, often not being honest with her feelings. She frequently misinterprets situations between herself and Yoko, responding indignantly and blushing, mostly because of not being able to admit her love to Yoko.	Japan
Yukari Kotozume (Cure Macaron)	Kirakira☆Pretty Cure à la Mode	March 5, 2017	In the 25th episode, Cure Chocolat confesses her love for Cure Macaron, cementing their relationship.	Japan
Mio Kusakai	Keijo	October 27, 2016	She is known to be a lesbian who flirts with other girls, often engaging in molestation.	Japan
Kya	The Legend of Korra	September 13, 2013	Kya is Aang and Katara's daughter who appears in The Legend of Korra. Her sexuality is not mentioned in the animated series, but in the sequel graphic novel The Legend of Korra: Turf Wars, she is confirmed to be a lesbian and gives advice to Korra and Asami about coming out.	United States
Auntie Lofty	My Little Pony: Friendship Is Magic	June 15, 2019	One of the aunts, with Aunt Holiday, to the young pegasus Scootaloo and are her guardians while Scootaloo's parents are away, and confirmed as a lesbian couple by one of the show runners, Michael Vogel.	United States
Lynn Lambretta	Bodacious Space Pirates	February 5, 2012	President of the Space Yacht club, the heir of a major space shipping conglomerate, who later runs away from an arranged marriage with the help of Marika's crew and Lynn, who is revealed to be her lover. She appears with Jenny in the film, Bodacious Space Pirates: Abyss of Hyperspace.	Japan
Shannon Longhannon	3Below: Tales of Arcadia	July 12, 2019	In the episode "Asteroid Rage", just as a meteor is about to hit Earth, Shannon confesses to a girl that she has never been kissed. The girl confesses the same thing back and both of them start to kiss each other.	United States
Naito Margot	Horizon in the Middle of Nowhere	October 15, 2011	Naito and Malga are lovers which makes the two lesbian witches in open rebellion against the Catholic Church, indicated in episodes like "Commandos in Town."	Japan
Mary-Beth	BoJack Horseman	September 14, 2018	Married to Dr. Indria as shown in the episode "INT. SUB." She is a professional businesswoman.	United States
Koko Matsumoto	Wataten!: An Angel Flew Down to Me	February 12, 2019	Koko is a girl who was in a club with Miyako during high school. When introduced in Episode 6, she is shown to have an obsessive crush on Miyako to the point of stalking her everywhere she goes and in everything she does.	Japan
Laura Mercer	Craig of the Creek	April 6, 2018	J.P.'s older sister who is a nurse that appears to help care for the family is openly a lesbian. She has also been shown to be a body-positive person, referring to J.P.'s body as "beautiful" on more than one occasion. In "Jextra Perrestrial" she is shown to be in a same-sex relationship with a girl named Kat.	United States
Shizuku Minami	Sakura Trick	January 16, 2014	Shizuku has a romantic partner named Kotone Noda who she lives with.	Japan
Akechi Mitsuhide	Battle Girls: Time Paradox	April 5, 2011	Nobunaga's humble aide, who is often bemused at her acceptance of Hideyoshi's odd behavior and is secretly infatuated with Nobunaga. To this end, she is prepared to do whatever it takes to "make Nobunaga happy", which is why she is willing to acquire the Crimson Armor set on her feudal lord's behalf. Sub-consequently, she is also jealous, at times, with Hide's interactions with Nobunaga.	Japan
Matsuri Mizusawa	Citrus	February 17, 2018	She is Yuzu's childhood friend who lived close to her before she moved to the Aihara residence, and a second-year in middle school. Upon visiting Yuzu, she reveals that she has feelings for her and tries swaying her away from Mei, who she considers her rival. Like Mei, she tends to be manipulative.	Japan
Zarya Moonwolf	Mysticons	August 28, 2017	The show's creator, Sean Jara, confirmed that Zarya Moonwolf, a Mysticon and street kid, was in a romantic relationship with Kitty Boon were a couple, noting that only one version of the episode was created and that the show's creative team fought for a kiss, but lost even though they managed "to keep the integrity of the love story." Insider noted that queer writers were responsible for "building out an arc" between Zarya and Kitty (which fans dubbed "MoonBoon"), that one creative partner objected to the kiss, resulting in the show's creative time taking it out of the story. Jara told the publication that he fought for the romance to be retained, while the show's studio, Nelvana, confirmed the story, saying the decision was made during production of the show's second season. In a later interview, Jara said that they treated the Kitty and Zarya relationship "like all the other relationships in the show." He added that while he was nervous and aware of possible roadblocks, Matt Ferguson, the show's director, supported it.	Canada
Zarya Moonwolf	Mysticons	August 28, 2017		United States
Moe Morita	Samurai Flamenco	October 31, 2013	Mari Maya, is a central member of the idol group, "Mineral Miracle Muse," writes and composes lyrics, while having a fetish for men in uniforms, and enjoys stepping on the testicles of "molesters and other evildoers." She also has an inferiority complex towards Moe, another member of the idol group, but the two later reconcile by kissing each other in the episode "The Wandering Hero."	Japan
Kirie Motoba	Himouto! Umaru-chan	July 23, 2015	Kirie is a classmate who is introduced as a petite girl with frightening eyes that scare others and that watches Umaru intensely. She is portrayed as shy along with being in love with Umaru. She considers Ebina a rival for Umaru's affections.	Japan
Ran Musen	R-15	August 7, 2011	Ran, a talented programmer, who loves "girl-on girl erotica" and has a fan club of "younger sisters," is also shown to be only interested in girls and hates Taketo. This changes after Taketo helps rescue Fukune from Beni Botan in the episode "Only Girls." She then befriends Taketo soon after.	Japan
Sanae Nagatsuki	Squid Girl	October 11, 2010	She is Eiko's classmate and neighborhood friend who develops an obsessive crush on Squid Girl, otherwise known as Ika. She keeps a vast collection of Squid Girl photographs and memorabilia, and often stalks her. Although Squid Girl often retaliates violently to her advances, she enjoys it.	Japan
Rin Namiki	Kandagawa Jet Girls	October 8, 2019	Rin lives with a girl named Misa Aoi in Tokyo, where they go to college. In later episodes, they become emotionally closer to such an extent that other characters say they are flirting with each other.	Japan
Touko Nanami	Bloom Into You	October 5, 2018	At first, Touko doesn't reciprocate Yuu Koito's feelings for her, but she later confesses to her, reciprocating her feelings. and she is shown reciprocating.	Japan
Naoko-san	Yuri Seijin Naoko-san	December 18, 2010	Naoko-san is an alien who comes from the Planet Yuri and takes the place of Misuzu's sister. She appears to solely have a romantic/sexual attraction to little girls. She also seeks to conquer the world by 'yurifying' it. In the manga, her depiction as a "yurian" is in reality a metaphor for "lesbian".	Japan
Malga Naruze	Horizon in the Middle of Nowhere	October 15, 2011	A lesbian witch in love with Naito Margot, in open rebellion against the Catholic Church.	Japan
Neha	The Dragon Prince	February 15, 2019	She is one of the mothers, along with Annika, of Queen Aanya, who rules the Kingdom of Duran, dying nine years prior to the beginning of the series.	United States
Netossa	She-Ra and the Princesses of Power	November 13, 2018	In a romantic relationship with Spinnerella and a member of the Princess Alliance, like Netossa, by the beginning of the series, a group composed of magical girls that oppose Hordak. The show's creator, ND Stevenson confirmed that in "Mer-Mysteries" Netossa and Spinnerella were on a date and were already married. In the show's final season, Netossa and Spinnerella kiss in the episode "Save the Cat" and Netossa confirms that she and Spinnerella are married in the episode "An Ill Wind".	United States
Kotone Noda	Sakura Trick	January 16, 2014	Kotone is in a romantic relationship with Shizuku Minami, as shown in episodes like "Yet Another Cherry Blossom Color" and both live together.	Japan
Agent Ohio "Vera"	Red vs. Blue	October 2, 2016	Agent Ohio is a lesbian woman and an agent of Project Freelancer who appeared in two episodes of Season 14, specifically "The Triplets" and "The Mission". Her sexuality was confirmed by the episode's writer, Shannon McCormick.	United States
Nadeshiko Ohmuro	YuruYuri	August 13, 2012	Sakurako's older sister who is eighteen years old. She is in a romantic relationship with one of her friends, though it has not yet been revealed who.	Japan
Papika	Flip Flappers	October 6, 2016	Papika realizes her love for Cocona, and their love for each other, during a fight with Cocona's mother in the episode "Pure Howling."	Japan
Pearl	Steven Universe	November 4, 2013	In one episode "We Need to Talk", it is very apparent that Pearl, a female-presenting non-binary gem, is attracted to another gem named Rose Quartz, her now-deceased leader. Her feelings are later confirmed romantic in nature and reciprocated by Rose. In the other episode "Last One Out of Beach City", Pearl is attracted to a female pink-haired human, which resembles Rose. In "Bismuth Casual", Pearl allows Bismuth to flirt with her and has various female humans she is friendly with at the roller rink, where she has been in the past, implying she collects their numbers.	United States
Lieutenant Penumbra	DuckTales	March 9, 2019	In the Season 3 episode "They Put a Moonlander on the Earth!", Penumbra goes out for coffee with Launchpad McQuack but tells him that she is not interested in him because she "just does not wish to date an Earth... male". This reveals that she is a lesbian alien, according to Samantha King, a writer for the episode. King wished it had been more overt and said that people should continue to ask for better representation.	United States
Perfuma	She-Ra and the Princesses of Power	November 13, 2018	A magical princess. Series creator ND Stevenson confirmed that she is in a romantic relationship with Scorpia, which was developed over the course of the entire series.	United States
Kelsey Pokoly	Craig of the Creek	March 30, 2018	Kelsey is one of Craig's best friends. Throughout the series, it was hinted she was into girls. She was confirmed to be a lesbian in June 2021 by Insider. The season four episode "Fire and Ice" focuses on her relationship with Stacks. She confesses her love to Stacks.	United States
EJ Randell	Clarence	December 4, 2014	EJ and Sue, who were introduced in the episode "Jeff Wins", are Jeff Randell's mothers. They are voiced by queer actresses Lea DeLaria and Tig Notaro respectively.	United States
Sue Randell	Clarence	December 4, 2014	EJ and Sue, who were introduced in the episode "Jeff Wins", are Jeff Randell's mothers. They are voiced by queer actresses Lea DeLaria and Tig Notaro respectively.	
Red Action	OK K.O.! Let's Be Heroes	August 1, 2017	She is in a relationship with Enid, with their first date in the episode "Back in Red Action", becoming a more committed couple as the show progressed. In a Reddit Q&A with Ian Jones-Quartey, a fan asked about a rumor that Kali Hawk's character, Red Action, was gay, and asked the same for Enid being bisexual. Ian replied, "True and True". Yellow may also be her ex-girlfriend.	United States
Reina	Danger & Eggs	June 30, 2017	She is a femme "brown-skinned energetic creative" who likes to build with her hands and is empowered by the world around her, as described by her queer voice actress, Jasika Nicole. She is also the best friend of one of the protagonists, DD, who she is very loving with.	United States
Retoree	Show by Rock!!	April 5, 2015	A Golden Retriever dog girl who has long blonde ears and a ribbon in her hair. She is the smart girl in the group and uses her smartphone anytime, making her shy and unsociable, even as she appears to have a crush on Cyan, the protagonist.	Japan
Ruby and Sapphire	Steven Universe	November 4, 2013	Two genderless but feminine-presenting members of the Crystal Gems who have a romantic relationship with each other, and stay permanently fused to form Garnet. Also the co-executive producer, Ian Jones-Quartey, has confirmed that, according to human standards and terminology, calling Ruby a non-binary, feminine-presenting lesbian would be "a fair assessment". On July 6, 2018, the episode "Reunited" aired, in which Ruby and Sapphire get married, kiss, and fuse back into Garnet, after Ruby proposed to Sapphire in a previous episode, "The Question". They are voiced by queer actor Charlyne Yi and lesbian actress Erica Luttrell respectively.	United States
Ruru	Kiznaiver	May 15, 2016	Ruru fell in love with Honoka and sought a romantic relationship with her, as noted in the show's sixth and seventh episodes, but later died, something which Honoka regrets.	Japan
Sayaka Saeki	Bloom Into You	October 5, 2018	Sayaka is Nanami's best friend from first grade and she had a crush on her. In one episode, Sayaka recalls how she dated a girl in middle school, only to find that she was not taking it seriously, after which she fell for Touko. In the following episode, she has a brief run-in with her ex-girlfriend, managing to say her piece to her.	Japan
Momoka Sagara	Valkyrie Drive: Mermaid	November 28, 2015	The series' second antagonist. She harbored a deep hatred of Mirei for "abandoning" her, as shown in the episode "Takeover," which turned her into a homicidal maniac, and has volunteered herself for further enhancement; they enable her to transform her chosen Extar into any weapon of her choice and absorb A Virus carriers to enhance her Arm's power. It was revealed at the end of the series that she and Mirei were in a past relationship whilst they were Soldiers. In one of the OVA shorts, their relationship was confirmed to be sexual.	Japan
Kureha Sakamachi	Mayo Chiki!	July 7, 2011	Kureha, Jiro's younger sister, has a crush on Suburu, which makes her jealous of Jiro's relation with Suburu. Usami gets hit on by Kureha in episode 6, "Let the War Begin," embarrassing Jiro, with Usami agreeing with Jiro's explanation that her and Kureha are "pretty good friends. She is "paid" by Nakuru in the episode "Please Massage Them!," when helping her with her new graphic novel by giving her photographs of Subaru, which she goes wild over.	Japan
Charlotte Scharsen	Valkyrie Drive: Mermaid	October 10, 2015	The series first antagonist. She has a harem of Extars (other girls) – called the Adel ("nobility") – that she uses all at once when fighting her opponents. She strives to bring Mermaid under her thumb, but is later seduced as a willing puppet Governor by Momoka.	Japan
Hildagard Schlievogt	Cross Ange	November 1, 2014	Hildagard, known as Hilda for short, was lovers with Zola, and later begins to engage in sexual relations with Chris and Rosalie, while she is attracted to Angelise "Ange."	Japan
Scorpia	She-Ra and the Princesses of Power	November 13, 2018	According to series creator ND Stevenson, the relationship between Scorpia and Perfuma is subtle, and was developed "through the course of the show." A few days after Season 3 was released, Scorpia voice's actress Lauren Ash and Catra voice actress AJ Michalka speculated that Scorpia and Catra would spend time together, with Ash even reportedly creating a comic series titled "Scorpia and Catra's Adventures". Additionally, in the episode "Princess Scorpia", Scorpia's two moms are shown in a picture near her bed, holding an infant Scorpia.	United States
Akemi Seumizome	Inari, Konkon, Koi Iroha	January 15, 2014	Akemi is a popular girl who constantly gets confessions from boys, but she later finds herself falling in love with tomboy Keiko Sanjō. Though Keiko rejects her, the two remain friends and Inari "yearns for her," with Akemi later confessing to Inari that she loves her.	Japan
Sam Sharp	The Loud House	May 2, 2016	In the episode "L is for Love", Luna Loud sent her a love letter and Sam seemed to reciprocate those feelings. Later on, Sam also appears to reciprocate Luna's feelings, with some describing them as beginning to date in the episode "Racing Hearts". (Note: This GLAAD report says "Nickelodeon's The Loud House still features bisexual character Luna Loud, and showed her starting to date Sam, a girl from school, earlier this year.")	United States
Sherry	Red vs. Blue	October 9, 2016	Sherry is a lesbian woman and a soldier for Charon Industries who appeared in one episode of Season 14, "The Mission". Her sexuality was confirmed by the episode's writer, Shannon McCormick in the same string of tweets where he said Vera was lesbian.	United States
Kasumi Shigure	Valkyrie Drive: Mermaid	October 10, 2015	Kasumi is the commander of Wärter who is opposed to Charlotte's despotic regime over Mermaid's residents. She is in a relationship with Hibiki.	Japan
Mirei Shikishima	Valkyrie Drive: Mermaid	October 31, 2015	Mirei states that she would have had no reason to live if she had not met Mamori. In one of the OVA shorts, it was revealed that Mirei used to be in a relationship with Momoka, the second antagonist.	Japan
Haruka Shiraishi	Chu-Bra!!	January 4, 2010	Haruka appears to have romantic feelings for Nayu, leading some to suspect her of being a lesbian, most especially because of her huge disliking to most males who mock/objectify her bust size.	Japan
Ume Shiraume	Ben-To	October 23, 2011	She is obsessed with Hana and usually beats Yō up out of jealousy, despite also being prone to flirt with other girls like Ayame.	Japan
Skout	Nomad of Nowhere	March 16, 2018	Skout, the series' lesbian protagonist, cares about Captain Toth, her superior, throughout the series. She has a crush on her, which has been officially confirmed. Trying to inspire confidence in her superior, she is often the voice of reason for Toth, who is a rule-oriented and may like Skout too, despite the fact she is occasionally dismissive, causing fissures in their relationship.	United States
Mitsuki Sonoda	Sakura Trick	January 23, 2014	Mitsuki is Yū's older sister. She is suspicious of the relationship between Haruka and Yū and disapproves of it. However, she develops a crush on Haruka.	Japan
Yū Sonoda	Sakura Trick	January 9, 2014	She is in a romantic relationship with her friend, Haruka Takayama.	Japan
Spinnerella	She-Ra and the Princesses of Power	November 13, 2018	In a romantic relationship with Netossa, member of the Princess Alliance, and was confirmed by series creator ND Stevenson, as married to Netossa. In the show's final season, Spinerella kisses Netossa in the episode "Save the Cat" while their marriage is confirmed by Netossa in the episode "An Ill Wind".	United States
Ayano Sugiura	YuruYuri	July 12, 2011	Ayano is in love with Kyouko but is often not too honest with her feelings for her, always referring to her by her full name and treating her with acts of hostility, despite not wanting do so on purpose.	Japan
Naoko Sukeban	Cutie Honey Universe	April 8, 2018	Despite her rough looks and personality, she has a crush on Cutie Honey and is, as a result, quite jealous of Natsuko "Nat-chan" Aki, Honey's friend. During Panther Claw's assault on Saint Chapel, in revenge for the death of her entire gang and in order to protect Honey, she intercepts a deadly attack by Snake Panther and covers Honey and Natsuko's escape, apparently at the cost of her own life. However, thanks to her toughness she returns to take part in the final fight to Sister Jill, and later joins Honey at their rebuilt school.	Japan
Tabitha	Craig of the Creek	April 16, 2018	In their debut episode "The Curse", Tabitha refuses to go college and wants to spend a few times with Courtney, making Courtney blush and they're holding hands in the end. In the episode "The Haunted Dollhouse", their feelings for each other are confirmed and they kiss in the end.	United States
Haruka Takayama	Sakura Trick	January 9, 2014	Haruka, friends with Yū Sonoda since middle school, is in a romantic relationship with her.	Japan
Thea	Doc McStuffins	August 5, 2017	The title character, Dottie "Doc" McStuffins, routinely interacts with toys, dolls, and stuffed animals that have come to life. In episode "The Emergency Plan", Thea and Edie, two dolls, form a lesbian married couple and are parents of two doll children. This was the first same-sex couple featured in a Disney Junior preschool series. Thea is voiced by lesbian actresses Wanda Sykes.	United States
Toast	Bee and PuppyCat	July 11, 2013	She is a wrestler who formerly wrestled with Cass and holds a grudge against her. In her debut episode "Toast", she mentions her unnamed ex-wife.	United States
Tohru	Miss Kobayashi's Dragon Maid	January 11, 2017	Tohru falls in love with Kobayashi after she saved her and starts living in her flat as a maid. Tohru and Kobayashi's relationship is described as a 'mundane family type' one whilst taking care of the young dragon Kanna. Moreover, it is confirmed that Kobayashi has begun to return Tohru's feelings of a more romantic nature in chapter 48 of the manga continuation, even though the show itself heavily implied that Kobayashi also has feelings for her, with Tohru's maid act "specifically appealing to Kobayashi's turn-ons."	Japan
Mamori Tokonome	Valkyrie Drive: Mermaid	October 10, 2015	She is in a romantic and sexual relationship with Mirei Shikishima.	Japan
Tomboy	The Awesomes	August 8, 2013	Originally presented as Gadget Gal's nemesis, she is outed in the episode "Baby Got Backstory" as using the feud to cope with her own romantic feelings for her.	United States
Tomo	Crossing Time	April 9, 2018	In Episode 1, Tomo confessed her love for her best friend, Ai after having brief discussions about love interests. Ai is left confused but Tomo ensures her that she should take her time when responding to her confession. In Episode 12, Ai is still unsure on how she should respond, often viewing the atmosphere and place as "ruining the mood". Tomo then starts to have doubts and regrets about her confession to Ai and hence, tries to inform Ai otherwise. However, Ai refrains her from doing so and states that she should give her some time to think and that no matter who confesses to her, she would still feel the same way. As the train passes by, Tomo expresses her love for her once again much to Ai's embarrassment.	Japan
Kureha Tsubaki	Yurikuma Arashi	January 5, 2015	Kureha's girlfriend, Sumika, was killed by two bears, as was her mother Reia.	Japan
Mahiru Tsuyuzaki	Revue Starlight	August 9, 2018	The anime follows the developments between an all-female cast of main characters, and it is heavily implied that Mahiru has a crush on her roommate, Karen. In episode 5, Mahiru's feelings of jealousy culminate during her clash with Karen. While they fight, Mahiru asks Karen through song if she remembers throwing "Love's Wicked Pitch" at her. At the end of the episode, Mahiru asserts to herself that she loves her.	Japan
Sophie Twilight	Ms. Vampire Who Lives in My Neighborhood.	October 5, 2018	Sophie does not like her peaceful life being disrupted by Akari's affection and is not sure how to deal with a spastic Akari.	Japan
Midori Ukai	Our Maid is Way Too Annoying!	November 5, 2018	In Episode 6, Misha encounters Midori Ukai, a former JASDF lieutenant who fell in love with Tsubame and developed a masochistic obsession with her. Although Tsubame does not return her feelings, in Episode 8 Misha states that if they were to get married, with Midori's riches and Tsubame's maid expertises, they would make a perfect couple.	Japan
Vaggie	Hazbin Hotel	October 28, 2019	Vaggie is in a relationship with Princess Charlotte "Charlie" Morningstar, with whom she works as a hotel manager of the titular Hazbin Hotel. She and Charlie seek to open their hotel to redeem all sinners of Hell. She is shown wearing the colors of the orange-pink lesbian flag in official Pride Month art.	United States
Yui Yamada	Kase-san and Morning Glories	June 9, 2018	Yui, a clumsy, flower-adoring girl, falls in love with Kase, the school's track and field star.	Japan
Ymir	Attack on Titan	May 12, 2013	The official website mentions Ymir is in love with Historia (Krista). According to a panel in 2014, Historia reciprocated Ymir's feelings. It was confirmed that they were a couple, by the English voice actress for Ymir, Elizabeth Maxwell.	Japan
Chinatsu Yoshikawa	YuruYuri	July 5, 2011	Although the work is rather ambiguous about the orientation of main girls, Chinatsu is the one who has a confirmed crush on another girl.	Japan
Nobara Yukinokōji	Inu x Boku SS	January 19, 2012	She holds a primary sexual interest in young cute girls as shown in the episode "The Real Contract," with some calling her a "predatory lesbian."	Japan
Yuna's moms	Middle School Moguls	September 15, 2019	In the episode "Mo'gul Money, Mo Problems", Yuna, a fashion designer, is shown to have two mothers, one who is Black and other who is White, that give their daughter an inspirational speech over the phone as she tries to make a dress. They show up again, this time in person, in the final episode, "Mogul on a Mission".	United States
Lulu Yurigasaki	Yurikuma Arashi	January 5, 2015	Lulu pines after certain people and tells Kureha Tsubaki, as does Ginko, the truth of why her mother and Sumika died.	Japan
Ginko Yurishiro	Yurikuma Arashi	January 5, 2015	Kureha Tsubaki later accepts bears even more and becomes one herself, embarking on a romantic relationship with Ginko.	Japan

== In the 2020s ==
Characters	Title	Character debut date	Notes	Country
Sakura Adachi	Adachi and Shimamura	October 9, 2020	Adachi wishes she was closer with her friend, Shimamura, even dreaming of kissing her.	Japan
Alice	The Loud House	February 12, 2020	Dating a member of the roller derby, named Lainey.	United States
Amy	Big Nate	December 26, 2022	Amy is Dee Dee's girlfriend. She becomes a recurring character in season 2.	United States
Donna Blake	Velma	January 12, 2023	Donna and Linda Blake are Daphne Blake's adoptive mothers. They both work as detectives. Donna is voiced by lesbian actress Jane Lynch and Linda is voiced by lesbian comedian Wanda Sykes.	United States
Linda Blake	Velma	January 12, 2023	Donna and Linda Blake are Daphne Blake's adoptive mothers. They both work as detectives. Donna is voiced by lesbian actress Jane Lynch and Linda is voiced by lesbian comedian Wanda Sykes.	United States
Amity Blight	The Owl House	January 24, 2020	Initially serving as a rival to protagonist Luz Noceda, she warms up to her due to the latter's kind nature. Amity is a top student at Hexside Academy, the same school Luz is attending, and is shown blushing or becoming bashful on multiple occasions whenever Luz displays any affectionate behavior towards her, suggesting that she might have a crush on Luz. Her implied sapphism is confirmed in the episode "Enchanting Grom Fright", where it is revealed that her biggest fear is getting rejected by someone who she planned to ask to prom, and that person is revealed to be Luz. Animation supervisor Spencer Wan described Luz and Amity's dance in the same episode as "the gay thing" while series creator Dana Terrace noted that "queer kids" were in the main cast and that there was a bisexual character in the show, without specifying which character she was referring to in her tweet. Additionally, Gravity Falls creator and The Owl House voice actor Alex Hirsch stated that the show contained "explicitly queer" characters. On September 2, during a Reddit AMA, Terrace confirmed that Amity is intended to be a lesbian. In the same AMA, Terrace stated that Luz was Amity's first crush. Amity is voiced by pansexual actress Mae Whitman.	United States
Grease Trap Connie	Praise Petey	August 11, 2023	Grease Trap Connie is a plumber. She becomes Eliza's girlfriend in the episode "The Tangible Secret". Connie reappears in the final two episodes of the series. Grease Trap Connie is voiced by queer comedian Paris Sashay.	United States
Siobhan Cruz	DC Super Hero Girls	September 20, 2020	One of the super hero girls, Jessica Cruz, also known as Green Lantern, has two moms, Siobhan and Angela, both of whom premiered in the episode #HousePest. When asked about this by Taimur Gur of ComicsBeat, series creator Lauren Faust said that everyone was "on board with this idea" and that she was glad it was approved.	United States
Angela Cruz	DC Super Hero Girls	September 20, 2020	One of the super hero girls, Jessica Cruz, also known as Green Lantern, has two moms, Siobhan and Angela, both of whom premiered in the episode #HousePest. When asked about this by Taimur Gur of ComicsBeat, series creator Lauren Faust said that everyone was "on board with this idea" and that she was glad it was approved.	United States
Betty DeVille	Rugrats	May 27, 2021	Betty is the mother of Phil and Lil DeVille. In the original series, she was married to Howard DeVille. But in the reboot, Betty is a gay single mother. Betty is voiced by openly queer actress Natalie Morales, describing the character as a "single mom with her own business who has twins" but still hangs out with her community and friends, even casually talking about her ex-girlfriend.	United States
Becker Denoga	Hailey's On It!	June 8, 2023	Becker is Scott Denoga's younger sister. In the episode "Catching Felines", Becker is revealed to be a lesbian as she's shown having a crush on Hailey and wanting to kiss her. In the episode "Along for the Slide", Becker gets into a relationship with her former rival Kennedy.	United States
Danielle	Human Resources	March 18, 2022	In a romantic relationship with Nadia el-Koury. She is voiced by queer actress Ariana DeBose.	United States
Donny's Mothers	T.O.T.S.	March 20, 2020	A lesbian couple of dolpins which adopts a baby dolphin named Donny, in episode "Seas the Day".	United States
Duffy	Work It Out Wombats!	February 6, 2023	A kangaroo mom of tarsier Louisa.	United States
Eliza	Praise Petey	July 21, 2023	Eliza is one of Petey's new friends and one of the few sane people in New Utopia. In the seventh episode "The Tangible Secret", Eliza is revealed to be a lesbian as she has a crush on a female plumber named Grease Trap Connie. Connie reciprocates her feelings. This was hinted in the first episode when Eliza states she used to be one of the multiple wives of Petey's father and felt uncomfortable being married to a man. Eliza is voiced by queer actress Kiersey Clemons. The series creator, Anna Drezen, noted that she liked to "see people in beautiful locations flirting" and that it is "fun to have characters be nervous around each other and try to prove a point, while they also have feelings for each other" like Connie and Eliza, and noting romcom elements in the series.	United States
Lena Foreman	Big Mouth	December 4, 2020	The September 11 attacks special "A Very Special 9/11 Episode" shows Lena being in a relationship with her white girlfriend Nadia as she starts acting all nice and sweet with her when she shows up. She is voiced by lesbian actress Lena Waithe.	United States
Gina	#1 Happy Family USA	April 17, 2025	In a romantic relationship with Mona Hussein. Voiced by Megan Stalter, a bisexual actress..	United States
Hazel Gonzalez	DreamWorks Dragons: The Nine Realms	December 23, 2021	Hazel and Carla Gonzalez are the mothers of Alexandra Gonzalez.	United States
Carla Gonzalez	DreamWorks Dragons: The Nine Realms	December 23, 2021	Hazel and Carla Gonzalez are the mothers of Alexandra Gonzalez.	United States
Lyra Gorgon	Monster High	October 2, 2023	Lyra is Deuce Gorgon's other mother and Medusa's wife. She makes her debut in the season 2 episode "Spell the Beans". Lyra is voiced by non–binary actor Jessie Hendricks.	United States
Medusa Gorgon	Monster High	November 29, 2022	Medusa is Deuce Gorgon's mother. The original toyline and 2016 reboot mention Deuce having Medusa as a mother but a father was never mentioned. In the series, Medusa is married to another woman Lyra who is a siren.	United States
Agent Harrington	Common Side Effects	February 2, 2025	Agent Harrington is a DEA agent. In the second episode, Agent Harrington is revealed to be a lesbian as she falls in love with mycologist Amelia "Mushroom".	United States
Janet Hazard	Bearbrick	March 21, 2025	Janet is a Bearbrick who want to rekindle her dancing dream. She is one of Nick Hazard's mothers.	United States
Denise Hazard	Bearbrick	March 21, 2025	Denise is Janet's wife and one of Nick Hazard's mothers.	United States
Akira Hino	Adachi and Shimamura	October 9, 2020	While she calls Taeko Nagafuji her "good friend," they clearly have feelings for each other, and their relationship develops over the course of the anime.	Japan
Hira	Dragon Age: Absolution	December 9, 2022	Hira is a human mage and Miriam's former lover.	Canada
Hira	Dragon Age: Absolution	December 9, 2022	Hira is a human mage and Miriam's former lover.	South Korea
Dee Dee Holloway	Big Nate	February 17, 2022	Dee Dee Holloway is one of Nate's friends. In the episode "The Pimple", she was overjoyed that the substitute drama teacher, Donna, is married to another woman, Kathleen, and her fantasy features rainbow imagery. Dee Dee is confirmed to be a lesbian in the episode "Six-Tween Candles", in where she starts dating a girl named Amy.	United States
Mona Hussein	#1 Happy Family USA	April 17, 2025	Teenage daughter of the Muslim Egyptian-American Hussein family. She is initially a closeted lesbian. She is in a relationship with a white girl named Gina. Mona Hussein voiced by bisexual actress Alia Shawkat	United States
Sorawo Kamikoshi	Otherside Picnic	January 4, 2021	A sophomore at a university in Saitama Prefecture who becomes friends with Toriko Nishina and begins to develop feelings for her over the course of the series.	Japan
Kennedy	Hailey's On It!	July 29, 2023	Kennedy is Becker's rival-turned-girlfriend.	United States
Lady Kima	The Legend of Vox Machina	January 28, 2022	Lady Kima is a member of the Tal'Dorei Council. She eventually gets into a relationship with Lady Allura and marries her. Lady Kima is voiced by bisexual actress Stephanie Beatriz.	United States
Nadia el-Koury	Human Resources	March 18, 2022	Nadia is Natalie's older sister who plans on going to college. She is in a relationship with a woman named Danielle. Nadia is voiced by lesbian comedian Sabrina Jalees	United States
Kuro	A Ninja and an Assassin Under One Roof	April 17, 2025	The leader of the escapees from the ninja village, who has memory-erasing powers, and fled to be with her lover, Yuriko, who lives in the civilian world. She introduces Yuriko to Satoko in the third episode as her significant other. She later gives, in the fourth episode, Satoko tips on getting along with her roommate, Konoha, who is cold toward her, and lets Satoko sleep over with her when Konoha kicks her out. The same episode implies that Yuriko is not her first girlfriend, but her previous partners are so forgettable that she doesn't remember their names, and is freeloading with her girlfriend, while engaging in gambling.	Japan
Lainey	The Loud House	February 12, 2020	In the episode "Singled Out", Lainey, one of Lynn's roller derby team, is dating a girl named Alice.	United States
Leiko	Work It Out Wombats!	February 6, 2023	Leiko is an adoptive kangaroo mother of tarsier Louisa with Duffy.	United States
Euphyllia "Euphy" Magenta	The Magical Revolution of the Reincarnated Princess and the Genius Young Lady	January 4, 2023	A high-ranking noble, she is the ex-fiancé of Anisphia's younger brother, Algard, who breaks off their engagement, claiming that Euphy bullied the woman he lived, Lainie Cyan. She is rescued by Anis and becomes her magical assistant. She begins developing romantic feelings toward her. At the end of the series, she completes her magical covenant, to become queen, instead of Anis, who reciprocates her romantic feelings, and joins the royal family.	Japan
Margie	Dead End: Paranormal Park	June 16, 2022	Margie and Marly are an elderly African-American lesbian couple who frequently visit Phoenix Park. They have a young son Vince. Margie is voiced by transgender actress Angelica Ross.	United States
Marly	Dead End: Paranormal Park	June 16, 2022	Margie and Marly are an elderly African-American lesbian couple who frequently visit Phoenix Park. They have a young son Vince. Margie is voiced by transgender actress Angelica Ross.	United States
Meemaw	Superbuns	October 12, 2023	Meemaw and Geemaw are the grandmas of Superbuns and her older sister Blossom. They are an elderly same-sex couple. Diane Kredensor, the author of the book, is a queer woman who is married to another woman.	Canada
Geemaw	Superbuns	October 12, 2023	Meemaw and Geemaw are the grandmas of Superbuns and her older sister Blossom. They are an elderly same-sex couple. Diane Kredensor, the author of the book, is a queer woman who is married to another woman.	Canada
Miriam	Dragon Age: Absolution	December 9, 2023	Miriam is a Tevinter mercenary and runaway slave. She was in a relationship with Hira.	Canada
Miriam	Dragon Age: Absolution	December 9, 2023	Miriam is a Tevinter mercenary and runaway slave. She was in a relationship with Hira.	South Korea
Momo	The Executioner and Her Way of Life	April 2, 2022	A young priestess and Menou's aide. She assists Menou on anything she needs during a mission, including reconnaissance, providing disguises, and providing support in battles. She has had a crush on Menou ever since they were childhood friends, and hence treasures the hair ribbons gifted to her dearly. With Menou insisting that she hide her presence from Akari, Momo begins to grow jealous at how close the two are getting.	Japan
Morana	Castlevania	March 5, 2020	A member of the "Council of Sisters" who is introduced in Season 3. Screenwriter Warren Ellis noted she and Striga have been a couple for a long time.	United States
Oki's Mothers	T.O.T.S.	March 20, 2020	In one episode "Night at the Nursery", a baby otter named Oki is adopted by an otter lesbian couple.	United States
Dr. Mulberry	Clifford the Big Red Dog	January 7, 2020	The episode "The Big Red Tomato/Dogbot" revealed that Samantha Mulberry has two moms. Dr. Mulberry is voiced by Maggie Cassella, a lesbian actress.	United States
Rayla Mulberry	Clifford the Big Red Dog	January 7, 2020	The episode "The Big Red Tomato/Dogbot" revealed that Samantha Mulberry has two moms. Dr. Mulberry is voiced by Maggie Cassella, a lesbian actress.	United States
Taeko Nagafuji	Adachi and Shimamura	October 9, 2020	She has feelings for her friend, Akira Hino, and a developing relationship over the course of the series.	Japan
Toriko Nishina	Otherside Picnic	January 4, 2021	A woman who searches the Otherside for her missing friend Satsuki, who appears to be a college student, and has long blond hair and is, in the opinion of Sorawo, "extremely beautiful". She has a tendency to isolate herself from others, and has no friends other than Sorawo and Satsuki, who was Toriko's tutor.	Japan
Lady Olivia	Amphibia	August 15, 2020	In a romantic relationship with General Yunan as shown in the series finale.	United States
Anisphia "Anis" Wynn Palettia	The Magical Revolution of the Reincarnated Princess and the Genius Young Lady	January 4, 2023	Anis is the princess of the Kingdom of Palettia and an out of closet lesbian. She rescues Euphyllia "Euphy" Magenta from a marriage with her brother, Algard, and makes Euphy her assistant in her magicology experiments. She slowly develops romantic feelings for Euphy. She later reciprocates Euphy's romantic feelings.	Japan
Dr. Polar Bear	Peppa Pig	September 15, 2021	Dr. Polar Bear and Mummy Polar Bear are the mothers of Penny Polar Bear.	United Kingdom
Mummy Polar Bear	Peppa Pig	November 19, 2021	Dr. Polar Bear and Mummy Polar Bear are the mothers of Penny Polar Bear.	United Kingdom
Pothina	Cleopatra in Space	November 19, 2020	A mother of Akila, along with Pothina, and voiced by Cissy Jones. Like Theoda, she deeply loves her daughter, Akila.	United States
Amina Ramsey	Star Trek: Lower Decks	September 17, 2020	A Starfleet officer, she is the captain of the USS Oakland. In early October 2020, the creator of Star Trek: Lower Decks, Mike McMahan, confirmed that Amina Ramsey was Beckett Mariner's former lover at Starfleet Academy, even though it was not explicit, saying that "every Starfleet officer is probably at the baseline bisexual" in a sense, and that they did not "intentionally mean for anybody to be strictly heteronormative or straight or cis." She reappeared in the season 3 finale "The Stars at Night".	United States
Sallie May	Helluva Boss	April 30, 2021	Sallie May is Millie's sister. She is shown wearing the colors of the orange-pink lesbian flag and the transgender flag in official Pride Month art.	United States
Mrs. Mayberry	Helluva Boss	October 31, 2020	Mrs. Mayberry is a client of I.M.P in the show's first episode, "Murder Family", where she hires them to kill her ex-husband's mistress, Martha. In a later episode, "Apology Tour", it is implied that she and Martha have entered a relationship. She is shown wearing the colors of the orange-pink lesbian flag in official Pride Month merchandise.	United States
Jennifer Sh'reyan	Star Trek: Lower Decks	August 20, 2020	An Andorian woman who was previously seen as Beckett Mariner's rival even though Jen was unaware of it. She is an ensign on the U.S.S. Cerritos. In the episode "I, Excretus", Jen makes out with Ensign Barnes in the Naked Time simulator. In the season 2 finale "First First Contact", she started hooking up with Mariner. However Jennifer dumps Mariner in the episode "Trusted Sources".	United States
Striga	Castlevania	March 5, 2020	Striga and Morana are members of the "Council of Sisters" who are introduced in Season 3. Screenwriter Warren Ellis noted they have been a couple for a long time.	United States
Rae Taylor	I'm in Love with the Villainess	October 3, 2023	Rae is the main protagonist, who was reincarnated into an otome game world, and has no interest in the game's male capture targets. She adores Claire François, the game's villainess. In the third episode, she openly states that she is gay and believes that her love will not be reciprocated, as she has been hurt by unreciprocated love in the past.	Japan
Theoda	Cleopatra in Space	November 19, 2020	A mother of Akila along with Pothina, with voice actor Kari Wahlgreen highlighting her voicing of the character along with Cissy Jones as Pothina. Apart from working as scholars at the "Savior Institute,," which studies Cleo and the prophecy she will save the galaxy from the evil clutches of Octavian, Theoda and Pothina use social expressions like "rad", "yas queen" and "baller." Their admiration for Cleo annoys Akila, but after Akila is almost eaten by a snake they say she is the most important thing in their lives.	United States
Akari Tokitō	The Executioner and Her Way of Life	April 2, 2022	One of the main protagonists. She is a high school student who possesses the Pure Concept of Time, making her capable of reversing events. She is initially portrayed as rather clumsy and air-headed, but also kind and trusting, leading her to easily trust Menou upon their first meeting as she believed that their encounter was fate despite the fact that Menou has a mission to kill her. She is deeply in love with Menou.	Japan
Trish	Rugrats	April 14, 2023	Betty's new girlfriend who appears in season 2. Trish is voiced by bisexual actress Alia Shawkat.	United States
Val Vega-Vaughn	Firebuds	September 23, 2022	Val and Viv are the mothers of one of the series' main characters, Violet Vega-Vaughn. Val is voiced by queer actress Natalie Morales.	United States
Viv Vega-Vaughn	Firebuds	September 23, 2022	Val and Viv are the mothers of one of the series' main characters, Violet Vega-Vaughn. Val is voiced by queer actress Natalie Morales.	United States
Velvette	Hazbin Hotel	January 19, 2024 (Note: Velvette made an unvoiced cameo appearance in the Hazbin Hotel pilot episode, which debuted October 28, 2019.)	Velvette is a member of the antagonist trio "The Vees". She is shown wearing the colors of the orange-pink lesbian flag in official Pride Month art.	United States
Sera	Hazbin Hotel	January 26, 2024	Sera is the head seraphim of Heaven. She is shown wearing the colors of the orange-pink lesbian flag in official Pride Month art.	United States
Alison Williams	Koala Man	January 9, 2023	Alison is Koala Man's daughter who is obsessed with being popular. After becoming the most popular girl at her school; she falls in love with another popular girl Rosie Yodels. Unfortunately, it ends in tragedy as Rosie and her doppelgängers die. Allison is voiced by bisexual comedian Demi Lardner.	Australia
Rosie Yodels	Koala Man	January 9, 2023	Alison is Koala Man's daughter who is obsessed with being popular. After becoming the most popular girl at her school; she falls in love with another popular girl Rosie Yodels. Unfortunately, it ends in tragedy as Rosie and her doppelgängers die. Allison is voiced by bisexual comedian Demi Lardner.	Australia
General Yunan	Amphibia	August 1, 2020	In a romantic relationship with Lady Olivia as shown in the series finale.	United States
Yuriko	A Ninja and an Assassin Under One Roof	April 17, 2025	Kuro's lover who is willing to offer moral support to her and her friends, though she repeatedly tries to rein in Kuro's frivolous spending on pachinko and other unnecessary objects. Her voice actress, Rumi Okubo, called her a "proper adult woman" who worries about Kuro.	Japan

== See also ==
- List of feature films with lesbian characters
- List of lesbian characters in television
- List of fictional lesbian characters
- Media portrayal of lesbians
- Lesbian literature
- List of yuri works
- List of animated series with LGBT characters
- List of comedy television series with LGBT characters
- List of dramatic television series with LGBT characters: 1960s–2000s
- List of dramatic television series with LGBT characters: 2010–2015
- List of dramatic television series with LGBT characters: 2016–2019
- Lists of LGBT figures in fiction and myth
- List of fictional gay characters
- List of bisexual characters in animation
- List of fictional bisexual characters
- List of fictional trans characters
- List of fictional asexual characters
- List of fictional intersex characters
- List of fictional non-binary characters
- List of fictional pansexual characters
- List of fictional polyamorous characters
