= San Diego Gay and Lesbian News =

Online LGBT Newspaper

- San Diego Gay and Lesbian News logo
- Type: LGBT online news source
- Owner(s): Hale Media, Inc.
- Founder(s): Johnathan Hale
- Founded: 2009
- Language: English
- Ceased publication: March, 2020
- Headquarters: San Diego, California
- Website: www.sdgln.com

San Diego Gay & Lesbian News (SDGLN) was an online LGBT newspaper in the San Diego, California, area. SDGLN features daily news and commentary online with a weekly wrap-up of stories delivered to e-mail subscribers every week. SDGLN partners with other media outlets who contribute content.

It was founded in 2009 by SDGLN's publisher, Johnathan Hale, and is owned by his company, Hale Media, Inc. Its sister company San Diego Pix (SDPIX), and SDGLN had a data breach in 2020 during the COVID pandemic. SDGLN continued to operate as an online news source, however SDPIX ceased its print publication due to the pandemic and later shut down due to the data breach. Its last issue was published in March 2020.

In April 2020, SDGLN transitioned to a new name and branding- San Diego LGBT News (SDLGBTN). It too ceased publication as a result of the data breach- which resulted in the website being hacked and transferred to an unknown company who continues to publish click-bait news articles

The data breach and publication closures were first reported via Facebook by Johnathan Hale, and later via SDPIX.

Another LGBT newspaper in the San Diego area, the Gay and Lesbian Times, ceased publication in 2010.
