= Gay and Lesbian Times =

Newspaper in San Diego, California

- Final print edition, No. 1188, published on September 30, 2010
- Type: LGBT newspaper
- Owner(s): Gay Times, Inc.
- Founder: Michael Portantino
- Founded: January, 1988
- Ceased publication: September 30, 2010
- Language: English
- Headquarters: San Diego, California
- Circulation: 9,000

The Gay and Lesbian Times was an LGBT newspaper in the San Diego, California, area. It was a member of the National Gay Newspaper Guild. The paper originally launched in January 1988 as the San Diego Gay Times.

The Labrys lesbian flag was first published in June 2000 in the Palm Springs edition of the Gay and Lesbian Times Pride issue.

In May 2010, the Gay and Lesbian Times was accused of defrauding advertisers over circulation counts while being saddled in debt. In September 2010, it folded.

In December 2010, its founder Michael Portantino committed suicide by jumping from the Park Manor Suites, a historic 7-story San Diego hotel, popular with the gay community.

Another major newspaper, the San Diego Gay and Lesbian News, launched in 2009.
