= Lesbian flags =

Symbols for lesbian community

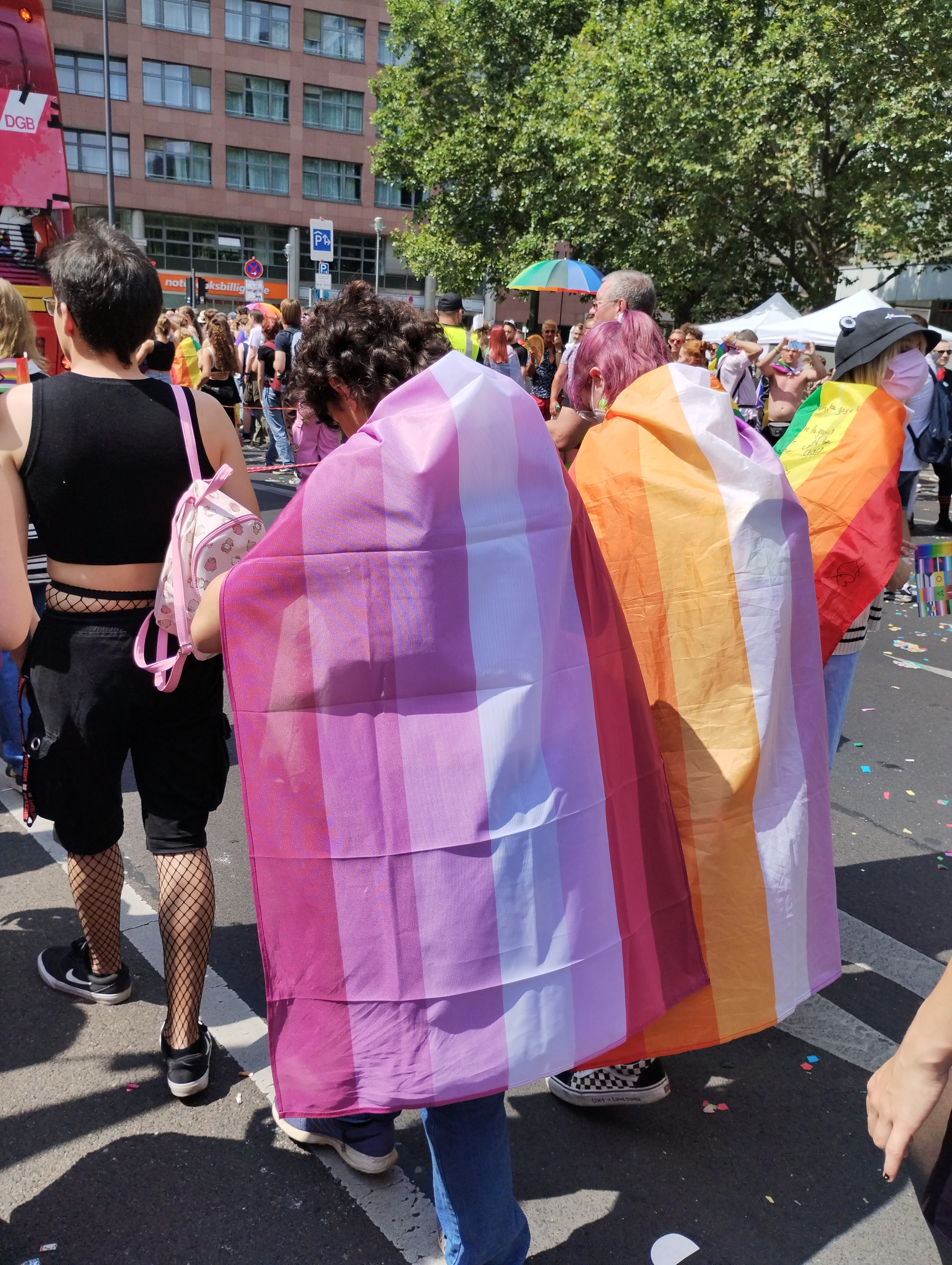
Lesbians wearing the Pink flag (left) and Orange-Pink flag (right) at Berlin Pride 2022

Lesbian flags are pride flags used to symbolise the lesbian community. Since the design of the labrys lesbian flag in 1999, many designs have been proposed and used, including the controversial lipstick lesbian flag. A five-stripe variant of the 2018 Orange-Pink lesbian flag is most widely used by the community today.

== History ==
=== Labrys flag (1999) ===
The Labrys lesbian flag consists of a labrys (a double-headed axe) superimposed on an inverted black triangle, set against a violet background. It was designed in 1999 by graphic designer Sean Campbell, and published in June 2000 in the Palm Springs edition of the Gay and Lesbian Times Pride issue.

The lesbian feminist movement adopted the labrys as a symbol in the 1970s, due to its association with the Amazons of Greek mythology. The black triangle was used in Nazi concentration camps as a badge of shame to mark "asocials" (including Roma and Sinti people, disabled people, and lesbians). Some lesbians reappropriated the symbol, similarly to the pink triangle. The color violet is associated with lesbians via the poetry of Sappho.

As early as 2009, lesbians were also using a variant of the rainbow flag, with a dark blue canton containing the interlocking female symbol ⚢.

Labrys lesbian flag created in 1999

Lesbian pride variant of the rainbow flag with the double-Venus symbol

=== Lipstick flag and Pink flag (2010) ===
The lipstick lesbian flag consists of seven horizontal stripes in a gradient from dark magenta (top) to white (center) to red (bottom), with a red kiss mark superimposed in the top left corner. It was designed in 2010 by lesbian blogger Natalie McCray, and symbolizes lipstick lesbians—slang for highly feminine lesbians. The flag has not been widely adopted due to some lesbians complaining that it is not inclusive of butch lesbians, while others have argued that McCray wrote biphobic, racist, and transphobic comments on her now-defunct blog.

The Lipstick flag was quickly supplanted by a variant with the same seven colors, but with the kiss mark removed. This version, called the "pink lesbian flag" attracted more use as a general pride flag for lesbians.

Illustration of Lipstick lesbian flag created in 2010. (This is not the original design: the kiss graphic has been modified.)

Pink lesbian flag, derived from the lipstick lesbian flag. (Design modifier is uncredited.)

=== Butch flags (2016 and 2017) ===
In 2016, Tumblr user Dorian Rutherford designed a butch lesbian pride flag consisting of a seven-stripe gradient from blue to white to purple. University of Iowa historian Caroline Radesky considers this a reaction to the perception of the pink flag as primarily representing femme lesbians to the exclusion of butches, replacing its "feminine" colors with "masculine" cool tones, to represent butch and non-femme lesbians.

A second butch lesbian pride flag, attributed to a moderator named "Jim", was published in 2017 in Tumblr blog butchspace, this one containing red, orange, white, yellow, and brown stripes. According to its creator, the seven stripes (from top to bottom) represent (1) passion and sexuality, (2) courage, (3) joy, (4) renewal, (5) chivalry, (6) warmth, (7) honesty.

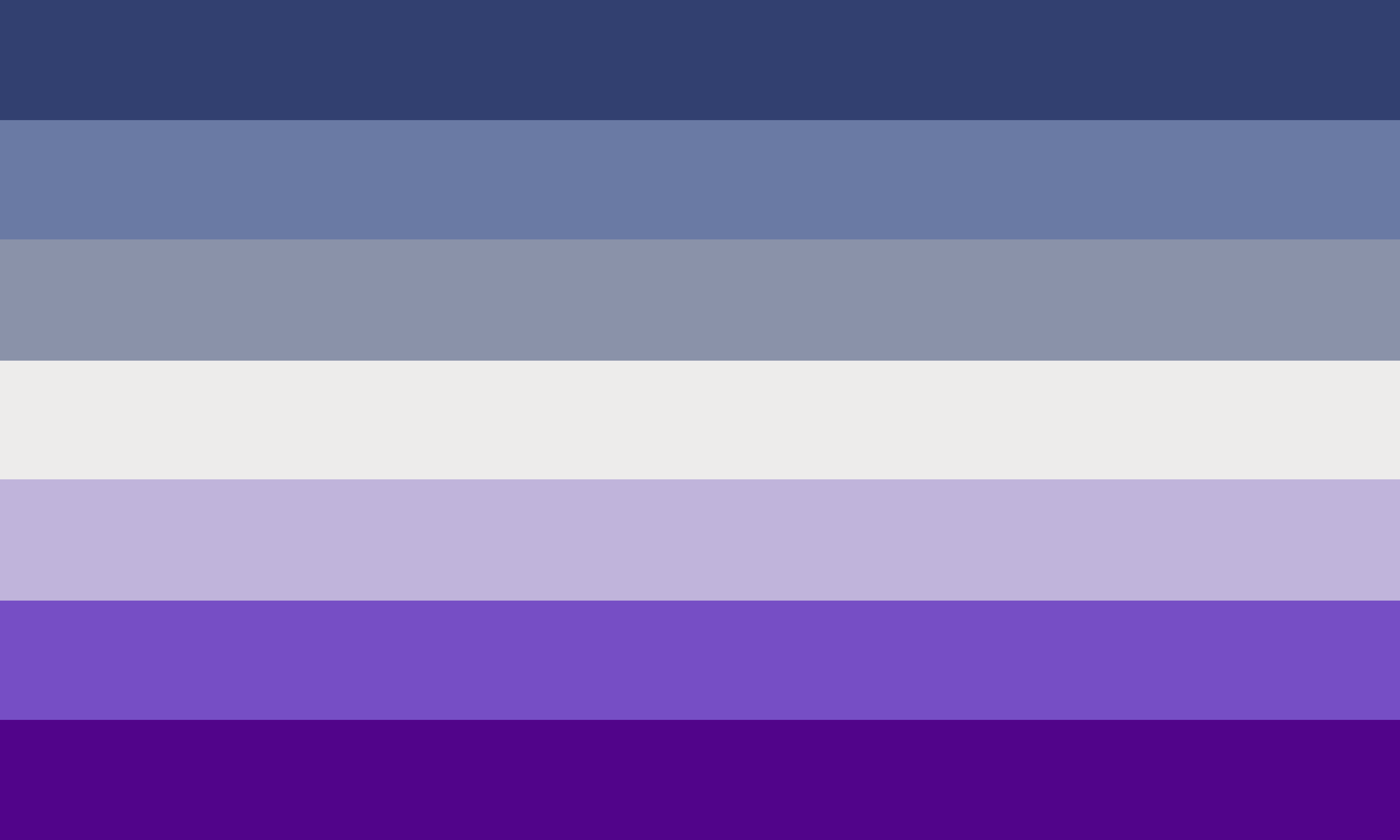
Butch flag published in 2016 by Tumblr user dorian-rutherford.

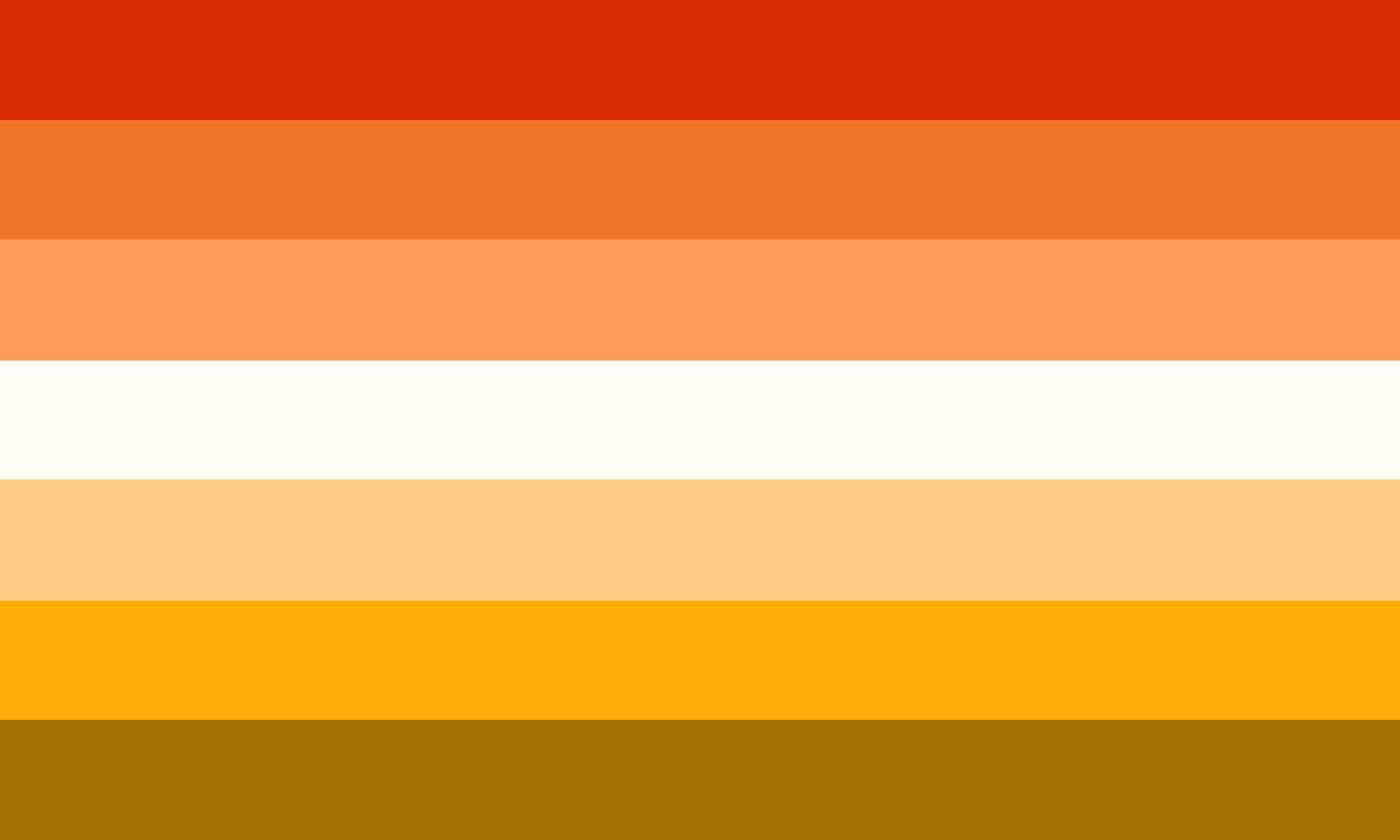
Butch flag published in 2017 on Tumblr blog butchspace.

=== Orange-Pink flag (2018) ===
The orange-pink lesbian flag (sometimes called the "Sunset" flag) combines the three magenta-pink stripes from the top of the pink flag, with the three red-orange stripes from the lesbian butch flag. Though an otherwise identical, inverted flag was created by Tumblr blogger "shapeshifter-of-constellation" in 2017, the orange-pink flag was attributed to Tumblr blogger Emily Gwen in 2018, and was popularized by a Tumblr poll seeking an official flag for the lesbian community. According to Gwen, the flag's seven colors symbolize: (1) red-orange: gender non-conformity, (2) orange: independence, (3) light orange: community, (4) white: unique relationships to womanhood, (5) pink: serenity and peace, (6) dusty pink: love and sex, (7) dark rose: femininity.

Tumblr user "taqwomen" soon derived a five-striped variant of this flag, omitting the second and sixth stripes. As of 2026, this version of the Orange-Pink flag is the most commonly used lesbian flag to represent the community.

Orange-pink lesbian flag derived from the pink flag in 2018

Five-stripes variant of orange-pink flag

== Gallery ==
=== Flags at events ===
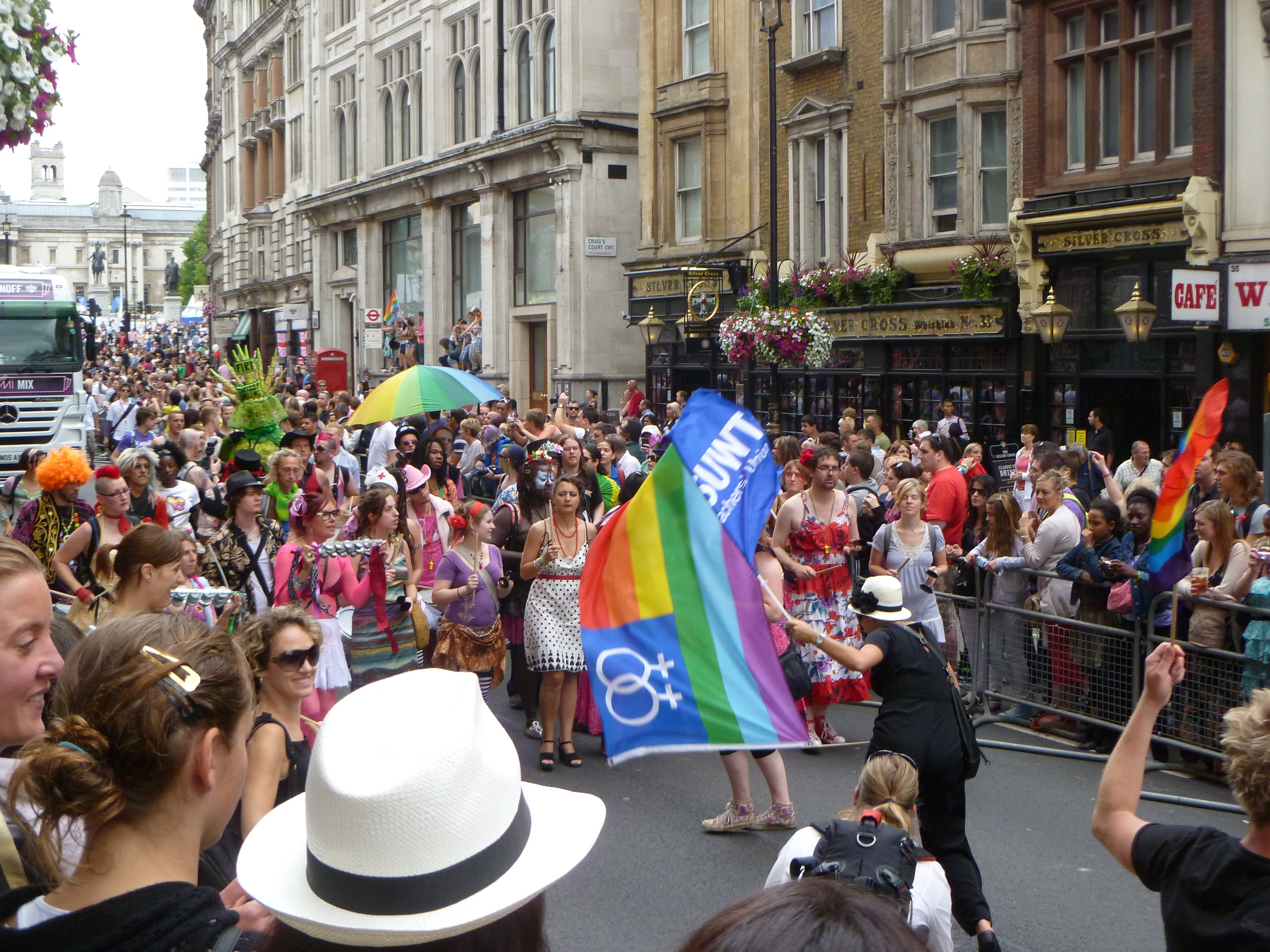
Double-Venus rainbow flag at London Pride parade, England, 2011

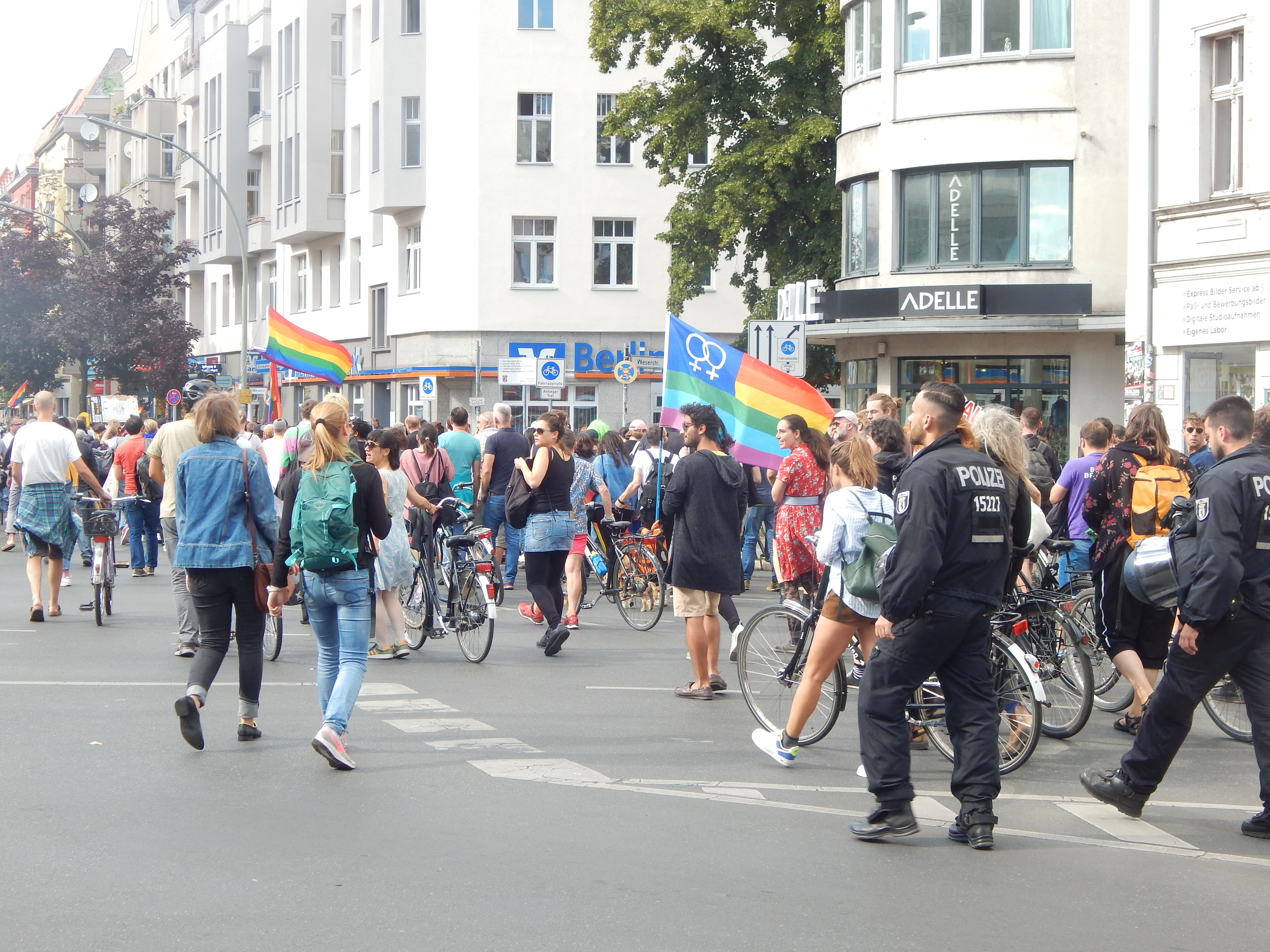
Double-Venus rainbow flag at Istanbul Pride solidarity demonstration, Berlin, Germany, 2018

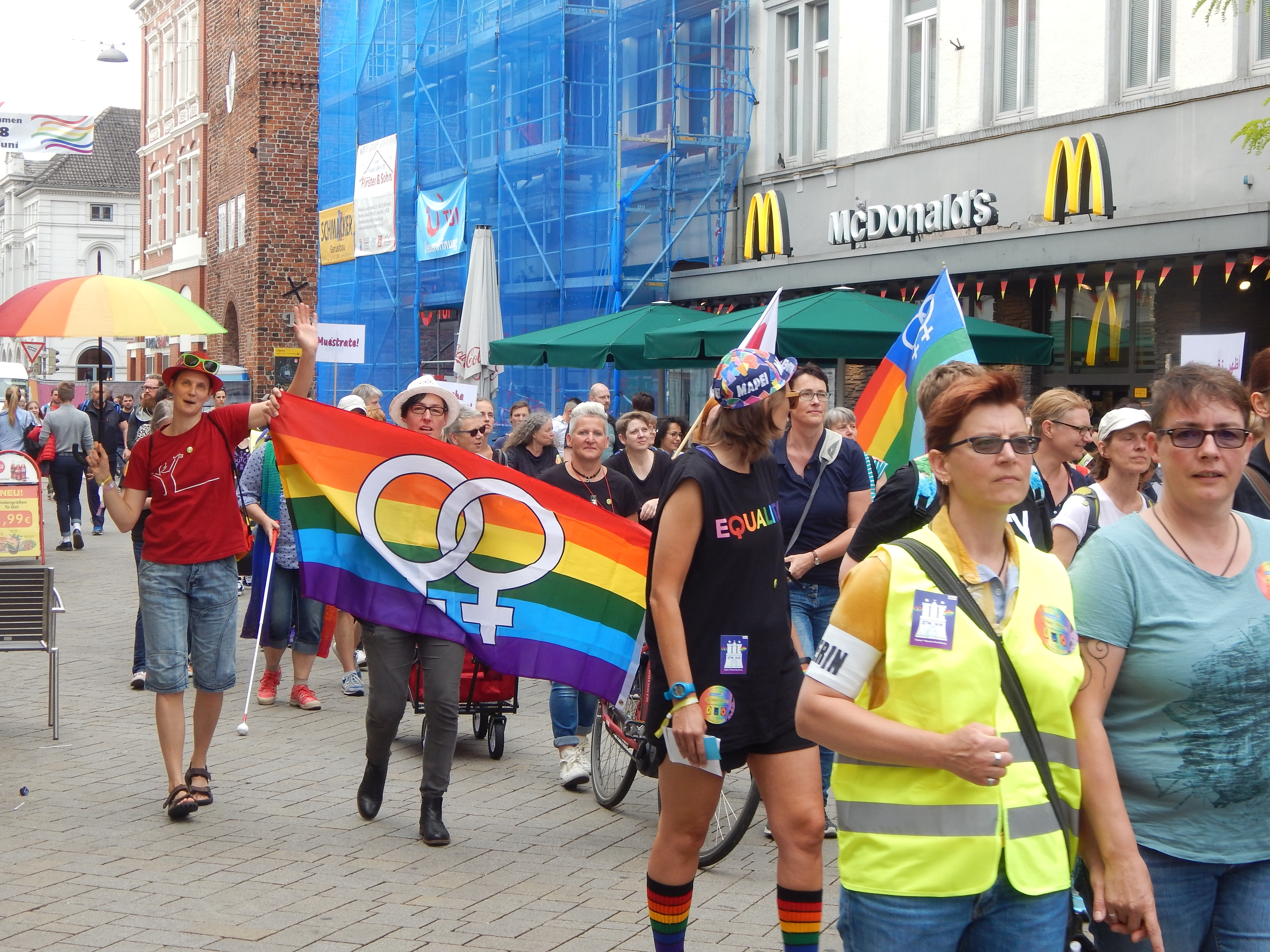
Double-Venus rainbow flags at Oldenburg Dyke March, Germany, 2018

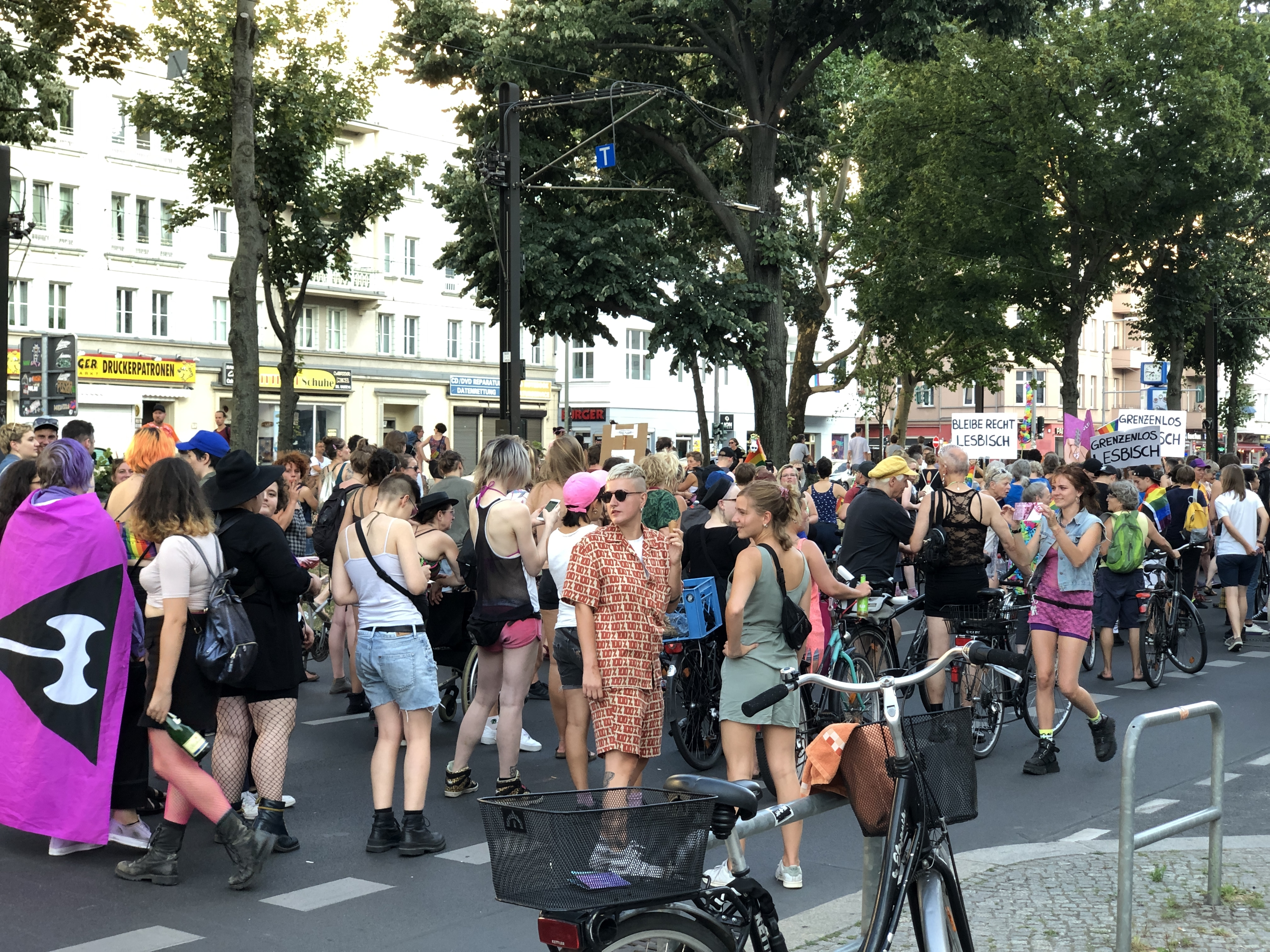
Labrys flag at Berlin Dyke March, Germany, 2019

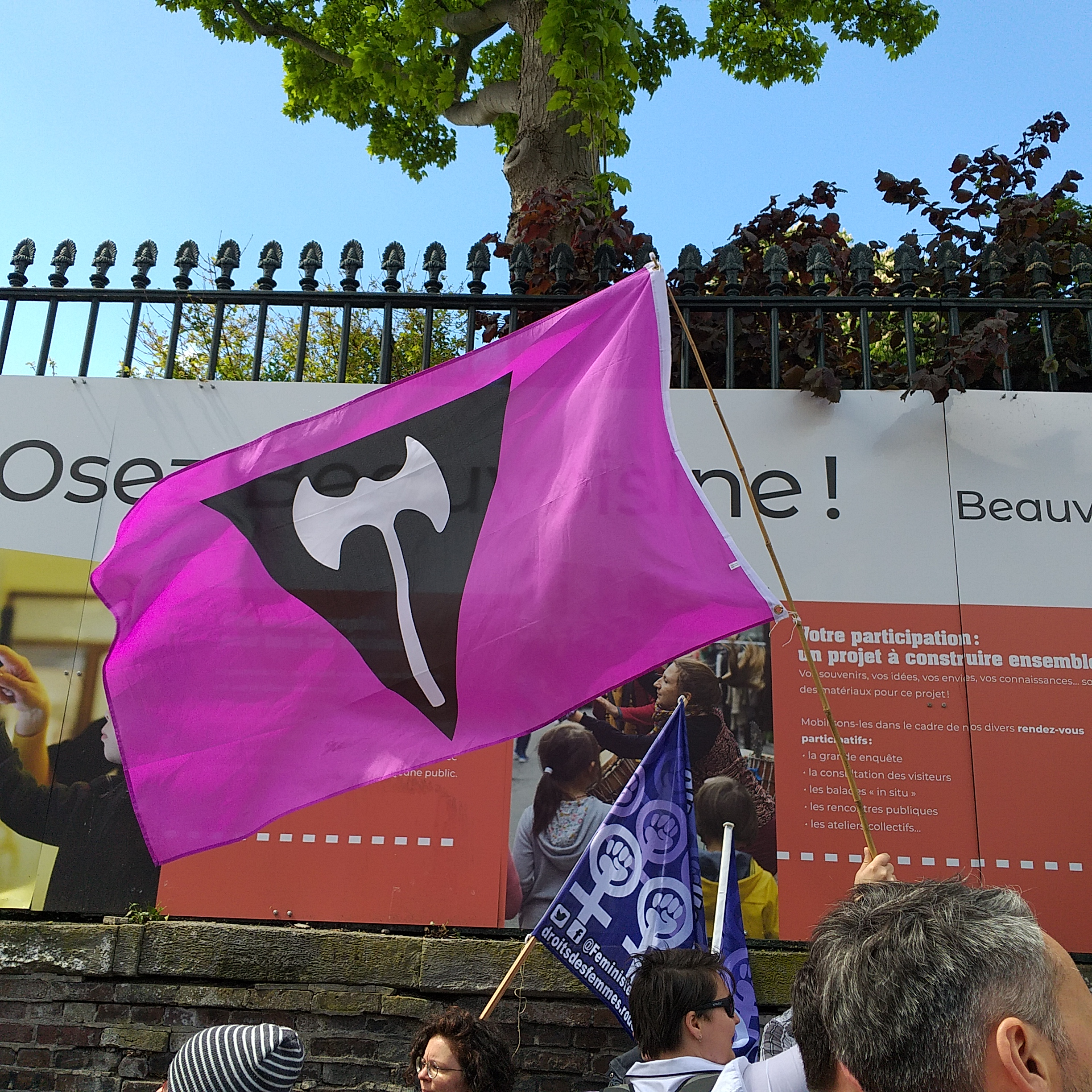
Labrys flag at Pride March, Rouen, France, 2019

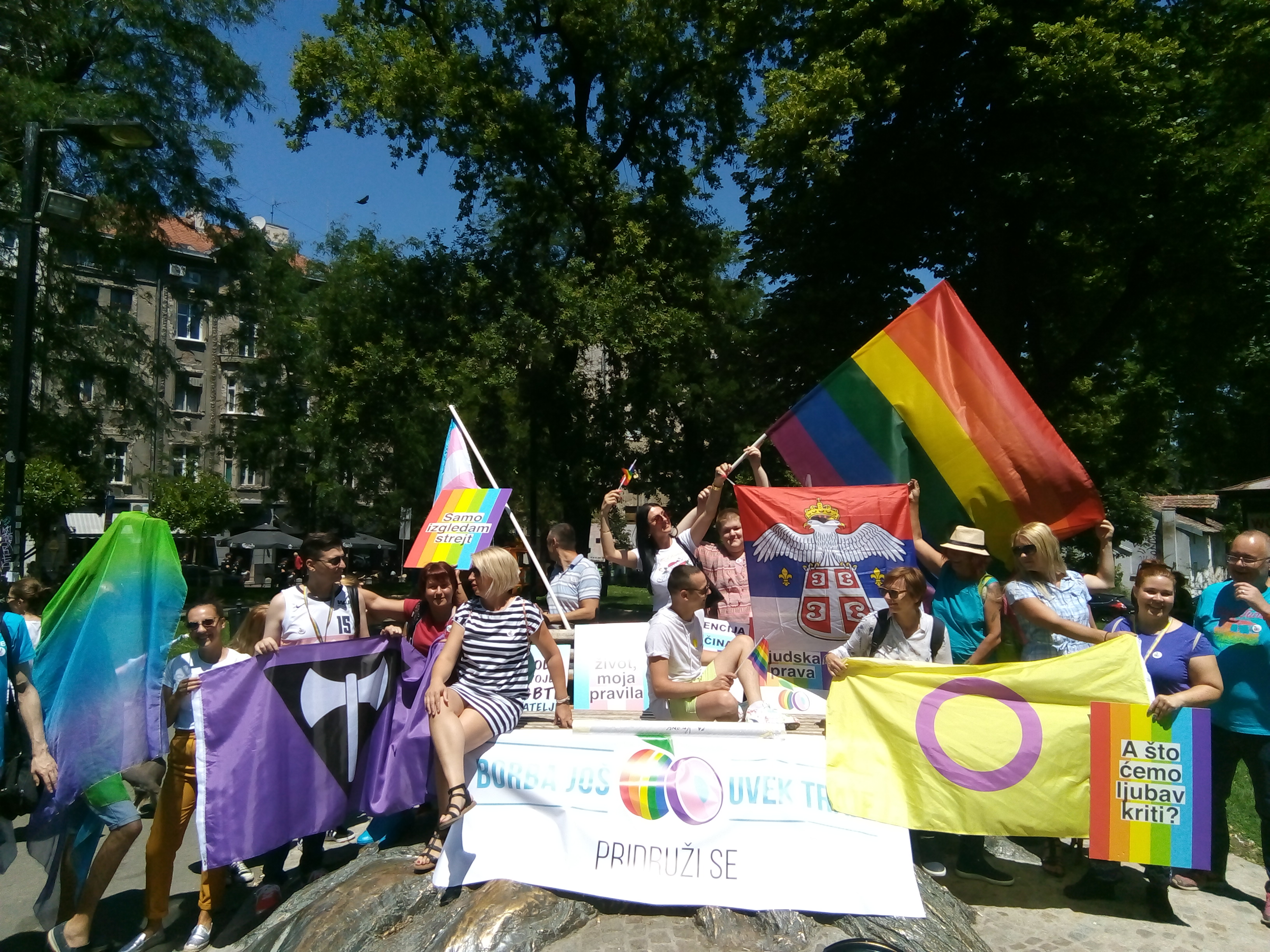
Labrys flag at Pride Serbia, Belgrade, Serbia, 2019

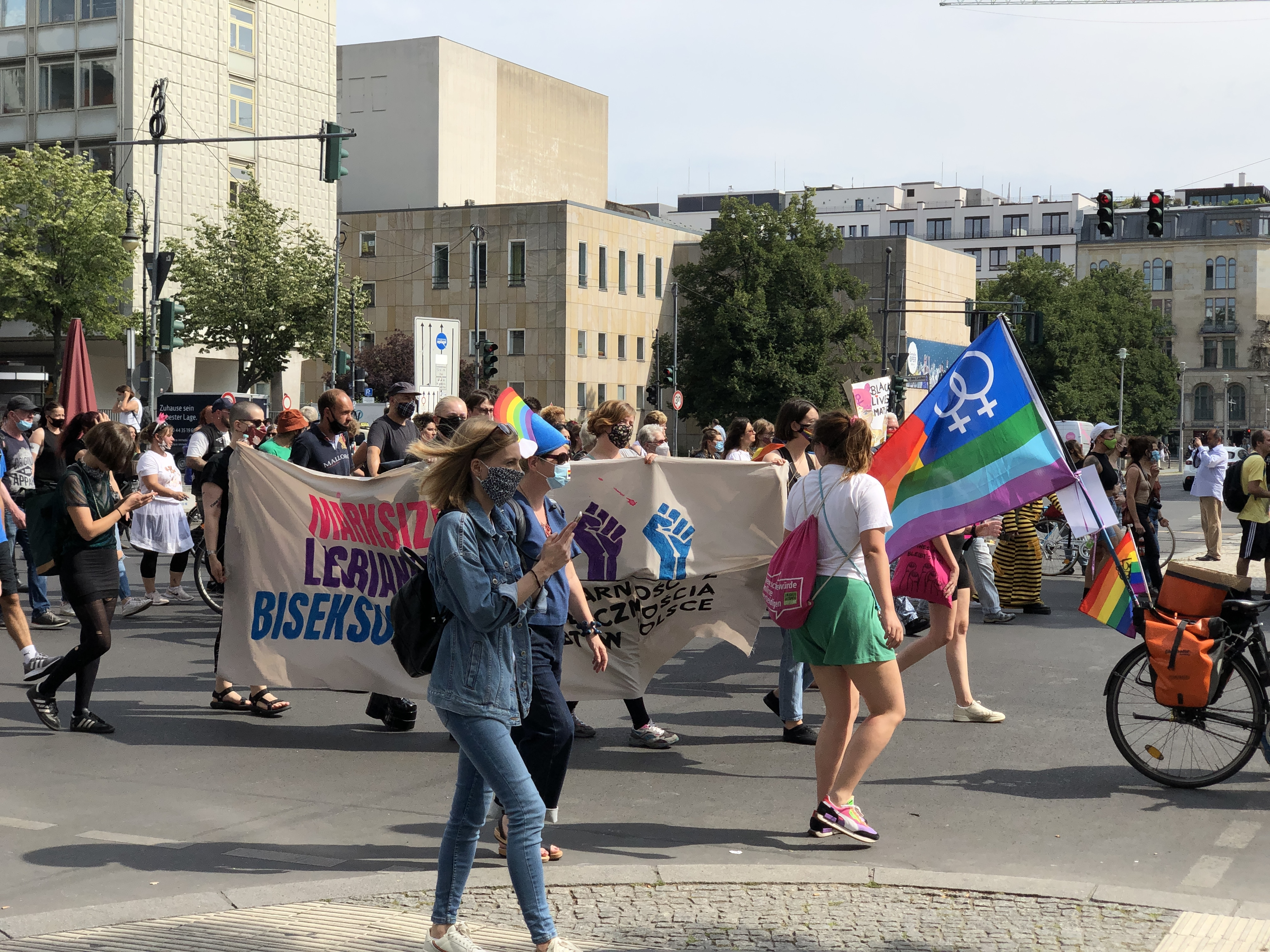
Double-Venus rainbow flag at Berlin Dyke March, Germany, 2020

== See also ==
- LGBTQ symbols
