= List of gay characters in animation =

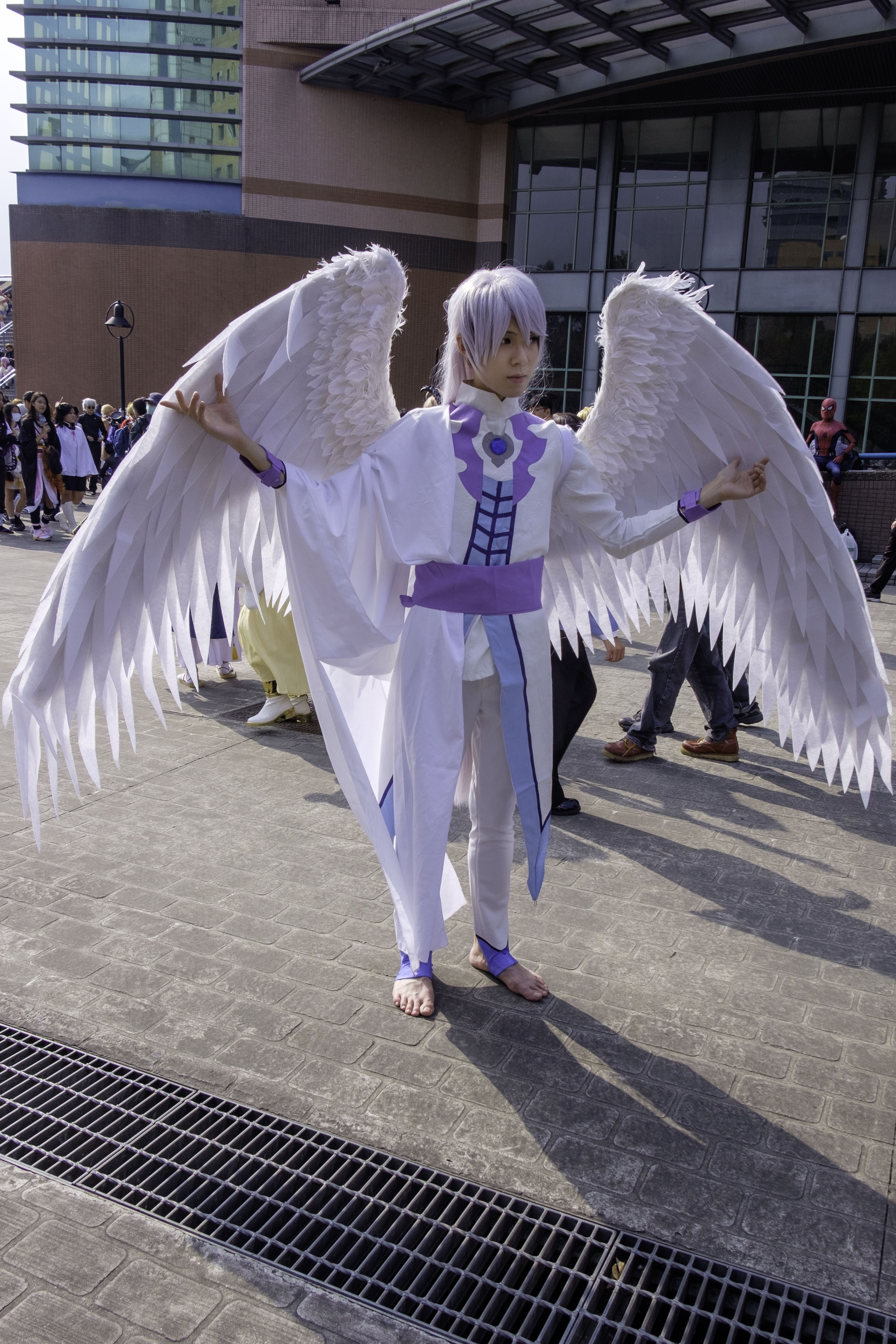
Cosplay of Yukito Tsukishiro / Yue. He is a gay character in Cardcaptor Sakura

This is a list of fictional characters that either self-identify as gay or have been identified by outside parties to be gay, becoming part of gay media. Listed characters are either recurring characters, cameos, guest stars, or one-off characters in animated series, but not animated films. This article also includes any characters in Japanese animation, otherwise known as anime. There are also corresponding lists of lesbian, non-binary, and bisexual animated characters.

For characters in other parts of the LGBTQ community, see the lists of lesbian, trans, bisexual, non-binary, pansexual, asexual, and intersex characters.

The names are organized alphabetically by surname, or by single name if the character does not have a surname. If more than two characters are in one entry, the last name of the first character is used.

== From the 1980s to the 1990s ==
Characters	Show title	Character debut date	Notes	Country
Ace	The Ambiguously Gay Duo	September 28, 1996	These two superheroes, Ace and Gary, engage in acts of heroism which are "ambiguously homosexual".	United States
Big Gay Al	South Park	September 3, 1997	He is a stereotypical homosexual man known for his flamboyant and positive demeanor introduced in the episode "Big Gay Al's Big Gay Boat Ride". Big Gay Al openly displays his homosexuality and is an advocate for gay rights. He is married to Mr. Slave as shown in the episode "Follow That Egg!"	United States
Jack Barbarosa Bancoran	Patalliro!	April 8, 1982	He enjoys flirting with and seducing bishounen, having the name of "Bishounen Killer." Women have shown interest in him and he shows no interest, though he did show mild interest in Pataliro's mother Etrange.	Japan
General Blue	Dragon Ball	January 14, 1987	A canon gay character and Nazi, who is series antagonist, having an entire saga focused on him. He also makes an appearance in Dragon Ball GT.	Japan
Bruce	Family Guy	April 18, 1999	Bruce often talks to his roommate Jeffrey. It is implied that Bruce is gay and that Jeffrey is his domestic partner, as in "Road to the North Pole" where he states in the song "All I Want for Christmas" that he wants a wedding ring from a guy named Jeffrey. In "Meg's Wedding", Bruce briefly had a romantic relationship with Meg until they ended it on the wedding day after Bruce finally accepted himself as gay. Bruce finally got engaged to Jeffrey in a parking lot since the priest wouldn't allow them to marry in the church.	United States
Daryl	Ai no Kusabi	August 1, 1992	Daryl is an eighteen year old castrated boy who served as Iason's furniture and Riki's caretaker. He fell in love with Riki because of his pride and strong will.	Japan
Fish-Eye	Sailor Moon	March 4, 1995	The villain Fish-Eye is an effeminate cross-dressing man who is romantically interested in men as first shown in the episode "Meeting of Destiny: The Night Pegasus Dances." He was changed into a woman in the English dub.	Japan
Herbert Garrison	South Park	August 13, 1997	Originally presented as a closeted homosexual, the storylines have featured Garrison coming out as a gay man, then having a gender reassignment surgery to become female (known as Janet Garrison), becoming a lesbian, and then changing back a man. It is shown he still has feelings for his ex-boyfriend, Mr. Slave as shown in the episode "Follow That Egg!"	United States
Fiore	Sailor Moon R: The Movie	December 5, 1993	Fiore was a distant childhood friend of Mamoru. When he saw that Mamoru was with Usagi, he decided to kidnap him for himself in fear that Usagi and her friends would abandon Mamoru like how him and Mamoru were abandoned in the past.	Japan
Gary	The Ambiguously Gay Duo	September 28, 1996	An "ambiguously homosexual" superhero like his fellow superhero, Ace.	United States
Guy	Ai no Kusabi	August 1, 1992	Guy was Riki's lover prior to his capture and Guy is determined to save Riki from Iason.	Japan
Stein Heigar	Infinite Ryvius	October 6, 1999	Stein Heigar is a member of the group Zwei. Heigar is gay.	Japan
Eugene Horowitz	Hey Arnold!	October 7, 1996	On July 26, 2016, the show's creator Craig Bartlett stated that Eugene "is kind of 'proto-gay', so he's uncomfortable getting close to any girl" during an interview with BuzzFeed, though this was never explicitly stated during the series. Bartlett stated: "We always figured Eugene was kind of proto-gay. He's not gay yet, he just will be. He loves musical theater, and he's a wonderful guy."	United States
Saddam Hussein	South Park	April 1, 1998	Within the South Park series and film Saddam Hussein and Satan are presented as a gay couple.	United States
Iason	Ai no Kusabi	August 1, 1992	He is the most superior and powerful Blondie in Tanagura, and the head of the Syndicate, Tanagura's black market for pet trade. He is in love with his pet Riki, a mongrel from the slums, and later he begins to love Riki to the point of obsession.	Japan
Itsuki	Yu Yu Hakusho	June 11, 1994	Itsuki is Sensui's right hand and is interested in him as shown in episodes 85 and 86, for example.	Japan
John	The Simpsons	February 16, 1997	Owner of a collectibles shop. Character from an episode, "Homer's Phobia", voiced by gay actor and director John Waters. This character was used as an example for issues with homosexuality and the show expressing thoughts and feelings for them. He is also the first LGBT character that the show used.	United States
Honjō Kamatari	Rurouni Kenshin	June 18, 1997	A crossdresser and member of the Juppongatana, they are gay and are in love with Shishio Makoto as shown in the episode "To Make a Miracle: The Battle at the Aoiya." They tend to dress as a woman but know they will never be as loved like the female Yumi or Shishio's right-hand man since Sojiro is far more skilled.	Japan
Kirie	Ai no Kusabi	August 1, 1992	A wild member of the Bison gang who is ambitious and sly. Riki hates him as he reminds him of his former rebellious self but Kirie himself is romantically obsessed with Riki.	Japan
Kitsunezuka Ko'on-no-Kami / Seymour "The Big" Cheese	Kyatto Ninden Teyandee / Samurai Pizza Cats	February 1, 1990	Kitsunezuka Ko'on-no-Kami (Seymour "The Big" Cheese) is the advisor to Tokugawa Iei Iei (Emperor Fred) who wants to overthrow Edoroplis (Little Tokyo). He is a flamboyantly gay fox who crossdresses and flirts with his male subordinates. Throughout the series, Ko'on-no-Kami is shown to be in love with Karasu Gennarisai (Jerry Atric), his elderly crow second-in-command and head of the Karakara Clan (Ninja Crows). In contrast with most 1990s English language dubs at the time, The Big Cheese's gender and sexuality were kept. The only change was his species as he was changed to a rat. His voice in the English dub is an imitation of Paul Lynde who was gay.	Japan
Kunzite	Sailor Moon	June 13, 1992	A powerful general who works for Queen Beryl from the Dark Kingdom and is in a couple with Zoisite.	Japan
Dewey Largo	The Simpsons	December 17, 1989	Mr. Largo is the school's music teacher, whose last name is also an Italian word for a slow, broad, musical tempo. A recurring gag in episodes such as "See Homer Run", are allusions that Largo is gay. A later episode, "Flaming Moe", confirmed that Largo is gay and in a relationship with an older man, also named Dewey.	United States
Larry	Crapston Villas	October 27, 1995	The boyfriend of Robbie in this series.	United Kingdom
Lexington	Gargoyles	October 24, 1994	According to series creator Greg Weisman, Lexington is gay.	United States
Lokar	Space Ghost Coast to Coast	December 25, 1994 (Note: Lokar was first mentioned in a September 16, 1994, episode)	Lokar is a locust alien and member of the Council of Doom. He is Zorak's rival. Lokar, is the opposite of Zorak as in he is a cultured snob, as opposed to being a crude slob like Zorak. There are hints throughout the series that Lokar is gay. He has referred to male characters as either lover or darling and appeared to have romantic feelings for Moltar as shown in the episodes "Explode", "Surprise" and "Waiting for Edward". Supplementary material for the series had Lokar referred to himself as a Confirmed bachelor. One article for Lokar's section in the official Cartoon Network website titled Lokar's Sumptuous Salute to Summer Frolic features a reference to a slang word for gay sex. Lokar disappeared after the fifth season. His sexuality was confirmed in audio commentaries for the Space Ghost Coast to Coast Volume 2 DVD. It was also revealed that Lokar died at some point during the series. However this was eventually contradicted when Lokar returned in the Season 11 episode "Stephen" in where he is shown to be alive and well. Lokar also appeared in Space Ghost.	United States
Fred Luo	Outlaw Star	February 12, 1998	Fred is a 20-year-old camp weapons merchant who is known to be flamboyant and openly gay, as first shown in the episode "The Beautiful Assassin." He has a strong infatuation for the series' main protagonist, Gene Starwind, whom he supplies arms to. Some criticized the character as representing harmful gay stereotypes.	Japan
Maraich	Patalliro!	May 13, 1982	Ex-assassin bishounen who becomes Bancoran's lover later in the series.	Japan
Randy Munchnik	Futurama	April 6, 1999	Often appearing in crowds and angry mobs, he is an "effeminate male" who may be gay. He likes parts of the Bible, even once creating a Noah's Ark "filled with same sex pairings of each species," and is good friends with Fry. He is later in a relationship with Soupy and both have a pet poodle together.	United States
Professional beach bully	Futurama	November 7, 1999	A one-time character, he is a bully which destroys Fry's sandcastle, assuming that Leela is his girlfriend, and when Leela asks him out he refuses, declaring that he is gay.	United States
Otokosuki	Dragon Ball Z	January 24, 1996	A stereotypical gay participant in the 28th World Martial Arts Tournament, where he "freaks out Goten and Trunks with his flirtations," with his name translating literally to "man love." He also makes an appearance in Dragon Ball GT.	Japan
Mr. Nigel Ratburn	Arthur	October 7, 1996	Arthur's schoolteacher, Mr. Ratburn, and another man, Patrick, get married in the season 22 premiere, which aired on May 13, 2019. As a result, he and his husband are the only LGBT characters in the series.	
Mr. Nigel Ratburn	Arthur	October 7, 1996	Arthur's schoolteacher, Mr. Ratburn, and another man, Patrick, get married in the season 22 premiere, which aired on May 13, 2019. As a result, he and his husband are the only LGBT characters in the series.	Canada
Robbie	Crapston Villas	October 27, 1995	The series was one of the first animated series on British television to present openly gay characters, Robbie and Larry.	United Kingdom
Kyouichi Saionji	Revolutionary Girl Utena	April 2, 1997	Saionji is the vice-president of the Student Council and captain of the kendo team. Kyouichi is temperamental, egotistical, prone to angry rages, and often cruel. His lack of self-control stems from insecurity, a lifelong homoerotic rivalry against Touga from which he is always at the losing end. Its implied that he is closeted and tries to deny it by overperforming his masculinity. Kyouichi has feelings for Touga and has engaged in homoerotic activities with him as shown in episodes 36 and 37. He is obsessed with Anthy not because he is in love with her but because he views the Rose Bride as a mindless doll who will never disobey him, and won't threaten his masculinity.	Japan
Satan	South Park	April 1, 1998	Satan is a boyfriend of Saddam Hussein in the series.	United States
Mr. Robert Simmons	Hey Arnold!	September 22, 1997	On July 26, 2016, the show's creator Craig Bartlett confirmed that Mr. Simmons was indeed gay during an interview with BuzzFeed. Several episodes throughout the series hinted at Mr. Simmons' sexuality, including "Arnold's Thanksgiving", a Thanksgiving-themed episode which implies that one of his dinner guests is his boyfriend and that Simmons' mother wants him to date a female friend. However, it was never explicitly stated he was gay.	United States
Skeleton	SuperTed	October 4, 1983	Skeleton is one of Texas Pete's two henchmen. He is a living skeleton who is cowardly and behaves in a campy and effeminate manner. Skeleton has the ability to put himself back together after falling apart. He was confirmed to be gay in a 2014 interview with series creator Mike Young. He also appears in The Further Adventures of SuperTed.	Wales
Waylon Smithers	The Simpsons	January 21, 1990	Smithers is a semi-closeted gay man. Waylon Smithers and Patty Bouvier ride a float called "Stayin' in the Closet!" during Springfield's annual gay pride parade in a 2002 episode, "Jaws Wired Shut". In a 2016 episode, "The Burns Cage", Smithers officially come out as gay. In "Portrait of a Lackey on Fire", Smithers had a new boyfriend named Michael de Graaf, voiced by gay actor Victor Garber.	United States
Sparky and the animals in Big Gay Al's Big Gay Animal Sanctuary	South Park	September 3, 1997	In one episode, Stan's dog Sparky is shown to be gay, and Big Gay Al is the owner of Big Gay Al's Big Gay Animal Sanctuary, a sanctuary for gay animals, including horses, rabbits, fish, a lion, etc.	United States
Craig Tucker	South Park	December 17, 1997	Craig and Tweek are seen frequently throughout the nineteenth, twentieth, and twenty-first seasons holding hands and hanging out with each other, shown in episodes such as "Tweek x Craig" and "Put It Down". It is confirmed by the official website and blog that they are in a relationship, and that they became an official couple in the episode "Tweek X Craig". Craig also had an unnamed girlfriend before he realized he was gay, and dumped her.	United States
Tweek Tweak	South Park	December 17, 1997	Craig and Tweek are seen frequently throughout the nineteenth, twentieth, and twenty-first seasons holding hands and hanging out with each other, shown in episodes such as "Tweek x Craig" and "Put It Down". It is confirmed by the official website and blog that they are in a relationship, and that they became an official couple in the episode "Tweek X Craig". Craig also had an unnamed girlfriend before he realized he was gay, and dumped her.	United States
Tomo	Fushigi Yûgi	December 14, 1995	Tomo is one of the celestial warriors of Seiryuu and fights only for the sake of his love, Nakago, as shown in episodes like "Bewitched Warmth."	Japan
Yukito Tsukishiro	Cardcaptor Sakura	April 7, 1998	He is in a romantic relationship with Touya, with the official website calling him Touya's "best friend." As a result, Yukito rejects Sakura's feelings for him because he is in love with Touya. In February 2000, Owkawa said that "such a warm, gentle character like Yukito" is uncommon in CLAMP works, repeating the same in a 2004 interview. Ohkawa said in February 2000 that "you can see Yukito and Touya as being friends, or as going beyond that." Yukito's alternate form is Yue. He also appears in Tsubasa Reservoir Chronicle, as a High Priest, and Toya as a king, of the Clow Kingdom.	Japan
Touya Kinomoto	Cardcaptor Sakura	April 7, 1998		Japan
Daley Wong	Bubblegum Crisis	February 25, 1987	Daley is a sympathetically presented gay character.	Japan
Yue	Cardcaptor Sakura	May 25, 1999	He loves Clow Reed and embarrassed when Sakura points this out, making him realize that his life is worth living. At the same time, scholars state that Yue is intersex because he is "biologically sexless."	Japan
Zoisite	Sailor Moon	June 13, 1992	Zoisite and Kunzite, both powerful generals who work under Queen Beryl from the Dark Kingdom are an openly gay couple in the 90s anime series. Though, in some dubs in other countries, Zoisite's gender was changed to female for his feminine appearance and to make them a heterosexual couple instead; and in other dubs, they are changed into brotherly figures because of the closeness of their relationship.	Japan

== In the 2000s ==
Characters	Show title	Character debut date	Notes	Country
Soubi Agatsuma	Loveless	April 6, 2005	He often flirts with Ritsuka Aoyagi, due to his attraction to young boys. He later grows closer to Ritsuka.	Japan
The Alchemist	The Venture Bros.	September 3, 2006	The Alchemist and Shore Leave are in an on-again, off-again relationship. According to the show creators, The Alchemist is gay in a way that is "just incidental" while Shore Leave is a very "openly swishy queer proud guy."	United States
Ritsuka Aoyagi	Loveless	April 6, 2005	He is discomforted by the flirting by Soubi conducts toward him. He later gains feelings toward Soubi. His love affair, in the manga, with Soubi was described as falling into "both orthodox heterosexual and subversive homosexual contexts," as Ritsuka treats Soubi as an adult/ In an interview with Yun Kōga, she said that while she doesn't consider the manga yaoi, but her fans do.	Japan
Steve Ball	Rick & Steve: The Happiest Gay Couple in All the World	July 10, 2007	During the series, Steve has a bay with his partner Rick, a Filipino-American, and a lesbian couple (Dana and Kirsten).	United States
Rick Brocka	Rick & Steve: The Happiest Gay Couple in All the World	July 10, 2007	He is in a romantic relationship with Rick, with both having a baby with lesbian couple (Dana and Kirsten)	Canada
Terry Bates	American Dad!	May 1, 2005	He is in a romantic relationship with Greg Corbin and is presented as being very culturally sophisticated, at one point causing Stan to choose him over Francine as his guest to get into Avery Bullock's high-end party. He and Greg have a surrogate baby daughter, Liberty Belle.	United States
The Booty Warrior	The Boondocks	June 27, 2010	A one-time character and main antagonist in an episode of the third season. He is a serial rapist who one time raped To Catch a Predator host Chris Hansen which lead to his incarceration in prison. He also almost tried to rape Tom Dubois during a prison riot but ended up beaten by Tom.	United States
Bradley	South Park	March 20, 2007	In one episode, "Cartman Sucks", Bradley becomes Butters' "accountabili-buddy" at the gay conversion camp. When camp authorities find Bradley's 1979 male underwear catalog they are both punished. After Bradley realizes that he has a crush on Butters, he comes to the conclusion that he is beyond hope and decides to end his life, ultimately convinced to come back down to safety by Butters.	United States
Charlie	What It's Like Being Alone	June 26, 2006	Charlie is a literally flaming gay boy.	Canada
Colin	Colin	June 17, 2007	Colin is a middle-aged anthropomorphic Guinea Pig who is going through a midlife crisis and dealing with everyday problems as a single gay man.	The Netherlands
Greg Corbin	American Dad!	May 1, 2005	He is in a romantic relationship with Terry Bates and both have a penchant for minor bickering, flirting, and working on stereotypical "couples' issues" on the set or in other scenes of the show. He is a member of the Log Cabin Republicans.	United States
Djambi	Futurama	August 10, 2003	The valet of Hedonismbot who may have been in romantic relationship with that robot and it is unclear if their relationship continued.	United States
Duo	Legend of DUO	April 21, 2005	Vampire Duo discloses the secret of purana, an essence of living force, to humans so they may be able to survive past extinction as shown in multiple episodes. Duo is punished and his friend Zeig is sent to punish him, as they have an ongoing conversation about the importance of human existence throughout the series, as shown in episodes 3 and 6. Their relationship is not just platonic friendship, as he shows continuing attraction to Zeig. Zeig carries him to a future life in the final episode.	Japan
Adam Seymour Duckstein	Queer Duck	October 11, 2000	Adam is the main character of the series. He is presented as a stereotypical gay duck and has been a victim of gay bashing. However, in the series finale, he wakes up to discover that he had sex with a woman. Queer Duck is voiced by gay actor and comedian, Jim J. Bullock.	United States
Gus Duncz	Mission Hill	June 25, 2000	Gus and Wally are an elderly gay couple in their late 60s as shown in the episode "Andy and Kevin Make a Friend (or One Bang for Two Brothers)."	United States
Kei Enjouji	Kizuna: Much Ado About Nothing	March 3, 2001	Kei Enjouji, a young man who falls in love with Kendo student Ranmaru Samejima when they meet in middle school. Enjouji tries to romance Samejima, and despite him initially being cold, Samejima slowly warms up, and the pair become close. Their love grows stronger despite Enjouji is revealed to be the illegitimate son of Yakuza boss Takeshi Sagano, who tries to kill Samejima.	Japan
Ranmaru Samejima	Kizuna: Much Ado About Nothing	March 3, 2001	Kei Enjouji, a young man who falls in love with Kendo student Ranmaru Samejima when they meet in middle school. Enjouji tries to romance Samejima, and despite him initially being cold, Samejima slowly warms up, and the pair become close. Their love grows stronger despite Enjouji is revealed to be the illegitimate son of Yakuza boss Takeshi Sagano, who tries to kill Samejima.	Japan
Sunao Fujimori	Sukisho	January 8, 2005	Awoken by Sori Hashiba, who fell off a building, he has an alternate personality named Ran. The latter forms a romantic relationship with Yuru.	Japan
Enos Fry	Futurama	December 9, 2001	In one episode, "Roswell That Ends Well", Philip J. Fry travels to the past and meets his grandparents Enos and Mildred in their youth. Philip encourages Enos to marry Mildred and have children, to which he replies: "Yeah, folks say that. But did you ever get the feeling you're only going with girls 'cause you're supposed to?" Enos does not show any interest in a pin-up calendar featuring a girl in skimpy clothing, but he flips some pages and happily stares at the picture of a shirtless man, meaning he is gay or bisexual. Eventually, Enos is incinerated in an atomic bomb test, without having any children and Philip unknowingly impregnates Mildred, thus becoming his own grandfather.	United States
Gangstalicious	The Boondocks	December 11, 2005	A supporting character, he is a closeted homosexual and goes to great lengths to keep this secret from the public. He was formerly involved in a secret homosexual affair with a gangster named Lincoln who attempts to kill Gangstalicious for betraying their love while on tour, and at some point assaulted a record label executive and rapped about it on TRL only to be arrested later. He was also involved in a relationship with a hip-hop video vixen named Jessica Ethelberg, who later wrote a book revealing he was gay (despite the fact that there were already countless obvious clues to the fact beforehand) in the episode "The Story of Gangstalicious".	United States
Garfiel	Fullmetal Alchemist	July 12, 2009	A skilled automail engineer and the proprietor of Atelier Garfiel in the town of Rush Valley. He is rather effeminate and appears to prefer the company of men, which results in his acting largely as a source of comic relief in scenes that involve him, including his mentee, Winry.	Japan
Steven Arlo Gator	Queer Duck	October 11, 2000	Steven is Queer Duck's significant other. He is shy and insecure and is usually the voice of reason whenever Queer Duck gets himself or anyone else in trouble. He marries Queer Duck in a Jewish wedding in Vermont in one episode, "Wedding Bell Blues" (although they are often seen as having an open relationship); a moose was the rabbi.	United States
King Gorilla	The Venture Bros.	October 30, 2004	A talking gorilla super-villain and member of the Guild of Calamitous Intent. While in prison, he was attracted to the Monarch, another villain.	United States
Grady	The Simpsons	April 13, 2003	They are a stereotypical gay couple, who later break up, with Julio later married to Thad, shown in episodes such as "Three Gays of the Condo". Julio is known in later seasons for being Marge's recurring hairdresser.	United States
Bug Gribble	King of the Hill	April 28, 2002	In one of the episodes, "My Own Private Rodeo", Dale's father Bug has come out and participates in the gay rodeo circuit. Bug is married to Juan Pedro.	United States
Paul Guaye	Superjail!	September 28, 2008	He is the partner of fellow inmate Jean Baptiste Le Ghei. He was described, by the show's creators, as more feminine and intelligent than his partner, who was called a "bad boy."	United States
Sori Hashiba	Sukisho	January 8, 2005	He falls off a four-story building, awakening Sunao Fujimori, and forgets that Sunao is one of his dear friends. He also has an alternate personality named Yuru and forms a passionate and romantic connection with Ran, the alternate personality of Sunao.	Japan
John Herbert	Family Guy	November 15, 2001	Herbert is an elderly man. He has an ephebophiliac and hebephiliac attraction to young boys, and harbors unrequited love for underage teenager Chris Griffin, though most other citizens of Quahog are oblivious to his sexuality. His voice actor Mike Henry defines Herbert as a pedophile.	United States
Keita Itō	Gakuen Heaven	April 1, 2006	In this boy's love anime, which is based on a manga with similar themes, Keita is enrolled in Bell Liberty Academy despite the school being for the best of the best, and the fact he is average. His first friend is Endo who cares for him and Keita realizes Endo is a childhood friend of his and is the reason why Keita was admitted to Bell Liberty Academy. By the end of the anime, he realizes his feelings or Kazuki, confesses his love, and both become a couple.	Japan
Kyousuke Iwaki	Embracing Love	March 31, 2005	Iwaki comes from a conservative, traditionalist family while Youji Katou comes from an open and accepting family. Despite this, Katou ultimately wins Iwaki's heart, as shown in the first OVA, "Haru wo Daiteita," and shown in the series as a whole.	Japan
Jakotsu	Inuyasha	February 24, 2003	Jakotsu is a member of the Jakotsutō, a criminal band of seven assassins. He is shown as being flamboyant and having a strong preference for men, complimenting Koga's loin cloth, flirting with Inuyasha and Miroku, and complimenting Sesshomaru's appearance as shown in the episode "The Band of Seven, Resurrected!" In addition, he admits he likes cute boys but that seeing cute boys makes him want to chop them up, indicated in The "Enter Bankotsu, The Leader of the Band of Seven" episode.	Japan
Jasper	Family Guy	July 12, 2000	Jasper is a dog who is Brian Griffin's gay cousin. Jasper marries his partner Ricardo in "You May Now Kiss the... Uh... Guy Who Receives".	United States
Winston Jerome	The Boondocks	June 20, 2010	A one-time character who appeared in the third-season episode "Pause." He is a playwright stage actor who is also a cult leader who founded a theatrical cult for the purpose of having sex with men.	United States
Mark "Dion" Jones	Braceface	September 8, 2002	Canon gay male character. In the episode "Game, Set-up and Match," Sharon even tried to set Dion up for a date but it didn't work out.	Canada
Julio	The Simpsons	April 13, 2003	Once in a relationship with Grady, he later breaks up with him, marries Thad, and is Marge's recurring hairdresser.	United States
Hiroki Kamijou	Junjou Romantica	April 10, 2008	Hiroki used to be in love with Akihiko Usami, as shown in the episode "Knock and it shall be opened unto you," but later falls in love with and enters a relationship with Nowaki Kusama.	Japan
Suguru Kashiwagi	Maria-sama ga Miteru	January 21, 2004	In the anime, Kashiwagi, who is student council president of an all-boys school named Hanadera Academy, is said to be engaged to Sachiko Ogasawara, but is not interested in her, drawing her anger. The official site for the series said that Kashiwagi nicknames Yuki Fukuzawa "Yukichi" and says he is "strangely fond of him." In the manga and novels it is confirmed that Kashiwagi is gay because he is interested in Yuki, the brother of Yumi, who is the sœur of Sachiko.	Japan
Youji Katou	Embracing Love	March 31, 2005	He wins over Kyousuke Iwaki romantically and both later begin a romantic relationship.	Japan
Endō Kazuki	Gakuen Heaven	April 1, 2006	A childhood friend of Keita Itō and the reason he was admitted to Bell Liberty Academy, and a person who cares for him. At the end of the series, he confesses his feelings to Itō (who does the same) and both become a couple.	Japan
Kevin	6teen	December 21, 2006	Co-worker of Caitlin at the Big Squeeze who appears in the episode "Bicker Me Not," and implied to be gay.	Canada
Yuichi Kudo	Doki Doki School Hours	April 4, 2004	A male honor student who is gay and in love with Suetake, clear from the show's first episode. He is seen having fantasies about Suetake, and not much else.	Japan
Wally Langford	Mission Hill	June 25, 2000	Wally is the partner of Gus, who is also in his late 60s.	United States
Larry 3000	Time Squad	June 8, 2001	Larry 3000's voice actor, Mark Hamill, implied Larry could easily have been interpreted as gay in the cartoon, due to his femininity and presentation as the "gay best friend" to Cleopatra in "Shop like an Egyptian", although Larry has stated on multiple occasions he dislikes humans in general. However, this show never stated his sexuality, although Hamill described him as fierce and flamboyant.	United States
Leeron Littner	Gurren Lagann	April 8, 2007	Leeron is a flamboyant homosexual and flirts with Kamina, Simon, Gimmy and Viral as shown in episodes like "Said I'm Gonna Pilot That Thing!!"	Japan
Jean Baptiste Le Ghei	Superjail!	September 28, 2008	The inmates Jean Baptiste Le Ghei and Paul Guaye are a recurring couple as shown in the episode "Superbar" and others. In an interview with the creators of the show, co-creator Christy Karacas called them well-rounded characters, who are a couple, with Paul as more feminine and intelligent than Jean who is "the bad boy".	United States
Bobby Margot	Macross Frontier	April 3, 2008	He is the flamboyant helmsman of the Macross Quarter and close friends with Ozma Lee, whom he has unrequited feelings for.	Japan
Evan Martinez	Rick & Steve: The Happiest Gay Couple in All the World	July 10, 2007	Chuck Masters and Evan Martinez are a male gay couple as indicated in episodes like "Mom Fight", with Chuck helping Evan with his drug addiction.	United States
Chuck Masters	Rick & Steve: The Happiest Gay Couple in All the World	July 10, 2007	Chuck Masters and Evan Martinez are a male gay couple as indicated in episodes like "Mom Fight", with Chuck helping Evan with his drug addiction.	Canada
Masumi Okuyama	Nodame Cantabile	January 25, 2007	Masumi, timpanist, is homosexual, and an okama. He loves Shinichi Chiaki as indicated in episodes like "Lesson 3: Queen of Percussion," seeing Nodome as a "rival for Chiaki's affections."	Japan
Yusuko Ono	Antique Bakery	July 3, 2008	A famed chef named Yusuko Ono, often out of job because "he is irresistible to men," leading coworkers to fight for his affection, works at a pastry shop headed by Keisuke Tachibana whose childhood drama makes him detest cake, a former top boxing champion, Eiji Kanda, and the childhood friend of Keisuke, Chikage Kobayakawa. The latter has a short affair with Yusuko.	Japan
Paul	The Cleveland Show	October 18, 2009	Terry, Cleveland's co-worker, marries his husband Paul in one episode, "Terry Unmarried." In the same episode, Cleveland asks if Terry is gay; Terry answers no, much to Cleveland's cheer. But Terry replies he's attracted to both genders, much to Cleveland's dismay.	United States
Juan Pedro	King of the Hill	April 28, 2002	He is married to Bug Gribble.	United States
Porilyn	Glass Maiden	April 8, 2008	Porilyn is an effeminate detective who works as a mediator for the more difficult jobs at the agency. He is openly gay and works as a drag queen.	Japan
Rico	Life's a Zoo	September 1, 2008	Rico is a stereotypically gay American crocodile with a Latino swish. In the episode "Truth or Consequences", it's revealed that Rico's accent is fake and he's actually from the United States. It is also revealed Rico was just a regular person who happen to be gay but was told to "gay it up" by the producers of the series.	Canada
Roy	Colin	June 17, 2007	Roy is Colin's ex-boyfriend. They both agree it was better if they were just friends.	The Netherlands
Shore Leave	The Venture Bros.	June 25, 2008	The series creators called him an "openly swishy queer proud guy."	United States
Seishirō Sakurazuka	X	November 28, 2001	He kills the sister of Subaru Sumeragi. Later, while Subaru Sumeragi did grow to love Seishirō, Seishirō couldn't reciprocate but killed Subaru's sister Hotaru per her request, and as Seishirō dies, he confesses his romantic feelings for him.	Japan
Shuichi Shindo	Gravitation	October 4, 2000	Shuichi Shindo falls in love with Eiri Yuki beginning in the first episode. Over the course of the series manages to melt the cold heart of Eiri and the two become a couple. In one episode, "Winding Road," it is revealed that Eiri has a fiancée named Ayaka, but she backs away after seeing the love between Shuichi and Eiri.	Japan
Shirogane	Monochrome Factor	April 7, 2008	He often flirts with Akira, a 16-year-old high school student who hates school, which is not shown in the manga, with the latter cooperating with him	Japan
Mr. Slave	South Park	November 20, 2002	Mr. Slave was Mrs. Garrison's boyfriend until she made the transition into a female in the episode "Mr. Garrison's Fancy New Vagina". He is now married to Big Gay Al, as of the episode, "Follow That Egg".	United States
Subaru Sumeragi	X	November 28, 2001	Subaru tries to hunt and kill Seishirō Sakurazuka for killing his sister and when he succeeds, he states he has killed the one he loves most. Their past is elaborated in the manga, Tokyo Babylon, where it was shown Seishirō would often flirt with and tried to seduce Subaru as part of a bet: if Subaru could make him fall in love with him, he wouldn't kill him. Later it is revealed that although Subaru did grow to love Seishirō, Seishirō couldn't reciprocate and when Seishirō dies, he confesses "I also.." before dying.	Japan
Sweden	Hetalia: Axis Powers	January 24, 2009	Sweden is gay but "only for Finland."	Japan
Misaki Takahashi	Junjou Romantica	April 10, 2008	Akihiko, a 28-year-old, had been in an unrequited love with Takahiro for years and even entered a temporary sexual relationship with Hiroki Kamijou to forget him, but failed. He later falls for Misaki Takahashi, Takahiro's younger brother. Misaki loves Akihiko from the beginning of the series but is embarrassed to admit so.	Japan
Akihiko Usami	Junjou Romantica	April 10, 2008	Akihiko, a 28-year-old, had been in an unrequited love with Takahiro for years and even entered a temporary sexual relationship with Hiroki Kamijou to forget him, but failed. He later falls for Misaki Takahashi, Takahiro's younger brother. Misaki loves Akihiko from the beginning of the series but is embarrassed to admit so.	Japan
Asato Tsuzuki	Descendants of Darkness	October 2, 2000	Asato and Hisoka begin to fall in love with each other, beginning from the show's first episode.	Japan
Wolfram von Bielefeld	Kyo Kara Maoh!	April 3, 2004	In another dimension called Shin Makoku, love between the same gender is not rare at all. Wolfram became Shibuya Yuuri's accidental fiancé after Yuuri slaps him on his left cheek for insulting his mother which actually is a traditional proposal amongst the nobles in Shin Makoku as shown in the show's second episode. Although he did not approve of being the Maoh's fiancé at first, he changes his mind when Yuuri's demon side kicks his butt in battle. He soon grows very protective over Yuuri, yelling at anyone who comes too close to him, indicates in the third OVA, "Dry Wind," and is especially jealous of Konrad, his own brother.	Japan
Xandir P. Wifflebottom	Drawn Together	October 27, 2004	Xandir, a "young video game warrior", is labeled as a "totally gay video game adventurer" during the show's first episode, and on a never-ending quest to save his girlfriend. In a later episode, "Gay Bash", he comes to terms with his homosexuality after having his arm bitten off by the Wood Beast, a creature that determines a person's sexuality by biting off the arms of homosexuals and keeping the arms of heterosexuals intact. In another episode, "Xandir and Tim, Sitting in a Tree", Xandir has an affair with Captain Hero's gay alter ego, Tim Tommerson.	United States
Woodhouse	Archer	September 17, 2009	Woodhouse, Archer's personal valet, is of ambiguous sexuality. He had a romantic and sexual attraction to another man, Reggie, during the First World War, but it has not been specified whether he has ever had any sexual feelings for anyone since Reggie's death. After his voice actor, George Coe, died, the show did a tribute to Woodhouse, who later had a funeral, becoming a plot thread followed up on in the show's eighth season.	United States
Zeig	Legend of DUO	April 21, 2005	A friend of Duo, with both having romantic relationship, and he carries Duo to a future life in the final episode. Afterwards, the narrator describes Duo and Zeig as vampires "in love."	Japan

== In the 2010s ==
Characters	Show title	Character debut date	Notes	Country
Adam	The Hollow	June 8, 2018	One of the protagonists of the series, Adam, a Hispanic boy, is revealed to be gay in season 2. In episode 2 of that season, "Hollow Games," he comes out to Kai, another of the show's protagonists, explaining he is gay and that Mira, a female protagonist is "not his type." Prior to this, in the trailer for Season 2 the LGBT pride flag was seen in his room, and in the first episode of that season, leading some fans to speculate he was gay. In the first season, he also shown no interest in Mira when she kissed him.	Canada
Aiden	Big Mouth	February 8, 2019	Aiden is Matthew's boyfriend who was introduced in the Valentine's Day special.	United States
Alexander	Big City Greens	June 27, 2018	In Tumblr, series creator Chris Houghton confirmed that Alexander and Terry are a couple, although protagonist Cricket Green does not seem to realize that they are gay throughout the series. Alexander is loud, rather effeminate and bossy, and Terry is silent and an introvert. They both appear to be hanging out with each other in episodes such as "Gridlocked", "Fill Bill", "Barry Cuda", and "Trailer Trouble". They are shown to be living together in the episode "Spaghetti Theory." Alexander is voiced by John Early, a gay actor.	United States
Prince Andrew	The Bravest Knight	June 21, 2019	The husband of Sir Cedric, and father of Nia.	United States
Nick Army	OK K.O.! Let's Be Heroes	August 1, 2017	Series creator Ian Jones-Quartey confirmed that Nick Army and Joff are a couple on Twitter. They marry in the show's final episode, "Thank You for Watching the Show".	United States
Ryo Asuka	Devilman Crybaby	January 5, 2018	Ryo Asuka is a genderless angel who is Akira Fudo's best friend, while Akira is the protagonist. Akira was the first person to show him kindness, causing him to become deeply attached. Near the end, Ryo remembers he is Satan, an intersex fallen angel who fell out of favor with God when he challenged God's authority for killing the demons and replacing them with humans. Satan set out to start a war between humans and demons and was reborn as a male. He fell in love with Akira and subconsciously had him turned into a devilman (a demon human hybrid) to ensure he would survive the war and be by his side. By the end of the series, Satan realizes he loves Akira despite having previously believed love did not exist and cries and mourns Akira's death.	Japan
Yū Asuka	Stars Align	October 17, 2019	Yū, formerly known as Yuta, is a kind and mild-mannered person, who Touma thinks of them as nice, even though he is unaware Yu has a crush on him, as noted in the second episode.	Japan
Bayani	16 Hudson	August 21, 2018	The adopted father of Luc and the partner of Paul.	Canada
Beefhouse	Twelve Forever	July 29, 2019	The partner of Mack, living in the fantasy world of Endless Island.	United States
Sheriff Blubs	Gravity Falls	June 29, 2012	In the series finale, the Sheriff Blubs and Deputy Durland publicly express their love for each other, confirming their romantic relationship.	United States
Aslan (Ash) Callenreese	Banana Fish	July 5, 2018	Ash and Eiji are in love with each other, spending much of their time together after meeting and even living together in an apartment for months on end. They share the same room, emotionally support each other, and kiss at one point in the media. Their relationship, despite not being inherently sexual due to Ash's CSA trauma, has greatly impacted the BL genre of both manga and anime. After Ash's death, Eiji does not marry or date anyone else.	Japan
Eiji Okumura	Banana Fish	July 5, 2018	Ash and Eiji are in love with each other, spending much of their time together after meeting and even living together in an apartment for months on end. They share the same room, emotionally support each other, and kiss at one point in the media. Their relationship, despite not being inherently sexual due to Ash's CSA trauma, has greatly impacted the BL genre of both manga and anime. After Ash's death, Eiji does not marry or date anyone else.	Japan
Sir Cedric	The Bravest Knight	June 21, 2019	This series tells the story of Cedric, his husband Andrew, and their adopted 10-year-old daughter, Nia, who wants to become a brave knight like Cedric. Cedric and Andrew are voiced by openly gay actors T. R. Knight and Wilson Cruz respectively.	United States
Chozen	Chozen	January 13, 2014	Chozen is a white, gay, aspiring rap superstar. He is in a relationship with fratboy-type Hunter.	United States
Mr. John Crab	Hey Duggee	June 24, 2015	Mr. John Crab and his mute husband Nigel Crab first appeared in the series 1 episode "The Sandcastle Badge".	United Kingdom
Nigel Crab	Hey Duggee	June 24, 2015	Mr. John Crab and his mute husband Nigel Crab first appeared in the series 1 episode "The Sandcastle Badge".	United Kingdom
Dalton Crespin	Bob's Burgers	December 10, 2017	He had a boyfriend whom he broke up with prior to the episode "The Bleakening" who is now dating another one of his ex-boyfriends.	United States
Dads of Corporate Raider Jim	Danger & Eggs	July 4, 2017	In the season 1 finale, it is revealed that Corporate Raider Jim, a married business executive who often shouts orders to his assistant in his cell phone, has two dads.	United States
Zip "Frantic" Danger	The Awesomes	September 5, 2013	Frantic, who is a "crazy fast" reject from a circus show, is forcibly outed under media pressure in "The Awesomes' Awesome Show". He later falls for Christopher, a member of villain team The Gay Mafia.	United States
Richard De Longpre	Allen Gregory	October 30, 2011	Richard is one of the fathers of the title character. Richard became one of Jeremy's, a former social worker who had a loving wife and family, clients. Richard was attracted to Jeremy to the point where he started stalking him and his family until Jeremy finally agreed to be his husband. Jeremy left his wife and children for Richard, who offered him an easy, no-maintenance life as his trophy husband	United States
Donizete	Super Drags	November 9, 2018	The series follows the adventures of Donizete, Patrick, and Ralph, three gay friends working in a department store, who are also drag queen superheroes, named Scarlet Carmesim, Lemon Chifon, and Safira Cyan are the Super Drags, and are responsible for protecting the LGBTQ community.	Brazil
El Dorado	Young Justice	May 26, 2012	He is a gay man who is dating Kid Flash, who was suggested to be gay by Greg Weisman, creator of the animated series.	United States
Deputy Durland	Gravity Falls	June 29, 2012	In the series finale, Deputy Durland expresses his love for Sheriff Blubs confirming their romantic relationship.	United States
Angel Dust	Hazbin Hotel	October 28, 2019	Angel Dust is a gay adult film star, the first patient at the Happy Hotel, and engages in advances toward Alastor, an asexual demon.	United States
Ethari	The Dragon Prince	November 22, 2019	He is married to leader of the assassins and father figure to Rayla.	United States
Falcon	She-Ra and the Princesses of Power	November 13, 2018	In the episode, "In Perils of Peekablue", Sea Hawk and Mermista hide behind a bar from some people who Sea Hawk has upset by setting their ships on fire. These include Admiral Scurvy, his crew, other patrons, and Falcon, the latter who ND Stevenson confirmed as Seahawk's ex-boyfriend. Mermista is implied to have an ex she is hiding from as well.	United States
Flix	Star Wars Resistance	October 7, 2018	He runs the Office of Acquisitions with Orka, and was confirmed as a couple by an executive producer for the series.	United States
Quentin Frowney	Steven Universe	November 18, 2013	He is in a long-time relationship with Harold Smiley.	United States
Galaxander	Twelve Forever	July 29, 2019	In the episode "Locals Forever," Galaxander shows a photo album to his friend, a fellow inhabitant of Endless Island, and comes across a photo and says, "Oh, that's my ex. How'd that get in there? Don't worry, I'm not in touch with him anymore."	United States
The Gayfather	The Awesomes	October 20, 2015	The Gayfather is the leader of villain team The Gay Mafia, including members like Christopher and Steven, and makes his debut in "The Gayfather". Christopher falls for Frantic immediately upon meeting him, and sabotages his team's efforts as a result.	United States
George	She-Ra and the Princesses of Power	April 26, 2019	It was revealed at New York Comic Con on October 4, 2018, by Aimee Carrero (voice of Princess Adora / She-Ra) that main character Bow has two dads, George and Lance. They first appear in the season two finale, "Reunion", where it is revealed that they are historians, living in a library in the Whispering Woods. They are initially unaware that Bow has been helping in the Rebellion. They make a brief appearance in episode "Return to the Fright Zone" in the show's final season.	United States
Ray Gillette	Archer	February 3, 2011	Ray is an openly gay secret agent, and a former Olympic medalist in skiing.	United States
Yamagi Gilmerton	Mobile Suit Gundam: Iron-Blooded Orphans	October 4, 2015	He's in love with another male, Norba Shino, claiming he'd rather die together with his love than to live without him.	Japan
Ghost Dad Kent	Summer Camp Island	July 7, 2018	Ghost the Boy, a ghost and Betsy's ex-boyfriend, has two dads as his parents. The characters returned in the Betsy and Ghost arc which takes place before "Ghost Boy". It is also revealed that they are based on Susie's memories of her dad.	United States
Ghost Dad Cole	Summer Camp Island	July 7, 2018	Ghost the Boy, a ghost and Betsy's ex-boyfriend, has two dads as his parents. The characters returned in the Betsy and Ghost arc which takes place before "Ghost Boy". It is also revealed that they are based on Susie's memories of her dad.	United States
Yuzuki "Yuki" Giou (Sakurai)	The Betrayal Knows My Name	April 11, 2010	Yuzuki's previous incarnation was a woman named Yuki, who was in love with a man named Luka. In the present, Yuki, now in a male form, is highly protective of Luka, and vice versa, with both highly protective of each other, with implied romantic ties between them.	Japan
Gobber	DreamWorks Dragons	March 23, 2012	The blacksmith of Berk, Stoick's closest friend, and Hiccup's mentor. Later he is seen riding a Hotburple named Grump. He is also gay and appears in the films of the How to Train Your Dragon and DreamWorks Dragons: Rescue Riders.	United States
Ruka Gojou	Nanbaka	February 1, 2017	Ruka Gojou loves beauty and refers to himself as a "queen" while stating he is different from Kiji who he deems an "okama" and denies he is queer. He also seems to have some attraction towards men, as he blushed when Honey, a pretty boy, who complimented his looks in the episode "You are Weak."	Japan
Shun Hanamori	Kado: The Right Answer	April 7, 2017	He is Kojiro Shindo's coworker and roommate. He is clingy to Shindo and once has a conversation with Tsukai regarding her feelings for Shindo, during which he reveals his deep romantic feelings for Shindo but chooses to support Tsukai's feelings for Shindo.	Japan
Shun Hashimoto	L'etranger de la Plage	July 2013	Shun is explicitly mentioned to be gay in the book's summary, and the series delves into his struggles with his sexuality and relationships.	Japan
Hollyhock's fathers	BoJack Horseman	September 8, 2017	Hollyhock, a female teenage horse and Bojack's sister, has eight adoptive fathers (Dashawn Manheim, Steve Mannheim, Jose Guerrero, Cupe Robinson III, Otto Zilberschlag, Arturo "Ice Man" Fonzerelli, Gregory Hsung, and Quackers McQuack) in a polyamorous gay relationship.	United States
Hunter	Chozen	January 13, 2014	A fratboy who is in a relationship with rap star, Chozen.	United States
Enta Jinnai	Sarazanmai	April 11, 2019	Enta is in love with his best friend Kazuki, even sneaking a kiss with him while he naps, which is the first of his secrets to be revealed through the Sarazanmai sequence. In the potential future shown in the final episode, he asks Kazuki out but is rejected by him.	Japan
Joff	OK K.O.! Let's Be Heroes	August 1, 2017	The partner of Nick Army. He marries Nick Army in the show's final episode, "Thank You for Watching the Show".	United States
Ren Kaido	Super Lovers	April 6, 2016	Haru Kaido was formerly a player who dated numerous women, but eventually falls for his stepbrother Ren Kaido as shown in the episode "Forest Green." Ren himself has been in love with Haru since he was young and has shown no interest in women.	Japan
Herb Kazzaz	BoJack Horseman	August 22, 2014	Herb's closeted homosexuality was first hinted at by Charlotte's statement: "I don't think I'm the person Herb's looking for," a mere scene before Herb steals a kiss from BoJack in the episode "The Telescope". He was later removed from the show after it was revealed that he was indeed gay. Herb could possibly be bisexual, as he once dated Charlotte, although that could have been a cover to throw people off, or he was unsure of his sexuality.	United States
Shouta Kisa	The World's Greatest First Love	March 22, 2011	Shouta Kisa has a bad habit of falling for good looking men and falls for Kou, but is scared to pursue a relationship as he feels love doesn't really exist. Kou dated women in the past but later falls in love with Shouta and the two develop a strong romantic relationship.	Japan
Louis Kisaragi	King of Prism	January 9, 2016	Louis is in love with Shin Ichijo.	Japan
Knock Out	Transformers: Prime	March 11, 2011	Knock Out is a member of the Decepticons and acts as their medic. During BotCon 2011, it was suggested by the writers that Knock Out is gay, though they also argued that Cybertronians likely don't have designations for sexual orientation the way humans do, and the Decepticons follow a "don't ask, don't tell" policy.	United States
You Keika	Spiritpact	February 23, 2018	You is a fortune-teller and Tanmoku is an exorcist. You dies in an accident but is contacted by Tanmoku; they develop an alliance to fight evil spirits together, and their relationship eventually develops into something deeper.	China
Tanmoku Ki	Spiritpact	February 23, 2018	You is a fortune-teller and Tanmoku is an exorcist. You dies in an accident but is contacted by Tanmoku; they develop an alliance to fight evil spirits together, and their relationship eventually develops into something deeper.	China
Kid Flash	Young Justice	June 12, 2012	Kid Flash (Bart Allen) has been suggested to be gay by Greg Weisman, creator of the animated series. He is dating El Dorado (Ed Dorado Jr.), who was confirmed to be gay by Weisman.	United States
Moyuru Koda	Devilman Crybaby	January 5, 2018	Moyuru is a track athlete and a devilman; Junichi is his boyfriend. As they have sex, Moyuru turns into a demon and kills Junichi, much to his grief.	Japan
Junichi	Devilman Crybaby	January 5, 2018	Moyuru is a track athlete and a devilman; Junichi is his boyfriend. As they have sex, Moyuru turns into a demon and kills Junichi, much to his grief.	Japan
Kyle	She-Ra and the Princesses of Power	November 13, 2018	The partner of Rogelio, which was confirmed by showrunner ND Stevenson .	United States
Lance	She-Ra and the Princesses of Power	April 26, 2019	The partner of George and Dad of Bow, one of the series protagonists.	United States
Seung-Gil Lee	Yuri on Ice	November 23, 2016	In the official character information, as well as said by Kubo Mitsurou, Seung-Gil is described as not liking women even though he is a "handsome skater."	Japan
Howard and Harold McBride	The Loud House	July 20, 2016	Howard and Harold are the adoptive fathers of Clyde McBride, who is the best friend of protagonist Lincoln Loud. Howard and Harold are overprotective of their son and shower Clyde with attention. They are the first pair of married male characters to be depicted on a Nickelodeon series.	United States
Mack	Twelve Forever	July 29, 2019	Mack and Beefhouse are a couple in the fantasy world of Endless Island. They love each other, being bulky, to talk about their feelings and oolong tea. In Episode 7, "Mack and Beefhouse Forever," their relationship is tested after The Butt Witch tries to create friction between the two.	United States
Matthew MacDell	Big Mouth	September 29, 2017	Matthew is a flamboyantly gay student with a love of drama and spreading gossip. Aiden is Matthew's boyfriend introduced in the Valentine's Day special, "My Furry Valentine". In one episode, "Smooch or Share", he kissed Jay Bilzerian, one of the series protagonists, during a game.	United States
Makoto Mikasa	Fuuka	January 6, 2017	He is a handsome man who is openly homosexual.	Japan
Professor Muhly	Neo Yokio	September 22, 2017	Professor Muhly is a teacher at Easton Prep School who appears in the third episode "O, the Helenists...". He is shown to be gay and has a DJ boyfriend who does Gregorian chant remixes. Professor Muhly is voiced by gay composer and arranger Nico Muhly and his appearance is modeled after him.	Japan
Reo Niiboshi	Sarazanmai	April 11, 2019	This iconic duo of cops is at odds with each other, as they "act as enforcers for a capitalistic empire" and are forbidden to show their love for each other. Their sexuality is ambiguous to the world, but they are still very in love with each other, and they finally affirm their love later in the anime.	Japan
Mabu Akutsu	Sarazanmai	April 11, 2019	This iconic duo of cops is at odds with each other, as they "act as enforcers for a capitalistic empire" and are forbidden to show their love for each other. Their sexuality is ambiguous to the world, but they are still very in love with each other, and they finally affirm their love later in the anime.	Japan
Odval	Disenchantment	August 17, 2018	It is hinted that Odval and Sorcerio are secretly in a relationship in the Castle Party Massacre episode, as they secretly host a magic and sex cult when King Zøg is away. IndieWire reviewer Michael Schneider wrote that Sorcerio and Odval have been "a couple for a long time."	United States
Orka	Star Wars Resistance	October 7, 2018	Orka and Flix run the Office of Acquisitions on the Colossus, with Orka doing the negotiations. Justin Ridge, an executive producer for the show, said that it is safe to call them a couple, adding "They're absolutely a gay couple and we're proud of that" on the Coffee With Kenobi podcast.	United States
Patrick	Super Drags	November 9, 2018	A gay man working in a department store who is a drag queen superhero along with Donizete and Ralph.	Brazil
Paul	16 Hudson	August 21, 2018	Main character Luc is adopted by Paul and Bayani, making 16 Hudson the first preschool show to feature a main character with two dads.	Canada
Ralph	Super Drags	November 9, 2018	A gay man working in a department store who is a drag queen superhero along with Donizete and Patrick.	Brazil
Ray Razzle	Chip and Potato	November 29, 2019	A zebra family named the Razzles, Ray Razzle, his husband Roy Razzle, and their baby twins Ron and Ruby Razzle appeared in the episode "Chip's First Piano Exam".	United Kingdom
Roy Razzle	Chip and Potato	November 29, 2019	A zebra family named the Razzles, Ray Razzle, his husband Roy Razzle, and their baby twins Ron and Ruby Razzle appeared in the episode "Chip's First Piano Exam".	Canada
Rogelio	She-Ra and the Princesses of Power	November 13, 2018	Rogelio and Kyle are childhood friends who are part of Adora's team before she defected to the Rebellion. They later defected from the Horde, with Lonnie, at the end of Season 4. While show writers originally teased at their romantic relationship, with a locker even saying "R ❤ K" at the bottom, presumably Rogelo's locker, as shown in the episode "Moment of Truth", in the episode "Stranded", Scorpia tells Swift Wind that Kyle has a crush on Rogelio before cutting herself off. Showrunner ND Stevenson confirmed their relationship, adding that Lonnie is also part of it, implying a possible polyamorous relationship.	United States
Runaan	The Dragon Prince	November 22, 2019	In the third season it is revealed that Runaan, the leader of the assassins and father figure to Rayla, is married to a male elf named Ethari.	United States
Takashi 'Shiro' Shirogane	Voltron: Legendary Defender	June 10, 2016	Shiro and Adam were romantically involved before the start of the Kerberos mission, as shown in the episode "A Little Adventure" and others. However they broke up. Shiro went into space and several years later Adam dies fighting the Galra. However, the epilogue at the end of eighth and final season, shows Shiro being married to Curtis, a background character introduced in Season 7. The two shared an on-screen kiss in the episode "The End is the Beginning".	United States
Takato Saijo	Dakaretai Otoko 1-i ni Odosarete Imasu.	October 5, 2018	Takato, an experienced actor, loses the "World's Sexiest Man" title to a new, and rising actor, named Junta Azumaya, both in "the center of a scandal" in this anime, based on a yaoi manga series of the same name. Soon Junta confesses that he has strong romantic feelings for Takato and coerces him into a sexual relationship against Takato's will. Despite this, Takato finds himself moved by Junta's actions and persistence and has since established a genuine romantic relationship with him.	Japan
Juzo Sakakura	Danganronpa 3: The End of Hope's Peak High School	July 11, 2016	Juzo is the Future Foundation Branch Office 6 Director and the Former Ultimate Boxer. He is in love with the Future Foundation Vice-chairman, Kyousuke Munakata, and is also his right-hand man. His feelings get outed by Junko Enoshima, who blackmails him by threatening to let Kyousuke know about his love for him. He ends up lying to Kyousuke in order to protect his sexuality.	Japan
Masahiro Setagawa	Hitorijime My Hero	July 8, 2017	Masahiro Setagawa is rescued by Kousuke "Bear Killer" Ohshiba, while Kousuke saves Masahiro "from the thugs plaguing his life" and says he wants to protect him, while Kensuke meets his friend from childhood, Asaya Hasekura, who later kisses Kensuke and confesses his feelings, changing his feelings going forward.	Japan
Kousuke "Bear Killer" Ohshib	Hitorijime My Hero	July 8, 2017	Masahiro Setagawa is rescued by Kousuke "Bear Killer" Ohshiba, while Kousuke saves Masahiro "from the thugs plaguing his life" and says he wants to protect him, while Kensuke meets his friend from childhood, Asaya Hasekura, who later kisses Kensuke and confesses his feelings, changing his feelings going forward.	Japan
Asaya Hasekura	Hitorijime My Hero	July 8, 2017	Masahiro Setagawa is rescued by Kousuke "Bear Killer" Ohshiba, while Kousuke saves Masahiro "from the thugs plaguing his life" and says he wants to protect him, while Kensuke meets his friend from childhood, Asaya Hasekura, who later kisses Kensuke and confesses his feelings, changing his feelings going forward.	Japan
Kensuke	Hitorijime My Hero	July 8, 2017	Masahiro Setagawa is rescued by Kousuke "Bear Killer" Ohshiba, while Kousuke saves Masahiro "from the thugs plaguing his life" and says he wants to protect him, while Kensuke meets his friend from childhood, Asaya Hasekura, who later kisses Kensuke and confesses his feelings, changing his feelings going forward.	Japan
Nathan Seymour (Note: Also known as Fire Emblem)	Tiger & Bunny	May 8, 2011	Nathan is a highly effeminate homosexual man who identifies as genderqueer though they prefer to be identified as a woman at times, often spending more time with the female heroes while flirting with the male heroes.	Japan
Shion	No. 6	July 7, 2011	Nezumi breaks into the home of a privileged boy, Shion, and both explore the class divides in this society, later growing close and forming a romantic bond between the two of them.	Japan
Nezumi	No. 6	July 7, 2011	Nezumi breaks into the home of a privileged boy, Shion, and both explore the class divides in this society, later growing close and forming a romantic bond between the two of them.	Japan
Yūjirō Shiratori	The High School Life of a Fudanshi	August 17, 2016	Yūjirō is a gay effeminate crossdresser with a liking toward men, as indicated in episodes such as "Everyone's Fun Times," with strong "female power."	Japan
Harold Smiley	Steven Universe	November 18, 2013	Storyboard artist Raven Molisee confirmed that Mr. Smiley is gay because of his longtime relationship with another comedian Mr. Frowney. In the book, Steven Universe: Art & Origins, episode concepts for "Future Boy Zoltron" note that Mr. Smiley and Mr. Frowney are in a relationship.	United States
Sorcerio	Disenchantment	August 17, 2018	A long-time partner of Odval.	United States
Stolas	Helluva Boss	November 25, 2019	A royal demon in a sexual relationship with Blitzo. Official art posted for Pride Month in 2024 depicted him with the colors of the gay male pride flag.	United States
Seiji Takamori	Super Lovers	May 11, 2016	Seiji, better known as Kiyoka, runs a bar/cafe with his high school classmate, Haru, dresses in woman's clothes and appears to prefer men. He once confessed to Haru in the episode "Cloudy Sky," and been turned down. He also has transgender friends as shown in the episode "Marine Blue."	Japan
Kiyoka	Super Lovers	May 11, 2016	Seiji, better known as Kiyoka, runs a bar/cafe with his high school classmate, Haru, dresses in woman's clothes and appears to prefer men. He once confessed to Haru in the episode "Cloudy Sky," and been turned down. He also has transgender friends as shown in the episode "Marine Blue."	Japan
Masamune Takano	The World's Greatest First Love	March 12, 2011	Ritsu and Masamune dated in their high school years as indicated in the OVA ("No love's like to the first") but due to a misunderstanding broke up on bad terms, causing Ritsu to state he would never fall in love again. Ritsu dated other women in the past to forget but he later meets Masamune once more, with the two eventually rebuilding their relationship.	United States
Ray Terrill (Ray)	Freedom Fighters: The Ray	December 8, 2017	Ray, a gay superhero, and John go to a bar where Ray fails to ask a man on a date. As Ray struggles with his recent unemployment and avoids coming out to his conservative parents, the Ray from Earth-X emerges through a breach and hands the cortex off to his Earth-1 counterpart, along with his powers, before succumbing to his injuries. In Episode 3, John and Ray go back to the bar and Ray strikes up a conversation with the man, Jacob, in which later becomes his lover.	United States
John Trujillo (Black Condor)	Freedom Fighters: The Ray	December 8, 2017	Earth-X's Black Condor said to Ray that he likes men in episode 6 of season 2.	United States
Terry	Big City Greens	June 27, 2018	The partner of Alexander.	United States
Frodrick Toadstool	Amphibia	June 14, 2019	Toadie is the personal assistant of Frodrick Toadstool, the mayor of Wartwood Swamp. Their roles are reversed in the finale. Their sexuality was confirmed by series creator Matt Braly in a tweet.	United States
Toadie	Amphibia	June 14, 2019	Toadie is the personal assistant of Frodrick Toadstool, the mayor of Wartwood Swamp. Their roles are reversed in the finale. Their sexuality was confirmed by series creator Matt Braly in a tweet.	United States
Saika Totsuka	My Teen Romantic Comedy SNAFU	April 19, 2013	Saika is the president of the tennis club who has an androgynous appearance, but prefers others to not mistake his gender. He is one of the few people who truly wants to be closer friends with Hachiman, despite Hachiman's tendency to push others away. Furthermore, at the summer camp Saika is shown to have a crush on Hachiman, sometimes dreaming about him and mumbling Hachiman's name in his sleep. Despite knowing that Saika is a boy, Hachiman oftentimes finds himself unwillingly attracted to him.	Japan
Ritsuka Uenoyama	Given	July 11, 2019	Ritsuka and Mafuyu are bandmates. Ritsuka gets tired of playing music, but his love for Mafuyu is instrumental to get him to enjoy playing again.	Japan
Mafuyu Satō	Given	July 11, 2019	Ritsuka and Mafuyu are bandmates. Ritsuka gets tired of playing music, but his love for Mafuyu is instrumental to get him to enjoy playing again.	Japan
White Knight	Generator Rex	April 23, 2010	White Knight is the leader of Providence. During a Q&A at London Ontario Comic Con, series creator Duncan Rouleau confirmed that White Knight is gay and that he harbors romantic affection for Agent Six, his former combat partner and later chief subordinate. The subtext for it was always present but not vocalized due to Knight's internalized homophobia as an "uber white gay". He was willing to do anything for Six including turning on his own morals.	United States
Wyynde	Young Justice	July 9, 2019	Wyynde is an Atlantean and in a relationship with Kaldur'ahm, otherwise known as Aquaman. Wynnde and Aquaman share a kiss in the episode "Quiet Conversations". Greg Weisman, a producer of Young Justice, said that Kaldur'ahm has been in love with Wynnde and Tula, his childhood friend and crush, while dating Rocket, the last two of which are women.	United States
Wei Ying (Mo Xuanyu)	Mo Dao Zu Shi	July 9, 2018	Mo Xuanyu is an eccentric young man who faces ostracism from his family due to his homosexuality and the incestuous feelings he nurtures for his half-brother. Wei is the reincarnated spirit of a deceased aristocrat, who is reborn into the body of Mo after being summoned by him. He falls in love with Lan Zhan, who knew him since his previous life and loved him since then. This donghua plays down the physical dimension of the men's relationship due to censorship, but the manhua is more daring in this respect. However, the two men are portrayed as living as a couple, and even raising the child together, across media.	China
Lan Zhan	Mo Dao Zu Shi	July 9, 2018		China
Yūki Yoshida	Given	August 29, 2019	Yūki is the first boyfriend of Mafuyu Satō; he succumbs to suicide, causing Mafuyu's depression.	Japan
Yuri Katsuki	Yuri on Ice	May 26, 2017	Yuri and Victor have a gay relationship in which they eventually get engaged. Although it is not explicitly stated, Yuri and Victor exchange gold rings, kiss during the show and spend all their time together. At some points they are seen going on dates, sharing beds as well as providing emotional support. Victor and Yuri are also heavily individually queer coded. Victor truly loves Yuri and is very happy with him. Every time Victor sees Yuri he is always very enchanted with the ways Yuri moves. Even when they first met they fell in love. There is no doubt that they are truly in love with one another.	Japan
Victor Nikiforov	Yuri on Ice	May 26, 2017		Japan
Yukikaze	Demon Lord, Retry!	July 25, 2019	A B-rank adventurer who is accompanied with fellow adventurer Mikan. He is often been described as a "girlish boy" because of his feminine appearance, crossdressing as a girl in episodes such as "Yu Kirino." He is deeply infatuated with the Demon Lord Kunai after being saved twice by him.	Japan
Chiaki Yoshino	The World's Greatest First Love	May 7, 2011	Yoshiyuki has been friends with Chiaki for a long time and the two eventually start dating, as shown in the OVA, "The Case of Hatori Yoshiyuki." Hatori had a previous girlfriend in the past as shown in the episode "Delay in love is dangerous."	Japan

== In the 2020s ==
Characters	Show title	Character debut date	Notes	Country
Kiyoshi Adachi	Cherry Magic! Thirty Years of Virginity Can Make You a Wizard?!	January 11, 2024	In the seventh episode, Adachi begins dating Kurosawa. In the 11th episode, while on a work trip in Nagasaki, he writes a letter to Kurosawa admitting his romantic feelings. Later, they both talk about their feelings for one another in a Nagasaki hotel room. Adachi notes some of the things he likes about Kurosawa, and they kiss each other, then lie on the bed together, with implication they had sexual intercourse together.	Japan
Andrealphus	Helluva Boss	May 20, 2023	Andrealphus is a peacock-like demon and Stella's snobby brother who made his debut in the episode "Western Energy". Merchandise for the series shows Andrealphus in gay male pride colors.	United States
Fizzarolli	Helluva Boss	October 31, 2021	A jester in a romantic relationship with Asmodeus. Official art posted for Pride Month in 2024 depicted him with the colors of the gay male pride flag.	United States
Stolas	Helluva Boss	October 31, 2021	A prince of Hell, he is in a complicated relationship with Blitzo. Stolas has been interested in Blitzo since he was a child. It is also indicated Stolas never had an actual interest in women and only stay being married to Stella so he could give his daughter a normal and stable life. It was only until Octavia was old enough that Stolas could divorce his wife.	United States
Vassago	Helluva Boss	November 29, 2024	Vassago is a member of the Ars Goetia. Official art posted for Pride Month in 2024 depicted him with the colors of the gay male pride flag.	United States
Arnie Ambrose	Firebuds	September 23, 2022	Arnie and AJ Ambrose are the fathers of Axl. Arnie is voiced by gay actor Stephen Guarino.	United States
AJ Ambrose	Firebuds	September 23, 2022	Arnie and AJ Ambrose are the fathers of Axl. Arnie is voiced by gay actor Stephen Guarino.	United States
Aten	Ridley Jones	July 13, 2021	Aten and Kosi are Ismat's fathers. They are voiced by gay actor Andrew Rannells.	United States
Daddy Banana	Let's Go, Bananas!	April 19, 2024	Daddy and Papa Banana are an ape same-sex couple who have a daughter Apple, whom they raised together. The couple officially get married in the following episode "A Very Bananas Wedding". Daddy Banana is voiced by non-binary queer actor Kareem Vaude.	Canada
Papa Banana	Let's Go, Bananas!	April 19, 2024	In a romantic relationship with another Ape named Daddy, with a daughter Apple. In the episode "The Big Pop", Papa Banana initially wanted to proposed to Daddy Banana but the latter ends up being the one to propose to him. Papa Banana is voiced by gay actor Jonathan Tan.	Canada
Benji	Q-Force	September 2, 2021	He is a gay man who is the love interest of Mary and is often in danger due to his closeness to the Q-Force.	United States
King Barton Blueberry	Princess Power	January 30, 2023	King Barton Blueberry and Sir Benedict Blueberry are Beatrice "Bea" Blueberry's fathers. King Barton is voiced by gay actor Andrew Rannells and Sir Benedict is voiced by gay fashion designer and television personality Tan France.	United States
Sir Benedict Blueberry	Princess Power	January 30, 2023	King Barton Blueberry and Sir Benedict Blueberry are Beatrice "Bea" Blueberry's fathers. King Barton is voiced by gay actor Andrew Rannells and Sir Benedict is voiced by gay fashion designer and television personality Tan France.	Canada
Bowie	Total Drama	April 10, 2023	Bowie is a flamboyant Black Canadian teen who introduces himself as the first openly gay contestant for Total Drama Island. He eventually gets into a relationship with Raj and shared an onscreen kiss.	Canada
Sebastian Boyd (Makeup Boy)	The Proud Family: Louder and Prouder	February 23, 2022	Makeup Boy (real name Sebastian Boyd) is a flamboyant internet personality who gives out makeup tips. In the season 2 episode "BeBe", Makeup Boy is confirmed to be gay as he and Michael are shown to be dating. Makeup Boy is voiced by gay internet personality Bretman Rock.	United States
Brain	My Adventures with Superman	August 4, 2023	Brain and Monsieur Mallah are a couple similar to their depiction in the comics. It is the first time that they are openly depicted as a same-sex couple in animation.	United States
Isaac Calderon	Moon Girl and Devil Dinosaur	February 11, 2023	In the second episode "The Borough Bully", Casey Calderon is revealed to have two dads. In the episode "Today, I Am a Woman", Isaac and Antonio showed their wedding photo. It is the first Disney animated series to depict a same-sex wedding. They are voiced by gay actors Andy Cohen and Wilson Cruz.	United States
Antonio Calderon	Moon Girl and Devil Dinosaur	February 11, 2023	In the second episode "The Borough Bully", Casey Calderon is revealed to have two dads. In the episode "Today, I Am a Woman", Isaac and Antonio showed their wedding photo. It is the first Disney animated series to depict a same-sex wedding. They are voiced by gay actors Andy Cohen and Wilson Cruz.	United States
Hua Cheng	Heaven Official's Blessing	October 31, 2020	A demon ruler of the ghost realm who slowly develops feelings for Xie Lian and later they become a couple.	China
Fluffy Chiffon	Strawberry Shortcake: Berry in the Big City	November 21, 2021	Dad of Lime Chiffon with Lime Pops, and is a fashion designer as shown in the episodes "Bread's New BFF" and "The Fashion Show!".	Canada
Crispin Cienfuegos	The Great North	January 3, 2021	Crispin is a teen who works at a smoothie bar. Judy originally had a crush on him until "Pride & Prejudance Adventure" when it is revealed that Crispin is gay and is into Judy's brother Ham. He and Ham became a couple. Crispin was originally voiced by gay actor Julio Torres from season 1-season 3 episode 18 and is currently voiced by bisexual actor Juan Castrano.	United States
Michael Collins	The Proud Family: Louder and Prouder	February 23, 2022	Debuted in the original animated series, Michael acts all flamboyant, revealing to be gay and gender non-conforming. He is voiced by EJ Johnson, an openly gay television personality and Magic Johnson's son. In the season 2 episode "BeBe", he starts dating Makeup Boy.	United States
William Francis Clockwell	Invincible	March 26, 2021	Mark Grayson's best friend who has a crush on Mark's dad Omni-Man. He is voiced by gay actor Andrew Rannells. In the episode "You Look Kinda Dead", he visits Upstate University for the weekend to visit Rick Sheridan, his ex-boyfriend who turns into a cyborg called a "Reaniman" by young mad scientist D.A. Sinclair. His gay identity is established at the beginning of the series.	United States
Dad	Vida the Vet	October 20, 2023	Together with Papa, is a father of Vida.	Canada
Daniel	Chicago Party Aunt	September 17, 2021	Animated adaptation of the Twitter account of the same name. Daniel is Diane Dubrowski's nephew. He foregoes going to Stanford University and spends a "Gap Year" instead. He had just realized that he is gay. In the second part, Daniel gets a boyfriend. Daniel is voiced by gay actor Rory O'Malley.	United States
Dante	My Life is Worth Living	September 8, 2021	Dante is a high school football player. He also struggled to come out of the closet.	United States
Darnell	Lil Kev	March 6, 2025	In a same-sex relationship with Omar since both left prison, but Uncle Richard Jr. is unaware of them being a gay couple.	United States
Anthony "Angel Dust"	Hazbin Hotel	January 19, 2024 (Note: The pilot episode was released on October 28, 2019, but the series proper was released on January 19, 2024.)	Angel Dust is a pornstar, the first patient at the Happy Hotel, and engages in advances toward Alastor. Medrano confirmed him as gay and called him a "trashy unapologetically sexually open character." Angel Dust was voiced by asexual voice actor Michael Kovach in the pilot and bisexual actor Blake Roman in the series.	United States
Luis Felipe Jacinto	Carol & the End of the World	December 15, 2023	Luis is an employee in an accounting department, who is friends with co-workers Carol Kohl and Donna Shaw. Luis was in a relationship with a man he met named Wajto.	United States
Frank	Hailey's On It!	June 9, 2023	Frank is Hailey's pet flamingo. In the episode "Frankly Fabulous", Frank is revealed to be gay and is in love with Petey, a peacock. In real life, there have been reported cases of homosexual behavior in flamingos.	United States
Fry	Kid Cosmic	February 2, 2021	Fry is a man who works at Mo's Oasis Cafe and is usually seen together with Hamburg. He obtains the light pink elasticity Cosmic Stone of Power in the second season, which gives the user the ability to stretch his body. On February 3, 2022, the creator of Kid Cosmic, Craig McCracken, confirmed Fry and Hamburg as a gay couple.	United States
Hiromu Fujiyoshi	Welcome Home	April 9, 2024	Masaki Fujiyoshi is a stay-at-home husband, without any confidence, who is married to elite salaryman Hiromu. They have a two year old son named Hikari. Masaki struggles with his mental health, while his family, and that of Hiromu, are not pleased with their marriage, and work to overcome their parent's ibjections.	Japan
Masaki Fujiyoshi	Welcome Home	April 9, 2024	Masaki Fujiyoshi is a stay-at-home husband, without any confidence, who is married to elite salaryman Hiromu. They have a two year old son named Hikari. Masaki struggles with his mental health, while his family, and that of Hiromu, are not pleased with their marriage, and work to overcome their parent's ibjections.	Japan
Gary Garoldson	M.O.D.O.K.	May 21, 2021	Gary Garoldson is one of MODOK's employees who is very optimistic and loyal to the organization. He has a husband named Big Mike who works as a trucker, but his devotion to MODOK puts a strain on their marriage.	United States
Geoff	The Ghost and Molly McGee	October 2, 2021	Geoff is Scratch's ghost friend. He was his only friend before Molly and her family moved in. In the season two episode "The (After)life of the Party", Geoff is revealed to be gay and has been in a relationship with another ghost named Jeff for 100 years. Geoff's sexuality and his romantic relationship with Jeff had already been confirmed in the Chibi Tiny Tales short "Molly, Scratch's Third Wheel", in which they were shown with the other couples.	United States
Gideon	Chicago Party Aunt	September 17, 2021	Gideon is Diane's boss at Borough (formerly Chi City Sports Cuts and Clips). He has had failed relationships with men and his mother was unaware that he's gay until the episode "Halloweener Circle" when Diane outs him to his mother. Gideon is voiced by gay actor and drag queen RuPaul Charles.	United States
Isaac Goldberg-Calderon	Moon Girl and Devil Dinosaur	February 11, 2023	In the second episode "The Borough Bully", Casey is revealed to have two dads. In the episode "Today, I Am a Woman", Isaac and Antonio showed their wedding photo. It is the first Disney animated series to depict a same-sex wedding. They are voiced by gay actors Andy Cohen and Wilson Cruz.	United States
Antonio Goldberg-Calderon	Moon Girl and Devil Dinosaur	February 11, 2023	In the second episode "The Borough Bully", Casey is revealed to have two dads. In the episode "Today, I Am a Woman", Isaac and Antonio showed their wedding photo. It is the first Disney animated series to depict a same-sex wedding. They are voiced by gay actors Andy Cohen and Wilson Cruz.	United States
Greg	Bossy Bear	March 6, 2023	A father of Ginger along with Tyler. He runs a food truck with Tyler and is voiced by Michael Turchin, the husband of gay singer Lance Bass.	
Greymoon	Pinecone & Pony	April 8, 2022	Greymoon is the teacher for the Wiz Kids. He was confirmed to be gay by series writer Taneka Stotts. Greymoon is voiced by gay actor Thom Allison.	United States
Greymoon	Pinecone & Pony	April 8, 2022	Greymoon is the teacher for the Wiz Kids. He was confirmed to be gay by series writer Taneka Stotts. Greymoon is voiced by gay actor Thom Allison.	Canada
Barney Guttman	Dead End: Paranormal Park	June 16, 2022	In an interview on August 17, 2020, series creator Hamish Steele described Barney as a trans male character. He also hoped that the show will help out "more trans creators getting their chance to tell their stories" while hinting at other LGBTQ characters in the show apart from Barney. Barney is in a same-sex relationship with Logs, a health and safety worker at Dead End. Barney is voiced by trans actor Zach Barack.	United Kingdom
Hamburg	Kid Cosmic	February 2, 2021	Hamburg, a guy who works at Mo's Oasis Cafe and is usually seen with Fry. He obtains the indigo multiple arms Cosmic Stone of Power in the second season. On February 3, 2022, the creator of Kid Cosmic, Craig McCracken, that Fry was Hamburg's boyfriend.	United States
Holden	Crossing Swords	June 12, 2020	Pursues a relationship with Ruben throughout the show's second season.	United States
Hudson	Rocky & Hudson: Os Caubóis Gays	August 10, 2020	A gay cowboy in a couple with Rocky.	Brazil
Iago	Battle Kitty	April 19, 2022	Iago is one of the warriors at Battle Island and Orc's love interest. He seems receptive to Orc's feelings. Iago accepts his feelings and starts a relationship with Orc.	United States
Aresh Indolark	The Other World's Books Depend on the Bean Counter	January 6, 2026	A knight captain who assists Seiichirou Kondou after he experiences a tonic overdose, using a healing spell on him. However, this does not help heal his condition due to his lack of magic tolerance, with physical contact, and sexual activity, between them the only treatment for Seiichirou.	Japan
Jeff	The Ghost and Molly McGee	March 5, 2022	Jeff is a buff ghost. He is revealed to be Geoff's "Afterlife Partner" in the episode "The (After)life of the Party". Jeff is voiced by gay actor Vincent Rodriguez III.	United States
Jiu Jitsu Joe	Ada Twist, Scientist	April 23, 2023	Jiu Jitsu Joe gets married to Sensei Dave in the season four episode "Blue River Wedding". Jiu Jitsu Joe is voiced by gay actor Guillermo Díaz.	United States
Mr. K	Bea's Block	February 15, 2024	Father of Lexi along with Matt.	United States
Daichi Kikira	The Invisible Man and His Soon-to-Be Wife	January 8, 2026	Daichi Kikira, a blunt and unsociable human man, has a partner named Kousuke Madaraito. In the third episode, at first he isn't sure how to describe him, but later reveals that Kousuke is his partner to his co-workers. Kousuke, according to officials promotional materials, has been the partner of Daichi since high school.	Japan
Seiichirou Kondou	The Other World's Books Depend on the Bean Counter	January 6, 2026	To support his intense work ethic, Seiichirou begins a habit of drinking energizing tonics, not realizing that this could be dangerous to his health. One day, he experiences a tonic overdose, and the knight captain Aresh Indolark uses a healing spell on him. However, this worsens Seiichirou's condition because he lacks a tolerance for magic, and the only treatment is for Aresh and Seiichirou to engage in sexual activity and physical contact.	Japan
Kosi	Ridley Jones	July 13, 2021	One of the fathers of Ismat with Atenn and voiced by Chris Colfer.	United States
Yuichi Kurosawa	Cherry Magic! Thirty Years of Virginity Can Make You a Wizard?!	January 11, 2024	Kurosawa, a beautiful and well-liked man (in the office), has a crush on the protagonist Kiyoshi Adachi, who can hear the thoughts of those he touches. In the fifth episode, he confesses his love to Adachi. They later begin dating.	Japan
Lacklon	Dragon Age: Absolution	December 9, 2022	A dwarven fighter who enters a relationship with a warrior named Roland.	South Korea
Caius Lao Bistail	The Titan's Bride	July 6, 2020	He asks Kōichi Mizuki to marry him near the beginning of the series.	Japan
Dolph Laserhawk	Captain Laserhawk: A Blood Dragon Remix	October 19, 2023	Dolph Laserhawk is a supersoldier who was betrayed by his boyfriend and is sent to the Supermaxx. Dolph Laserhawk is voiced by queer actor Nathaniel Curtis.	France
Marshall Lee	Adventure Time: Fionna and Cake	August 31, 2023	In a same-sex relationship with Gary Prince. Marshall Lee is voiced by queer singer Kris Kollins in the second season, replacing Danny Glover who voiced the character in season one.	United States
Barry Leibowitz-Jenkins	The Proud Family: Louder and Prouder	February 23, 2022	Barry the detective and Randall the loaner are the interracial gay couple and the adoptive fathers of twins Maya and KG Leibowitz-Jenkins. They are voiced by openly gay actors Zachary Quinto and Billy Porter respectively.	United States
Randall Leibowitz-Jenkins	The Proud Family: Louder and Prouder	February 23, 2022	Barry the detective and Randall the loaner are the interracial gay couple and the adoptive fathers of twins Maya and KG Leibowitz-Jenkins. They are voiced by openly gay actors Zachary Quinto and Billy Porter respectively.	United States
Xie Lian	Heaven Official's Blessing	October 31, 2020	Xie is a prince who ascends to Heaven upon his death but is banished twice due to his rule-bending behavior. Upon returning a third time as a laughingstock, he meets Hua, a demon who rules the ghost realm and leads a war against Heaven but had been nurturing feelings for Xie for a long while. He flirts blatantly with a flustered Xie, and the two live together as a couple.	China
Dr. Lime Pops	Strawberry Shortcake: Berry in the Big City	November 21, 2021	Dr. Lime Pops and Fluffy Chiffon are Lime Chiffon's dads. They first appeared in the two-part Thanksgiving episode "Berry Bounty Banquet".	Canada
Magmaniac	Invincible	April 9, 2021	Magmaniac and Tether Tyrant are supervillains who worked as bodyguards for Machine Head. In the third season episode "You Want a Real Costume, Right?", they are revealed to be a same-sex couple.	United States
Monsieur Mallah	My Adventures with Superman	August 4, 2023	In a romantic relationship with Brain, with both wanting to live out a quiet life together.	United States
Steve Maryweather	Q-Force	September 2, 2021	Also known as Agency Mary, Steve was formerly part of the American Intelligence Agency (AIA) before he came out as gay. He was sent to West Hollywood where he could "disappear into obscurity," but while there he assembled his own team of LGBTQ spies, consisting of a drag disguise master (Twink), a skilled mechanic (Deb), and a hacker (Stat), later working with a straight man named Agent Buck at the request of the AIA. He is voiced by Sean Hayes, a gay actor and the creator of the series.	United States
Matt	Bea's Block	February 15, 2024	Father of Lexi along with Mr. K.	United States
Mbita	Baymax!	June 29, 2022	Mbita runs a fish truck despite developing an allergy to fish. He develops a romantic relationship with a man named Yukio. Mbita is voiced by gay comedian Jaboukie Young-White.	United States
Benson Mekler	Kipo and the Age of Wonderbeasts	January 14, 2020	In the episode, "Ratland," after Kipo tells Benson that she likes him, he says that he does like her but in a platonic way and says the reason is because he is gay. (Note: In the episode "Mulholland," Benson, after being lulled into a fantasy world by a water bug, dreams a party which features "cute boys" and emits rainbows from his mouth, along with practicing his DJ career with his friend Dave.) In the episode "Beyond the Valley of the Dogs", he develops a crush on one of the boys, Troy, who lives in the burrows. This is expanded in the show's second season, as in the episode "Paw of the Jaguar", Troy kisses Benson on the cheek, and in a later episode, "Heroes on Fire", a song about falling in love plays as they lock eyes, indicating he clearly has a crush on Troy.	United States
Mika	Lycoris Recoil	July 2, 2022	Mika is an Afro-Japanese man who is the manager at LyroReco. In the seventh episode "Time will tell", he is revealed to be gay with the main characters being aware of it. The ninth episode "What's done is done" shows he was in a relationship with a man named Shinji.	Japan
Yoshikazu Miyano	Sasaki and Miyano	January 10, 2022	Miyano Yoshikazu is a timid high school student who secretly enjoys reading boys' love (BL) manga. Curious and intrigued by his interests, an older student named Sasaki Shumei begins borrowing BL manga from him, leading to frequent conversations and a growing friendship.	Japan
Kōichi Mizuki	The Titan's Bride	July 6, 2020	High school basketball player Kōichi Mizuki is suddenly summoned to a world populated by giants. He is met by Caius Lao Vistaille, the prince of the world, who immediately asks Kōichi to marry him.	Japan
Mizrak	Castlevania: Nocturne	September 28, 2023	In a same-sex relationship with Olrox, a vampire of Aztec descent.	United States
Ranmaru Mori	Baban Baban Ban Vampire	January 11, 2025	A 450-year-old vampire who works part-time at an old public bath, desires the blood of an 18-year-old virgin, and watches over the growth of 15-year-old Rihito Tatsun, son of the bathhouse owners, and attempts to prevent Rihito from losing his virginity.	Japan
Logan "Logs" Nguyen	Dead End: Paranormal Park	June 16, 2022	Logs, a health and safety worker at Dead End, is in a same-sex relationship with Barney Guttman.. In the second season, it's revealed Logs' mother is unaware that he is gay.	United Kingdom
Nico's dads	Cocomelon Lane	November 17, 2023	Nico has two dads, who watch him dance in a tutu and tiara.	United States
Olrox	Castlevania: Nocturne	September 28, 2023	Olrox is a vampire of Aztec descent. He is in a same-sex relationship with a knight, Mizrak.	United States
Orc	Battle Kitty	April 19, 2022	Orc is Battle Kitty's best friend. In the episode "Warrior Park", Orc is revealed to be gay as he has a crush on Iago. Orc and Iago eventually become a couple.	United States
Omar	Lil Kev	March 6, 2025	In a romantic relationship with Darnell since both were in prison together.	United States
Hisashi Otomo	Twilight Out of Focus	July 4, 2024	Hisashi is asked to star in a BL production when he himself is gay, something which his roommate, Mao, only knows. Although he never approaches Mao romantically, he accidentally mistakes Mao for his boyfriend, at one point, which he apologizes for the next day.	Japan
Papa	Vida the Vet	October 20, 2023	Papa and Dad are the fathers of Vida.	Canada
Gilbert Park	The Owl House	August 1, 2020	In the episode "Understanding Willow" it is shown that Willow Park has two dads, one named Gilbert wearing glasses and the other named Harvey with a beard, seen in a flashback, playing on a swing set. This was confirmed by a story artist for the show, Cat Mitchell. In the episode "Escaping Expulsion" it is shown that Harvey Park is dark skinned, probably overly protective, and has high expectations for her. Gilbert Park is lighter skinned, is more easy going, and aware of her adventurous outings. In the episode "Any Sport in a Storm", they were shown to be members of the Flying Derby team when they were around Willow's age. They are named after gay rights activists Gilbert Baker and Harvey Milk.	United States
Harvey Park	The Owl House	August 1, 2020		United States
Gary Prince	Adventure Time: Fionna and Cake	August 31, 2023	The gender-flipped counterparts of Marceline and Princess Bubblegum who are in a same-sex relationship. Gary Prince is voiced by gay actor Andrew Rannells in the first season and queer actor Harvey Guillén in the second season.	United States
Jonny Quest	Jellystone!	July 29, 2021	Based on the Hanna-Barbera characters, the two of them are featured grown up and a married couple and run the town's bowling alley, confirmed by writer Melody Iza in July 2021. The season 2 episode "The Sea Monster of Jellystone Cove" takes a look at their relationship.	United States
Renaldo Raccoon	Tiny Toons Looniversity	September 8, 2023	Renaldo is a student at ACME Looniversity. He is a flamboyant and openly gay raccoon. Renaldo is voiced by gay actor Tony Rodriguez.	United States
Raj	Total Drama	April 10, 2023	Raj is an Indian Canadian teen who is into hockey. He falls in love with Bowie and the latter helps him to get out of the closet.	Canada
Rocky	Rocky & Hudson: Os Caubóis Gays	August 10, 2020	Rocky and Hudson are a gay cowboy couple. They are named after gay actor Rock Hudson.	Brazil
Roland	Dragon Age: Absolution	December 9, 2022	Roland is a warrior and Miriam's ally. He also gets into a relationship with dwarven fighter Lacklon.	South Korea
Ruben	Crossing Swords	June 12, 2020	Ruben is one of Patrick's brothers. In the first-season episode "The A-Moooo-Zing Race", he is revealed to be gay. Throughout the second season, he pursues a relationship with Holden.	United States
Indy Sabrewing	DuckTales	April 4, 2020	Debuted in the season 3 episode "Challenge of the Senior Junior Woodchucks!" Indy and Ty are the guardians of Violet Sabrewing and the foster fathers of Lena De Spell. The characters have no speaking lines.	United States
Ty Sabrewing	DuckTales	April 4, 2020	Debuted in the season 3 episode "Challenge of the Senior Junior Woodchucks!" Indy and Ty are the guardians of Violet Sabrewing and the foster fathers of Lena De Spell. The characters have no speaking lines.	United States
Troy Sandoval	Kipo and the Age of Wonderbeasts	January 14, 2020	He kisses Benson, a boy who has a crush on him, and both later begin a relationship.	United States
Shūmei Sasaki	Sasaki and Miyano	January 10, 2022	As they spend more time together, Sasaki develops romantic feelings for Miyano, while Miyano begins to question his own emotions and understandings of love.	Japan
Scott	Hoops	August 21, 2020	Scott is a gay boy on the school basketball team, who had been "the Colts' best player" before Matty came around.	United States
Scott	My Life is Worth Living	September 1, 2021	Scott is a public speaker. He is revealed to be gay in Dante's Story.	United States
Sensei Dave	Ada Twist, Scientist	January 25, 2022	Sensei Dave gets married to Jiu Jitsu Joe in the season four episode "Blue River Wedding". Sensei Dave is voiced by gay actor George Takei.	United States
Rick Sheridan	Invincible	April 15, 2021	Rick is William Clockwell's boyfriend who was turned into a Reaniman by D.A. Sinclair. Rick is voiced by gay actors Jonathan Groff in the first season and Luke Macfarlane in the second season.	United States
Hadji Singh	Jellystone!	July 29, 2021	Is a married couple with Jonny Quest.	United States
Snagglepuss	Jellystone!	July 29, 2021	Snagglepuss was confirmed to be gay by writer Melody Iza.	United States
Alex Taylor	Captain Laserhawk: A Blood Dragon Remix	October 19, 2023	Alex Taylor is Dolph's ex-boyfriend. He becomes one of Dolph's enemies.	France
Ham Tobin	The Great North	January 3, 2021	Ham is a teen trying to find his place in the world and comes out to his family as gay, even though he did so in the past. He then went on to date a teen name Crispin, who was originally his sister Judy's love interest.	United States
Masato Tsuge	Cherry Magic! Thirty Years of Virginity Can Make You a Wizard?!	January 11, 2024	In the 11th episode, he confesses his love for a part-time deliveryman and dancer named Minato, while Minato reciprocates these feelings, with both hugging one another.	Japan
Twink	Q-Force	September 2, 2021	Twink is a gay French Canadian who is a "Master of drag" and part of the Q-Force. Twink is voiced by gay comedian Matt Rogers.	United States
Tyler	Bossy Bear	March 6, 2023	Tyler and Greg are the fathers of Ginger. They both run a food truck. Tyler and Greg are voiced by gay singer Lance Bass and his real-life husband Michael Turchin.	United States
Tether Tyrant	Invincible	April 9, 2021	A supervillian who is inn a romantic relationship with Magmaniac.	United States
Minato Wataya	Cherry Magic! Thirty Years of Virginity Can Make You a Wizard?!	January 11, 2024	Falls in love with Masato Tsuge, and both enter a relationship.	Japan
Wallace Wells	Scott Pilgrim Takes Off	November 17, 2023	Wallace Wells is Scott's gay roommate. He was in a romantic relationship with Todd Ingram on the movie set.	United States
Mildew Wolf	Jellystone!	July 29, 2021	In the episode "Grocery Store", Mildew Wolf is shown flirting with his co-worker Shazzan. His original voice actor, Paul Lynde, who voiced him in the Cattanooga Cats segment It's the Wolf!, was gay.	United States
Mr. X	Amphibia	November 6, 2021	Mr. X is a highly effeminate and enigmatic FBI agent. In the episode "All In", when Mr. X was searching his contact list on his phone, one of them says "hubby" implying that he is married and has a husband. Mr. X is voiced by gay actor and drag queen RuPaul.	United States
Yashiro	Twittering Birds Never Fly	February 15, 2020	Yashiro, a masochist and yakuza boss warms up to his new bodyguard, Chikara Doumeki. As his entreaties fail, he discovers why his bodyguard only wants to stay at "arm's length" to himself, rather than get involved in a relationship. An anime film with these characters was released on February 15, 2020, titled Twittering Birds Never Fly – The Clouds Gather while an OAD will be released on March 1, 2021, titled Twittering Birds Never Fly – Don't Stay Gold, along with two upcoming films, one of which is titled Twittering Birds Never Fly – The Storm Breaks.	Japan
Shion Yoshino	Twilight Out of Focus	August 22, 2024	Unlike Otomo, Yoshino has friends who supports him when he first declares his sexuality, when he announces it to the entire film club. Prior to this point, he is determined to find the "best" boyfriend for himself.	Japan
Yukio	Baymax!	June 29, 2022	Develops a romantic relationship with Mbita over the course of the series.	United States

== See also ==
- Gay village
- Gay bashing
- List of animated films with LGBT characters
- LGBT themes in comics
- List of animated series with LGBTQ characters
- List of polyamorous characters in fiction
- List of LGBT-themed speculative fiction
- List of LGBT characters in soap operas
- List of LGBT-related films
- Lists of LGBT figures in fiction and myth
- LGBTQ themes in Western animation
- LGBTQ themes in anime and manga
