= Legend of DUO =

Japanese anime television series

Legend of DUO (or Legends of the duo) is a Television Saitama program, which had been broadcast in AT-X and anime heaven.

The airtime of the show was 5 min. per episode, lasting for 12 episodes in total. The series is about an hour long.

== Characters ==
1. Duo (voice: Nakamoto Sunao)
2. Zeig (voice: Tomokazu Sugita)
3. Stefan (voice: Amano Yu)
4. Lizzie (voice: Haruhisa Okumura)

== Title ==
1. 渇血
2. 大罪 Deadly
3. 宿業宿業
4. 銃口 Muzzle
5. 回顧 Retrospective
6. 遙命遙命
7. 偽愛 Fake Love
8. 蜜月 Honeymoon
9. 致命 Fatal
10. 血宴 Blood Feast
11. 執念 Tenacity
12. 親愛 Dear

== Releases ==
Aired from April 21, 2005 to June 27, 2005

== Reception ==
Stig Høgset of THEM Anime Reviews criticized the show as "badly animated," even worse than Crying Freeman, saying that "the art is consistently good" and that the writing is good, including a homosexual flashback involving Zieg. He called the series "hilarious" and called the acting "souless," saying that he recommends watching it once because the "laughs you'll get out of it is definitely worth it."

== See also ==
- UHF anime
