= Bea's Block =

American animated television series

- Genre: Children's television series
- Based on: The original shorts produced in association with A Productions
- Voices of: Everly Carganilla; Zai Stevens; Lena Josephine Marano; Ryan Chan Kuperman; Griffin Faulkner; Royina Patel; Dave Droxler
- Theme music composer: YolanDa Brown
- Opening theme: "Bea's Block"
- Ending theme: "Bea's Block" (instrumental)
- Composer: YolanDa Brown
- Countries of origin: United States; United Kingdom
- Original language: English
- No. of seasons: 1
- No. of episodes: 20

Production
- Running time: 11 minutes
- Production company: Sesame Workshop

Original release
- Network: Sky Kids (United Kingdom); HBO Max (United States)
- Release: August 21, 2023 – 2024

Bea's Block is an animated television series produced by Sesame Workshop and animated by UK-based animation studio, A Productions. It is based on the short-form series, "Totems" also animated by A Productions and produced by Sesame Workshop.

It debuted on August 21, 2023. In the United States, the series debuted on Max on February 15, 2024. It was removed two years later on March 7, 2026.

== Premise ==
In a town inhabited by various humanoid wooden blocks, Bea and her friends work together to spread kindness to their whole community of block neighbors. There is no problem that Bea and her friends cannot solve with positivity and collaboration.

== Characters ==
- Bea (voiced by Everly Carganilla) is a Hispanic American girl who is the head of the Kindness Club and helps bring kindness to her neighborhood
- Bruno (voiced by Dave Droxler) is Bea's red dog with yellow spots on his body
- Ty (voiced by Zai Stevens) is an African American boy, who is one of Bea's best friends and member of the Kindness Club
- Lexi (voiced by Lena Josephine Marano) is a Caucasian girl who one of Bea's best friends and member of the Kindness Club
- Priya (voiced by Royina Patel) is an Indian-American girl first introduced in the episode, New Kid on the Block.
- Ricky (voiced by TBA) is Bea's little brother
- Danny (voiced by TBA) is a caucasian boy who uses a wheelchair to get around.

== Episodes ==
No. overall	No. in series	Title	Original release date
1	1	Lexi's Parrot	21 August 2023
1	1	Ricky's Book	21 August 2023
Lexi is upset that her new parrot, Mr. Talky doesn't actually talk/Bea forgets to bring home Ricky favorite Blockysaur book, so she and her friends make him a new story.
2	2	Sam's Campout	28 August 2023
2	2	Best Square Chef	28 August 2023
Sam is excited to start his first backyard campout/Ty and Lexi argue over what tasty toppings should be on a pizza
3	3	New Kid on the Block	28 August 2023
3	3	Danny Sings	28 August 2023
The Kindness Club is so excited to meet a new neighbor, Priya/A nervous Danny tries to sing his favorite song for music week
4	4	Ty's Superhero	28 September 2023
4	4	Class Pet	28 September 2023
Megan hurts Ty's feelings when she says that she can't be his favorite superhero character/Priya is upset because she is unable to bring home the class hamster.
5	5	Welcome to Bollywood	28 September 2023
5	5	Playground Park-itects	28 September 2023
Priya gets frustrated while teaching Bea and Ty how to do a Bollywood dance/Bea and Ty are invited to City Hall to help with a project.
6	6	Blocketball Hero	5 October 2023
6	6	Bea and the Chameleon	5 October 2023
7	7	Game Time	9 October 2023
7	7	Babysitting Ricky	9 October 2023
8	8	Danny's Unicorn	9 October 2023
8	8	Bea's Sick Day	9 October 2023
9	9	Science Fair Meltdown	9 October 2023
9	9	Sam and Mei	9 October 2023
10	10	Faster than Frank	10 October 2023
10	10	Bea and the Chef's Hat	10 October 2023
11	11	Goodbye Superzoom	13 October 2023
11	11	Astro Bea	13 October 2023
12	12	This is Me	16 October 2023
12	12	Sleepover and Monsters	16 October 2023
13	13	Busy Bea	17 October 2023
13	13	Sharing is Caring	17 October 2023
14	14	Bea-T Goes On	2 November 2023
14	14	Lexi and the Fireflies	2 November 2023
15	15	Sam's Awesome Show	9 November 2023
15	15	Mini Golf Misses	9 November 2023
16	16	Backyard Block Games	2024
16	16	Birthday Bea	2024
17	17	Sam Goes To Dinner	2024
17	17	Treasure Hunt	2024
18	18	El Ratoncito and the Tooth Fairy	2024
18	18	Lexi Tries Gymnastics	2024
19	19	Danny Learns Mandarin	2024
19	19	The Backyard Talent Show	2024
20	20	Sam's Moon Festival	2024
20	20	You're the Best, Mr. K	2024
