= History IQ =

- Genre: Quiz; History
- Created by: Dana Calderwood; Michael Klinghoffer
- Presented by: Marc Summers
- Narrated by: Harvey
- Composer: Edd Kalehoff
- Country of origin: United States
- Original language: English
- No. of seasons: 2
- No. of episodes: 110

Production
- Running time: 30 minutes
- Production companies: Glow in the Dark Productions; Spiderdance

Original release
- Network: History Channel
- Release: October 2, 2000 – June 22, 2001

History IQ is a game show on the History Channel which premiered on October 2, 2000 and aired for two seasons. Marc Summers hosted and Harvey announced, reuniting the two from the Nickelodeon game show Double Dare. History IQ was produced by Glow in the Dark Productions.

During each episode, three contestants participated in a process of elimination game. Season one's daily grand prize was $25,000. The daily grand prize was lowered to $5,000 in season two, but contestants also played for a spot to advance in a tournament for a top prize of $250,000.

During the show's original run, home viewers could play along with the game online at the History IQ website. Shortly after the last original episode aired, reruns began airing at 6:00 a.m. E/T on Saturday mornings, and continued until June 27, 2009.

== Gameplay ==
=== Eye Q ===
A toss-up question was posed to the contestants after a brief historical video clip. The first contestant to buzz-in and correctly answer the question earned $100 and control of the game. That contestant was allowed to answer questions related to the toss-up with each correct answer worth an additional $50. If the contestant answered incorrectly or ran out of time to answer, the other contestants could buzz-in and earn $50 and control of the game. If the opponents were unable to give a correct answer, the round continued with another toss-up question asked to all three players for $50. Questions about the clip were asked until time was called. The player with the lowest score after time was called (four video clips) was eliminated from the game.

If a tie occurred between two contestants for last place, or if all three contestants tied for first place after time was called, one final toss-up question was given. The first person to buzz in with the correct answer advanced to the next round, and the other contestant was eliminated. An incorrect answer on that question resulted in elimination.

=== Tri Q ===
In the Tri Q round, the two remaining contestants were presented with a list of three people or items, followed by a question from Summers. The contestants needed to determine which of the people or items pertained to the question. Correct answers earned $200 and control of a follow-up question. The player in control could either answer the follow-up or pass it to the opponent. A correct answer earned $100, but incorrect answers lost the value of the question.

The final Tri Q question in the round was the "Speed Challenge". Summers presented another list of three names or items, but instead of a regular Tri Q question, Summers gave the contestants a clue. The contestants had to buzz-in and identify which item from the list matched the clue. The round lasted for 45 seconds and each answer was worth +/- $100. The contestant with the most money at the end of the round kept their money and moved onto the final round.

If a tie occurred, one final clue was given. If the player answered correctly, he/she moved on. If incorrect, his/her opponent moved on.

=== History IQ Timeline ===
Before the round began, the winning contestant was given a list of ten news headlines, one for each year in a ten-year span (e.g., 1914 to 1923). The contestant then had 60 seconds to match the ten headlines to their corresponding years, and could do so in any order. At any time—even before all ten headlines were placed—the contestant could check his or her progress using one of five "hot buttons," which gave the contestant the number of correctly placed headlines, but not the specific headlines that were correctly placed. Placed headlines could be moved to a different year until time expired.

The player won $500 for each correct placement. Ten correct placements won the grand prize of $25,000.

=== Season two changes ===
In the first Eye Q round, contestants were presented with a toss-up question consisting of a headline and three related facts, one of which was incorrect. The contestants buzzed in and chose what they believed was the incorrect fact. Successfully doing so won $100, but incorrect guesses lost $100. The contestant who answered correctly was then asked a follow-up question related to the toss-up worth +/- $50. As in season one, the player with the lowest score after time was called was eliminated from the game.

In the bonus round, contestants were presented with ten headlines as in season one. During the 60 seconds, the contestant was presented with one headline at a time at the top of the screen, and had to match the headline to the correct year. If correct, that headline would lock into place and the next headline would appear; if not, the same headline would appear. Contestants could then try again, or pass and move on to the next headline; the headline would be automatically passed if it was placed incorrectly three times in a row. Correctly placing all ten headlines won the player $5,000.

Contestants who made it to the bonus round in season two later returned to compete in a tournament with a top prize of $250,000. The tournament was won by attorney Robin Grover over Jeopardy! Tournament of Champions winner Leszek Pawlowicz, and his winning episode aired as the series finale on June 22, 2001.

== Trivia ==
In addition to Summers and Harvey, other fellow Double Dare alumni that worked on History IQ included creators/executive producers Dana Calderwood and Michael Klinghoffer (the former of which also served as director) as well as music composer Edd Kalehoff and set designer Jim Fenhagen.
