= Mystery Magical Special =

Television series

Mystery Magical Special (also known on screen as Marc Summers' Mystery Magical Tour) is an American television special aired on Nickelodeon. Advertised as a Halloween-themed program, the special was originally produced in 1988, but continued to air, often multiple times, every October for several years afterward, ceasing after 1996.

Primarily, the special was designed to show off the talents of stage magicians Lance Burton and Tina Lenert, as well as capitalize on Marc Summers' then-newfound popularity as the host of the game show Double Dare. Actors Shiri Appleby, Jonathan Brandis and Trenton Teigen also appear, with Addams Family star John Astin making a cameo appearance. Filming took place at The Magic Castle in Los Angeles, California.
