= Edd Kalehoff =

American television music composer (born 1945)

- Born: Edward Woodley Kalehoff Jr. September 1, 1945 (age 81); Washington, D.C., U.S.
- Genre: Television
- Occupation: Composer
- Instrument: Synthesizer
- Spouses: Beverly Kalehoff (divorced); Andrea McArdle (m. 1988; div. 2011)
- Website: www.eddkalehoff.com

Edward Woodley Kalehoff Jr. (born September 1, 1945) is an American composer who specializes in music for television, known for his work on the Moog synthesizer. Kalehoff is best known for composing the musical packages for game shows, most notably the Goodson Todman produced shows The Price Is Right, Tattletales, Card Sharks and the Nickelodeon game show Double Dare, as well as for ABC World News Tonight, Monday Night Football, Nightly Business Report, and PBS News Hour.

== Early life ==
Kalehoff was born in Washington, D.C. His father, Edward Woodley "Woody" Kalehoff Sr., played piano at the White House for president Harry S. Truman. He attended the University of the Arts (then known as the Philadelphia Musical Academy), graduating in 1967 with a Bachelor of Music degree.

== Career ==
=== Notable pieces ===
Kalehoff composed many television themes and musical cues using the Moog synthesizer, alone or in combination with a band of musicians. He composed The Price Is Right main theme, and the theme for the Nickelodeon game show Double Dare. He wrote a music package for ESPN on ABC that updated and expanded the Monday Night Football theme; the 1991 theme song for Labatt Blue Jays/Expos Baseball on TSN in Canada; music for WNBC's famous 1992 promotional campaign "We're 4 New York"; and many news program music and television station image packages used on stations such as WEWS-TV in Cleveland, WJBK in Detroit, and WNYW, WCBS-TV and WNBC in New York City. The NBC Stations package composed in 1995 for WNBC was used by the station until 2003; during that time, the package would also be used by two other NBC affiliates in the state of New York (WNYT in the Albany/Schenectady/Troy market and WSTM-TV in the Syracuse market). Due to its long run as the music package for both WNBC and WNYT, it is widely known in the New York tri-state area. His most recent work is the new theme for the PBS NewsHour as part of a new on-air look launched on July 20, 2015.

The main theme of The Price Is Right is officially credited to Sheila Cole, even though it was composed and performed by Kalehoff. At the time, Kalehoff was working for Score Productions, under composer Bob Israel. Israel assigned the theme's Broadcast Music, Inc. publishing rights to Mark Goodson, the producer of The Price Is Right, so that Goodson would benefit monetarily. Israel assigned the composer credit to Sheila Cole Israel, his wife, explaining this fiction to Kalehoff as a "technicality." Israel assured Kalehoff that there would be future work with Goodson. This arrangement diverted millions of dollars of residual away from Kalehoff. Kalehoff was named as composer in the closing credits of the television show but he did not appear on the official BMI credits for the song.

=== As a keyboard player and record producer ===
Kalehoff is a noted synthesist, being a featured performer in the documentary film Moog and keyboardist for several albums by the Roches. He was prominently featured in a 1973 television commercial for Schaefer Beer as "Edd Kalehoff at the MOOG synthesizer" playing his rendition of the company's jingle.

As a record producer, he produced several albums including Another World (1985) for the Roches, and Andrea McArdle's On Broadway (1996) and Family Christmas (2003).

== Personal life ==
Kalehoff was married to Broadway theatre actress and singer Andrea McArdle, and their daughter, actress Alexis Kalehoff, has appeared in many Broadway theatre productions. The couple divorced in August 2011. Kalehoff has two sons, Max and Rex, from his first marriage to songwriter Beverly Kalehoff.

== Selected filmography ==
- Monday Night Football
- ABC Sports (1993 closing sequence)
- ABC World News Tonight (1996-2012, 2020-present)
- Wide World of Sports
- Nightly Business Report
- I've Got A Secret (1972)
- The Price Is Right, including all the show cues and the updated The New Price Is Right theme in 1994
- Concentration (1973)
- Tattletales (1974)
- The Big Showdown (1974) for Don Lipp-Ron Greenburg Productions
- Double Dare/Card Sharks (Same piece used on two shows. A different Kalehoff composition was used for the 1986–1989 version of Card Sharks.)
- Match Game-Hollywood Squares Hour (currently used as a prize/car cue on The Price Is Right)
- Family Feud (1994 US and 2020 Family Feud Africa, three cues of which are used as car/showcase prize cues on The Price Is Right (1972 and 1994 versions), as well as the intro to Grand Game)
- Trivia Trap
- Nick Rocks
- Double Dare (Nickelodeon version, 1986–1993, 2018–2019)
- Finders Keepers
- Think Fast
- Make the Grade
- History IQ
- The View
- Judge Mills Lane (1998–2001)
- PBS NewsHour (new theme music introduced in 2015)
- other projects for Mark Goodson Productions
- Turner Sports (introductory music, known as Victory Road, used before telecasts, as well as theme for individual sports)

== News music packages composed by Edd Kalehoff ==
- Dayna (WJBK)
- Eyewitness Primetime (WJBK, after switch to Fox)
- Good Day (WNYW, Good Day New York)
- Grandeur (WCBS-TV; now used as a showcase cue on The Price Is Right)
- Groove News (KNSD)
- Industrial Strength (WTTG)
- Major Theme (WJBK)
- NBC Stations (WNBC)
- Nightcast (WCBS)
- Straight Talk (WJBK)
- Today's 4 (WBZ-TV)
- We're 4 New York (WNBC package/campaign)
- Live on 5 (WEWS-TV)
- Evening News (WJBK)
- CNBC Music Package 2000-2003
