= Pick Your Brain =

- Genre: Game show
- Created by: Marc Summers
- Directed by: Richard S. Kline
- Presented by: Marc Summers
- Announcer: Greg Berg
- Country of origin: United States
- No. of seasons: 1

Production
- Producers: Marc Summers; Michael J. Freeman PhD; 2XL Licensor
- Running time: 30 Minutes
- Production companies: Marc Summers Productions; The Summit Media Group

Original release
- Network: Syndication
- Release: September 18, 1993 – May 21, 1994

Pick Your Brain is an American syndicated game show that featured children as contestants. The series ran on weekends for one year, debuting on September 18, 1993, and running until May 21, 1994. Pick Your Brain was created by Marc Summers, who also served as its host and executive producer. He was assisted by a giant robot named 2-XL, based on the Tiger Electronics toy of the same name and voiced by Greg Berg.

Pick Your Brain was produced by Marc Summers Productions and The Summit Media Group, and was distributed by Rysher TPE.

== Gameplay ==
Three children competed in a three-round game.

=== Round one ===
Round one was a memory-based quiz round. To start, 2-XL gave the children a choice of two characters at the beginning of the round. The children would then vote secretly as to which one they wanted to see. After the children made their selection a short film was shown to them, with Summers either playing the character in question or someone else telling a story about the character. After the film was shown Summers asked a series of seven toss-up questions about it. To answer, a player pushed a brain-shaped buzzer and the first to buzz in got to try the question; players could not buzz in until Summers read the entire question. Only one answer was allowed per question, and any child who gave a correct answer earned 25 points, for a maximum of 175 points if a player got all 7 correct. If someone failed to answer correctly/at all or none of the three children buzzed in, 2-XL would give the answer himself.

At the end of the first round 2-XL asked a question to the home viewers and revealed the answer before the beginning of the second round.

=== Round two ===
In the second round all three players were joined on stage by an adult companion, who would assist them in playing. For this round 2-XL displayed three games in his window and shuffled them randomly. In order to choose a game the child had to hit one of three buttons below the window and played whatever game was displayed. Each game was conducted the same way- all three were worth a maximum of 250 points and the objectives were always to complete as many of five parts as possible.

The combined maximum point total a player could win was 425 (175 points in round one and 250 points in round two).

The same three games were always featured:

- Phys-Quiz: The two players participated in a physical stunt lasting 60 seconds.
- 2 by 2: One of the players was given a subject, then given a choice of two subcategories for their partner to answer questions from.
- XL's Extra: The team that picked this was given a chance to win a bonus prize if they gave five answers to a question from a chosen subject. The players alternated giving answers, and the round ended if they got all five, took more than three seconds to answer, gave an incorrect answer, or repeated an answer.

=== Round three ===
This final round was played as a straight general knowledge quiz. This time, the children raced to light up five brains displayed in a line atop their podium. The first and second place players were given a head start while third place didn't get a headstart, with the leader receiving two free brains (and must give three correct answers) and the second place player get one (and must give four correct answers) while third place has no free brains (and must give five correct answers). If any of the scores were tied the children received the same amount of brains, corresponding with their place. As in the first round, Summers would read toss-up questions and the players would buzz in to answer. Unlike in the first round, players could interrupt the question, and if a player gave an incorrect answer, the other two could then buzz in and try to answer correctly. The first player to light up all five brains won the game, a $5,000 savings bond for their education (provided by Toys "R" Us), and advanced to the bonus round.

At the end of this round the children were each given a sweatshirt with the name/logo of a college or university they wished to attend when they got older.

=== Bonus round ===
The winning child was rejoined by their adult partner to play this round. 2-XL would display two prizes in his window and shuffle them around randomly. The child was given up to three tries to try and match one of them. One of the prizes was a trip of some sort, while the other was a smaller prize or $1,000. In order to pick a prize the child would hit one of 2-XL's four buttons, which locked the choice and place and couldn't be pressed again once it was hit. Whichever prize the child matched was the one they won.
