= Marc Summers =

American television personality (born 1951)

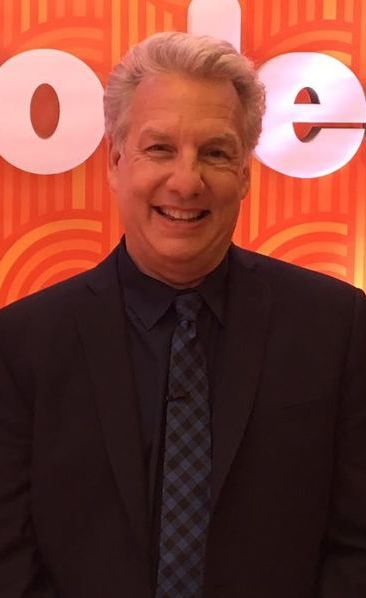
- Summers in 2016
- Born: Marc Berkowitz; November 11, 1951 (age 74); Indianapolis, Indiana, U.S.
- Occupations: Television personality; television host; producer; comedian
- Years active: 1972–present
- Notable credit(s): Double Dare (Nickelodeon); What Would You Do? (Nickelodeon); Pick Your Brain (syndication); History IQ (History); WinTuition (Game Show Network); Unwrapped (Food Network); The Next Food Network Star (Food Network); Dinner: Impossible (Food Network) (executive producer); Restaurant: Impossible (Food Network) (executive producer)
- Spouse: Alice Filous (m. 1974)
- Children: 2

Marc Summers (born Marc Berkowitz; November 11, 1951) is an American television personality, comedian, game show host, producer, and talk show host. He is best known for hosting Double Dare on Nickelodeon and Unwrapped on Food Network. Summers was also the executive producer for both Dinner: Impossible and Restaurant: Impossible, also for Food Network.

Since 2023, Summers has hosted the podcast Marc Summers Unwraps. He currently stars in a one-man show about his life titled The Life and Slimes of Marc Summers.

== Early life and career ==
Summers was born Marc Berkowitz in Indianapolis, Indiana, to a Jewish family. He attended Westlane Middle School and North Central High School in Indianapolis and Grahm Junior College in Boston.

After consulting with Rabbi Weitzman of Indianapolis Hebrew Congregation about whether to pursue a career as a rabbi or as an entertainer, Rabbi Weitzman told Summers, "As a rabbi, you can help a small congregation a lot, but as a performer you can help a lot of people a little." Summers decided that he preferred to help a lot of people, which set his path to becoming a performer. Summers was initially a professional magician, continuing what he started when he was younger.

Summers moved out to Los Angeles in 1972, taking a job as a page at CBS Television City. There, he got to do a variety of tasks on different shows, including filling in as announcer on The Joker's Wild, assisting with the audience warm-up on The Carol Burnett Show and helping with production on The New Price is Right.

At the beginning of his career, Summers was also a radio DJ and a stand-up comedian, although he held various television production jobs before a career boost in 1986, when Summers worked as the co-announcer with Gene Wood on ABC's short-lived game show Bruce Forsyth's Hot Streak.

== Double Dare ==
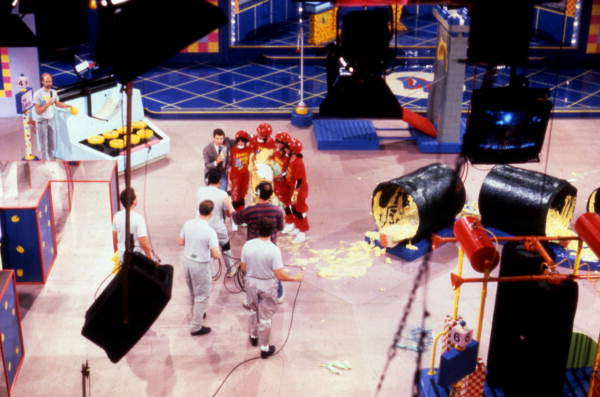
Summers on set of Double Dare in 1990

Summers' work on Bruce Forsyth's Hot Streak garnered the attention from Nickelodeon, which hired him as the host of Double Dare from 1986 to 1993.

According to Summers, a ventriloquist friend was called for an interview at Double Dare, but having never heard of Nickelodeon, sent Summers for the interview in his place. Summers was the first to interview for the job and was hired as the host.

== Later career ==
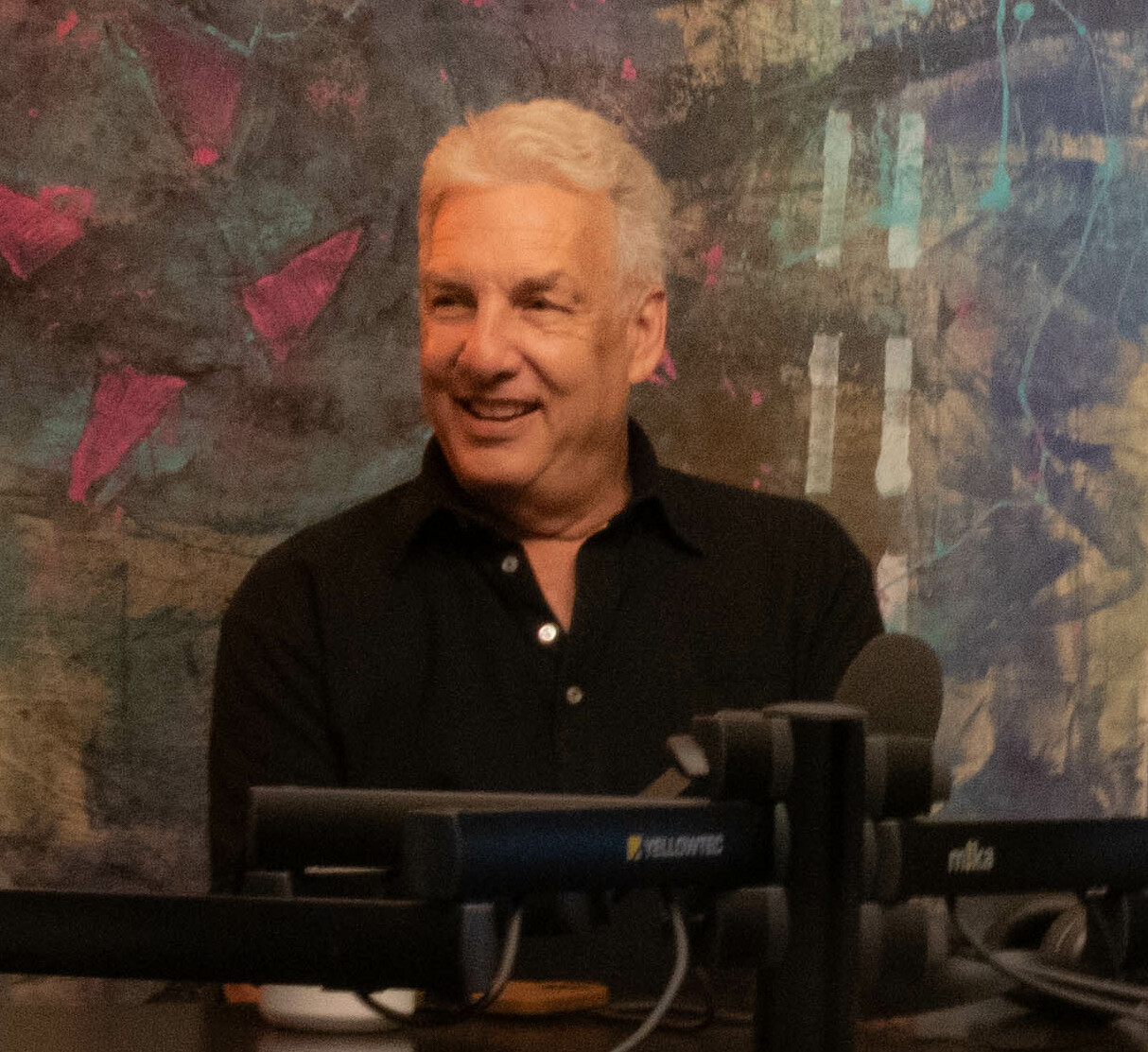
Summers in 2021

In 1989, Summers auditioned to host the CBS daytime version of Wheel of Fortune after Pat Sajak left to host the primetime syndicated version, but Bob Goen was hired instead.

Double Dare's popularity led Summers to other hosting jobs including the syndicated Couch Potatoes in 1989, and Nickelodeon's What Would You Do? in 1991.

In the late 1980s and early 1990s, Summers appeared on television talk shows, including a stint on ABC television's Home Show.

Summers also had a rare dramatic performance in the Nickelodeon-produced Halloween program Mystery Magical Special.

Summers also made celebrity guest rounds on other game shows including Scrabble, Super Password, Talk About, Lingo, To Tell the Truth, Win, Lose or Draw, and Hollywood Squares.

After Double Dare's cancellation in 1993, Summers co-hosted Our Home, a daily talk show aimed at homemakers, on Lifetime. Afterwards, Summers co-hosted another Lifetime talk show, Biggers & Summers.

In 1993, Summers hosted a special episode of Nova, called "The NOVA Quiz", celebrating the show's 20th anniversary season on PBS. Contestants answered science questions and participated in science experiments, for a chance to go on a science expedition.

Summers appeared on The Tonight Show with Jay Leno on October 17, 1994, alongside Burt Reynolds. According to Summers' account in his 1999 memoir Everything in Its Place, Reynolds arrived in a confrontational mood after Leno had made critical comments about Reynolds' ongoing divorce from Loni Anderson during the previous night's show. During his segment, Reynolds cut Leno's tie with scissors and engaged in increasingly tense exchanges with the host, culminating in Leno making a sexually suggestive joke about Reynolds just before Summers was brought on. When Summers mentioned being a "neatness fanatic", Reynolds began needling him aggressively. After Summers quipped "by the way, I'm still married", Reynolds dumped water onto Summers' lap. Summers retaliated by dousing Reynolds, receiving a standing ovation from the audience, and the confrontation ended with both men hitting each other with shaving cream pies. The incident generated significant media attention, and Summers later stated it was unplanned and genuine: "This was not planned, it was all real. […] It was like survival of the fittest. I was a comic. You wait your entire life to get on the Tonight Show, I wasn't going to let this guy fuck it up for me." According to Summers, the episode helped Leno tie David Letterman in the Nielsen ratings for the first time.

During the 1990s, Summers continued work on television shows, each with varying success. He created and hosted the short-lived children's game show Pick Your Brain, co-hosted Great Day America on the PAX Network, produced I Can't Believe You Said That, and hosted It's a Surprise on Food Network.

Summers returned to Nickelodeon in 2000 as the executive consultant for Double Dare 2000, an updated version of the original show. Two years later, he was the executive producer for another Nickelodeon resurrection, Wild and Crazy Kids.

GSN chose Summers to host its original program WinTuition in 2002.

On March 28, 2008, the Communication and Journalism Club of Coastal Carolina University presented Summers with the first annual Peach Cobbler Award, an honor modeled after Harvard's Hasty Pudding Award. After the ceremony, Summers hosted a mock version of Double Dare on the university's campus.

Summers returned to television as the host of more shows, including History IQ with his old announcer Harvey on the History Channel; the Food Network series Unwrapped; the Unwrapped spin-off game show, Trivia Unwrapped; and the Game Show Network series WinTuition. In 2005, Summers became the host of Food Network's reality series The Next Food Network Star. Summers joined Chef Guy Fieri as co-host of Food Network's Ultimate Recipe Showdown in 2008. In late 2006, Sony Pictures Television and KingWorld planned a new game show called Combination Lock, with Summers hosting the first pilot. It was to be paired with a revival of the classic game show, The Joker's Wild. However, a deal could not be reached between KingWorld and station groups.

Off the screen, Summers has been involved as an executive producer on the Food Network's Dinner: Impossible and Restaurant: Impossible.

Summers has hosted stage versions of The Price Is Right and credits Bob Barker and The Price Is Right for helping him pursue a game-show career.

Summers served as host of "Drunk Double Dare" during Drunk Day, an annual episode of the Philadelphia-based Preston & Steve radio show on WMMR, held directly before the Fourth of July weekend. The show reunited Summers with his Double Dare cohorts Harvey and Robin Marrella. He has also hosted "Dunkel Dare" during the annual Beer Week in Philadelphia, Pennsylvania.

Summers appears in the Good Charlotte music video for their song "Last Night", which uses Family Double Dare as the motif for the video. He has also played himself on The Cleveland Show, Robot Chicken, Workaholics, and Sanjay & Craig, and appeared in special segments on ABC's The Chew.

Summers is the subject and executive producer of On Your Marc, a documentary that chronicles his life and development of his one-man theater show, featuring interviews with Neil Patrick Harris, Ryan Seacrest, Guy Fieri and Seth Green, and was directed by Mathew Klickstein. Summers hosted a number of early preview screenings and live events as part of a nationwide promotional tour of the film in October 2017.

Summers returned to host a 30th anniversary of Double Dare at the 2016 San Diego Comic-Con. He also appeared in a commemorative half-hour special in honor of the show's 30th anniversary that aired on Nickelodeon on November 23, 2016.

In 2018, Summers provided color commentary along with his vast knowledge of the game on the revival of Double Dare with Liza Koshy, produced by RTL Group / FremantleMedia, and served as executive producer. In 2019, Summers hosted Double Dare Live, a non-broadcast, national touring version of the show.

Summers began hosting the Marc Summers Unwraps podcast in 2023. His one-man show The Life and Slimes of Marc Summers played off-Broadway at New World Stages from February to June 2024.

Summers starred in the Hallmark Original Movie Hanukkah on the Rocks, which premiered on Hallmark Channel in December 2024.

== Health ==
While co-hosting Biggers & Summers on Lifetime in 1994, at age 43, Summers discovered he had obsessive–compulsive disorder. According to his 1999 memoir Everything in Its Place, the show was preparing an episode featuring Dr. Eric Hollander, a psychiatrist and director of the Compulsive, Impulsive, and Anxiety Disorders Program at Mt. Sinai Hospital, and actress Mariette Hartley, the National Spokesperson for the Obsessive Compulsive Foundation. While reviewing prep material the night before the taping, Summers read a list of OCD symptoms, which included neatness, checking, cleaning, placing things symmetrically, compulsive rereading, and intrusive thoughts, and immediately recognized himself. During the live broadcast, Summers revealed his condition on-air mid-interview, telling Dr. Hollander "I think I have this" and sharing examples of how his compulsions had affected his children, including his son's initial refusal to finger paint at nursery school due to fear of getting his hands dirty.

Summers subsequently discussed his OCD on other television shows, including The Oprah Winfrey Show and Today. In 1999, Summers published his memoir with Hollander titled Everything in Its Place: My Trials and Triumphs with Obsessive Compulsive Disorder, detailing his experiences living with the condition. He also produced a VHS video box set about his experience and participated in a series of VHS videos for Freedom from Fear, a non-profit organization addressing anxiety disorders and other related behavioral disorders. Despite his OCD, Summers was able to interact fully with his fans and contestants on Double Dare to the point of even allowing himself to get slimed, as well as shaking hands with contestants. Going public with his OCD cost Summers a job as host of a Hollywood Squares revival, and he was replaced by Tom Bergeron.

In August 2012, Summers suffered severe head injuries in an accident in a Philadelphia taxicab equipped with a partition.

In a 2015 interview on the Philadelphia-based Preston & Steve radio show on WMMR, Summers revealed that six years before, in 2009, he had "stomach problems" and had been in a lot of pain. Exploratory surgery revealed that Summers had chronic lymphatic leukemia. The initial doctor recommended chemotherapy, but fearing the pain and illness involved, Summers sought the opinion of another oncologist in Chicago. The oncologist promptly misdiagnosed him with mantle cell lymphoma and told Summers that he only had six months to live. Summers went back to his initial doctor in a panic; ultimately the original diagnosis of chronic lymphatic leukemia was confirmed. Chemotherapy would go on for the next two years, which he described as "brutal". Summers has had PET scans ever since his chemo finished, and as of 2016 is in remission. On April 10, 2018, Summers was again a guest on Preston & Steve, and discussed flying to the University of Pennsylvania Medical Center from his home in Santa Barbara for further treatment.

In late 2019, in an in-person interview on KTLA's morning show, Summers revealed that he was again suffering from cancer. Summers did not volunteer which type of cancer he had, only saying that he was taking medication, and added, "I feel good, it's all going to be fantastic".
