= Springfield Confidential =

2018 non-fiction book by Mike Reiss

- Author: Mike Reiss with Mathew Klickstein
- Language: English
- Subject: comedy
- Genre: memoir
- Publisher: Dey Street Books
- Publication date: 2018
- Publication place: United States
- Pages: 299
- ISBN: 978-0-06-274803-4

Springfield Confidential: Jokes, Secrets, and Outright Lies from a Lifetime Writing for The Simpsons is a 2018 non-fiction book by American comedy writer Mike Reiss with Mathew Klickstein, with a foreword by Judd Apatow. The book is a memoir of Reiss's career, principally his time on The Simpsons.

Literary critics praised the book for the information it provided on the making of The Simpsons, and it was included on a list of 2018's best comedy books by Vulture and the best overall books of the year by the New York Post. It was also criticized for its organization, and for Reiss's comments on the Apu Nahasapeemapetilon controversy.

== Synopsis ==
The book details Reiss's career in comedy, starting with his time at The Harvard Lampoon to writing jokes for Johnny Carson and Garry Shandling in the 1980s, all alongside his long-time writing partner Al Jean. The bulk of the book is on his time on The Simpsons, as a writer, producer and showrunner. Reiss, who thought his career was over at the age of 28 by taking a job writing cartoons, worked on the show's early seasons at the height of "Bartmania". He also details the short-lived existence of The Critic, an animated series he created.

== Reception ==
Michael Cavna of The Washington Post praised the book for its details on the early years of The Simpsons.

Writing for Slate, Jack Hamilton found the book entertaining but was disappointed by its structure. He found that despite the book's title, Reiss admits in the first chapter that he only has one piece of gossip – the creative feud between Simpsons creator Matt Groening and developer Sam Simon in the show's formative years. He thought that it was unclear whether the book was supposed to be a Simpsons memoir or one on Reiss's wider career, and found the transitions between the two to be jarring.

Kyle Ryan of The A.V. Club found the chapters to be organized in an odd way, as if the information had been drafted in bullet points and then grouped together. He also believed that some of the trivia contained in the book was already well known to Simpsons fans, such as the origins of the family's first names.

Both Hamilton and Ryan criticized Reiss's take on the contemporary Apu Nahasapeemapetilon controversy – the author calls The Problem with Apu "a nasty little documentary". Hamilton found Reiss to be contradictory, in that he defends the character before concluding that he cannot tell Indians what they should find offensive. Ryan noted that Reiss says that schoolyard bullying of Indians by calling them Apu is not racism, but "kids [being] dicks".

A review by the Associated Press wrote "This entertaining book is certain to resonate with devotees and even those who only watch the show sporadically. Who, after all, wouldn’t want to know why the characters are yellow or which of the nation’s many Springfields can claim the Simpson family as its own?" Terri Schlichenmeyer of the Kent Reporter concluded "crumbs from nearly 30 years of “The Simpsons,” fun facts and trivia, reasoning for plots, secrets, and argument-enders for fans, guest-stars, never-beens, and stories of viewers around the world [...] missing “Springfield Confidential,” in fact, is reason to have a cow, man."

Brian Boone of Vulture named the book the seventh-best comedic book in 2018, reflecting that "not until Springfield Confidential has [a book] really nailed what it’s like to work in the mystical promised land of The Simpsons' offices, and it’s because this one is written by a guy who’s been part of the show for more or less its entire three-decade-long existence." The book also made an unordered list of the 28 best books of the year by the New York Post.
