= WinTuition =

- Genre: Game show
- Presented by: Marc Summers
- Starring: "Gorgeous George" Davidson
- Announcer: Burton Richardson
- Country of origin: United States
- No. of seasons: 1
- No. of episodes: 33

Production
- Running time: 22 minutes
- Production companies: LMNO Cable Group; Fair Dinkum Productions; Sugar Bros. Entertainment; Game Show Network Originals

Original release
- Network: Game Show Network
- Release: December 9, 2002 – April 1, 2003

WinTuition is an American game show created as an original series for Game Show Network, on which it originally ran from December 9, 2002 to April 1, 2003.

The game had a school-oriented theme in which three contestants competed to answer questions on general school-based subjects in an attempt to win a $50,000 college fund, hence the name of the show. The show was hosted by Marc Summers and announced by Burton Richardson. Henry Winkler served as the show's executive producer.

== History ==
WinTuition went into production and first aired on GSN in late 2002. The show was produced by Henry Winkler and hosted by Marc Summers. Lisa Kennedy Montgomery (then known by her stage name of Kennedy), who at the time was the host of Friend or Foe?, hosted one episode in 2003 as part of an April Fool's Day prank in which the hosts of Game Show Network's original series traded places. Incidentally, the show's April Fool's Day episode was the final episode of the series.

Burton Richardson announced the show, and a male model identified as "Gorgeous George" Davidson occasionally brought out props related to the questions.

== Gameplay ==
The main game was divided into twelve levels, or "grades," with each level containing question material appropriate to that particular grade. The subject of each grade was announced before the question was asked. All three players started the game with 500 points.

=== Round 1: Elementary School (1st–5th Grade) ===
One buzz-in question per grade level was asked for the first four grades, while in fifth grade every player was asked his/her own question as part of a spelling bee or matching/guessing game. Correct answers were worth 100 points each; missed questions cost the player 100. In first through fourth grades, a miss allowed the opponents a chance to buzz in and steal the points. On some episodes, an elementary school age student provided a home viewer question before the commercial break at the end of this round, then gave the answer after the break ended.

=== Round 2: Middle School (6th–-8th Grade) ===
Questions in this round had several correct answers (four each in sixth and seventh grades, seven in eighth grade), each of which was worth 250 points. Each player got to give one answer in turn, starting with whoever buzzed in first; once a player responded incorrectly, he/she lost no points but was frozen out of the rest of the question. If two players became frozen out, the third one could attempt any or all remaining parts. A question ended once all correct answers had been given or all three players missed, whichever came first. The player with the lowest score by the end of 8th Grade was "expelled" / eliminated from the game and received consolation prizes. In case of a tie for second place, a sudden-death toss-up question will be asked and will decide who will move on to High School.

The first player to give a correct answer in this round won a $200 bonus prize, either as a gift certificate for Domino's Pizza or as quarters ostensibly for "washing machines".

=== Round 3: High School (9th–12th Grade) ===
Starting with the leader, the two remaining players took turns answering questions ranging from 9th to 12th grade, with each grade consisting of a single question from a given subject. Correct answers awarded 500 points, while incorrect ones deducted 500. Each player could "cut class" once during this round after hearing the subject for a question on which he/she had control. Doing so forced the opponent to answer the question instead.

After the 12th grade question, the "Senior Year Showdown" was played, consisting of questions in a single subject chosen by the leader from two options. Players continued to answer alternating questions worth 500 points each, starting with the leader. As soon as a player missed a question, he/she lost no points but was frozen out of the round; if the leader missed first, the trailing player could continue answering questions in an attempt to tie or take the lead. The high scorer at the end of this round won a prize package and moved on to the bonus round, while the other received consolation prizes.

=== Bonus Round: The $50,000 Final Exam ===
Seated at the "Desk of Destiny" (a small wooden school desk), the winner had 60 seconds to answer 10 questions in various subjects. He/she could not return to passed or missed questions. Each correct answer awarded the winner $250, with a $50,000 college fund awarded for 10 correct answers.

== Airing history ==
WinTuition aired daily at 8:30 p.m. eastern time on GSN. The show lasted for one season of 33 episodes.
