= The Life and Slimes of Marc Summers =

2016 one-man show starring Marc Summers

- Logo for the show's 2024 off-Broadway run
- Original title: Everything in Its Place: The Life and Slimes of Marc Summers
- Original language: English
- Written by: Alex Brightman
- Based on: Everything in Its Place: My Trials and Triumphs with Obsessive Compulsive Disorder by Marc Summers (1999)
- Music by: Drew Gasparini
- Subject: Marc Summers
- Genre: One-person show

Premiere
- Date: April 1, 2016
- Place: Ted Jones Playhouse, Bloomington
- Directed by: Chad Rabinovitz
- Official website

The Life and Slimes of Marc Summers is a one-man stage performance by American stage and screen actor Marc Summers.

The performance takes place on a replica of the original Double Dare set, with audience members competing in stunts from the show to accentuate Summers's narration of his life's triumphs and setbacks.

Alex Brightman adapted Summers's 1999 memoir as the basis for the work, which recounted his struggles with obsessive–compulsive disorder (OCD). The 2017 Mathew Klickstein documentary On Your Marc was centered around the play's development.

== Development ==
Marc Summers met composer Drew Gasparini in 2011 while they were both performing in a summer stock production of Grease at Surflight Theatre in Beach Haven, New Jersey. Gasparini became enamored by Summers' stories about his career.

Summers was badly injured in a 2012 car accident, and prioritized stepping on stage again as the one thing he wished to do before he died. Gasparini put him in touch with his friend Alex Brightman, and they began developing a play about his life.

Brightman based the script on Summers' 1999 memoir Everything in Its Place: My Trials and Triumphs with Obsessive Compulsive Disorder along with new interviews he conducted himself. It was originally conceived as a musical with Summers singing, but instead was changed to a one-man play supported by Gasparini's music.

Mathew Klickstein was author of the 2013 book Slimed!: An Oral History of Nickelodeon's Golden Age, for which Summers had contributed as a participant and also wrote its foreword. Klickstein filmed the play's development, rehearsals, and initial performances in his documentary On Your Marc, which was released with a multi-city screening tour in 2017.

== Performances ==
=== Ted Jones Playhouse, Bloomington (2016) ===
The show was first presented as Everything in Its Place: The Life and Slimes of Marc Summers at the Ted Jones Playhouse in Bloomington, Indiana from 1 to 2 April 2016, 7 to 9 April 2016, and 14 to 16 April 2016, directed by Chad Rabinovitz. Summers had grown up in nearby Indianapolis.

=== Charles R. Wood Theater, Glens Falls (2016) ===
A second engagement took place at the Charles R. Wood Theater in Glens Falls, New York from 10 to 13 August 2016 as part of the Adirondack Theatre Festival.

=== Mt. Gretna Playhouse, Mt. Gretna (2023) ===
The Life and Slimes of Marc Summers was revived under a shortened title from 3 to 6 August 2023 at Mt. Gretna Playhouse in Mt. Gretna, Pennsylvania. These shows were sparsely attended, and Summers had to be talked out of cancelling the scheduled tour by director Chad Rabinovitz.

=== Alleyway Theatre, Buffalo (2023) ===
The revival continued from 9 to 30 September 2023 at Alleyway Theatre in Buffalo, New York.

Stephen Edlund was directing Mrs. Doubtfire at nearby Shea's Performing Arts Center, and came to see Summers perform during this run. Edlund then connected Summers with New York City producer Lisa Dozier Shacket, and plans were made to move the show off-Broadway.

=== New World Stages, Off-Broadway (2024) ===
Summers debuted the show off-Broadway for a 16-week engagement at New World Stages from February 14, 2024 to June 2, 2024. His friend and former Food Network co-host Guy Fieri was one of the show's producers.

== Awards and nominations ==
Year	Award	Category	Nominee	Result
2024	Off Broadway Alliance Award	Best Unique Theatrical Experience		Nominated
