= Wild & Crazy Kids =

- Created by: Woody Fraser
- Presented by: Annette Chavez; Jessica Gaynes; Omar Gooding; Donnie Jeffcoat; Mati Moralejo
- Theme music composer: Wendy Fraser; Todd Sharp
- Composers: Don Great (seasons 1-2); Alan Ett (seasons 2-3)
- Country of origin: United States
- No. of episodes: 75

Production
- Executive producer: Woody Fraser
- Producer: Noah Edelson
- Running time: 22 minutes
- Production companies: Woody Fraser Productions; Nickelodeon Productions; Reeves Entertainment (1990-1992); Valencia Entertainment International (2002)

Original release
- Network: Nickelodeon
- Release: July 4, 1990 – December 1, 1992
- Release: July 29 – October 7, 2002

Wild & Crazy Kids is an American television game show in which large teams, usually consisting entirely of children, participated in head-to-head physical challenges on Nickelodeon. The show ran for three seasons from 1990 to 1992, producing a total of 65 episodes. Wild & Crazy Kids starred teenage co-hosts Omar Gooding and Donnie Jeffcoat throughout all three seasons, accompanied by Annette Chavez in the first season and Jessica Gaynes in the second and third seasons.

In 2002, a revival series was produced that lasted for 10 episodes and aired on Nickelodeon from July 29 to October 7, 2002. It was hosted by Mati Moralejo of Nick GAS.

== Games ==
Each episode consisted of three games with one host emceeing each game. The teams were identified by the color of the shirts they wore, which varied from show to show (see below). The games varied in style; many were take-offs on playground games, sports with unusual rules added, or messy games involving pies or slime (the latter was referred to as "blap" beginning in season three). The majority of shows were filmed at various community parks and beaches in the greater Los Angeles area, including locations in San Bernardino, Fullerton, and Glendale. Occasionally, the show taped special episodes at a theme park such as Raging Waters, Wild Rivers, and Six Flags Magic Mountain. Unlike other Nickelodeon game shows, no prizes were ever awarded to any of the players.

=== Take-offs on sports ===
- The most often repeated (once per season) game was Dizzy Bat Home Run Derby. The game consisted of two teams (one of kids and one of adults) batting in three innings. The kids would attempt to hit home runs off of pitched balls (temporary and closer fencing was put up); any ball that did not leave the field in fair territory was as an out. Once the kids had three outs, the adults would bat. During their half-inning, a grownup would have up to three chances to hit home runs off a batting tee; however, the adult was first required to hold his bat upright against his forehead and spin around it three times; furthermore, each adult would only get thirty seconds to hit the balls. Three adults would bat every half-inning. Donnie Jeffcoat hosted the game all three times.
- Three-Legged Soccer, where kids were tied at the ankle like in a three-legged race.
- Splash Football, where quarterback Rodney Peete would throw footballs to kids jumping off a diving board and into a pool.
- Bumper Boat Lacrosse, played in bumper boats.
- Donkey Basketball, played with kids on donkeys.

=== Playground games ===
- A wacky game of Simon Says led by Brian Seeman.
- Red light/Green light, retitled Red Pie/Green Pie, where if a child was caught trying to advance after the call of "red light", they hit them self with a pie. If they reached their goal, they hit one of their parents with the pie.
- Cops and Robbers played on the set of the Miami Vice Spectacular at Universal Studios Hollywood.
- A Tug of War pitting three professional wrestlers against a team of kids. The wrestlers would face-off against a growing number of kids each round, starting at one and then going to all fifty kids.

=== Other popular games ===
- Gunk in the Sky Challenge; similar to Pie in the Sky from What Would You Do?, except featuring slime instead of pies. Players would sit under a large bucket of goop, but if they flinched, their opponent got to dump the slime on them.
- Human Battleship; where the spaces selected by the players had a giant bucket of navy beans dumped on them (as well as any participant serving as a "ship" in that space.) from giant crane above the board.
- Mustard-Ketchup Quickdraw; where opposing teammates would draw and shoot ketchup and mustard bottles at each-other. The winner received a large number of points for their team, while the loser could earn consolation points by enacting a dramatic death, ultimately falling into an inflatable pool of pie filling.
- Pass the Bucket; A modified version of "Steal the Bacon" involving three teams where the object to be retrieved was a bucket of a mystery substance; contestants who lost a round got its contents dumped onto their heads. To win a round, a player must either steal the bucket without getting tagged by both opponents or tag a thieving player.
- Slime by Numbers; Kids sat above their parents holding numbered buckets of slime. The parents had to pick a number, and the kid who had the bucket with the number the parent chose got to pour the bucket of slime over the head of the person seated below them. The last parent remaining would move on to the final round. Kids and parents then reversed, and likewise, the last kid not to be slimed also got to move on to the last round. In it, the last two players would be seated below two extra large buckets (one had green slime, and the other had confetti). They would pick a number, and the loser (usually the parent) was slimed.
- Slime Dump-Off; where players would sit across from each-other with a big bucket of slime raised between them, and the winning team would get to dump the slime on the loser.
- Sloppy Word Find; where players would face off to find a hidden word (such as baked beans, eggs, and dog food) on a crossword puzzle style board, with the winner getting to dump a bucket of the word they find on the loser.
- Smelly Slip 'n' Slide; A Slip 'n' Slide race between two teams would be racing to see who could make it past the finish line first. The loser would be dumped on with buckets of stewed tomatoes upon finishing.
- Other games included; A massive game of Twister, Human Space Invaders, Bleacher Pass Relay, and Spiderweb Stickup.

== Development and production ==
A pilot was shot in 1989, hosted by Matt Brown (who co-hosted Don't Just Sit There on Nickelodeon), Leslie Hibbard and Cory Tyler.

== Guest appearances ==
During the first and second seasons, there were occasionally adult celebrity guests, and one of Season 2's final episodes held a kids and teens celebrity slide competition game at Raging Waters in San Dimas, California to raise money for the Cystic Fibrosis Foundation. The entire third season in 1992 featured at least one (and sometimes more) kid celebrity guest(s) every episode. Guests were people like actor and former bodybuilder Arnold Schwarzenegger, Lark Voorhies from Saved by the Bell, Jonathan Taylor Thomas from Home Improvement, Ashley Johnson from Growing Pains, and Michael Fishman from Roseanne. A young Tobey Maguire appeared on the show long before he was famous, promoting the short-lived Fox sitcom Great Scott!

Other appearances include

- Marc Summers from Double Dare and What Would You Do? who appeared in 1990 in a special episode titled "Double Dare vs. Wild & Crazy Kids". At the end of the episode, when Team Double Dare won, and Marc tricks Donnie, Omar, and Jessica into a green sliming. He also appeared the following year to pitch in "Dizzy Bat Home Run Derby: The Sequel".
- California Angels pitcher Scott Bailes pitched the first "Dizzy Bat Home Run Derby", and Bruce Hurst of the San Diego Padres pitched the third and final installment.
- Detroit Lions quarterback Rodney Peete appeared on the premiere episode throwing footballs to kids jumping into a swimming pool.
- Michael Bower, Venus DeMilo, and Danny Cooksey from the Nickelodeon series Salute Your Shorts appeared on one of the final episodes of the original run. This show pitted two teams—one headed by the Salute Your Shorts crew and the other headed by the three Wild & Crazy Kids co-hosts—in an all day showdown.
- Olympic skier Bode Miller appeared on the 2002 revival.
- Brandon Call was in season 2, and as payback for his Wild & Crazy Kids shirt being in the Goo Pool with shorts and shoes, he took Donnie's shirt, Omar's shorts and Jessica's shoes and ran off to put them into the Goo Pool with the hosts chasing after him.
- Daryl Sabara and Alexa Vega of the Spy Kids movies appeared on the revival.

== Production ==
The show was executive produced by Woody Fraser and aired 65 episodes from July 4, 1990, to December 1, 1992. Reruns aired on Nickelodeon from December 2, 1992, to February 28, 1999, before moving to Nick GAS on March 1, 1999, where it remained until November 1, 2005. The series was produced by Woody Fraser Productions in association with Nickelodeon and Reeves Entertainment Group.
