= Mathew Klickstein =

American dramatist

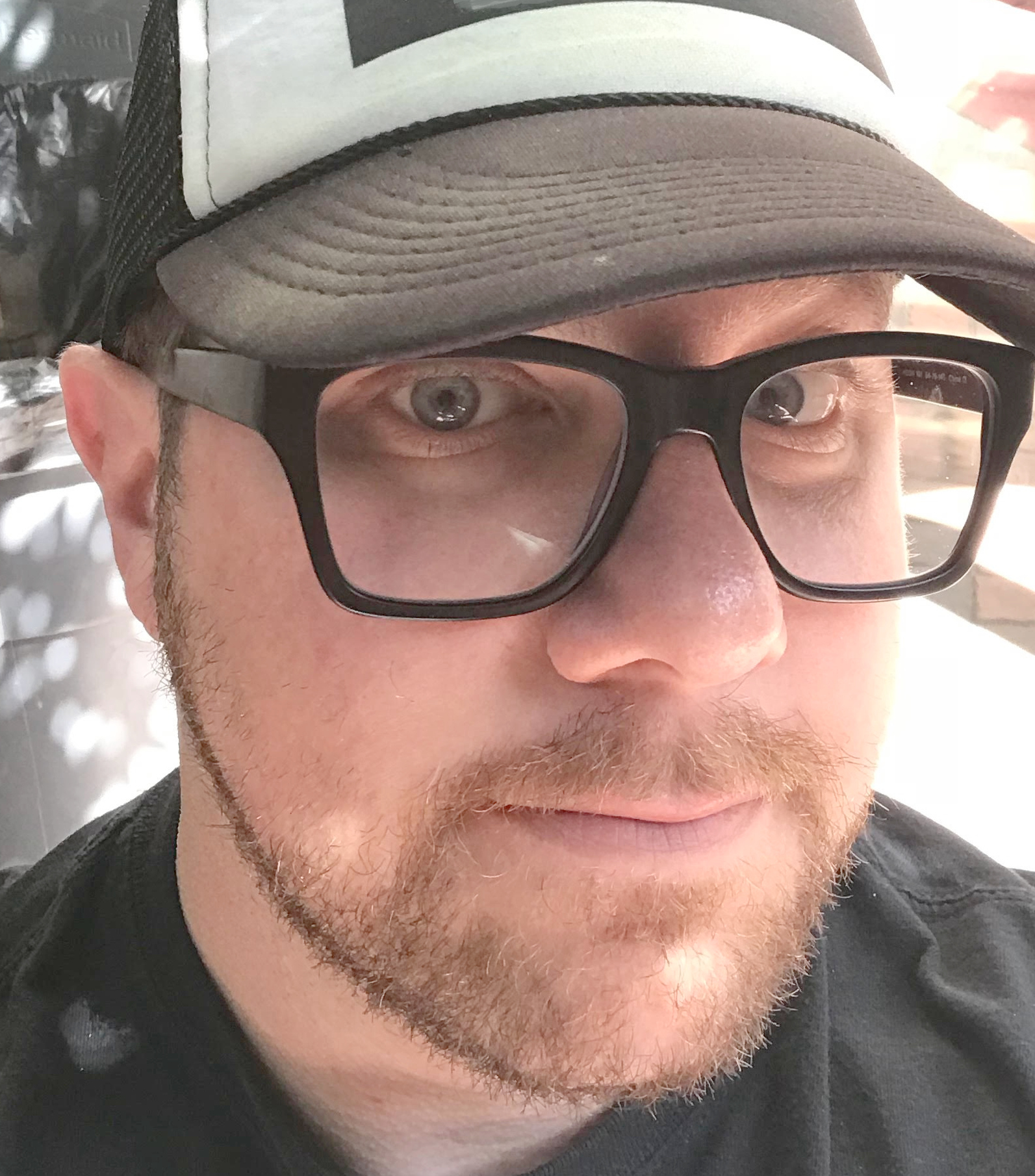
- Mathew Klickstein, photographed in 2018.
- Born: California
- Occupations: Screenwriter; Journalist; Author; Therapist; Playwright

Mathew Klickstein is an American screenwriter, journalist, author, arts therapist and playwright.

== Career ==
Klickstein was the writer of the 2009 American horror film Against the Dark, starring Steven Seagal and served as a casting producer on Food Network's Restaurant: Impossible from 2013 until the series ended in 2016. Born in California, Mathew was a prolific writer at a young age, penning his first novel at 13. A high-achieving student in high school, Mathew formed and ran various academic clubs while working on local congressional campaigns and for the ACLU. In 2012 he co-produced, co-directed and co-wrote Phamaly Theatre Company's disLabled, a multimedia performance involving actors with disabilities.

Klickstein's non-fiction book titled SLIMED! An Oral History of Nickelodeon's Golden Age, which covers the early development of Nickelodeon., was featured on Parade's "Year's Best Books About Movies and TV" for 2013, listed as one of the top four tell-all books of 2013 by Entertainment Weekly and picked as one of the top ten social science books by Publishers Weekly. On May 12, 2022, the book was referenced as part of an answer on Jeopardy!

A 5th Anniversary Edition of the book was released on May 7, 2019, including a new introduction by Nick Arcade host Phil Moore.

On September 27, 2013, Klickstein moderated a three-hour long series of panels with more than 40 creative members of the Nickelodeon community, including actors, producers, writers, show creators and network personnel at the 92nd Street Y in New York called Double Dare We Say It: A Nickelodeon Historical Celebration.

The event was also produced by Klickstein, hosted by Marc Summers and included the first live performance by the Beets, a fictional band featured on the animated Nickelodeon series Doug, made up of Fred Newman and Dan Sawyer who produced the music and sound effects for the show.

Similar reunion and panel events followed at Book Soup, Innisfree Poetry Bookstore and Cafe, Iowa City's FilmScene and, in 2014, various others as part of a short Jewish Book Council tour

Klickstein has written for multiple publications, including Wired, New York Daily News, Alternative Press, Boulder Weekly, Baltimore Sun, Baltimore Jewish Times, Splitsider, Yellow Scene, Daily Camera, Colorado Daily, iTech Post, Ink Magazine, Hammer to Nail, and OC Weekly.

In late 2017, Klickstein completed his most recent film On Your Marc, a documentary about television personality Marc Summers and the development of his stage show The Life and Slimes of Marc Summers. He also produced a nationwide tour of preview screenings and live events in Los Angeles, Brooklyn, Philadelphia, Austin, Baltimore and Chicago.

Klickstein has worked with various organizations around the country as an arts therapist to assist persons with disabilities, including Boulder, Colorado's Imagine! facilities. In 2010, he partnered Imagine! with Yellow Scene Magazine to create an adaptive journalism class for Imagine! clients, which he instructed and whose monthly articles were published by Yellow Scene.

In 2016, Klickstein became the host of NERTZ, an interview-based podcast focusing on Nerd/Geek Culture. The podcast is based on Klickstein's book Nerding Out: How Pop Culture Ruined the Misfit, released in China in 2018. Guests have included Diablo Cody, Alex Winter, Mike Reiss, Missy Suicide, Adam Bradley, and John Park, co-creator of the fictional Flo (Progressive) Insurance spokeswoman. Starting in June 2020, Heavy Metal Magazine partnered with Klickstein to distribute his NERTZ episodes via their streaming and social networks.

Working for eight months with Kansas-based Orange Mouse Theatricals and a group of local girls, Klickstein ran a series of workshops in order to produce and co-write a gender-bending, immersive theatrical experience thematically based on William Golding's 1954 novel Lord of the Flies. The final piece, titled Ladies of the Fly, was performed by the girls involved in the writing process and opened at Cider Gallery in Lawrence, Kansas, on August 26, 2016.

During the summer of 2021, Klickstein partnered with Dayton, Ohio theater organization Dare 2 Defy to produce and lead a series of writing workshops with a group of children (ages 11–15) that resulted in an original play based on the personalities and lives of the workshop participants themselves, as well as the themes of George Orwell's Animal Farm. The play, Plagiarism Is Fun! The Musical, was performed at The Brightside Music & Event Venue on August 10 and 11, 2021. ] Throughout spring 2022, Klickstein ran a weekly writing workshop with kids ages 8–13 in Dayton, once again with Dare 2 Defy (renamed TheatreLab Dayton). The children performed their series of interconnected monologues telling a full story of monsters, space travel, and science experiments going awry in early June 2022.

In late 2024, Klickstein was prominently featured as a children's programming and pop culture expert in Demi Lovato's directorial debut, the documentary Child Star, which also featured the likes of: Drew Barrymore, Kenan Thompson, Raven-Symoné, Christina Ricci and filmmaker Chris Columbus. As a pop culture historian, Klickstein has contributed to numerous online and print articles such as those published by Slate, Thrillist, Sports Illustrated, NPR and The Ringer as well as TMZ Presents and WGN Radio.

Klickstein co-authored Emmy Award-winning comedy writer Mike Reiss' memoir, Springfield Confidential: Jokes, Secrets, and Outright Lies from a Lifetime Writing for The Simpsons, published by HarperCollins imprint Dey Street in June 2018. 'Kirkus Reviews referred to the book as "a charming look at a cherished American show." Vanity Fair (magazine) called the book "extremely funny." The book was also briefly excerpted in The New Yorker, and The Wall Street Journal. USA Today's Bill Keveney called the work "... full of humorous asides and fun facts." Vulture listed Springfield Confidential among its "Top Ten Comedy Books of 2018." The New York Post included Springfield Confidential in its list of "Most Unforgettable Books of 2018." The book was a semifinalist for 2019's Thurber Prize for American Humor. Klickstein has also traveled to various cities and community spaces in order to speak on the cultural relevance of The Simpsons. Klickstein co-wrote the comedic memoir Being Mr. Skin: 20 Years of Nip Slips, Cheek Peeks, and Fast-Forwarding to the Good Parts about the unlikely pop culture icon and creator of one of the first-ever commercially successful websites, Jim "Mr. Skin" McBride, made famous by the likes of Knocked Up, Howard Stern, Family Guy and Saturday Night Live. Foreword by Adam Carolla and original comix written by Klickstein and illustrated by Eisner Award nominee Johnny Ryan. As associate producer, Klickstein worked with McBride on his documentary Skin: A History of Nudity in the Movies, which came out August 18, 2020 and features interviews with such cinema icons as Amy Heckerling, Pam Grier, Malcolm McDowell, John Cameron Mitchell, Mariel Hemingway, Richard Roeper, Kevin Smith, Peter Bogdanovich and Mamie Van Doren. The film is available for streaming on Hulu, Amazon Prime and VoD.

His Selling Nostalgia: A Neurotic Novel, a comedic look at so-called "geek culture" and the media frenzy surrounding it was published by Post Hill Press imprint Permuted Press and distributed by Simon & Schuster on August 13, 2019. The Washington Post wrote of the novel, "Klickstein ... delivers a searing critique of geek culture and the trouble with indulging nostalgia at the expense of reckoning with reality. Though he didn't set out to write a social commentary, it's on that level that he finds the most success."

Klickstein's first comic book series, You Are Obsolete, is a modern tech twist on Children of the Corn. The first issue was published by AfterShock Comics in September 2019. The series was featured in a New York Times roundup of forthcoming comics in August 2019. AiPT! said of the first issue: "You Are Obsolete #1 is a terrifyingly good read. It will keep you guessing with every turn of the page. The dialogue is solid, the pacing is on point, and the mystery behind the children is just terrific. If you love a good spine-chilling story shrouded in mystery, you need to download this book or get to your local comic shop today. Klickstein and Bornyakov definitely have a hit on their hands — Netflix, you need to make a live-action adaption pronto." The trade paperback edition of all five issues collected as a graphic novel was originally slated for release April 8, 2020, but was postponed due to complications resulting from the COVID-19 pandemic until June 17, 2020, after which Klickstein traveled on a six-state promotional tour to comic book shops around the Midwest area.

His six-part audio documentary Comic-Con Begins: Origin Stories of the San Diego Comic-Con and the Rise of Modern Fandom launched June 22, 2021 via SiriusXM and tells the full-story of the largest pop culture event on the planet as told by more than 50 original contributors to the Con and various high-profile celebrity guests. "All of this makes a colorful story, especially from the mouths of the people who lived it firsthand," according to Forbes.

His middle-grade reader So Good to Be Bad was published as an audiobook original by Blackstone on September 28, 2021. Of the humorous throwback to the likes of Roald Dahl, Judy Blume, and Louis Sachar, #1 New York Times bestselling author Gordon Korman proclaimed, "If you like to laugh, this is the GOOD/BAD story for you!"

Klickstein worked with alt-comedy pioneer Beth Lapides on the Recorded Books audiobook original So You Need to Decide, with such special guest contributors as: Bob Odenkirk, Margaret Cho, Judy Gold, Sandra Bernhard, Phoebe Bridgers, Julia Sweeney, Dana Gould, and The Queen's Gambit creator Scott Frank. The audiobook was released January 18, 2022. Vulture included the audiobook on its "Best Comedy Books of 2022 (So Far)" list of March 2022.

On September 6, 2022, Fantagraphics published Klickstein's See You at San Diego: An Oral History of Comic-Con, Fandom, and the Triumph of Geek Culture, an expansion of his Comic-Con Begins. Forewords were written by cartoonists Stan Sakai and Jeff Smith, and Wu-Tang Clan's RZA penned its afterword. Fangoria called the book "an essential and defining resource of the forces that have transformed popular culture over the course of the past century." Nerdist praised the book's chronicling of "the nexus of nerd culture." And Boing Boing called the book "a fantastic, exhaustive look at the rise of geek fandom and culture over the past century through the lens of San Diego Comic-Con." Blackstone released the audiobook version on the same day as the physical book's release. Klickstein once again produced and hosted a series of touring events throughout the country as well as Canada.

On March 28, 2024, it was announced that Klickstein would be teaming up with Academy Award and Emmy Award nominated executive producer David Permut and producer Oscar Boyson on a feature-length documentary about Comic-Con, based on his book and podcast series.

On November 22, 2022, Callisto Media published Klickstein's The Little Encyclopedia of Jewish Culture. The book is a light-hearted, illustrated guide to the people, foods, places, and other icons of Jewish culture, and received such lauds as "I'm the kind of Jew who would devour The Little Encyclopedia of Jewish Culture" from comedian, musician, and Dr. Katz, Professional Therapist creator/star Jonathan Katz.

Klickstein has worked over the years as a marketing/publicity consultant for a variety of artistic, media, tech, educational, community and nonprofit organizations including most recently as "University Writer" at Central State University, Ohio's only public HBCU.

Klickstein's graphic novel Daisy Goes to the Moon, based on his 2008 novella originally published by Portland-area upstart AtomSmashers, was illustrated by Rick Geary (creator of the inaugural Comic-Con logo and cartoonist for the likes of National Lampoon and Heavy Metal Magazine) and published by Fantagraphics in January 2025. Said Publishers Weekly, "Geary ably adapts Klickstein's whimsical novel, written in the naive voice of real-life Victorian child author Daisy Ashford. ... Geary's artwork, with touches that recall turn-of-the-century comic strips and antique printing techniques, is perfectly suited to Victoriana.". The book went on to be named amongst the "Best Comics of 2025" by The Comics Journal, which noted, "Young readers will delight in [Daisy's] lovable self-admiration, bravery, cleverness, and playful wordplay, as well as her lighthearted, endearing companions. Adults will appreciate the antiquarian science, as well as giggle at Daisy’s spirit and cheekiness. Read it together with the kids. You’ll love it to the moon and back."

One month later, in February 2025, Klickstein's book Lloyd Kaufman:Interviews was published in hardcover, paperback and e-book editions. The book was the latest installment in University Press of Mississippi's prestigious and long-running Conversations With Filmmakers series.

The book was an instant bestseller across multiple categories upon first being up for pre-sales, including such categories as general "Horror Movies" and "Motion Picture Directors.". The Beat suggested that the book is "perhaps one of the most richly diverse, eclectic, hilarious, and smart collections of interviews in the market. Its scope and the breadth of its themes and discussions all point to a life of legend.”

After assisting Patrick "The Common Sense Cowboy" Dorinson—longtime communications expert to the likes of Al Gore and Arnold Schwarzenegger, frequent news commentator and cowboy lifestyle personality—with his new book The Common Sense Cowboy's Guide to Life in early 2026, Klickstein produced and hosted an hour-long Q&A with Dorinson for C-SPAN that aired throughout the month of March 2026 about the book about which presidential historian and New York Times bestselling author Craig Shirley said, “Some books give good advice, some bad. This book gives good advice—something you might want to read, absorb and put into practice. I hope that, in reading the book before you, you may acquire a few more strategies for how to avoid the bad things, do the good things...and hopefully have a few laughs along the way.”

Klickstein has additionally taken on the role of writing coach for fellow storytellers, including Northern Colorado whiskey magnate Matt Estrin CEO/Founder of 477 Distilling) whose book I Know the Owner: From Holy Water to Happy Hour Klickstein worked on and was set for an October 2026 release date through Koehler Books.

== The Kids of Widney High ==
Klickstein has worked with The Kids of Widney High, a group of young adults with developmental disabilities who write, record and perform rock songs. His work with the group includes the production of numerous short films, music videos, visual art and creative writing projects. He co-directed and produced the 2010 feature-length rockumentary Act Your Age: The Kids of Widney High Story, a chronicle of the band's West Coast tour. Starting in November, 2020, a remastered tenth anniversary edition of the film began streaming on Troma's streaming service Troma Now.

The Kids of Widney Junior High Take Over the World! is a middle-grade reader (ages 8–12) that Klickstein wrote and which was illustrated by comic book creator Michael S. Bracco (aka Spaghetti Kiss). The book includes three downloadable Kids of Widney High songs, an exclusive interview with a Kids of Widney High member, and was released through Schiffer Publishing. Thanks in part to direct promotion by The Big Bang Theory and Blossom star Mayim Bialik, the book quickly became a bestseller on Amazon. The book was an Independent Publisher Book Awards winner for 2021 (Juvenile Fiction).

== Bibliography ==
=== Books ===
- The Common Sense Cowboy's Guide to Life: Stories from the Old Guy at the End of the Bar (2026, Humanix)
- Lloyd Kaufman:Interviews (2025, University Press of Mississippi)
- Daisy Goes to the Moon (2025, Fantagraphics)
- The Little Encyclopedia of Jewish Culture (2022, Rockridge Press)
- See You at San Diego: An Oral History of Comic-Con, Fandom, and the Triumph of Geek Culture (2022, Fantagraphics)
- So You Need to Decide (2022, Recorded Books)
- So Good to Be Bad (2021, Blackstone)
- The Kids of Widney Junior High Take Over the World! (2020, Schiffer Publishing)
- Selling Nostalgia: A Neurotic Novel (2019, Post Hill Press)
- Being Mr. Skin: 20 Years of Nip Slips, Cheek Peeks, and Fast-Forwarding to the Good Parts (2019, Post Hill)
- Springfield Confidential: Jokes, Secrets, and Outright Lies from a Lifetime Writing for The Simpsons (2018, Dey Street)
- Nerding Out: How Pop Culture Ruined the Misfit (2018, Business Weekly)
- Slimed!: An Oral History of Nickelodeon's Golden Age (2013, Plume)
- Daisy Goes to the Moon (2009, Atomsmashers)
