= What Would You Do? (1991 TV program) =

- What Would You Do? Logo taken from opening theme.
- Presented by: Marc Summers
- Theme music composer: Wendy DeAugustine
- Composers: Alan Ett (Season 1); Terry Esau (Season 2)
- Country of origin: United States
- No. of seasons: 2
- No. of episodes: 90

Production
- Production locations: Universal Studios; Orlando, Florida
- Running time: 30 minutes
- Production companies: Woody Fraser Productions (Season 1); Reeves Entertainment

Original release
- Network: Nickelodeon
- Release: August 31, 1991 – November 12, 1993

What Would You Do? is an American television game show hosted by Marc Summers that aired on Nickelodeon from 1991 to 1993. The show featured filmed scenarios involving members of the public, alongside games and physical challenges performed by studio audience volunteers, including activities including pies. Robin Marrella appeared as an on-camera assistant. The show was taped in Orlando, Florida, with segments filmed at Universal Studios.

== Format ==
Each episode featured prerecorded footage of children, families or other members of the public in unusual situations. Before the outcome was revealed, Summers paused the footage and asked the studio audience to vote on what they would do in the same situation or what they thought would happen. Special guests appeared on What Would You Do?, and audience members volunteered to perform unusual stunts, including interacting with animals and eating unusual foods.

== Segments ==
=== Anything You Can Do... ===
Additional segments included contests between two selected audience members ("Anything You Can Do"). These contests ranged from who could finish a glass of milk the fastest, to seeing who could inflate and pop a balloon the fastest. The end result of these contests would be the winner having the opportunity to smash a whipped cream pie in the face of the loser (or send the loser to one of the show's pie contraptions). This type of contest often pitted a child against his or her parent. This feature was used in the second (1993) season.

=== What Would You Do? Medley ===
The end of each episode in the first season featured the What Would You Do? Medley, where certain audience members and Summers had index cards attached to their foreheads; usually, any special guests on the show would also participate in the Medley. Each card had a different stunt listed on it. One card would usually have a stunt based on a segment from earlier in the show. The participant either had to do what it said on the card, sight unseen, or be sent to the Pie Pod.

=== Wall o' Stuff ===
In the second season, the Medley was replaced with the Wall o' Stuff, a wall of numbered doors, each hiding a prize or surprise. Each audience member was assigned a number. If their number was drawn from a lottery machine, that participant received a token to open one of the 20 doors. Some of the doors had What Would You Do? merchandise, such as a T-shirt or a gym bag. Others concealed pies that would be flung at the contestants' face (or a water cannon filled with whipped cream which would be squirted at the contestant). In addition, an unlucky participant could receive a card that sent them to one of the pie contraptions upon reading the paper containing a poem that is associated with the pie contraptions. Sometimes the contestant received a card that instructed them to open another door. On one occasion, a door contained a card that said "Pie Marc" so Marc got a pie in the face from the audience member.

Sometimes, winning a stunt would award a token for the Wall o' Stuff. In these instances, those who won their tokens would take their turn at the Wall before any balls were drawn from the lottery machine.

The only doors were not chosen were doors 14 and 17.

== Pie contraptions ==
The cream pie was central to the show's premise, and was frequently doled out as "punishment" (or sometimes, a reward) for anything. Whenever audience members were picked to perform a stunt, they were often given the option to either perform it or go to one of several pie contraptions. Alternatively, failure to complete a stunt could also send someone to one of these devices. In the first season Robin would place the audience member in the contraption, but during the second season, staff members wearing red jumpsuits that read "Pie Pod Attendant", "Pie Wash Attendant", or "Pie Coaster Attendant" took over the duties of preparing the devices.

=== The Pie Pod ===
The most used and most popular "pie device" on the show, this contraption could launch up to four whipped cream pies at one audience member (sometimes two and on one episode, three). They were set up in a hydraulic chair and covered with a clear plastic tarp, leaving their head exposed. Then the chair, which resembled a barber's chair or an antique-style dentist's chair, would be pumped up until the participant's head was aligned with a target behind them. Summers then asked the audience (or the winning player, in case of a game that sends the loser to the Pie Pod) how many pies (out of 4) should be launched – "4" was the usual answer – and then released them, following a count of three. During the first season, a device called the "Crowning Glory" was suspended over the participant's head. This was a container shaped like a crown that held a small amount of pink slime. Most of the time this was only released if the audience determined that the "victim" flinched during the release of the pies. However, it could be used for any random occasion Marc deemed warranted it, such as it being someone's birthday.

In the second season, the Crowning Glory was removed, but a fifth pie was added; in addition, participants were no longer covered with a smock, and the large lab goggles were replaced with small swimming goggles. (Incidentally, on very early episodes, the Pie Pod could be loaded with up to six pies - but the two outer ones were never launched, and were subsequently removed). Sometimes, in the show's second season, the Wall O' Stuff would result in an audience member "winning" a trip to the Pie Pod (or some other pie device), as heralded by a corny poem such as the following: "Roses are Red, Violets are Blue. A Trip to the Pie Pod is Waiting for You."

On very early episodes, the audience member would not get a plastic tarp to protect their clothes, and/or no goggles, or only got safety glasses that were usually knocked right off with a direct hit. Marc was sent to the Pie Pod at least twice during the show's run. On the first occasion, Marc said a censored word and had to go to the Pie Pod as a result. The second time, after Marc chose the card during the What Would You Do medley, which was to eat a "veggie split", Robin decided the sundae "needed some whipped cream" and therefore sent Marc to the Pie Pod.

One game was played directly at the Pie Pod, where Marc interviewed a member of the studio audience while a 60-second clock counted down. When the audience member thought that they were within 10 seconds of the 60-second target, they were to say "Stop", and for every 10 seconds they were out, one pie would be launched. If the 60 seconds expired, all four pies would be launched.

=== Pie Slide ===
By far the messiest. An audience member was sent to the top of a playground slide which ended up in a large vat filled with hundreds of gallons of whipped cream and a red beach ball made to look like a cherry. Participants would first remove their socks, shoes and other valuables, and go barefoot up the ladder to the top of the slide. Then the victim was usually allowed to choose whether to go head first or feet first, and would then set off down into the vat, following a count of three. Sometimes when the victim chose to go head first, they would get to hold a small video camera which Marc called the "Pie Cam" as they went down the Pie Slide, giving the home viewers a first-person view of the victim going down the Pie Slide.

One memorable "Pie Slide" incident featured a young woman during the "What Would You Do? Medley" segment who opted to ride the Pie Slide headfirst rather than eat a Twinkie with gravy, when it was all over; the woman, laughing hysterically, her entire body covered with cream, openly wished she had chosen to eat the Twinkie with gravy.

Another memorable Pie Slide moment featured Marc having the audience point to someone who they wanted to see go down the Pie Slide. Everyone in the audience pointed to Marc, which meant that Marc had to go down the Pie Slide, head first. In that same episode, Marc's card during the "What Would You Do" Medley said "Pie Slide" and he tried to get out of it by saying that they were out of time. But Robin made him go down the Pie Slide anyway, although he got to go feet first.

The Pie Slide was featured only in the first season, in the second season, it was replaced by the Pie Coaster (see below), which was much less messy.

=== Pie Pendulum ===
A family was selected, with one family member being strapped to a long board with their face hanging over the side. The participant was asked five questions about another family member, with each incorrect answer resulting in the other participating family member turning a crank which lowered the victim's face toward a large pie (a pile of whipped cream in a giant metal bowl). Three incorrect answers resulted in the victim's face landing in the pie; three correct answers resulted in the victim being "saved", and the other participating family member would be "cranked" into the pie face first. This was used only in the first season.

=== Pie in the Sky ===
Two participants were chosen (usually two family members). Three bowls were stacked directly above each participant's head, with the top one containing pink slime (referred to as "pie filling"). The two participants were then asked a series of five questions about another family member standing between the two contraptions; each time a participant missed one, one of three levers was pulled, allowing the slime to be emptied into the bowl underneath the current one. Three incorrect answers resulted in the third lever being pulled, releasing the "pie filling" onto the contestant's head. If after five questions neither participant had been slimed, the family member about whom the questions were being asked was forced to stand under one of the contraptions and get slimed (though this rarely happened). One variation had a contestant trying to complete a stunt in a 30-second time limit, the stunt would be stopped at 10-second intervals to release the pie filling. On more than one occasion, the device malfunctioned, thus releasing the "pie filling" after only two pulls, or not at all after the required three pulls (which the contestant immediately jumped out from underneath and was not slimed).

=== Pie Roulette ===
In this Pie game, which is borrowed from Wild and Crazy Kids, another Woody Fraser/Nickelodeon/Reeves Entertainment production, the chosen participants took turns being seated at a table loaded with a pie. The contestant placed their head in a chin rest on the table. They rolled a die, and had to turn a crank whatever number of times the die showed. At any time the crank was being turned, the device could spring the pie, which would land in the contestant's face. In addition, the "Flinch Factor" (a bucket containing the aforementioned pink "pie filling") was positioned above the contestant's head, if the audience voted that the contestant flinched at any time (whether he was pied or not), the bucket would be released onto their head. On at least one occasion a contestant was slimed with the bucket even though he had not been pied. (On the Wild and Crazy Kids version, this bucket was filled with actual cherry pie filling, and was "reloaded" after each use.)

Woody Fraser would reuse this pie contraption in his later Family Challenge.

=== Pie Wash ===
Appearing in the second season only, this device would have the audience member sit in a large leather chair and be strapped in with a seatbelt, while three nozzles above attempted to spray the audience member with whipped cream while he was being spun around rapidly, before it "cleaned them up" using a rotating car wash styled brush. Its associated poem at the Wall o' Stuff goes as "Roses are Red, Envy is Green. After the Pie Wash, You'll be Squeaky Clean." On one occasion, the Wall o' Stuff card said "We couldn't think of anything to rhyme with Pie Wash, so just go there." The Pie Wash often failed to get whipped cream onto the participant, as the whipped cream had either melted in the contraption (causing it to simply dribble out onto the floor), or the hoses failed to spray it out altogether. On the occasions when it did work, however, the contestant was immersed. As with the Pie Pod, the "Pie Wash" victim was made to wear goggles.

In one famous moment, a contestant was sent to the Pie Wash, but as she rotated, nothing came out of the pipes. While everyone was figuring out what was going on, Marc turned and found that the Pie Pod had gone off with no one in it. Just as Marc and crew went to see what was going on, a large burst of cream suddenly burst out, soaking the girl.

=== Pie Coaster ===
Replacing the Pie Slide for the second season of the show, this was a mini roller coaster which ended with an audience member crashing into an oversized pie which stood on its side. At first the contestant would crash through some paper What Would You Do? banners before crashing into the giant pie. The participant usually got hit multiple times as he rocked back and forth on the final dip, where the pie was located; however, since participants were required to wear a large helmet with a full-face clear shield when on the Pie Coaster, the messiness relative to the other devices was severely limited.

A trip to the Pie Coaster via the Wall O' Stuff would be heralded by one of the two following poems: "You didn't win a car, you didn't win a toaster. You won a free ticket on our famous Pie Coaster." or "We've got a one-track mind, and so will you, a trip down the Pie Coaster on What Would You Do?."

== Other features ==
=== Musical Pies ===
In addition, the show often featured pieing-related variations on games such as Musical chairs, Simon Says, Rock paper scissors, and "One potato, two potato". In "Musical Chairs" (redubbed "Musical Pies"), contestants seated together in a row passed around a cream pie while music played, when the music stopped, the person left holding the pie had to stick it into his or her face, and if the person refused, a family member or friend might be called down to pie him or her. The winner was awarded a "real" pie (i.e. a cherry or apple pie) to take home. This was also featured on Slime Time Live.

=== Family Challenges ===
The second season often featured "family challenge" games which pitted entire families against each other in performing certain activities; the family with the fewest pied members when the game was over would be declared the winner. On other occasions, one family was divided into several teams (ladies vs. men, kids vs. parents, etc.) Most of the time the winning team got to choose from getting a token to the "Wall o' Stuff" for each winning team member, or sending the losing team member(s) to a pie device.

=== Pie-a-Thons ===
A handful of episodes during the first season, promoted as "Pie-a-Thons", were made up entirely of stunts, games and activities featuring pies and also pitted the children in the audience against the adults. In a departure from normal shows, the winners could pie themselves, thus earning points for their team. One popular "Pie-a-Thon" feature was the "Pie Lottery", in which each member of the audience was assigned a number and any person whose number was called would be given the opportunity to pie themselves; on rare occasions, a person who did not wish to pie themselves would get to pie a family member or friend or someone else of their choosing.

At the end of the show, one child and one adult would stand by the Pie Slide and exchange two envelopes repeatedly until a buzzer sounded. At that point, the audience would vote on who should go down the Pie Slide. The winner of the vote went down the pie slide, then opened their envelope. One of the envelopes hid a zero, the other hid either a 50 or a 100. Each participant earned their team the number of points in their envelope (if the winner of the vote had the zero, the other would have to go down the Pie Slide in order to collect the points); usually it would be enough to win the show. On one occasion, the child (a teenage girl) won the vote and got to ride the Pie Slide head first; her envelope hid a 100, thus winning the show for the "kids", her competitor adult (a young man) was given the opportunity to ride the Pie Slide anyway, and ended up with the upper half of his body completely covered in pie.

=== Roving Camera ===
The first season of What Would You Do? also often featured segments taped as the show's crew traversed the Nickelodeon Studios theme park in Orlando searching for participants. The activities in which volunteers participated were sometimes pie-related (i.e. "Do an impression of a cartoon character being hit with a pie", or being given the choice of pieing themselves or someone else of their choosing), but more often involved performing a stunt or a Candid Camera or Punk'd-style "hidden camera" prank.

== Personnel change ==
Robin Marrella left the series in 1993 – due to, according to Summers, a disagreement over pay – but continued to work with Summers on Double Dare (at that time, Family Double Dare). Instead of a permanent replacement, a kid from the audience was picked to be "Co-Host of the Day" for the remainder of the series' run, expanding on the show's audience participation theme. Co-hosts assisted Marc by providing pies and other props for the games and stunts, and also participated in the Wall O'Stuff by operating the lottery by which audience members earned participation. When this outlived its usefulness (the kids were often shy), a chimpanzee named Corey was brought on stage to hand Summers props and supply primate-related jokes through voiceover acting.

== Reruns ==
Reruns aired on Nickelodeon until July 4, 1999, and on Nick GAS from 1999–2002. After cancellation, Nickelodeon decided to go back and redub the ending theme on most of the 1991 episodes with the 1993 one, and add parting gift prizes that never existed before. Only a handful of 1991 episodes retained the original ending theme.

Despite the show's popularity, Summers himself hated hosting the program as he thought it was odd and didn't like doing a Nickelodeon Studios tour show.
