= Double Dare (franchise) =

American game show

- Logo for the 2018 revival
- Also known as: Super Sloppy Double Dare (1987, 1989); Family Double Dare (1988, 1990–93); Double Dare 2000 (2000)
- Genre: Game show
- Created by: Geoffrey Darby; Michael Klinghoffer; Dee LaDuke; Robert Mittenthal; Debby Beece (Family Double Dare)
- Written by: Alan Silberberg (1986–89); Gary DeLena (1990–91); Bobby Lory (1992–93); John Ten Eyck (2000); Gary Lucy (2019); Ben Tritle (2019)
- Directed by: Dana Calderwood (1986–88); Michael Klinghoffer (1986-88); Hugh Martin (1989–91); Lexi Rae (1992–93); Bob Lampel (1992-93); Hal Leigh (2000); Hans van Riet (2018–19)
- Presented by: Marc Summers; Jason Harris; Liza Koshy
- Announcer: Harvey; Doc Holliday; Tiffany Phillips; Marc Summers
- Theme music composer: Edd Kalehoff (1986–93, 2018–19); Rick Witkowski (2000)
- Country of origin: United States
- Original language: English
- No. of episodes: 482 (1986–93); 67 (2000); 61 (2018–19)

Production
- Executive producers: Geoffrey Darby (1986–93); Eileen Braun (2000); Peter Herschko (2018–19); Marc Summers (2018–19); Liza Koshy (2018–19); Josh Silberman (2018–19); Jennifer Mullin (2018–19); Jayson Dinsmore (2018–19); Joni Day (2018–19)
- Producers: Michael Klinghoffer (1986–88); Dana Calderwood (1989); Angelika Bartenbach (1990–93); Marc Summers (1992–93); David Braun (2018–19)
- Production locations: Philadelphia, Pennsylvania (1986–89); New York, New York (1987); Orlando, Florida (1989–93, 2000); Los Angeles, California (2018–19)
- Running time: 22–24 minutes
- Production companies: Nickelodeon Productions; Fremantle (2018–19)

Original release
- Network: Nickelodeon (1986–87, 1990–93, 2000, 2018–19); Syndicated (1988–89); Fox (1988)
- Release: October 6, 1986 – February 7, 1993
- Release: January 22 – November 10, 2000
- Release: June 25, 2018 – December 20, 2019

Double Dare is an American game show in which two teams compete to win cash and prizes by answering trivia questions and completing messy stunts called "physical challenges". It originally ran from 1986 to 1993. A revival ran in 2000, and another revival ran from 2018 to 2019.

Hosted by Marc Summers, the program premiered on Nickelodeon on October 6, 1986, as its first game show. A continuation for syndication premiered on February 22, 1988, revamped as Super Sloppy Double Dare on January 22, 1989. The program also had a short run on Fox as Family Double Dare, airing from April 3 to July 23, 1988. Nickelodeon continued Family Double Dare, premiering a new version on October 6, 1990. The original series ended on February 7, 1993. The series was revived, hosted by Jason Harris, and titled Double Dare 2000; this aired from January 22 to November 10, 2000. A second revival of the series, hosted by Liza Koshy and featuring Summers, aired from June 25, 2018, to December 20, 2019.

Double Dare saw many adjustments in scheduling and titling throughout its run. Almost immediately after its debut, Double Dare had more than tripled viewership for Nickelodeon's afternoon lineup, becoming the most-watched original daily program on cable television. The program was a major success for Nickelodeon, helping to establish the network as a major player in cable television and to revitalize the genre of game shows for children in the 1980s and 1990s. Double Dare remains Nickelodeon's longest-running game show. In 2001, TV Guide ranked it 29th on its list of the 50 Greatest Game Shows. The program has been nominated for two Daytime Emmy Awards and two Kids' Choice Awards and won a CableACE Award in 1989.

== Gameplay ==
=== Main game ===
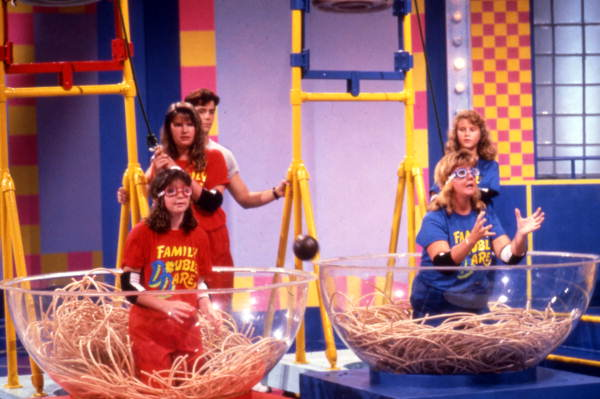
A Family Double Dare toss-up physical challenge showing two contestants trying to catch a "meatball" in a bowl of "spaghetti", 1990

Each team on the original Double Dare and Super Sloppy Double Dare consisted of two children, while teams on Family Double Dare and Double Dare 2000 included two adults and two children. Originally, both teams wore red uniforms, but after Double Dare entered syndication in 1988, one team wore blue uniforms while the other wore red.

Each round begins with a toss-up physical challenge in which both teams compete, with the winning team receiving both initial control of the round, and money for their score. After the toss-up, the host begins asking trivia questions of the team in control. Each correct answer earns a monetary award and allows the team to maintain control, while an incorrect answer or failure to respond within approximately ten seconds turns control over to the opponents. However, the team can dare their opponents to answer the question, doubling its value; in response, the opponents can double dare for quadruple the original value. When the team in control is challenged to a double dare, they have to either answer or compete in a physical challenge. Once a dare or double dare is issued, an incorrect answer or failure to respond within five seconds awards both control and the money at stake to the issuing team. The second round plays the same as the first, with all values doubled. On the original Double Dare and Super Sloppy Double Dare, a question was initially worth $10. On Family Double Dare and Double Dare 2000, a question was initially worth $25. On the 2018 Double Dare, a question was initially worth $50, later 50 points.

After the toss-up at the start of the first round, the host explains the rules as follows:

I'm going to ask you a question, and if you don't know the answer, or think the other team hasn't got a clue, you can dare them to answer it for double the dollars. But, be careful, because they can always double dare you back for four times the amount, and then you either have to answer that question or take the physical challenge.

=== Physical challenges ===
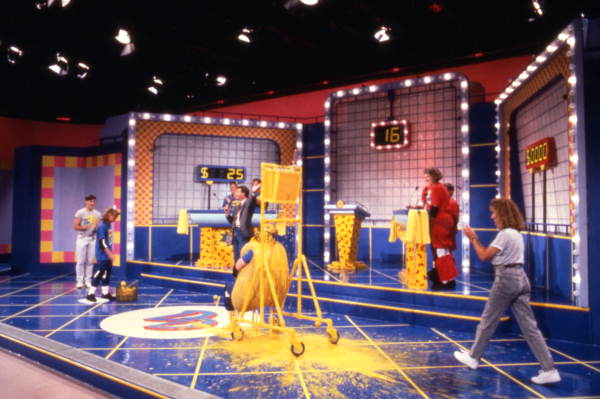
A contestant dressed in a "hot dog bun" is covered in "mustard" after completing a Family Double Dare physical challenge, 1990

Physical challenges are often messy stunts that a team has to perform in a specified time, usually 20 or 30 seconds, although occasionally 10 or 15 seconds. All physical challenges on Double Dare 2000 were 30 seconds in length, unless a time reduction was in play due to the Triple Dare Challenge. The team wins money and retained control for completing the stunt. Otherwise, the money and control pass to their opponents.

Many challenges have involved filling a container past a line with one of a variety of substances including water, uncooked rice, green slime, whipped cream, and milk. Others involve catching a specific number of items before time runs out. For example, during "Pies in the Pants," a contestant has to catch a set number of pies in a pair of oversized clown pants within the specified time limit, while their teammate launches the pies from a foot-operated catapult at the opposite end of the stage.

On the original Double Dare and Super Sloppy Double Dare, both contestants on a team competed in all physical challenges. For the 1988 version of Family Double Dare, all four members of a team competed in the challenges. On the 1990–93 version of Family Double Dare and on Double Dare 2000, two members of a team competed in round one, and all four members competed in round two. All members of a team competed in physical challenges in the first season of the 2018 Double Dare, while most challenges in the second season are for two players.

Double Dare 2000 introduced the Triple Dare Challenge. Available only in round two, this allowed a team to make their physical challenge more difficult, increasing its value by $100, and putting a bonus prize at stake. Difficulties included reducing the time limit, adding an extra item to the stunt, or increasing the overall difficulty of the stunt. The actual modifier was not revealed unless the team decided to accept the challenge. If the team did not complete the challenge successfully, the money, prize, and control went to their opponents.

=== Obstacle course ===
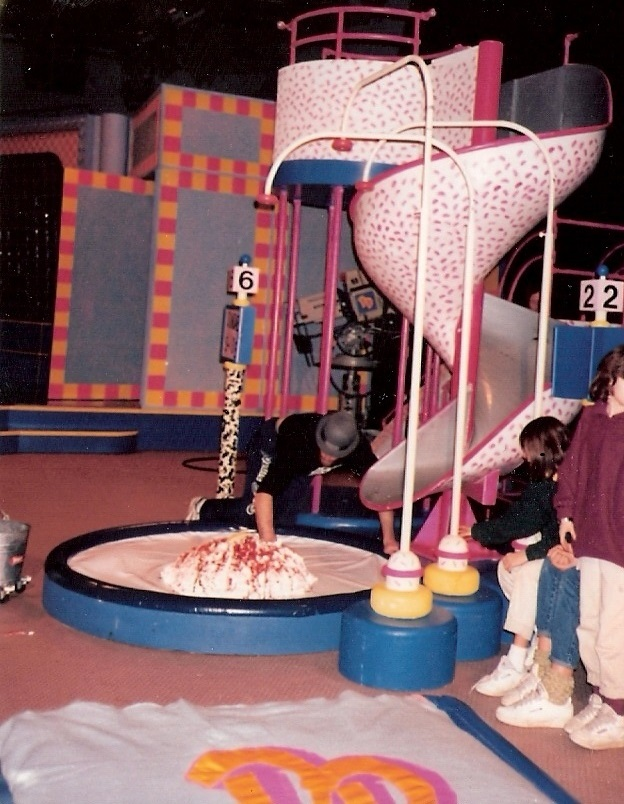
The Sundae Slide being prepared for the Double Dare obstacle course, 1987

The higher-scoring team at the end of round two goes on to the bonus round, the obstacle course (renamed the Slopstacle Course for Double Dare 2000). From the original Double Dare through Double Dare 2000 both teams keep all money earned, regardless of the outcome. Only the winning team on the 2018 version gets to keep their money.

The course consists of eight obstacles that have to be completed within 60 seconds. Each obstacle has an orange flag either at its end or hidden within it. One team member runs the first obstacle, then passes its flag to a partner, who then moves on to the next obstacle. The team continues to alternate in this manner until they have completed the course or until time expires. For safety reasons, team members are given helmets, elbow pads, and knee pads to wear while running the course.

Many obstacles have appeared in the course rotation, often based on body parts, food, and enlarged items found in daily life. Popular elements of the obstacle course have included The One-Ton Human Hamster Wheel, an oversized hamster wheel; Pick It, a giant human nose with a flag hidden inside; The Sundae Slide, a chocolate-covered ramp leading to a playground slide with ice cream at the bottom; and Gum Drop, which required contestants to leap into a giant gumball machine filled with plastic balls and slide out through the dispensing hatch at the bottom.

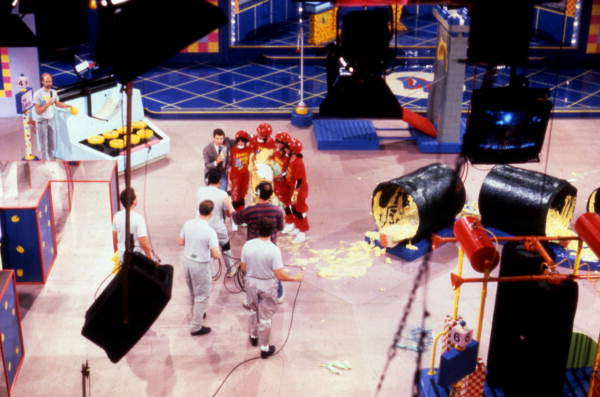
Marc Summers with contestants following a Family Double Dare obstacle course, 1990

Through January 2019, the team would win a prize for each obstacle completed, escalating in value up to a grand prize for completing the entire course. Two-person teams split cash earnings from the front game, and both contestants receive the same physical prize for each obstacle. Prizes have included televisions, concert tickets, encyclopedias, electronics, gift certificates, non-motorized modes of transportation and, on the Fox Family Double Dare, cash. On the original and Super Sloppy versions, the grand prize was usually a vacation or an experience at Space Camp. All eight prizes were usually worth a total of between $3,000 and $4,000, with some episodes featuring a prize package nearing $10,000. On the Fox Family Double Dare, as well as the first season of the Nickelodeon run, the grand prize was a vehicle, making all eight prizes worth between $15,000 and $25,000. Once again, the grand prize was typically a vacation for the second season of Nickelodeon's Family Double Dare, Double Dare 2000 and the first season of the 2018 Double Dare, with grand prize packages on the 2018 version having a value of more than $6,000. With the premiere of the second season of the 2018 revival, the obstacle course was played for $500 cash for each obstacle completed, with a total jackpot of $5,000 for successfully completing the course. Cash values were doubled for the finals game of a tournament series.

According to host Marc Summers, two children were injured on the obstacle course. The first was a boy who had brittle bone disease, which his parents lied about on the application form, resulting in an injury during taping where a bone went through his arm. The second was a boy who slipped on the ladder within the "Sewer Chute" and fell backwards, with Summers initially believing he had snapped his neck and died. The boy's father, an attorney, asked for a television prize as a settlement, to which the Double Dare crew agreed.

== Broadcast and production history ==
=== 1986–1989 ===
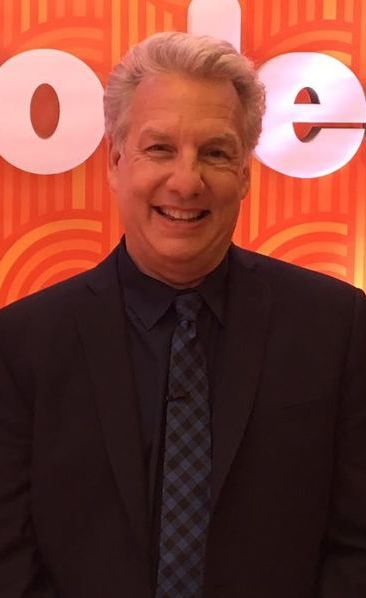
Marc Summers, host of Double Dare from 1986 to 1993

In the mid-1980s, Nickelodeon was approached by production and consulting groups with the idea of doing a game show for children, a first for the network. Nickelodeon conducted focus groups and concluded that children enjoyed watching game shows with adults, but they did not have a game show targeted at their demographic. Dee LaDuke, Robert Mittenthal, Michael Klinghoffer, and Geoffrey Darby worked to develop a new format, basing it on a combination of trivia, truth or dare, and the board game Mouse Trap. The pilot presentation was recorded in May 1986, hosted by Darby. Double Dare was greenlighted, and Nickelodeon announced its premiere on June 5, 1986.

Initial candidates to host the program included Soupy Sales, host of children's variety shows in the 1950s and 1960s, and comedian Dana Carvey. After Nickelodeon determined Sales to be too old for the role, and Carvey was offered a chance to audition for Saturday Night Live, the search for a host continued. Producers viewed over 1,000 applicants from New York or Los Angeles. First attending a tryout in lieu of a friend, and later passing multiple auditions, television warm-up comedian Marc Summers was one of two finalists advancing to a final audition. Each hosted a mock game for Nickelodeon to make an ultimate decision on who would host Double Dare. The producers felt the way Summers ended the game by leading into a commercial break was more professional and he was hired for the position in the first week of September 1986. Because focus groups showed that the audience thought he was more than 10 years younger than he actually was, Summers, then 34 years old, was obligated by Nickelodeon for years to not mention his age publicly.

In need of an announcer, Double Dare producers were made aware of Philadelphia-area radio host John Harvey, known on-air as Harvey, whose Harvey in the Morning program on WIOQ had been canceled months earlier. He accepted the offer to be announcer of the program. Stage assistants also appeared on-camera on Double Dare, initially only assisting in setting up physical challenges and obstacles, but expanding the role as the series continued to sometimes interacting with Summers, demonstrating challenges, and modeling prizes. Robin Marrella and Dave Shikiar were the two permanent stage assistants when the program began.

James Fenhagen and Byron Taylor created the original stage design for Double Dare. The design for the original series' set was inspired by a 1980s Italian postmodern design and architecture group known as the Memphis Group. Glass brick walls and yellow and pink, often in a checkerboard pattern, were prominent aspects of the set design. Highlighted by blue and yellow tile-style floors, Geoffrey Darby gave the direction for the set to look like a natatorium (swimming pool), while Robert Mittenthal feels its inspiration is derived from a bathroom. All the original Double Dare music was composed by Edd Kalehoff.

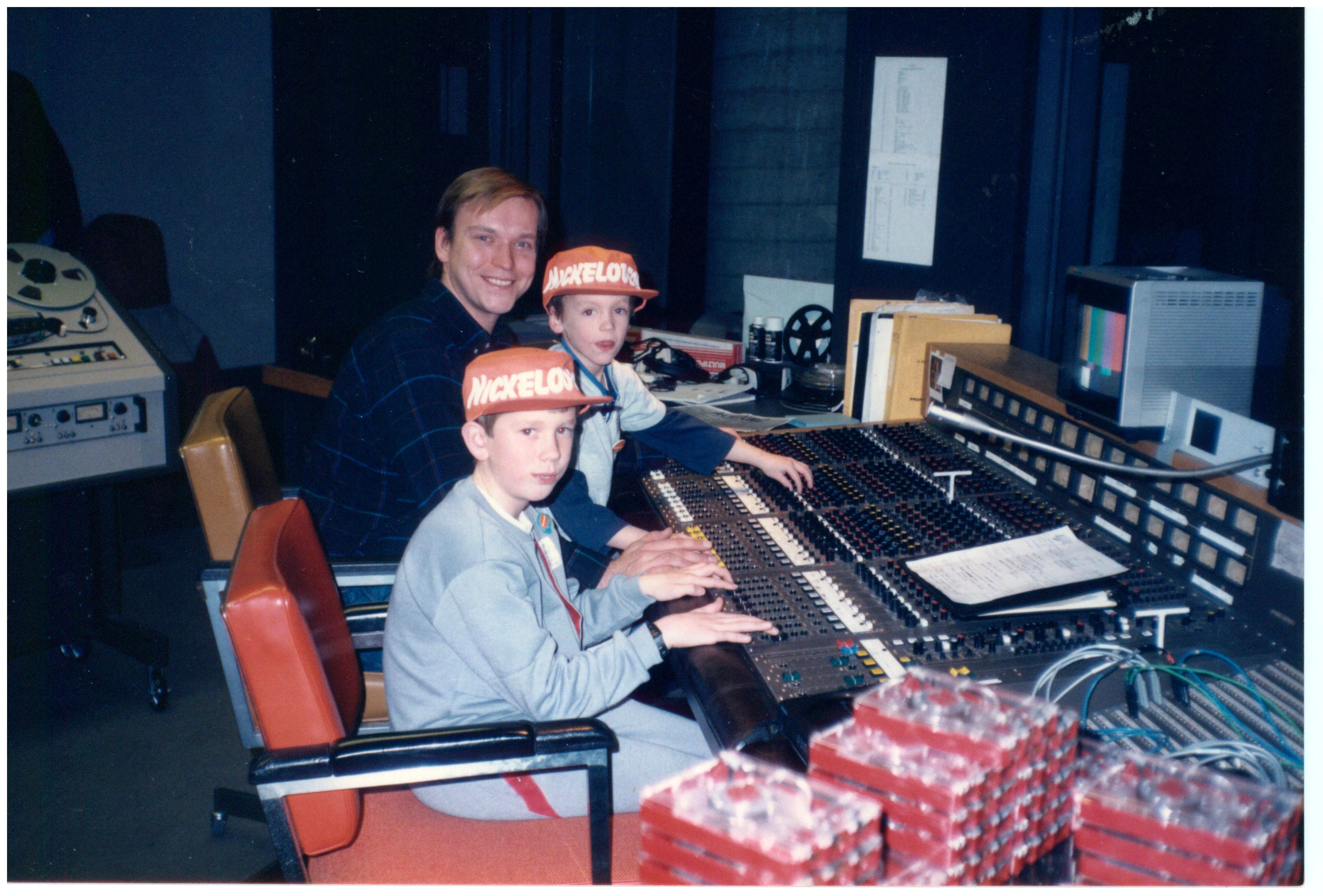
John Krepol mixing the sound for Double Dare at WHYY-TV, 1987

Production originated at the studios of PBS member station WHYY-TV in Philadelphia, Pennsylvania. WHYY offered Nickelodeon their newly opened production wing to use, and Nickelodeon felt Philadelphia was a better location to initially produce Double Dare because of its lower production costs, instead of cities like New York or Los Angeles where national television production is more common. The 65-episode first season was recorded in a 23-day period beginning September 18, 1986. Double Dare premiered on Nickelodeon on October 6, 1986. New episodes aired weekdays at 5:30 p.m. ET during the original series' run on Nickelodeon. After the success of the first 65 episodes, a second 65-episode season was ordered.

A weekend edition titled Super Sloppy Double Dare taped over two weeks in July 1987 and premiered August 2, 1987, airing 26 episodes on Sunday mornings. Super Sloppy Double Dare featured gameplay identical to the original format; however, physical challenges and obstacles were designed to make a bigger mess. Viewers were encouraged to send in a postcard with their contact information and could win a prize if their card was selected, and a team performing a physical challenge completed the stunt successfully. Episodes of Super Sloppy Double Dare were taped at Unitel Studio in New York City before production moved back to WHYY-TV.

In July 1987, pilots hosted by Caitlyn Jenner (formerly Bruce Jenner) were produced by Viacom for two possible versions of Double Dare with adult players: one pairing celebrities with contestants, and another with married couples. Neither concept advanced to series.

By November 1987, Fox announced they had partnered with Viacom to purchase the distribution rights for new episodes of the program in syndication. New episodes of Double Dare aired on independent stations and Fox affiliates beginning on February 22, 1988. There were 130 first-run syndication episodes in 1988.

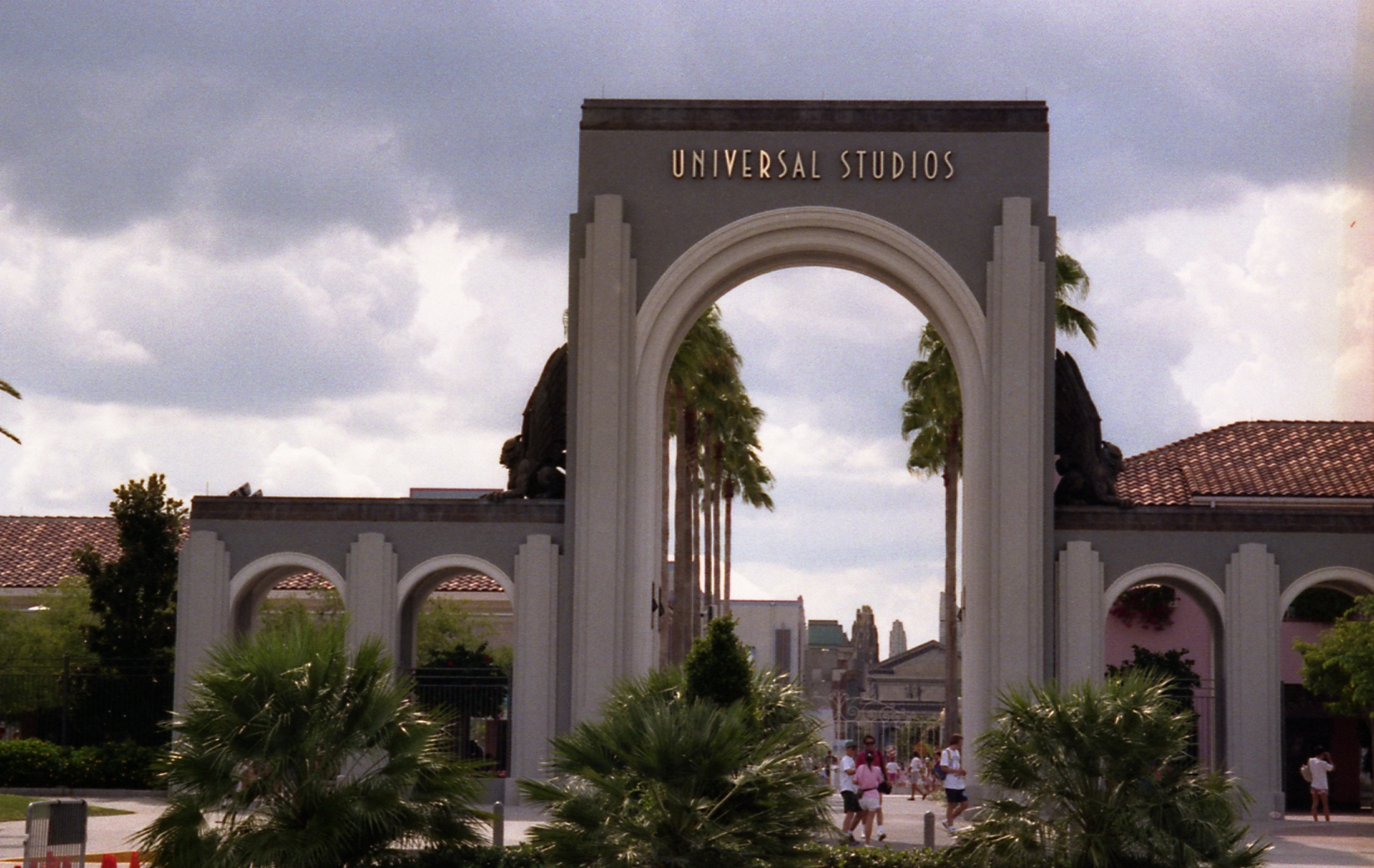
Universal Studios Florida, where Super Sloppy Double Dare was filmed in 1989

A 13-episode Saturday night edition titled Family Double Dare aired on Fox from April 3 to July 23, 1988. Teams on this version consisted of four family members, most often a mother, father, and two children. The budget was increased, and the prize total featured during the obstacle course was larger than that featured on the Nickelodeon series. A further 13 episodes of Family Double Dare were then ordered, but Fox canceled the series shortly before production was to begin because of "creative differences."

On January 5, 1989, production began on a new version of Super Sloppy Double Dare from Philadelphia at WHYY-TV, continuing in syndication. The series premiered on January 22, 1989. The second half of the series was produced at Universal Studios in Orlando, Florida, with production beginning in April 1989. 55 episodes were taped for the first half, and for the second half, 40 were taped, for a total of 95. This version of the show recorded in larger studios with a larger set allowed for a lower level devoted to physical challenges and obstacles with a bigger size and, typically, bigger messes. Many episodes in this part of the series featured unique and offbeat themes that questions, challenges, and sometimes wardrobe would be patterned after. Themes included a Salute to Baseball, Backwards Day, Stupid Hat Day, a Salute to Breakfast, and two Super-Slop-a-Mania episodes featuring wrestlers and personalities from the World Wrestling Federation. Another special episode saw Summers and Harvey each team with a contestant to compete against each other, with Jim J. Bullock taking over hosting duties. By the end of Super Sloppy Double Dare, the program was syndicated to 154 stations. The series left syndication on September 8, 1989.

=== 1990–1993 ===
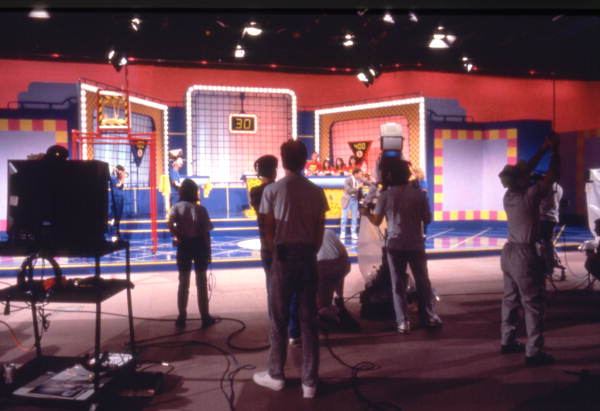
Set of Family Double Dare at Nickelodeon Studios, 1990

Family Double Dare returned to Nickelodeon on August 13, 1990, first airing repeats of the Fox version. A Salute to Double Dare special aired September 2, 1990, with Summers, Harvey, and Marrella highlighting moments from Double Dare, discussing its popularity, and previewing the upcoming Family Double Dare. Nickelodeon launched its own version of Family Double Dare on weekends beginning October 6, 1990. Nickelodeon produced the series at the newly opened Nickelodeon Studios on the Universal Studios Florida grounds in Orlando. Production began in July 1990 and ended on July 24, 1992, with 80 episodes taped over two seasons. Between the production cycles of Family Double Dare, two special episodes of Double Dare were recorded on February 6–7, 1992: NBA All-Star Double Dare with National Basketball Association alumni and Super Special Double Dare with members of the casts of Clarissa Explains It All and Welcome Freshmen.

Jaime Bojanowski and Chris Miles joined Robin Marrella as stage assistants for Family Double Dare, replacing Dave Shikiar who left the series between the ending of Super Sloppy Double Dare in 1989 and the beginning of Family Double Dare in 1990 to pursue production opportunities on other programs like The Home Show and Wild & Crazy Kids. In order to spend time with his wife and his newborn son Caleb, Harvey did not announce the last season of Family Double Dare in 1992. He was replaced as announcer by Doc Holliday, an Orlando-area radio host on WXXL's Doc & Johnny in the Morning. Harvey made a cameo appearance on the final episode of the season and the series.

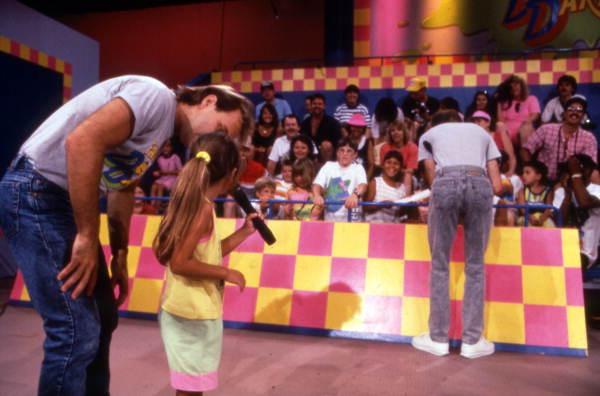
Family Double Dare audience at Nickelodeon Studios, 1990

Family Double Dare concluded on February 7, 1993, with a one-hour Tournament of Champions episode. The episode featured a "brains vs. brawn" mini-tournament where the two families from the final season who answered the most questions correctly played against each other, and the two families from the final season with the fastest obstacle course times played against each other. The winners of those games competed to determine the 1993 Family Double Dare champions. Physical challenges from Double Dare appeared on Nickelodeon All-Star Challenge, a three-part special combining elements from many of Nickelodeon's game shows, airing on October 3, 1994.

Repeats of the original Double Dare continued to air on Nickelodeon until March 15, 1991, and returned to Nickelodeon's schedule again from June 12 to September 30, 1994. Repeats of Family Double Dare remained on the Nickelodeon schedule until January 31, 1999. At this time, development began for the revival that would become Double Dare 2000.

Double Dare has spawned versions in foreign countries throughout the world, including: Canada, the United Kingdom, Australia, The Netherlands, Israel, Germany, India, and Brazil. Six episodes of the Australian version (produced by Australia's Network Ten) recorded for American consumption, one featuring an American team competing against an Australian team, aired on Nickelodeon during a special marathon on September 3, 1990. Repeats of all versions of Double Dare aired in various cycles on Nick GAS from the network's inception in 1999 until its closure in 2009. From 2011 to 2019, Double Dare was incorporated into the branding of TeenNick's classic Nickelodeon blocks The '90s Are All That, and its successor, The Splat (later known as NickSplat and NickRewind). Episodes of Double Dare have occasionally aired in these blocks.

=== Double Dare 2000 ===
On December 20, 1999, Nickelodeon announced a revival of the original Double Dare show, titled Double Dare 2000. Production began on January 5, 2000, and the show broadcast its first episode later that same month on January 22, 2000, now hosted by Jason Harris with Tiffany Phillips as announcer. Additional episodes were taped in July of the same year. Eileen Braun, who worked on the original Double Dare as a production assistant and a production coordinator, was the executive producer for Double Dare 2000. Marc Summers advised on production as an executive consultant. Jeffrey Lamar, Tia Marie Schroeder and Will Finley worked on Double Dare 2000 as stage assistants.

Double Dare 2000 followed the Family Double Dare format with a revamped set and bigger physical challenges. It also featured the new Triple Dare Challenge option in round two, and referred to the obstacle course as the Slopstacle Course. In association with Sony and National Mobile Television, five episodes of Double Dare 2000 were produced in high-definition with a 16:9 aspect ratio. The episodes were broadcast in a 4:3 letterboxed format as Nickelodeon did not broadcast in high-definition until 2008. The music for Double Dare 2000, a Surf Rock style remix of the original soundtrack, was composed by former Crack the Sky guitarist Rick Witkowski. Byron Taylor again served as set designer. The series concluded on November 10, 2000. Repeats remained on the Nickelodeon schedule until July 29, 2001.

=== 2012–2016 ===
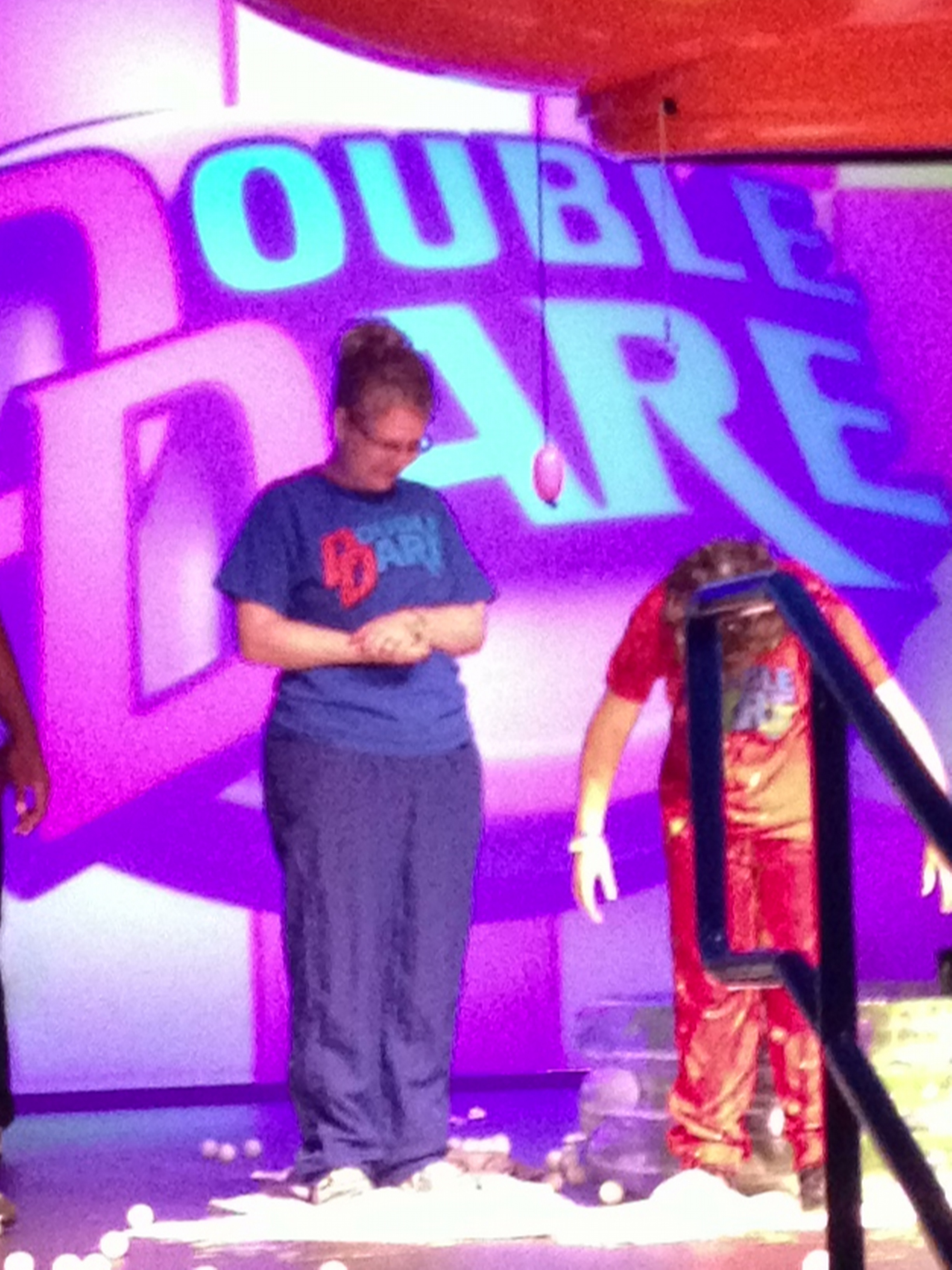
Double Dare stage show at Nickelodeon Suites Resort, 2013

Beginning May 21, 2012, Nickelodeon Suites Resort in Orlando produced Double Dare as a nightly live stage presentation, Double Dare Live. As part of the Studio Nick feature of the hotel, shows were performed each night exclusively for the resort's guests. The show featured elements and updates from the various versions of Double Dare, including remixed music, physical challenges and an obstacle course similar to the TV show. Like the most recent formats of the program, eight contestants were selected to participate for the game-playing teams, while additional audience members played other physical challenges throughout the program. The production continued until Nickelodeon Suites Resort Orlando rebranded as a Holiday Inn Resort on June 1, 2016. A scaled-down version of Double Dare Live, called Double Dare Challenge, has been presented at Nickelodeon Universe in Mall of America in seasonal cycles since 2016.

On July 22, 2016, special live editions of Double Dare, produced by Nickelodeon and The Splat with original host Marc Summers, took place at the Fluxx nightclub during San Diego Comic-Con 2016. The event was live streamed on The Splat's Facebook page and included in the later anniversary special. The week of July 25, 2016, The Splat aired a Double Dare-themed week featuring episodes and moments from the series' history and included edited versions of the Comic-Con games. These events marked Summers' first Nickelodeon-sponsored involvement with the brand since Double Dare 2000.

=== 2018 version ===
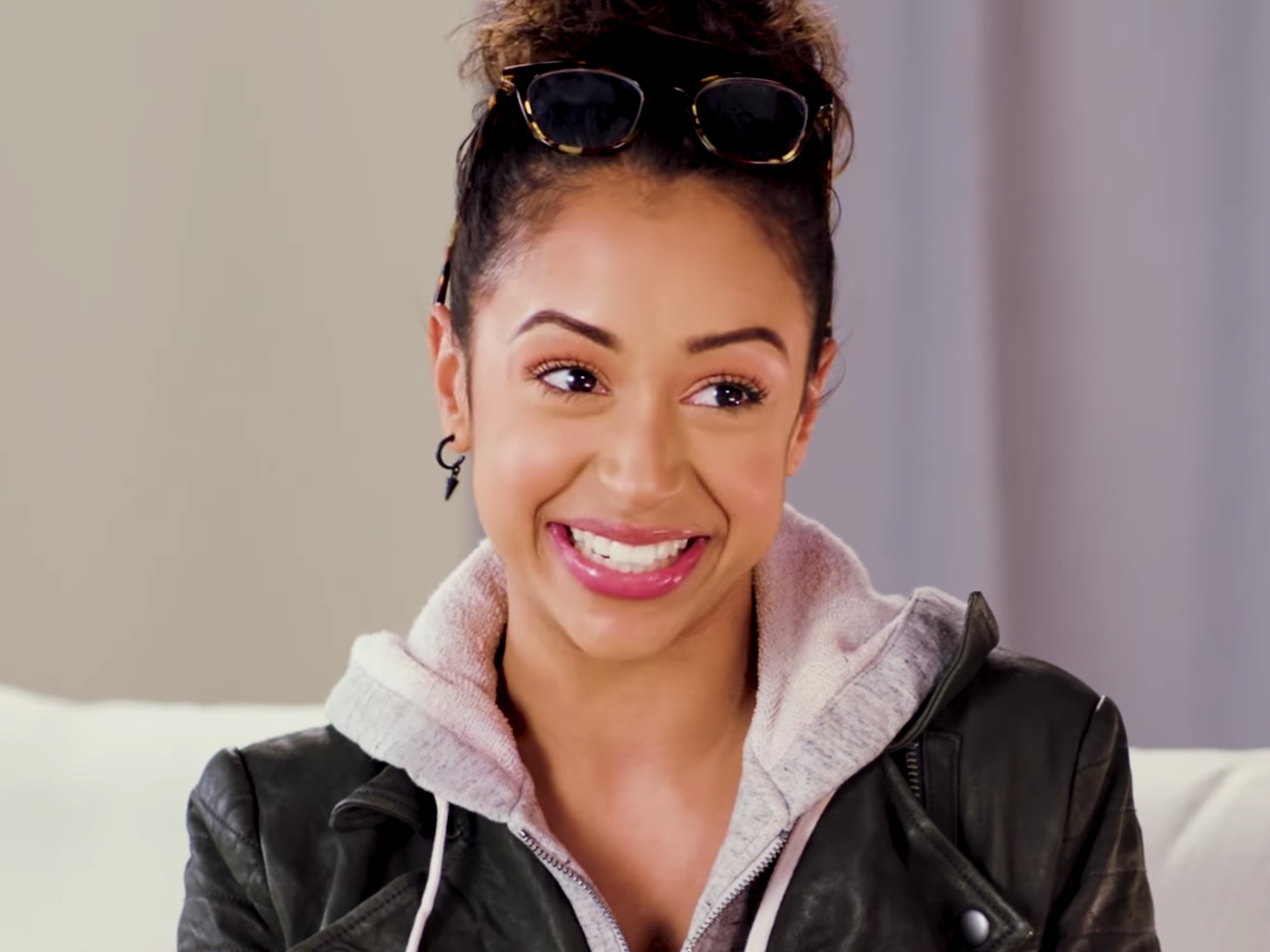
Liza Koshy, host of Double Dare from 2018 to 2019

A half-hour special presentation, celebrating the 30th anniversary of the show's premiere, the Double Dare Reunion Special, aired on November 23, 2016, on Nick at Nite, with an encore airing on The Splat. The special included vintage clips, behind-the-scenes footage, and a new game recorded at San Diego Comic-Con 2016 played by cast members from All That. Summers, announcer Harvey, and stage assistant Robin Russo (née Marrella) appeared in the special. 1.126 million viewers watched the special on Nick at Nite, outperforming all other shows on the network for the evening, and finishing as the third-most viewed of all non-sports original cable telecasts among viewers ages 18 to 34 for that day.

In 2017, Summers stated that, due to the success of the special, he was in negotiations to return to Double Dare in some form with Nickelodeon. News outlets reported in March 2018 that Nickelodeon was producing a new series of Blue's Clues, and was in negotiations to reboot Clarissa Explains It All, two shows originally made by the network in the 1990s. Upon learning of these developments, and inspired by the success of other contemporary television revivals like Will & Grace, Summers emailed Nickelodeon executives to ask if he was going to be the person to receive "the next phone call."

On April 25, 2018, Nickelodeon announced a new version of Double Dare, which is the second revival of the show. The network ordered 40 episodes that recorded in Los Angeles at CBS Studio Center throughout June 2018. The series premiered on June 25, airing weeknights. Actress and television/internet personality Liza Koshy hosted the series. Original host Marc Summers also appeared on the series in an on-camera role. Along with performing traditional duties of an announcer, Summers provided commentary on the show's physical challenges and helped introduce elements and transition the game. Summers was also one of the show's executive producers. Fremantle produced the series on behalf of Nickelodeon.

The set, designed by James Pearse Connelly, bore a heavy resemblance to the original set used in the 1980s. Updates included using digital screens for displays and decoration, enhanced lighting, and a dedicated space for the obstacle course, though timing and scoring uses emulation of the original vane display-type numerals. Members of the "challenge team" also appeared as stage assistants, including Eric Pierce, Michelle Kallman, James Michael Ryan Jr., and Stad St. Fleur. Edd Kalehoff remixed and re-composed the original theme song and soundtrack for this version.

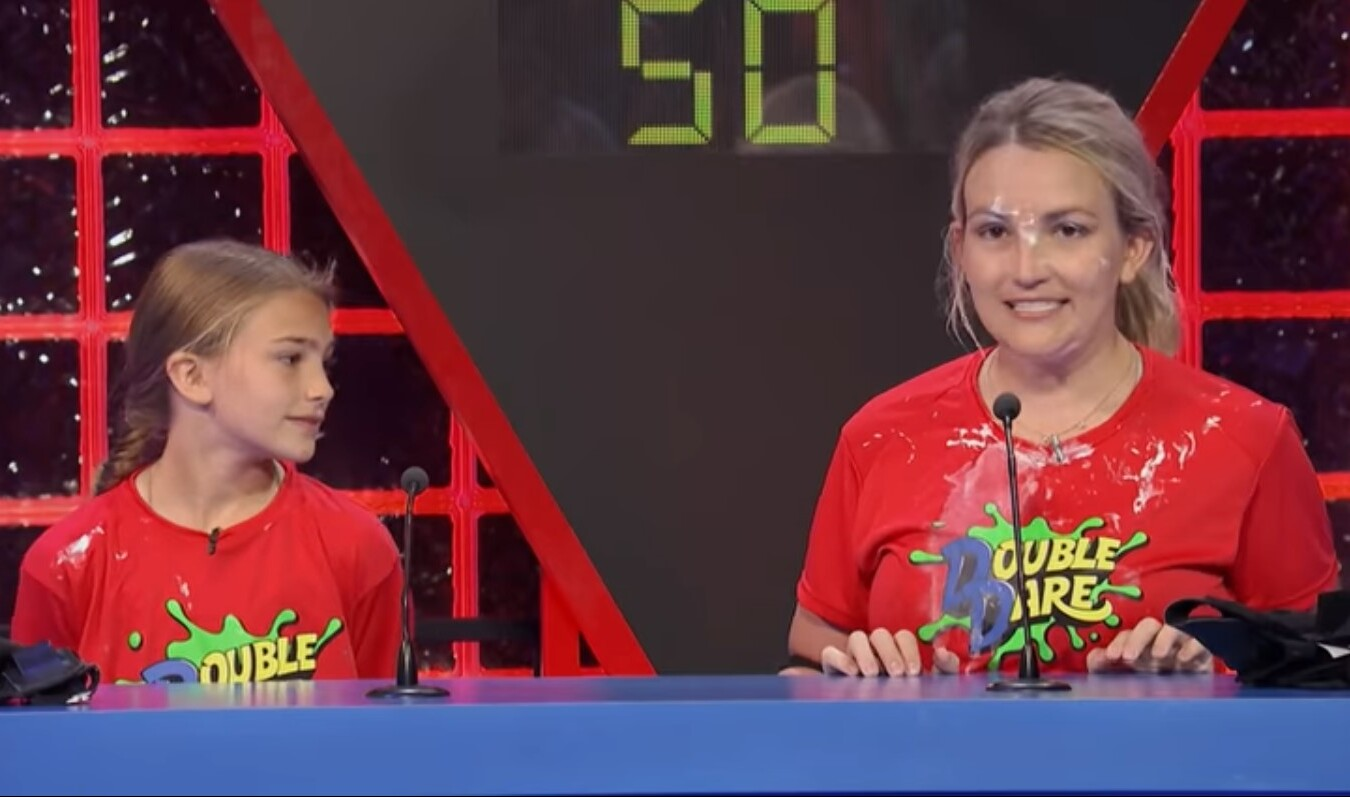
Jamie Lynn Spears and her daughter competing on Double Dare, 2019

Episodes broadcast predominantly featured teams of two children competing, but some episodes have participation from teams of one child and one adult family member. An episode also aired with teams of three siblings, and one with teams of two children with two adult family members. Some episodes featured celebrity participants, such as actors from past Nickelodeon series competing, including All That's Jamie Lynn Spears and Josh Server. The 2018 Kids' Choice Sports, which aired on July 20, 2018, culminated with host and basketball player Chris Paul competing against Olympic swimmer Michael Phelps in the Double Dare obstacle course, presented by Liza Koshy and Marc Summers. Because Koshy had difficulty with her voice during the taping of an episode, Summers filled in as host for the second half of a show, which aired on July 26. The first cycle of season one, airing 24 half-hour episodes, concluded on July 27. Episodes resumed airing on September 30, with weekly airings, culminating with a special 60-minute episode featuring Kenan & Kel stars Kenan Thompson and Kel Mitchell aired on November 21. The final episode of season one aired on February 1, 2019.

In celebration of Super Bowl LIII, a special 45-minute episode featuring stars of Nickelodeon comedy Cousins for Life and NFL players was recorded on January 31, 2019, at the Georgia World Congress Center in Atlanta, as part of the Super Bowl Experience. The episode was simulcast on Nickelodeon, TeenNick, and Nicktoons on February 3, the same day Super Bowl LIII was held.

In January 2019, casting began for a second season of Double Dare. Filming of season two began on February 27 and ran through early March. The season premiered on March 11, with a new tournament format offering cash prizes in the obstacle course. Two teams of four children compete in the first episode, with the winning team splitting up into four individual teams, where each child is paired up with a celebrity. The winning teams from these episodes play against each other in the fourth and final episode of the tournament. The premiere week featured the Kids' Choice Awards Tournament, teaming kids with nominees of the 2019 awards. WWE Superstars Week aired the week of April 22, teaming kids with wrestlers in WWE. SpongeBob Week aired the week of July 8, celebrating the 20th anniversary of SpongeBob SquarePants. Halloween Week aired the week of October 21, celebrating Halloween. The Holiday Tournament aired in four weekly installments, beginning November 29. On August 31, 2019, Summers announced that Double Dare would not be renewed for a third season. The series concluded with the finals of the Holiday Tournament, which aired on December 20, 2019.

=== 2021–present ===
On October 29, 2021, Summers hosted a reunion special streamed by Red Tail Entertainment's Double Dare Live. Titled Double Dare Live at 35, the Facebook special featured Harvey, Robin Russo, Jason Harris, and other cast members, crew and contestants from Double Dare's runs discussing their experiences with the program.

The Life and Slimes of Marc Summers premiered off-Broadway on February 22, 2024, featuring a replica of the Double Dare set and audience members competing in stunts from the program. Robin Russo's daughter Casey Rae Russo served as the show's stage assistant.

== Reception and achievements ==
=== Ratings and impact ===
Within a month of its premiere, Double Dare had more than tripled viewership for Nickelodeon's afternoon schedule becoming the highest-rated original, daily program on cable. During Double Dare's first year, the program averaged a 3.0 household Nielsen rating, with over 1 million households tuned in each week. On its February 1988 debut in syndication, the program averaged a 5.4 household Nielsen rating and a 15.4 rating among children ages 2 to 11, and was the second-highest rated syndicated program in that demographic. By January 1989, Double Dare averaged a 3.1 household Nielsen rating. The special Sunday premiere episode of Family Double Dare on Fox on April 3, 1988, scored a 4.0 household Nielsen rating, finishing fifth out of 10 programs broadcast on Fox that week helping to give Fox's Sunday night schedule its highest ratings to that point.

When Double Dare 2000 premiered in January 2000, episodes in its first two weeks averaged household Nielsen ratings of up to 3.0, being viewed by up to 2.7 million households, and finishing in the top 25 basic cable programs each week. Double Dare 2000 often won its time slot in viewership among children ages 2 to 11.

The June premiere of the 2018 revival was watched by 1.843 million viewers, outperforming all other shows on Nickelodeon for the day, finishing as the highest-rated broadcast for teenagers ages 12 to 17. Double Dare's premiere was Nickelodeon's most-viewed series launch among adults 18 to 49 in more than five years. By the end of its second week, viewership for new episodes hovered around one million overall viewers.

At its peak, Double Dare was the highest-rated, live-action show for children ages 8 to 15. The show was also popular with college students, with many schools offering Double Dare fan clubs. Half of Nickelodeon's operating profit in 1988 was due to the success of Double Dare and its syndication. On the show's success, then-senior vice-president of Nickelodeon programming Herb Scannell said that Double Dare was like "having a hit record your first time out. Double Dare put Nick on the map."

Double Dare revitalized interest in the concept of a game show for children. Less than a year after the program launched, NBC had premiered I'm Telling!, Lorimar Television had announced plans for Fun House, and Nickelodeon's Finders Keepers began airing—all shows based on competition between teams of children. During Double Dare's first year on television, junior versions of established game shows including Hollywood Squares and The Cross-Wits were developed for syndication, but ultimately were not produced. Game show executive and producer Bob Boden noted that Double Dare "allowed kids to get dirty and have a good time in ways that really were not acceptable before that show". Double Dare remains the longest-running game show produced by Nickelodeon.

As Double Dare grew messier, a green slime substance became more commonly used in physical challenges and obstacles. Slime was originally introduced on another Nickelodeon program, You Can't Do That on Television. Double Dare's high viewership led to greater visibility for Nickelodeon's association with slime and saw it featured in promotions for the network in the late 1980s. The substance proliferated further, including annual slimings on the Kids' Choice Awards, a slime geyser at Nickelodeon Studios, and slime-based segments on other game shows including Wild & Crazy Kids and Figure It Out. The relationship between Nickelodeon and slime still lasts on the network.

=== Critical reception ===
Reviews of the show were often favorable, noting it was fun entertainment for the family. After Double Dare premiered, Kenneth R. Clark, media writer for the Chicago Tribune, observed that when contestants "squeal and make faces, it is somehow natural, wholesome and infectious," and said, "Double Dare is so refreshing." Noel Holston of the Minneapolis Star and Tribune wrote that "kids and game shows, when you think about it, go together like hot fudge and ice cream". The Orange County Register's Ellen T. Klein said Double Dare is "such fast-paced, furious and messy fun" and rated the show as "good". In 1988, television critic Ken Tucker cited the interaction between, and the performances of host Marc Summers and announcer Harvey as "the not-so-secret ingredients in the show's success in drawing adult, as well as youthful, viewers".

Some criticism came from the feeling that the program was not educational. Others were concerned about food waste like beans and eggs in physical challenges and obstacles. In a "Cheers and Jeers" section in 1988, TV Guide gave "jeers" to Double Dare for "daring to push beyond the limits of good taste," saying it was "gross and insulting to watch." In 1989, television and film critic Jeffrey Lyons wrote that he "wouldn't dream of proclaiming that Super Sloppy Double Dare is good for your child. But what's wrong with watching an admittedly dumb—but hilarious—program just for fun?"

Andrea Graham wrote for Common Sense Media that revival series Double Dare 2000 is a "fun, action-filled game show that families can watch together – amid all the slime are some good messages about family togetherness". Original host and executive consultant for Double Dare 2000 Marc Summers said that "there were issues" with the revival. In an interview with AfterBuzz TV, he said that he felt the length of the Triple Dare Challenge took away from the game and that "if we would have done it the way we originally did it, we would have been fine, but unfortunately, it didn't happen".

The 2018 revival of Double Dare premiered to positive reviews, particularly for host Liza Koshy. Reality Blurred's Andy Dehnart said that the reboot "did an excellent job of balancing the old and new," and praised the combination of Koshy and Marc Summers, saying she "can absolutely hold her own as host," and "her rapport with [Summers] felt natural and playful." Joel Keller of the New York Post's Decider observed that "the show belongs to Koshy, who ad-libs well and makes the kids feel at ease," and gave Double Dare a favorable "stream it" rating.

Double Dare was nominated for a CableACE Award in the Game Show Special or Series category at the 1989 and 1993 ceremonies, winning the award in 1989, but losing to MTV's Lip Service in 1993. Dana Calderwood was nominated for a Daytime Emmy Award for Outstanding Directing in a Children's Series in 1989. Nickelodeon was nominated for a 1988 Golden ACE award, cable's then-highest programming honor, for its "pro-social television," including Double Dare by name. In January 2001, TV Guide ranked the show number 29 on its list of 50 Greatest Game Shows. At the 2019 Kids' Choice Awards, Double Dare was nominated in the category of Favorite Reality Show, and Liza Koshy and Marc Summers were nominated as a duo in the category of Favorite TV Host. Double Dare was honored at the 47th Daytime Emmy Awards in 2020 with an Emmy nomination for Outstanding Game Show.

== Other media ==
=== Portrayals and parodies ===
Double Dare has been featured in a number of notable visual media since its premiere, often with one or more characters participating as contestants in homages to the series. On "Double Dare", a 2016 episode of the 1980s-set sitcom The Goldbergs, Adam Goldberg (Sean Giambrone) tries to find the perfect partner to audition to be a contestant on Double Dare. After rejecting his friend Emmy Mirsky (Stephanie Katherine Grant), he eventually runs through a mock obstacle course at a tryout with his grandfather Albert "Pops" Solomon (George Segal). Neither are selected to take part in the program. Benjamin Bauman and Amy Gross, real-life friends of series' creator Adam F. Goldberg who appeared as contestants on Double Dare in 1988, cameo as producers of the show. In November 2013, an episode in season one of Nickelodeon's Sanjay and Craig titled "Trouble Dare" features the titular characters (voiced by Maulik Pancholy and Chris Hardwick), along with Sanjay's mother and father (voiced by Grey Griffin and Kunal Nayyar), leaving their home after a bug infestation. After asking Remington Tufflips (voiced by Chris D'Elia) to stay in his trailer and finding that the Dickson family is already occupying it, Tufflips decides which family can stay through a game of Family Double Dare hosted by himself. Harvey (voiced by himself) is concerned with how Tufflips is running the game until Marc Summers (voiced by himself) appears and declares Sanjay's family the winners of a night's sleep inside the Pick It obstacle. Another Family Double Dare game is seen in the music video for rock band Good Charlotte's 2011 single "Last Night." The video shows an abridged game of Family Double Dare, going through questions, physical challenges, and the obstacle course. Marc Summers appears as himself, guitarist Benji Madden appears as Harvey, and band members play contestants and stage assistants. In July 2020, an episode in season four of Nickelodeon's The Loud House aired titled "How Double Dare You!" in which the Loud family siblings attempt to get on Double Dare.

Double Dare has also been subject to parodies and spoofs in various forms. The October 1988 issue of Mad has a spoof of Double Dare called "Double Damp". Marc Summers and Harvey are lampooned as "Muck Slummers" and "Hardly". The piece mocked the program's use of food products, the dangerous nature of some stunts, and the similarity to game show Beat the Clock. Both Summers and Harvey consider being parodied in Mad a high point in their careers. A 2015 episode of the truTV sketch comedy series Friends of the People titled "Double Dare" guest stars Marc Summers as himself, hosting "banned" moments from Double Dare. Sketches include a contestant exploding, and another being stuck permanently inside an obstacle. "March Dadness," a 2012 episode of The Cleveland Show, features a flashback to a Family Double Dare-like program called Dare Squared. A young Cleveland Brown (voiced by Mike Henry) has difficulty finding an orange flag in an oversized stack of pancakes at the end of the program's obstacle course. Marc Summers voices the frustrated host. Also, in a 2017 episode of Billy on the Street, host Billy Eichner led guest Keegan-Michael Key through an obstacle course with gun law themes titled Super Sloppy Semi-Automatic Double Dare. Eichner has cited Double Dare as a favorite show of his.

=== Merchandise and promotions ===
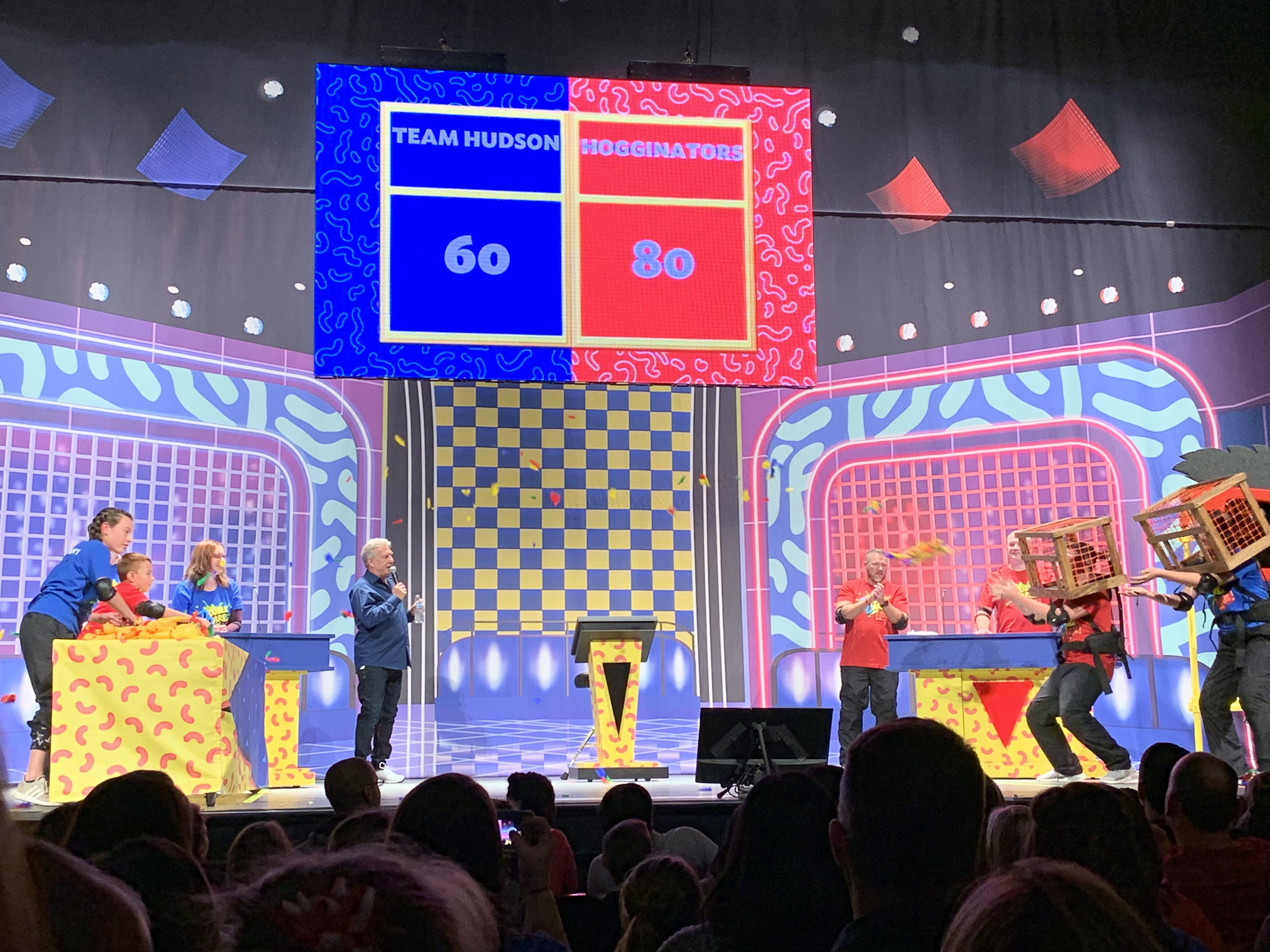
Marc Summers hosting a physical challenge on the Double Dare live tour in Cleveland, 2018

Reebok has been a major sponsor of Double Dare throughout its run. Every contestant and stage crew member wore a pair of the company's shoes. Additional corporate sponsorships and tie-ins were proposed, including Casio putting their logo on the stage clock, and a Double Dare-branded breakfast cereal, but Nickelodeon declined the offers.

From 1987 to 1995, various Double Dare live tours visited venues around the United States. Featuring a format similar to the TV show wherein members of a live local audience could participate, the tour would later incorporate aspects of What Would You Do?, another show hosted by Marc Summers for Nickelodeon. Some events in these tours sold-out arenas they were held in, with attendance of more than 20,000 spectators. The tours and events resumed in 2000 to promote Double Dare 2000. Beginning October 30, 2018, a version of Double Dare once again began touring nationwide. Marc Summers served as host, with previous Double Dare personality Robin Russo appearing as well. The tour ran through the end of 2019.

Double Dare's lasting popularity has led to a variety of products being made available. Pressman Toy Corporation released two traditional board games based on the show: The Double Dare home game was released in September 1987 and Wet 'N Wild Double Dare was released in March 1989. Another board game titled Double Dare: The Game was manufactured by Mattel in 2001. GameTek published a PC game in 1988, and a video game for the Nintendo Entertainment System in 1990 based on the program. Stages based on Double Dare are playable in the 2020 racing game Nickelodeon Kart Racers 2: Grand Prix, and as a downloadable content update in the 2021 fighting game Nickelodeon All-Star Brawl. Containing facts about the show, along with trivia and activities to host a home version of the game, two editions of The Double Dare Game Book were released by Parachute Press in 1988 and 1989. Based on substances referenced on Double Dare and Double Dare 2000, Mattel and Jakks Pacific manufactured a series of toy slimes called Gak and Goooze. Other toys, apparel, lunchboxes, and school supplies have been sold featuring the show's logo and art.

Double Dare was heavily featured in the summer 2016 "Remember When" promotion at New York concept store STORY. Their partnership with Nickelodeon offered exclusive in-store products like Double Dare T-shirts and other goods designed in the style of the program's themes. Patrons at STORY could also participate in Double Dare experiences, like running the One-Ton Human Hamster Wheel obstacle. As well, other Double Dare-inspired products available in-store, including Keds shoes and Stance socks, were offered online through retail partner Neiman Marcus.

Four collections of Double Dare highlights and special features were released on home video by Kids Klassics on October 1, 1988,— Double Dare: The Inside Scoop and Double Dare: The Messiest Moments. On October 17, 1989, a home party guide titled How to Throw a Double Dare Party was released by Elektra Video. Sony Wonder released Double Dare: Super Sloppiest Moments on May 31, 1994.

Collections of episodes of the original Super Sloppy Double Dare and versions of Family Double Dare were made available for purchase via digital distribution on Amazon Prime Video and the iTunes Store throughout 2013. A DVD titled Nickelodeon Games and Sports: All-Star Collection, released by Nickelodeon for Amazon.com on April 27, 2015, features an episode of the original Super Sloppy Double Dare and Family Double Dare. Added at launch in August 2018, select episodes of Double Dare 2000 were available to view on the now defunct NickSplat channel on Otter Media's VRV streaming service. 246 episodes from the first three years of the original Double Dare were added to the now defunct NickHits channel, available on Prime Video and Apple TV, in December 2019, and later added to Paramount+ (formerly CBS All Access) in January 2021. Recent versions were added to channels on Paramount Global's over-the-top streaming television service Pluto TV.

Episodes of the 2018 version of Double Dare are available for purchase through many online video retailers, sold individually and in multi-episode volumes. The first season of the 2018 version was added to Paramount+ in March 2021, with the second season being added in December of that same year. In August 2018, a Double Dare game was released on Facebook Messenger, allowing users to play against friends or other Messenger users in a turn-based version of the program.

In 2026, in commemoration of Double Dare's 40th anniversary, Summers announced that he would host an unofficial event at City Winery Philadelphia, titled Marc Summers & Friends' 40 Year Double Dare Reunion. The October 4, 2026 show would co-star announcer Harvey, assistant Russo (nee Marella), and several other stars and producers from the original show. Summers also promised to run through the audience of approximately 300 fans, looking for volunteers to help demonstrate some of the show's most popular physical challenges. When the show's limited capacity sold out, Summers announced that in lieu of additional live performances, the sole reunion event would be filmed for a limited-run pay-per-view stream, available through the event's website from October 31 through December 31 of that year.
