= Spirit of Sacramento (boat) =

Beached Ship

Spirit of Sacramento, also known as the Grand Romance, formerly known as the Putah, the Mansion Belle, the Chicu San and unofficially known as the "Old Spirit of Sacramento", is a snagboat famous for its appearance in the 1955 film Blood Alley starring John Wayne. After a devastating fire in 1996, the boat fell into disrepair and now sits beached on the banks of the Sacramento River.

== Service as the Putah, Chicu San and Mansion Belle ==
Built for the U.S. Army Corps of Engineers in 1942 by the Berkeley Steel Construction Company and commissioned as the Putah, the vessel served as a snagboat, clearing rivers from obstruction. It was in this capacity the Putah served until it was purchased by John Wayne in 1954 to serve as the Chicu San in the then-upcoming film Blood Alley, as based on the novel by Sidney Fleischman.

After the film released in 1955, the Putah was sold to Sacramento businessman Frank Parisi, who renamed the Putah to the Mansion Belle and operated it as a pleasure boat for river cruises within the Sacramento Delta. In 1957, the Mansion Belle collided with a cottage and significantly damaged its propeller blades, losing 10 before being repaired. In 1964, the Mansion Belle relocated to Marina Del Rey, where it was sold to Bob Morris, who operated the ship as a party boat for hire.

== Service as the Spirit of Sacramento and eventual abandonment ==
Very little is known about the whereabouts of the Mansion Belle during the 1970s and 1980s. In 1991, the Mansion Belle was purchased by Channel Star Excursions, who renamed it to the Spirit of Sacramento and used it for their successful dinner cruise service. After five years of operation, on February 3, 1996, an onboard fire destroyed the Spirit of Sacramento down to the waterline.

After the fire, the Spirit of Sacramento was purchased by William Barker, who sought to rebuild the ship and utilize it for a dinner cruise service. After consistent issues with vandalism and theft, the Spirit of Sacramento was abandoned in its dock. In 2006, members of the Sacramento Yacht Club expressed concern that the Spirit of Sacramento was in danger of breaking its mooring and floating downriver, potentially destroying or damaging other vessels.

In 2007, despite efforts by Barker to restore the Spirit, an investigation by the State of California found that the ship was partially submerged and no longer in seaworthy condition. After a lack of response from Barker, a lawsuit to remove the Spirit of Sacramento was filed. In 2008, Barker moved the Spirit of Sacramento to its final dock at Rio Ramaza Marina. In 2012, the California State Lands Commission's Abandoned Vessels Program removed the Spirit of Sacramento from the Sacramento River and placed it on the riverbank.

As of 2025, the Spirit of Sacramento has not been moved from the banks of the Sacramento River and is prominently visible from the Garden Highway.
