= Sid Fleischman =

American writer (1920–2010)

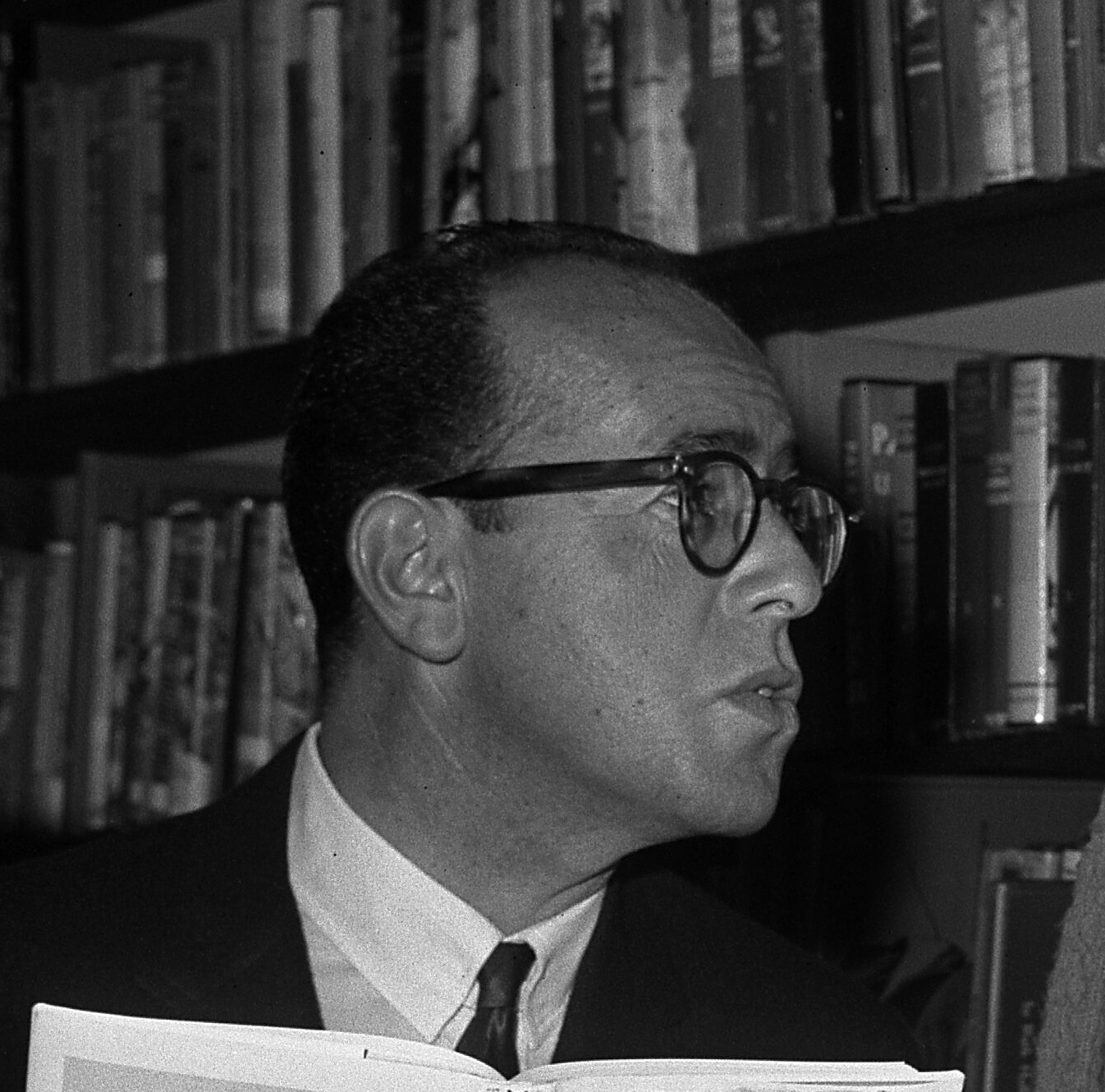
- Born: Avron Zalmon Fleischman; March 16, 1920; Brooklyn, New York, U.S.
- Died: March 17, 2010 (aged 90); Santa Monica, California, U.S.
- Education: San Diego State University (BA)
- Occupations: Writer, magician
- Spouse: Betty Taylor (d. 1993)
- Children: Paul Fleischman; Jane Fleischman; Anne Fleischman Miller
- Writing career
- Genres: Children's literature, comic novels
- Subject: Stage magic
- Notable awards: Newbery Medal; 1987; Horn Book Award; 1979
- Website: sidfleischman.com

Albert Sidney Fleischman (born Avron Zalmon Fleischman; March 16, 1920 – March 17, 2010) was an American author of children's books, screenplays, novels for adults, and nonfiction books about stage magic. His works for children are known for their humor, imagery, zesty plotting, and exploration of the byways of American history. He won the Newbery Medal in 1987 for The Whipping Boy and the Boston Globe–Horn Book Award in 1979 for Humbug Mountain. For his career contribution as a children's writer he was U.S. nominee for the biennial, international Hans Christian Andersen Award in 1994. In 2003, the Society of Children's Book Writers and Illustrators inaugurated the Sid Fleischman Humor Award in his honor, and made him the first recipient. The Award annually recognizes a writer of humorous fiction for children or young adults. He told his own tale in The Abracadabra Kid: A Writer's Life (1996).

== Early years ==
Fleischman was born Avron Zalmon Fleischman in Brooklyn, New York in 1920. His parents were Ukrainian Jews and moved the family to San Diego, California when Fleischman was two years old. As a youngster, he beheld his first stage magic performance, launching a lifelong fascination that would find a place in many of his books. He learned magic from library books and the local fraternity of magicians, inventing new tricks along the way. He began performing professionally while still in high school, touring California with his friend Buddy Ryan, performing in nightclubs, and traveling the country with the Francisco Spook Show during the last days of vaudeville.

In 1941 Fleischman joined the U.S. Navy Reserve. He served as a Yeoman aboard the destroyer escort USS Albert T. Harris with service near the Philippines, Borneo, and China. until 1946. He graduated from San Diego State University with a Bachelor of Arts in 1949.

== Career ==
=== Works for adults and the screen ===
At 19, Fleischman published his first book, Between Cocktails, a collection of magic tricks using paper matches. His college career at San Diego State College was interrupted by World War II, during which he served on a destroyer escort in the Pacific. After graduating with a degree in English, he worked as a reporter for the short-lived San Diego Daily Journal, covering everything from crime scenes to the political beat. After the newspaper folded, he turned to fiction. Drawing on his reporting experiences, his knowledge of magic, and his tour of the Pacific, he produced a series of novels of intrigue and adventure over the next 15 years, many set in the Far East. Nearly all have been recently reprinted in two-books-in-one format by Stark House Press.

When one of them—Blood Alley—caught the eye of director William Wellman, he hired Fleischman to adapt it to the screen. This both led to a move to Santa Monica, California, where Fleischman lived the rest of his life, and began a decades-long involvement with Hollywood. After Blood Alley was filmed, starring John Wayne and Lauren Bacall, Wellman used Fleischman on several other projects, including Lafayette Escadrille, based on Wellman's own experiences as a World War I pilot. Fleischman adapted his own novel Yellowleg for the screen, released as The Deadly Companions, the director Sam Peckinpah's first feature. Fleischman later worked on several projects with Kirk Douglas, including Scalawag. For children, he wrote teleplays for "The Bloodhound Gang" segments of the educational 3–2–1 Contact series, as well as the screenplay of The Whipping Boy (released as Prince Brat and the Whipping Boy).

=== Books for children ===
Using his three children as an audience for the first time, Fleischman wrote Mr. Mysterious & Company (1962), the adventures of a traveling magician's family in the old West. It was the first of many children's books that would draw on his background in magic and his interest in history. By the Great Horn Spoon! mined the California Gold Rush and was turned into the movie The Adventures of Bullwhip Griffin. The Ghost in the Noonday Sun, Chancy and the Grand Rascal, Jingo Django, and Humbug Mountain (1965 to 1978) spun fiction from the facts of East Coast pirates, Ohio River rafting, American Gypsies, and traveling printers. His series of books about Josh McBroom and his family's amazing one-acre farm made use of American tall tales. Later works looked farther afield, from England (The Whipping Boy) to Asia (The White Elephant) to Mexico (The Dream Stealer). Finding nonfiction to his liking after completing his autobiography, The Abracadabra Kid: A Writer's Life (1996), Fleischman went on to produce biographies of Harry Houdini, Mark Twain, and Charlie Chaplin.

== Personal life ==
Fleischman and his wife Betty, who died in 1993, had three children. His son Paul Fleischman followed him into the world of children's books. They are the only parent and child who've both won the Newbery Medal, the venerable American Library Association award that annually recognizes the "most distinguished contribution to American literature for children".

Fleischman maintained an interest in magic all his life, hosting monthly meetings of Los Angeles magicians at his home, publishing occasional articles in magic journals, and summing up what he had learned in The Charlatan's Handbook (1993). For young magicians, he wrote Mr. Mysterious's Secrets of Magic (1975).

Fleischman's other interests included gardening, astronomy, hand-printing, radio, and classical guitar.

Fleischman died on March 17, 2010, one day after his 90th birthday.

== Works ==
=== Fiction for children or young adults ===
- Mr. Mysterious & Company (1962), first children's book (Note: From 1968 to 1975, five books by Fleischman made the Deutscher Jugendliteraturpreis Children's Book shortlist in their first German-language editions. Those were his first four children's fiction books, all translated by Sybil Gräfin Schönfeldt—in German sequence, Mr. Mysterious & Company, By the Great Horn Spoon!, Chancy and the Grand Rascal, The Ghost in the Noonday Sun—and McBroom's Wonderful One-Acre Farm illustrated by Quentin Blake, the British omnibus edition of three early McBroom books.)
- By the Great Horn Spoon! (1963)
- The Ghost in the Noonday Sun (1965)
- Chancy and the Grand Rascal (1966)
- McBroom Tells the Truth (1966) (Note: McBroom's Wonderful One-Acre Farm (Chatto & Windus, 1972) was the U.K. edition of three early McBroom books, illustrated by Quentin Blake, later published in the U.S. (1992).)
- McBroom and the Big Wind (1967)
- McBroom's Ear (1970/1969)
- Longbeard the Wizard (1970)
- Jingo Django (1971)
- McBroom's Ghost (1971)
- McBroom's Zoo (1971/1972) (Note: Here Comes McBroom (Chatto & Windus, 1976) was the U.K. edition of three early McBroom books, illustrated by Quentin Blake, later published in the U.S. (1992).)
- The Wooden Cat Man (1972)
- McBroom the Rainmaker (1973)
- The Ghost on Saturday Night (1974)
- McBroom Tells a Lie (1976)
- Me and the Man on the Moon-Eyed Horse (1977); U.K. title, The Man on the Moon-Eyed Horse
- Kate's Secret Riddle Book (1977)
- McBroom and the Beanstalk (1978)
- Humbug Mountain (1978)
- Jim Bridger's Alarm Clock (1978)
- The Hey Hey Man (1979)
- McBroom and the Great Race (1980)
- The Bloodhound Gang
  - The Case of the Cackling Ghost (1981)
  - The Case of the Flying Clock (1981)
  - The Case of the Secret Message (1981)
  - The Case of Princess Tomorrow (1981)
  - The Case of the 264 Pound Burglar (1982)
  - The Bloodhound Gang's Secret Code Book (1982)
- McBroom's Almanac (1982/1984)
- The Whipping Boy (1986)
- The Scarebird (1988)
- The Ghost in the Noonday Sun (1999/1989)
- The Midnight Horse (1990)
- Jim Ugly (1992)
- The 13th Floor: A ghost story (1995)
- Bandit's Moon (1998)
- A Carnival of Animals (2000)
- Bo and Mzzz Mad (2001)
- Disappearing Act (2003)
- The Giant Rat of Sumatra (2005)
- The White Elephant (2006)
- The Entertainer and the Dybbuk (2008)
- The Dream Stealer (2009)

=== Nonfiction ===
- The Abracadabra Kid: A Writer's Life (1996) ‡
- Escape! The Story of the Great Houdini (2006)
- The Trouble Begins at 8: A Life of Mark Twain in the Wild, Wild West (2008)
- Sir Charlie: Chaplin, the Funniest Man in the World (2010)

‡ For children and young adults.

=== Fiction for adults ===
- The Straw Donkey Case (1948), first novel
- Murder's No Accident (1949)
- Shanghai Flame (1951)
- Look Behind You, Lady (1952)
- Danger in Paradise (1953)
- Malay Woman (1954)
- Counterspy Express (1954)
- Blood Alley (1955)
- Yellowleg (1960)
- The Venetian Blonde (1963)

=== Books on magic ===
- Between Cocktails (1939), first book
- Ready, Aim, Magic! (with Bob Gunther, 1942)
- Call the Witness (with Bob Gunther, 1943)
- The Blue Bug (with Bob Gunther, 1947)
- Top Secrets (with Bob Gunther, 1947)
- Magic Made Easy, as Carl March (1953)
- Mr. Mysterious's Secrets of Magic (1975); U.K. title, Secrets of Magic ‡
- The Charlatan's Handbook (1993)

‡ For children and young adults.

=== Screenplays ===
- Blood Alley (1955)
- Goodbye, My Lady, based on a novel by James Street (1956)
- Lafayette Escadrille, Fleischman and William A. Wellman (1958)
- The Deadly Companions (1961)
- Scalawag, Fleischman and Albert Maltz (1973)
- Prince Brat and the Whipping Boy, as Max Brindle (1994)

=== Plays ===
- Prince Brat and the Whipping Boy (musical, Seattle Children's Theatre, 2000)

== Adaptations ==
The Adventures of Bullwhip Griffin (Disney, 1967) is an adaptation of Fleischman's western novel By the Great Horn Spoon!, starring Roddy McDowell as Bullwhip Griffin.

Ghost in the Noonday Sun (Tyburn, 1973) is a loose adaptation of Fleischman's novel, starring Peter Sellers.
