= Prestini =

Prestini is an Italian surname. Notable people with the surname include:

- James Prestini (1908–1993), American sculptor, designer, and woodworker
- Leno Prestini (1906–1963), American painter and sculptor
- Paola Prestini (born 1975), Italian composer
