= Blood Alley =

1955 seafaring adventure movie directed by William A. Wellman

- Theatrical release poster
- Directed by: William A. Wellman
- Screenplay by: Albert Sidney Fleischman
- Based on: Blood Alley; 1955 novel by Albert Sidney Fleischman
- Produced by: John Wayne
- Starring: John Wayne; Lauren Bacall; Paul Fix; Joy Kim; Berry Kroeger; Mike Mazurki; Anita Ekberg
- Cinematography: William H. Clothier
- Edited by: Fred McDowell
- Music by: Roy Webb
- Production company: Batjac Productions
- Distributed by: Warner Bros. Pictures
- Release date: October 1, 1955
- Running time: 115 minutes
- Country: United States
- Language: English
- Budget: $2 million
- Box office: $2.2 million (US)

Blood Alley is a 1955 American seafaring Cold War adventure film produced by John Wayne, directed by William A. Wellman, and starring Wayne and Lauren Bacall. The film was distributed by Warner Bros. Pictures and shot in CinemaScope and Warnercolor. The film depicts a voyage from Chiku Shan, a village on the Communist Chinese coast, all the way to Hong Kong via the Formosa Strait.

== Plot ==
Captain Tom Wilder, an American Merchant Mariner, is taken prisoner after Chinese Communists seize his ship. After two years in prison, unknown accomplices help Wilder escape using bribery and disguising him as a Soviet army officer.

Wilder is transported to Chiku Shan village. The village leader, Mr. Tso, says Wilder has been recruited to transport nearly 200 residents out of Red China to the free British port of Hong Kong. Wilder is to pilot a stolen wood burning, flat-bottomed, 19th-Century stern-wheel riverboat. He will have to navigate using a coastal map drafted from memory, an unreliable magnetic compass, and without a chronometer. Wilder must also rely on the villagers' determination and ingenuity to escape.

The resourceful villagers have planned their escape for over a year, gradually raising the harbor channel's bottom with stones to trap the local Red Chinese patrol boat once it is lured inside and run aground on sunken sampans. The villagers have also accumulated arms, including machine guns, rifles, and revolvers. They are also forced to bring along the large Communist Feng family to protect them from being blamed for the mass escape.

Tack, the riverboat's Chief Engineer, who is a U.S. Navy-trained marine engineer, helps steal the steamboat. Tack and Wilder bring the stern wheeler to Chiku Shan village where it is provisioned with fuel, food, and water; it is re-christened Chiku Shan, after the village.

Wilder meets American Cathy Grainger, the daughter of a missionary doctor. When Cathy refuses to leave without her absent father, Wilder informs her that Dr. Grainger was executed by the Red Chinese, though she disbelieves him.

Following their plan, the villagers lure the patrol boat into the harbor, trapping it there. They flee in the steamboat, later bluffing their way past a People's Liberation Army Navy destroyer before disappearing into a fog bank. The escapees hide the boat in shoreline reed marshes during the day and sail southward at night. The Feng family attempts to sabotage the escape, first by poisoning the food and water supply, then attempting and failing to take over Chiku Shan during a heavy storm. Meanwhile, Cathy finds herself attracted to the gruff Wilder.

A shortage of firewood and drinking and boiler water compels the Chiku Shan to pull into the Graveyard of Ships at Honghai Bay. Captain Wilder orders the wrecks stripped of wood and water siphoned from various depressions and abandoned tanks. A loose heavy timber plows through the stern wheel while mooring the steamboat, snapping two paddle blades. Wilder stays in the Graveyard to make repairs. At the same time, Cathy goes ashore and returns after learning her father's fate. The Fengs are put ashore, only to be taken back aboard when the pursuing Red Chinese destroyer begins shelling the Graveyard from a distance. It launches power boats to search for the ferry in the shallow harbor.

Chiku Shan escapes into a marshy estuary. Because engine smoke would reveal their position, the villagers both pole and tow the riverboat through miles of marshlands until reaching the open sea beyond the destroyer's search area. Tack lights off the boiler, and the steamboat proceeds to Hong Kong with the refugees. Their triumphant arrival is hailed by the steam whistles and ship sirens of every vessel in the harbor.

== Cast ==
- John Wayne as Captain Tom Wilder
- Lauren Bacall as Cathy Grainger, a medical missionary's daughter
- Paul Fix as Mr. Tso, the senior village elder and headman
- Joy Kim as Susu, Cathy Grainger's housekeeper
- Berry Kroeger (Berry Kroger), as Old Feng, the Communist Feng family patriarch
- Mike Mazurki as Big Han, Wilder's First Mate
- Anita Ekberg as Wei Ling, Big Han's wife
- Henry Nakamura as Tack, the Chief Engineer
- James Hong as Communist Soldier (uncredited)
- Lowell Gilmore as British Officer (uncredited)

== Production ==
The film's screenplay was written by Albert Sidney Fleischman, based on his novel, and was produced by Wayne's Batjac Productions. Location filming took place in and near China Camp, a shrimp fishing village in the San Francisco Bay. Additional filming occurred at Point Orient shrimp camp where the film crew was largely based in what is now known as Point San Pablo Yacht Harbor (located on Point San Pablo). Filming occurred at the Sacramento River, Stockton, California, and the northern California coast.

The Chinese Communist soldiers who search the village are armed with Model 1891 Mosin–Nagant rifles (probably ex-U.S. Rifle, 7.62 mm, Model of 1916 rifles) rather than the more appropriate Model 91/30s the Communists would have carried, having been exported to Mao's army during the Chinese Civil War. The determination as to model can be made in the scene where Captain Wilder is shown watching Mr. Feng in his car with the Mosin–Nagant laid across his knees. The single blade front sight and thick barrel bands of the Model 1891 are unmistakable.

Blood Alley is a nickname for the Formosa Strait. Blood Alley is a nickname for Rue Chu Pao-san, a short street off Avenue Edward VII, located in Shanghai, where Fleischman had visited as a sailor on the USS Albert T. Harris (DE-447). He was paid $5000 for the rights for his novel and was hired to write the screenplay.

The Communist patrol boat that the villagers trap on their artificial reef was actually a rescue boat on loan to the film company by the U.S. Air Force.

== Casting ==
"Later, my dad (John Wayne) discovered that William Wellman drove Robert Mitchum to quit (though not necessarily to drink). The TV show This Is Your Life had once profiled Wellman. When the show’s producers asked the acclaimed director for a list of people to interview, Wellman included Mitchum, whose stalled career Wellman had boosted in 1946 by casting Mitchum as the lead in The Story of GI Joe. Mitchum told the producers, no, he didn’t have time to talk about William Wellman. When Wellman found out, he was livid. When the two men worked on Blood Alley, he took his revenge by badgering Mitchum around the clock."

Wayne plays a Merchant Marine captain in a role originally intended for Robert Mitchum prior to an altercation with the producers. Mitchum was fired from the production by Wellman. Wayne took over the lead after Gregory Peck turned the film down and Humphrey Bogart requested a large amount of money to assume the role.

Swedish actress Anita Ekberg, veteran actor Paul Fix, actor Berry Kroeger, and film character actor Mike Mazurki all play Chinese roles in Hollywood "yellowface". Most of the extras, however, are ethnic Chinese.

== Awards ==
Anita Ekberg was awarded the Golden Globe for Best Female Newcomer for her performance in Blood Alley.

In addition, the United States Air Force awarded the cast and crew of Blood Alley a Certificate of Merit for encouraging recruitment for the United States Air Force by their work in the movie. John Wayne took the oath on behalf of the film's company as Honorary USAF Recruiters.

== Promotion ==
The film was promoted by the appearance of Wayne on the number-one rated television show, I Love Lucy. In an unusual two-episode arc airing as the show's season opener on October 10, 1955, Lucy and Ethel steal Wayne's footprints from the forecourt of Grauman's Chinese Theatre the night before the premiere of Blood Alley, and complications ensue. During the second episode, a studio employee interrupts Wayne in his dressing room to show him a poster for Blood Alley. The film was also promoted during the closing credits.

== Critical reception ==
Despite the star power of its lead actors and director, Blood Alley received a lukewarm reception from critics. The New York Times said, "Blood Alley, despite its exotic, oriental setting, is a standard chase melodrama patterned on a familiar blueprint." Today's critics have focused on Blood Alley's anti-communist aspect. DVD Talk called it "preposterous but entertaining" and said, "Wayne and Bacall have no chemistry at all".

== Home media ==
Blood Alley was released on DVD May 4, 2005 by Warner Bros. Home Video. The film was re-released on Blu-ray July 18, 2017 by the Warner Archive Collection.

== See also ==
- List of American films of 1955
- John Wayne filmography
- Soldier of Fortune (1955 film), a movie with a similar plot
