= Living It Up =

1954 film by Norman Taurog

- Original film poster
- Directed by: Norman Taurog
- Written by: Jack Rose; Melville Shavelson
- Produced by: Paul Jones
- Starring: Dean Martin; Jerry Lewis; Janet Leigh; Edward Arnold
- Cinematography: Daniel L. Fapp
- Edited by: Archie Marshek
- Music by: Walter Scharf
- Production company: York Pictures Corporation
- Distributed by: Paramount Pictures
- Release date: July 23, 1954
- Running time: 100 minutes
- Country: United States
- Language: English
- Box office: $4.25 million (US); 916,275 admissions (France)

Living It Up is a 1954 American comedy film starring Dean Martin and Jerry Lewis which was released by Paramount Pictures.

The film was directed by Norman Taurog and produced by Paul Jones. The screenplay by Jack Rose and Melville Shavelson was based on the musical Hazel Flagg (1953) by Ben Hecht, which was in turn based on the story "Letter to the Editor" by James H. Street.

An earlier film based on Street's story, Nothing Sacred (1937), had been by Selznick International Pictures (released through United Artists) with Carole Lombard and Fredric March, and directed by William A. Wellman. The 1954 version features original music by Walter Scharf, cinematography by Daniel L. Fapp, art direction by Albert Nozaki and Hal Pereira, and costume design by Edith Head.

In addition to Martin and Lewis, the cast of Living It Up includes Janet Leigh, Edward Arnold, Fred Clark, Sheree North, and Sig Ruman.

== Plot ==
Homer Flagg is a railroad worker in the small town of Desert Hole, New Mexico. His big dream in life is to visit New York City while he is young.

One day he finds an abandoned automobile at an old atomic proving ground. His doctor and best friend, Steve Harris, diagnoses him with radiation poisoning and gives Homer three weeks to live.

Wally Cook, a reporter for a New York newspaper, hears of Homer's plight and convinces Oliver Stone, her editor, to provide an all-expenses paid trip to fulfill Homer's lifelong fantasy of seeing New York.

Steve, however, realizes that he made an error and Homer is only suffering from a sinus condition. Steve agrees to keep this new diagnosis a secret after Homer begs him ... particularly after meeting the attractive reporter. Steve announces that only he can provide medical treatment to Homer and must accompany him on the trip.

New York embraces Homer and he becomes a celebrity, with everyone following his every move in the paper. Homer even makes plans to marry Wally, despite the fact that she has fallen for Steve.

Meanwhile, editor Stone is anxious for Homer to die. Every day it costs the newspaper money to support the dying man's extravagant requests, which includes ordering 3,000 shrimp cocktails for his hotel suite. Stone hires three specialists to examine Homer, who is given a clean bill of health.

To escape the fix that they have gotten themselves into, Homer fakes suicide. The newspaper gets the exclusive story. Wally marries Steve, and the two guys get new jobs in New York as street sweepers.

== Cast ==
Actor	Role
Dean Martin	Steve Harris
Jerry Lewis	Homer Flagg
Janet Leigh	Wally Cook
Edward Arnold	The Mayor
Fred Clark	Oliver Stone
Sheree North	Jitterbug Dancer
Sammy White	Waiter
Sig Ruman	Dr. Emile Egelhofer
Richard Loo	Dr. Lee

== Production ==
Living It Up was filmed from October 19 to December 18, 1953. Sig Ruman, who plays Dr. Emil Eggelhoffer, had played the same role in the 1937 version.

Doing a jitterbug in a dance scene with Lewis, actress Sheree North's character is introduced by a master of ceremonies with her own name, "Sheree North."

The song "Every Street's a Boulevard in Old New York", performed by Martin and Lewis, was originally written by Jule Styne for the musical Hazel Flagg. Martin also sings Styne's songs How Do You Speak to an Angel? and Money Burns a Hole in My Pocket in this film.

== Re-release ==
The film was re-released with another Martin and Lewis film, Pardners, in 1965.

== Home media ==
The film was included on a five-film DVD set, the Dean Martin and Jerry Lewis Collection: Volume Two, released on June 5, 2007.
