= Nothing Sacred (film) =

1937 film by William A. Wellman

- Theatrical release poster
- Directed by: William A. Wellman
- Written by: Ben Hecht (screenplay); with uncredited contributions from: Budd Schulberg; Ring Lardner Jr.; Dorothy Parker; Sidney Howard; Moss Hart; George S. Kaufman; Robert Carson
- Based on: "Letter to the Editor"; 1937 short story Cosmopolitan by James H. Street
- Produced by: David O. Selznick
- Starring: Carole Lombard; Fredric March; Charles Winninger; Walter Connolly
- Cinematography: W. Howard Greene
- Edited by: James E. Newcom
- Music by: Oscar Levant
- Production company: Selznick International
- Distributed by: United Artists
- Release date: November 25, 1937
- Running time: 77 minutes
- Country: United States
- Language: English
- Budget: $1.3 million
- Box office: $2 million (U.S. and Canada rentals)

Nothing Sacred is a 1937 American Technicolor screwball comedy film directed by William A. Wellman, produced by David O. Selznick, and starring Carole Lombard and Fredric March with a supporting cast featuring Charles Winninger and Walter Connolly. Ben Hecht was credited with the screenplay based on the 1937 story "Letter to the Editor" by James H. Street, and an array of additional writers, including Ring Lardner Jr., Budd Schulberg, Dorothy Parker, Sidney Howard, Moss Hart, George S. Kaufman and Robert Carson made uncredited contributions.

The lush, Gershwinesque music score was by Oscar Levant, with additional music by Alfred Newman and Max Steiner and a swing number by Raymond Scott's Quintette. The film was shot in Technicolor by W. Howard Greene and edited by James E. Newcom, and was a Selznick International Pictures production distributed by United Artists. The film's opening credits feature distinctive caricatures of the leading actors, as 3d-figurines, and creative artists, as 2d-cartoons, by Sam Berman.

This was Lombard's only feature-length Technicolor film. She stated that this film was one of her personal favorites.

== Plot ==
Nothing Sacred (1937)

New York newspaper reporter Wally Cook is blamed for reporting the Harlem bootblack Ernest Walker as a nobleman "of the Orient" who is hosting a charity event. Cook claims he was unaware, but he is demoted to writing obituaries. He begs his boss Oliver Stone for another chance, and points out a story about a woman, Hazel Flagg, reportedly dying of radium poisoning.

Cook is sent to the (fictional) town of Warsaw, Vermont, to interview Hazel. Cook finally locates Hazel, who is crying both because her doctor has told her that she is not dying and because she realizes she might be stuck in Vermont for her whole life. Unaware of this, Cook invites Hazel and her doctor to New York as guests of the Morning Star newspaper.

The newspaper uses her story to increase its circulation. She receives a ticker-tape parade and the key to the city, and becomes an inspiration to many. She and Wally fall in love, and he asks her to marry him even though he still thinks she's dying. After a medical exam by four independent doctors, it is finally discovered that Hazel is not really dying, and city officials and Stone decide that it would be better to avoid embarrassment by having it seem that she went off to die, "like an elephant". Hazel and Wally get married and quietly set sail for the tropics.

== Cast ==
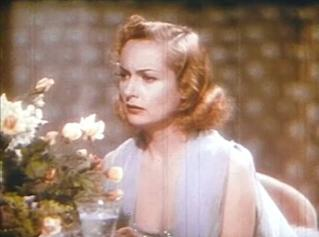
Carole Lombard

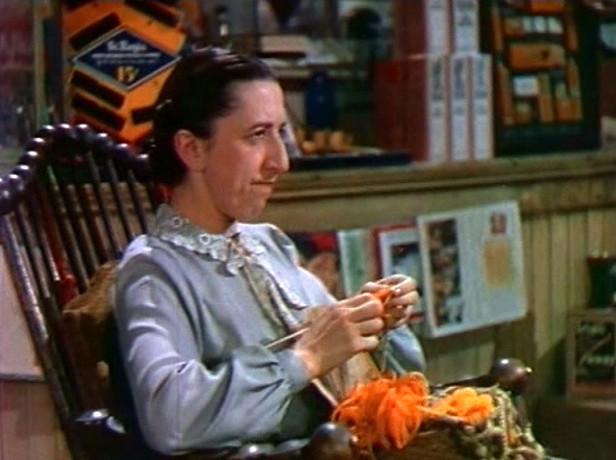
Margaret Hamilton as drugstore lady

- Carole Lombard as Hazel Flagg
- Fredric March as Wally Cook
- Charles Winninger as Dr. Enoch Downer
- Walter Connolly as Oliver Stone
- Sig Ruman as Dr. Emil Eggelhoffer (as Sig Rumann)
- Frank Fay as master of ceremonies
- Troy Brown as Ernest Walker
- Maxie Rosenbloom as Max Levinsky
- Margaret Hamilton as Vermont drugstore lady
- Hattie McDaniel as Mrs. Walker
- Olin Howland as Will Bull
- Raymond Scott as musical leader
- John Qualen as fireman (uncredited)
- George Chandler as photographer (uncredited)

According to William Wellman Jr., Janet Gaynor had originally been cast as Hazel Flagg to follow on the success of A Star Is Born (1937). However, after William Wellman Sr. met Carole Lombard, he convinced Selznick to cast her because Gaynor became unavailable.

A boxing world champion, Maxie Rosenbloom, gave Lombard boxing lessons to prepare her for her fight scene with Fredric March.

== Production ==
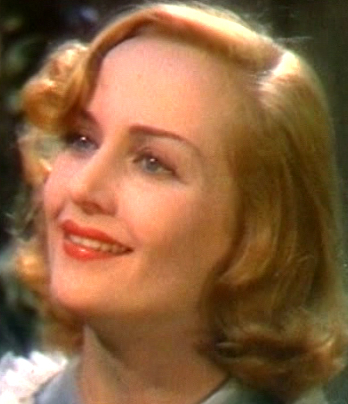
Carole Lombard in Nothing Sacred

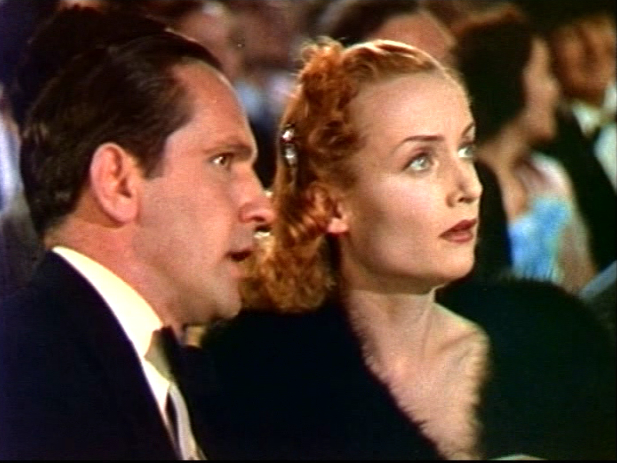
Fredric March and Carole Lombard

The first screwball comedy filmed in color, Nothing Sacred also represents the first use in a color film of process effects, montage and rear screen projection. Backgrounds for the rear projection were filmed on the streets of New York. Paramount Pictures, 20th Century-Fox and other studios refined this technique in their subsequent color features.

Ben Hecht is credited with writing the screenplay in two weeks on a train. He adapted the story "Letter to the Editor" by James H. Street which had been first been published in Hearst's International-Cosmopolitan. Hecht wrote a role for his friend John Barrymore in the film, but David Selznick refused to use him as Barrymore had become an alcoholic. This caused a rift between Hecht and Selznick, and Hecht walked off the picture. Budd Schulberg and Dorothy Parker were called in to write the final scenes and several others also made contributions to the screenplay, including: David O. Selznick, William Wellman, Sidney Howard, Moss Hart, George S. Kaufman and Robert Carson.

One reason that the film is considered among the most celebrated screwball comedies is that underneath the humor, it incorporates sharply cynical themes of corruption and dishonesty. This film, along with Hecht's The Front Page (1931) and its 1940 remake His Girl Friday with Cary Grant, caricatures the chicanery to which some newspapers resorted in order to get a "hot" story.

Production on the film started on June 12, 1937 and ended on August 2, 1937.

== Reception ==
Despite receiving critical acclaim, the film recorded a loss of $350,000 at the box office. In July 2018, it was selected to be screened in the Venice Classics section at the 75th Venice International Film Festival.

== Copyright and home media ==
In 1965, the film entered the public domain in the United States because the copyright owners did not renew its copyright registration in the 28th year after publication.

Because of its public domain status, the film is a staple of bargain bin releases and collections. In 2011, Kino Lorber issued the film on DVD and Blu-ray, mastered from a 2K scan of Selznick's personal nitrate print, preserved by the George Eastman House Motion Picture Department. In 2018, Kino reissued their Blu-ray, this time mastered from a 2K scan of Disney's 1999 restoration, carried out on behalf of ABC, holder of most of the Selznick library.

== Remakes ==
Ben Hecht's screenplay was also the basis of a Broadway musical Hazel Flagg (1953), with Helen Gallagher, as well as Living It Up (1954), a comedy film starring Dean Martin in the Winninger role, Jerry Lewis in the Lombard role (as Homer Flagg), and Janet Leigh in the March role.
