= The High Calling =

1951 American novel by James Street

- Author: James Street
- Language: English
- Publisher: Doubleday
- Publication date: 1951
- Publication place: United States
- Media type: Print (hardcover)
- Pages: 308
- Preceded by: The Gauntlet

The High Calling is a 1951 American novel with religious themes by James Street. It was published by Doubleday and continues the saga of Baptist minister London Wingo, a character introduced in Street's previous novel The Gauntlet. As with its predecessor, Street drew on his own experiences as a Baptist preacher.

== Plot ==
The action takes place twenty years after the events of The Gauntlet. Following the death of his wife, Rev. London Wingo and his daughter return to their former parish in Linden, Missouri. Romantic and ecclesiastical entanglements ensue.

== Reception ==
The High Calling earned generally positive reviews in the American press upon its initial release. John Crown of The Atlanta Journal-Constitution predicted it would find an audience across all faiths despite its religious focus, describing it as "written with warmth and a deep insight into the live of a sincere man of God." It was commended for its earnestness and relatable characters by Rader Winget, who described it as "good, normal wholesome stuff--and exciting."

Writing for the Raleigh News and Observer, Bryan Haislip wrote that "while the new novel has in it many fine things, it will invariably provoke unfavorable comparisons with its predecessor" and wrote that the ending "breaks off on an utterly preposterous note, as though Street had suddenly tired of the whole thing." Sterling North's review similarly mocked it with faint praise: "The High Calling is a readable, well-constructed novel. Street is thoroughly capable of fashioning a plot and bringing his story to a satisfying climax. Perhaps he telegraphs his punches – but the punches are there."

As with his previous novel, The High Calling was optioned by a major film studio, but a film adaptation was never produced.

In the preface for his book about the Left Behind series, author William Powell Tuck mentioned that The High Calling (was) the first novel he read that featured explicitly Christian themes, adding "I have read much better 'Christian' fiction since my first encounter with that kind of literature."
