= Dorothy Wellman =

American actress (1913–2009)

- Born: Dorothy Rae Coonan; November 25, 1913; Minneapolis, Minnesota, U.S.
- Died: September 16, 2009 (aged 95); Brentwood, California, U.S.
- Other names: Dorothy Coonan; Dorothy Coonan Wellman
- Occupations: Actress, dancer
- Years active: 1929–1945
- Spouse: William Wellman (m. 1934; died 1975)
- Children: 7

Dorothy Wellman (born Dorothy Rae Coonan; November 25, 1913 – September 16, 2009) was an American actress and dancer. Wellman was the widow of film director William Wellman, to whom she was married from 1934 until his death in 1975. Wellman cast her in several of his films.

== Early life ==
Wellman was born Dorothy Rae Coonan in Minnesota in 1913. She was the fourth child of six children of Florence (née Taylor) and Daniel Raymond Coonan, who was a traveling salesman. By 1920, she had moved to Oakland, California with her family and later that decade relocated with her mother and siblings to Los Angeles.

== Career ==
Her career as a dancer began at the age of 14 with Warner Brothers Studios. Her early film credits as an on-screen dancer and actress included small, uncredited parts in early sound films such as The Broadway Melody (1929), Whoopee! (1930), Kiki (1931) Palmy Days (1931), and The Kid from Spain (1932). Her best-known films were 42nd Street (1933) and Gold Diggers of 1933. Many of the films in which she appeared were choreographed by Busby Berkeley.

== Career highlight ==
Film director William Wellman cast Coonan as Sally, a "hobo" disguised as a male, in the 1933 Depression-era drama Wild Boys of the Road. This was her only role in which she was credited on screen. She does make a later uncredited appearance in Wellman's The Story of G.I. Joe (1945), portraying a World War II army nurse nicknamed "Red" who marries a soldier on the battlefield, where he is soon killed.

== Personal life and death ==
Coonan and Wellman were married in Nevada in March 1934. The couple remained married for over four decades, until William's death on December 9, 1975. Their seven children all worked in entertainment to some extent. She died of natural causes at her home in Brentwood, California, at age 95 on September 16, 2009.
