= James Street (novelist) =

American journalist

James Howell Street (October 15, 1903 – September 28, 1954) was an American journalist, minister, and writer of Southern historical novels.

== Biography ==
Street was born in Lumberton, Mississippi, in 1903. As a teenager, he began working as a journalist for newspapers in Laurel (Laurel Leader Call) and Hattiesburg, Mississippi. At the age of 20, Street, born a Roman Catholic, decided to become a Baptist minister, attending Southwestern Baptist Theological Seminary and Howard College. Unsatisfied with his pastoral work after ministering stints in Missouri, Mississippi, and Alabama, Street returned to journalism in 1926.

After briefly holding a position with the Pensacola, Florida Journal, Street joined the staff of the Associated Press. The AP position took him to New York, where he began freelance writing fiction. Hired away from the AP by the New York World-Telegram in 1937, Street sold a short story ("A Letter to the Editor") to Cosmopolitan magazine, which caught the eye of film producer David Selznick, who turned it into a hit film, Nothing Sacred. The Broadway musical, Hazel Flagg, was based on his short story, as well as the Dean Martin and Jerry Lewis-film Living It Up.

His success allowed him to write full-time, and throughout the 1940s he worked on a five-novel series of historical fiction about the progress of the Dabney family through the 19th century. The Dabney pentalogy—Oh, Promised Land; Tap Roots; By Valor and Arms; Tomorrow We Reap; and Mingo Dabney —explored classic Southern issues of race and honor, and strongly characterized Street's struggle to reconcile his Southern heritage with his feelings about racial injustice. The series was a critical and popular success, with several of the books being made into feature films. Street modeled characters in his Dabney family saga on Sam Dale, Newt Knight and Greenwood LeFlore.

Street also published two popular works about boys and dogs, the short story "The Biscuit Eater" and the novel Good-bye, My Lady, both turned into movies (the former in both 1940 and 1972, the latter in 1956), and a set of semi-autobiographical novels about a Baptist minister, The Gauntlet and The High Calling; both were bought by Hollywood but never produced.

Street's short stories and articles appeared regularly in Cosmopolitan, The Saturday Evening Post, Collier's and Holiday.

== Death ==
Street died of a heart attack in Chapel Hill, North Carolina, on September 28, 1954, at age 50.

He was in Chapel Hill to present awards for excellence in radio broadcasting at a banquet, for which the main speaker was a "Reporter From the Pentagon" (as described by Scott Jarrad, a radio journalist who was to receive an award, who did not give the man's name). According to Jarrad, the "Reporter from the Pentagon" made a pure power politics argument in favor of preventive war against the Communist nations. Street, who was to present the awards, speaking after that main address, vehemently attacked the position put forward by the "Reporter from the Pentagon," in a spontaneous rant Jarrad described as "an explosion," laced with mild profanity; "in a word, he was magnificent."

Following that rant, however, again according to Jarrad, Street presented the broadcasting awards warmly and politely. Jarrad specifically mentioned the firm and affectionate handshake from Street at the presentation of the award. However, shortly after the ceremony, Street "laid his head on the table like a baby," dead of a fatal heart attack. Jarrad speculated that the "explosion" of Street's vehement rant may have been the stress that caused his fatal heart attack.

Scott Jarrad's letter was recorded by professional actors and made into the short film, A Colleague's Tribute to Southern Author James Street. Included is a gallery of 32 private family photographs. Several are also included in the short film produced by James Street's nephew, Elliott Street, and Jerry Griffin of The Performance Gallery in Atlanta, Georgia.

== Major works ==
- Look Away! A Dixie Notebook (1936)
- "The Biscuit Eater" (1939)
- Oh, Promised Land (1940)
- In My Father's House (1941)
- Tap Roots (1942)
- By Valour and Arms (1944)
- The Gauntlet (1945)
- Short Stories (1945)
- Tomorrow We Reap (1949)
- Mingo Dabney (1950)
- The High Calling (1951)
- The Velvet Doublet (1953)
- The Civil War (1953)
- Good-Bye, My Lady (1954)
- The Revolutionary War (1954)
- Pride of Possession with Don Tracy (1960)
