= By the Great Horn Spoon! =

1963 novel by Sid Fleischman

By The Great Horn Spoon!
- First edition
- Author: Sid Fleischman
- Illustrator: Eric von Schmidt
- Language: English
- Genre: Historical fiction
- Publisher: Little, Brown and Company
- Publication date: 1963
- Publication place: United States
- Media type: Print (hardback & paperback)
- Pages: 193

By The Great Horn Spoon! is a children's novel by Sid Fleischman, published in 1963. It tells the story of a 12-year-old boy and his English butler and their adventures in the California Gold Rush. It was adapted into the Disney film The Adventures of Bullwhip Griffin, starring Roddy McDowall and Suzanne Pleshette. Because of its setting, the novel is recommended by the California Department of Education as a literary selection for classroom use for grades 3-7.

== Plot ==
Twelve-year-old Jack heads to California to search for gold after his Aunt Arabella loses all her money. He is accompanied by Aunt Arabella's butler, Praiseworthy. They plan to pay for passage on the ship Lady Wilma, but when a criminal named Cut-Eye Higgins steals their tickets, they stow away instead. Captain Swain catches them and forces them to work for their passage in the coal bunkers, but they expose Higgins and regain their berths. While aboard, they meet Dr. Buckbee, who possesses a map of the gold fields. Cut-Eye Higgins steals the map and escapes. Jack adopts a pig aboard the ship. During the journey, the Lady Wilma sails around the Strait of Magellan and wins a race against a ship called the Sea Raven.

After arriving in California, Praiseworthy and Jack give a miner named Quartz Jackson a haircut. Quartz Jackson teaches them how to pan for gold and gives them the gold dust from his beard trimmings. He gives the gold dust to Praiseworthy, who conceals it in the fingers of his glove. Praiseworthy and Jack board a stagecoach for the gold fields, only to discover Cut-Eye Higgins on the same journey. Highwaymen hold up the stagecoach and one tries to take Aunt Arabella's picture from Praiseworthy. Praiseworthy knocks him out with a punch from his left glove, weighted by the gold dust. The robbers take Higgins' coat, which supposedly contained the map of the gold fields.

Jack and Praiseworthy arrive in Hangtown and have several adventures. Jack accidentally buys a bushel of neckties at an auction, but turns a profit reselling them to the miners. When exaggerated tales of Praiseworthy's fight with the robbers reaches the miners, they give him the nickname "Bullwhip". A brawler named Mountain Ox challenges Praiseworthy to a boxing match. Jack drinks coffee for the first time and earns the nickname "Jamoka Jack".

Jack buys a rifle and goes on a hunting trip, where he falls down a coyote hole and is rescued by one of the stagecoach robbers, who is wearing Cut-Eye Higgins' coat. Jack takes the coat, but the map is no longer there. Jack and Praiseworthy track Higgins to a mining town called Shirt-Tail Camp, where Higgins has become the local dentist. They arrive just in time to see Higgins being sentenced to hanging for stealing a horse. Eager to find the map, they negotiate for his release, but discover that the map is worthless. The Justice of the Peace agrees to postpone the hanging until another dentist can be found, but still orders Jack and Praiseworthy to dig Higgins' grave. As they dig, they find gold. Having made their fortunes, they return to Hangtown, where Praiseworthy wins his fight with the Mountain Ox.

On the journey back to San Francisco by steamboat, the boat sinks and Jack and Praiseworthy are forced to leave their gold and possessions to avoid drowning. They return to the ship empty-handed, but makes their money back selling cats from the ship. As they are planning to leave, they are met by Jack's sisters, Constance and Sarah, and his Aunt Arabella. Praiseworthy, having given up his career as a butler, proposes to Aunt Arabella, she agrees to marry him. The family settles down in the mining towns, where Praiseworthy plans to become the first lawyer in the West.

== Reception ==
Horn Book had high praise for the novel, calling it "a delectable story, told and illustrated with zest and gusto to the very last page". Kirkus Reviews was less complimentary and thought the book inferior to Fleischman's other work.

== Film adaptation ==
In 1967, Walt Disney Pictures adapted By the Great Horn Spoon! into a film called The Adventures of Bullwhip Griffin. Bryan Russell starred as Jack and Roddy McDowall played "Eric Griffin", the new name for the butler character. Suzanne Pleshette played Aunt Arabella, who in this version follows them to California and becomes a singer in a saloon. The character of Cut-Eye Higgins was changed from a criminal to a corrupt judge and portrayed by Karl Malden.
