= Second Hand Love =

1923 film

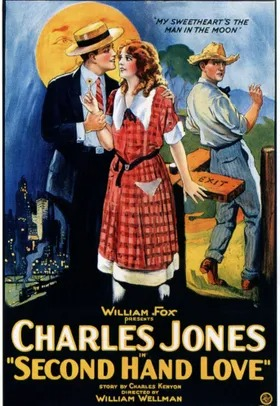
- Directed by: William Wellman
- Written by: Shannon Fife (story); Charles Kenyon (scenario)
- Produced by: William Fox
- Starring: Buck Jones
- Cinematography: Donovan Short
- Distributed by: Fox Film Corporation
- Release date: August 26, 1923
- Running time: 5 reels
- Country: USA
- Language: Silent (with English titles)

Second Hand Love is a 1923 American melodrama film directed by William A. Wellman. It was released on August 12, 1923, and had five reels.

== Premise ==
Andy Hanks helps Angela Trent escape from her bootlegger husband.

== Cast ==
- Buck Jones as Andy Hanks (*as Charles Jones)
- Ruth Dwyer as Angela Trent
- Charles Coleman as Dugg
- Harvey Clark as Scratch, The Detective
- Frank Weed as Deacon Seth Poggins
- James Quinn as Dugg's Partner
- Gus Leonard as The Constable

== Production ==
Wellman's biography relates that "Between August 1923 and May 1924, Wellman directed seven Westerns at Fox Studios. Six of these oaters starred one of the best loved and most idolized of the series Western stars, Charles 'Buck' Jones", the first being Second Hand Love. Their first collaboration is reported to have been enjoyable.

== Reception ==
A review in Moving Picture World wrote it was a satire of gossiping in small town communities, praised the climax of the library burning but wondered if the title was appropriate. Another review, in Motion Picture News, praised the same scene but found the setting stereotyped and the film mediocre. The Exhibitor's Trade Review stated: "Charles Jones furnishes an agreeable character sketch in the role of Andy. Ruth Dwyer is sweetly charming and wistfully appealing, as becomes a persecuted heroine. The support is capable and the village types life-like. There are many pretty exteriors, the interiors are skillfully filmed and the lighting is clear and distinct."
