= Clayton, Washington =

Unincorporated community in Washington, United States

- Unincorporated community and Census-designated place
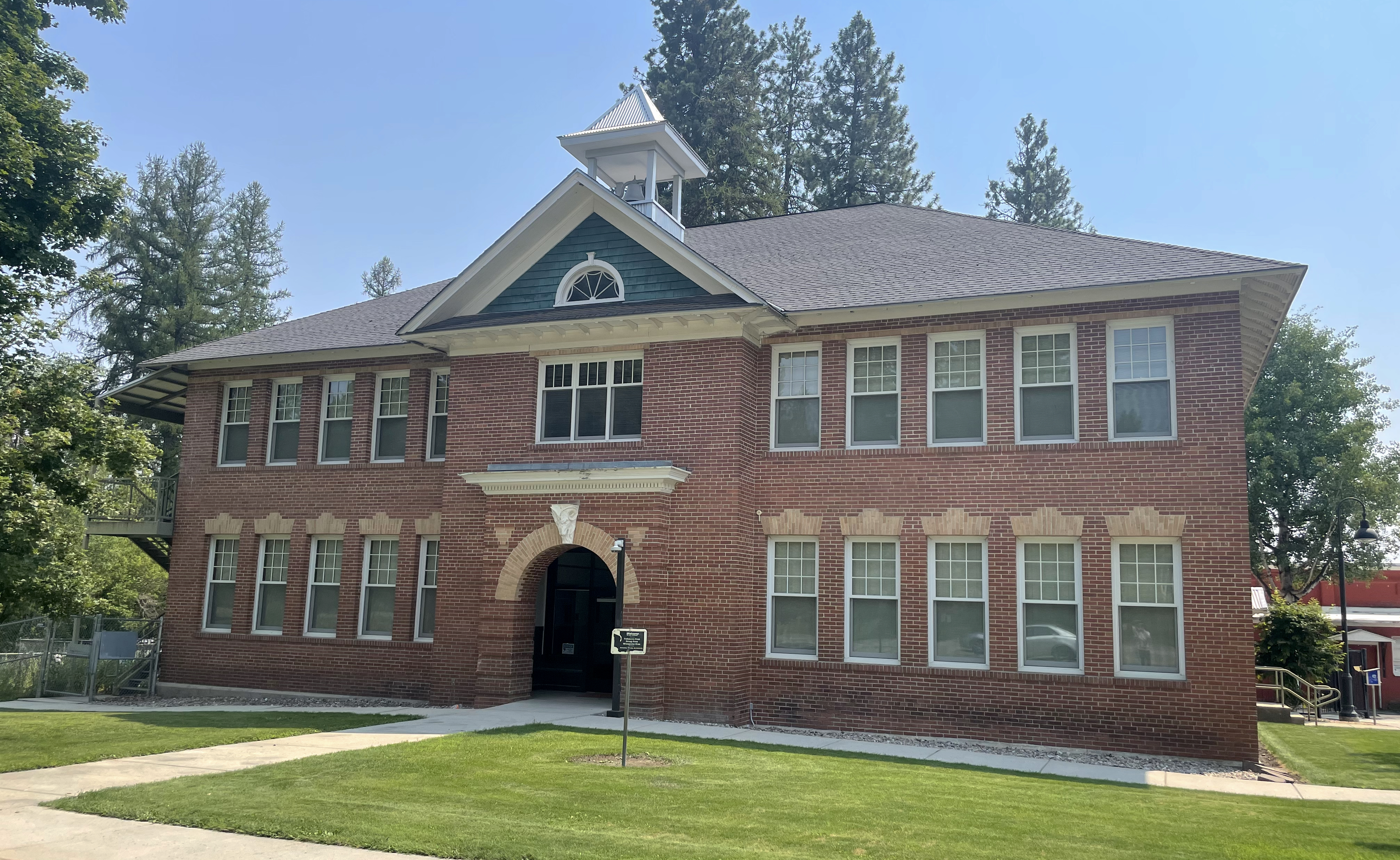
- Clayton School

- Location within Washington (state)
- Coordinates: 47°59′56″N 117°33′36″W
- Country: United States
- State: Washington
- County: Stevens
- Elevation: 2,287 ft (697 m)
- Time zone: UTC-8 (Pacific (PST))
  - Summer (DST): UTC-7 (PDT)
- ZIP code: 99110
- Area code: 509
- GNIS feature ID: 2586731

Clayton is an unincorporated community and census-designated place in Stevens County, Washington, United States. It is located along U.S. Route 395 4.5 miles (7.2 km) northwest of Deer Park, and has a post office with ZIP code 99110.

Clayton was founded in 1889 and was named for nearby clay deposits. The Washington Brick Company was established in 1893. It, along with most of the town, was lost to a catastrophic fire in 1908, but the town rebuilt, and the new Washington Brick, Lime, and Sewer Pipe company became noted for its high-quality products, including beautiful decorative terra cotta panels, which were crafted largely by skilled artisans who had immigrated to Washington from northern Italy.

Clayton as of the 2020 census, had a population of 420. The median household income is about $32,000. The average annual temperature is about 47 °F, which is approximately 7 °F lower than the average temperature throughout the United States. The average age of residents is 28 years old, 9 years younger than the U.S. average.

== Notable residents ==
It was the birthplace of the Hollywood writer Robert Carson, and the residence of artist Leno Prestini.

== Demographics ==
Historical population
Census	Pop.	Note	%±
2010	443		—
2020	420		−5.2%
U.S. Decennial Census; 2000 2010

Clayton first appeared as a census designated place in the 2010 U.S. census.

=== Racial and ethnic composition ===
Clayton CDP, Washington – Racial and ethnic composition Note: the US Census treats Hispanic/Latino as an ethnic category. This table excludes Latinos from the racial categories and assigns them to a separate category. Hispanics/Latinos may be of any race.
Race / Ethnicity (NH = Non-Hispanic)	Pop 2010	Pop 2020	% 2010	% 2020
White alone (NH)	404	374	91.20%	89.05%
Black or African American alone (NH)	1	1	0.23%	0.24%
Native American or Alaska Native alone (NH)	8	12	1.81%	2.86%
Asian alone (NH)	1	0	0.23%	0.00%
Native Hawaiian or Pacific Islander alone (NH)	3	1	0.68%	0.24%
Other race alone (NH)	0	2	0.00%	0.48%
Mixed race or Multiracial (NH)	16	19	3.61%	4.52%
Hispanic or Latino (any race)	10	11	2.26%	2.62%
Total	443	420	100.00%	100.00%
