= Wild Boys of the Road =

1933 film by William A. Wellman

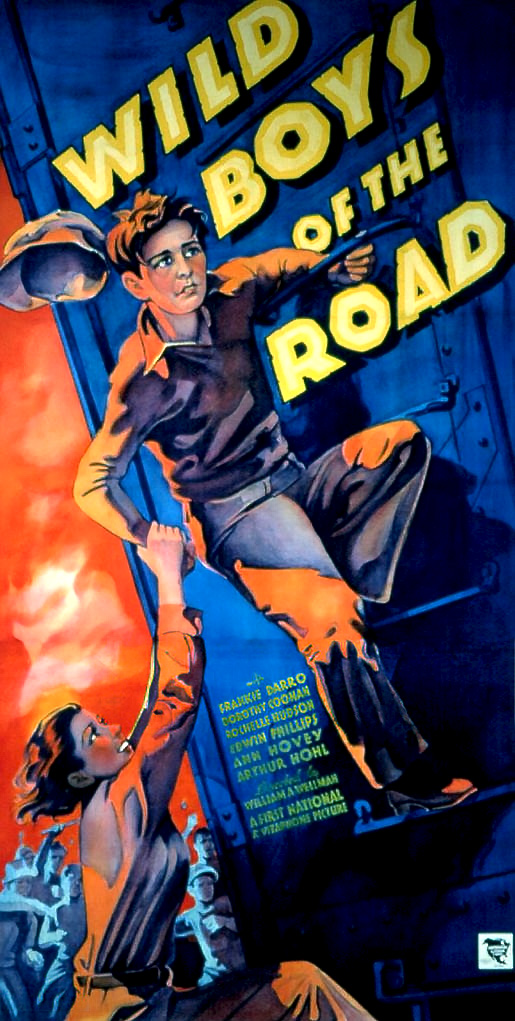
- Theatrical release poster
- Directed by: William A. Wellman
- Screenplay by: Earl Baldwin
- Story by: Daniel Ahearn
- Produced by: Robert Presnell Sr.
- Starring: Frankie Darro; Edwin Phillips; Dorothy Coonan
- Cinematography: Arthur L. Todd
- Edited by: Thomas Pratt
- Music by: Bernhard Kaun (uncredited)
- Production company: First National Pictures
- Distributed by: Warner Bros. Pictures
- Release date: October 7, 1933
- Running time: 67 minutes
- Language: English
- Budget: $203,000

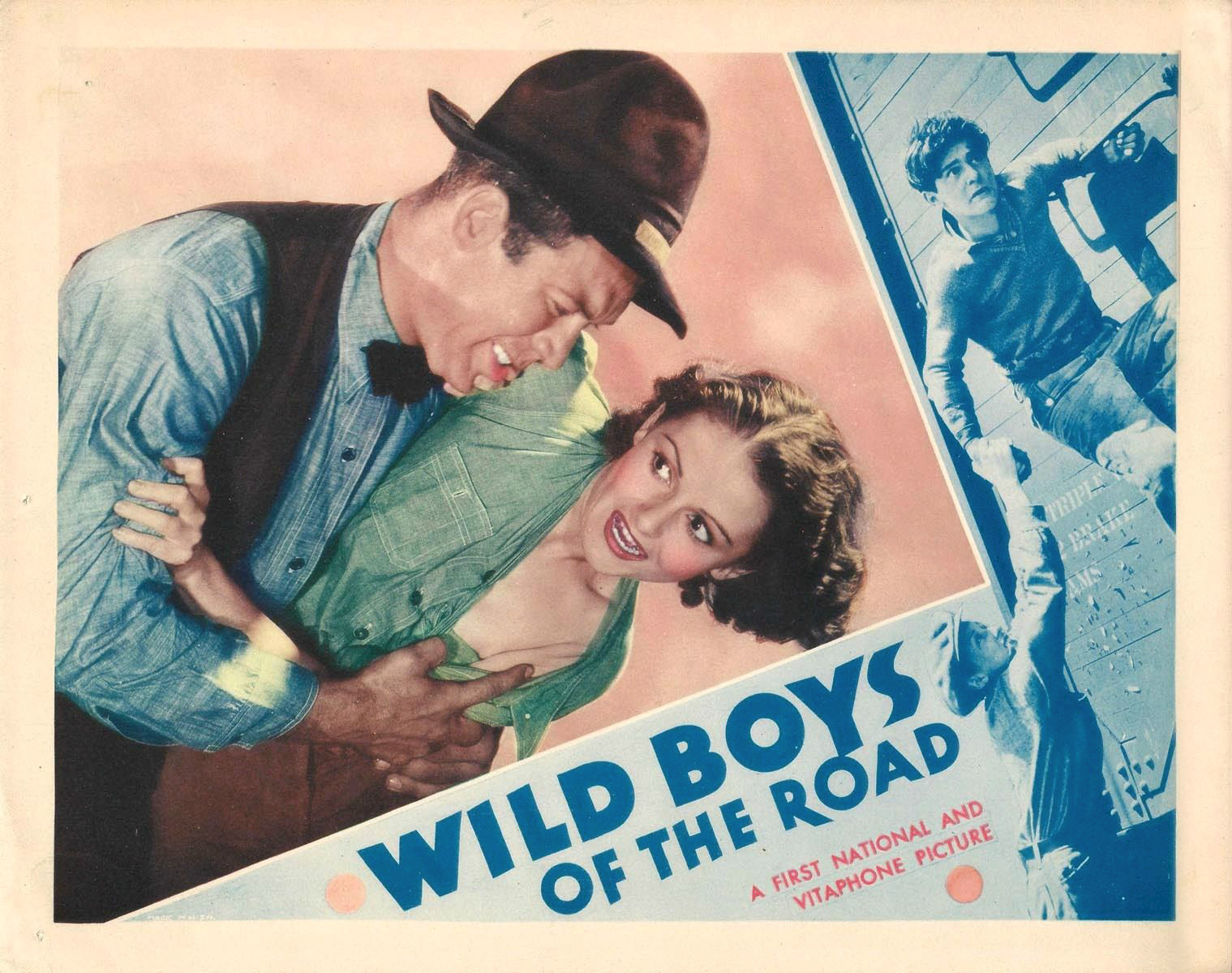
Pre-Code lobby card with Ward Bond and Ann Hovey depicting a sexual assault scene in the film. In spite of her rather brief appearance, Hovey was prominently featured in promotional advertising, while Bond was not even credited for his role of the brakeman.

Wild Boys of the Road is a 1933 pre-Code Depression-era American drama film directed by William A. Wellman and starring Frankie Darro, Edwin Phillips, and Dorothy Coonan. It tells the story of several teens forced into becoming hobos. The screenplay by Earl Baldwin is based on the story Desperate Youth by Daniel Ahearn. In 2013, the film was selected for preservation in the United States National Film Registry by the Library of Congress as being "culturally, historically, or aesthetically significant".

== Plot ==
In a Midwestern town one Saturday night during the depths of the Great Depression, high school sophomores Eddie Smith and Tommy Gordon get thrown out of a school dance when it is discovered that Tommy, unable to afford his ticket, snuck in. Tommy later reveals to Eddie that his widowed mother has not worked for months, so he is going to drop out of school and look for a job. Eddie offers to speak to his father about finding Tommy a position at the cement factory, only to discover, when he does, that his father has lost his own job there.

With work scarce and money running short, Eddie eventually sells his beloved jalopy to the junkyard, but the $22 does not cover the bills for long, and the Smiths are soon threatened with eviction. Things are no better at the Gordon household, so Eddie and Tommy decide to look for work in the city. They leave notes for their parents and jump on a freight train, where they meet Sally, another teenager, who is hoping she can stay with her aunt Carrie in Chicago to ease things on her widowed father and siblings.

The trio cross paths with many other teens in similarly dire straits, and, by the time they reach Chicago, there are dozens of vagrant teens riding on their train. The police meet them at the rail yard and round them up, informing the vagrants that the unemployment crisis has hit Chicago. Most of the teens are sent to detention, but Sally is released because she has a letter from her aunt, and she gets Eddie and Tommy released by claiming they are her cousins. Aunt Carrie gives Sally and her friends a warm welcome, but her apartment, which is a brothel, is promptly raided by police. The teens hastily climb out a window, and continue their rail journey eastward.

Outside of Columbus, Ohio, when the steam locomotive on which Eddie, Tommy, and Sally are riding stops to refill its water tank, railroad police officers kick them and their fellow travelers off. An older vagrant encourages them to fight back, and the teens manage to get back on the train by the time it pulls away. However, their victory celebration is cut short when it is discovered that, during the chaos, one girl was raped by the train brakeman. When the man returns, the teens mob him, and he falls off the moving train to his death. Panicked, everyone jumps off the train as it enters the Columbus rail yard. Tommy runs into a sign and hits his head, falling across the track in front of an oncoming train. Unable to crawl to safety in time, his leg gets run over and has to be amputated at the knee.

Sometime later, the teenage vagrants have established a "sewer pipe city" in Cleveland on a lot owned by a cement sewer pipe business. Although they have permission from the ownership to be there, there is public pressure to clear the camp, and things come to a head when Eddie steals an ill-fitting prosthetic leg for Tommy. An order is given for the teens to leave the city, and, when they resist, they are dispersed by a fire hose.

Eddie, Tommy, and Sally make their way to New York City, where they live in the garbage dump. One day, Eddie returns with the news that he has gotten a job running an elevator, but needs $3 for a uniform. The trio goes panhandling, and, when two men offer Eddie $5 to deliver a note to a movie theater cashier, he jumps at the chance. The note turns out to be a demand for money, however, and Eddie is arrested, and his friends are also hauled in when they protest. The judge cannot get any information out of them, particularly about their parents, but Eddie makes an embittered and emotional speech that moves the man. He not only dismisses the case, he promises to help them find work—on the condition that they return home once they can afford a ticket, as the judge is confident the New Deal will ease the financial difficulties faced by their families.

== Cast ==
- Frankie Darro as Eddie Smith
- Edwin Phillips as Tommy Gordon
- Rochelle Hudson as Grace, Eddie's date to the Sophomore Frolic
- Dorothy Coonan as Sally
- Sterling Holloway as Ollie, a vagrant boy
- Arthur Hohl as Dr. Henry A. Heckel
- Ann Hovey as Lola, the vagrant girl raped by the brakeman
- Minna Gombell as Carrie, Sally's aunt
- Grant Mitchell as Mr. James Smith, Eddie's father
- Claire McDowell as Mrs. Smith, Eddie's mother
- Robert Barrat as Judge R.H. White of the New York Superior Court, Juvenile Division
- Willard Robertson as the captain of detectives at the Chicago rail yard

Uncredited

- Marlo Dwyer as Harriet Webster, Tommy's date to the Sophomore Frolic
- Charley Grapewin as Mr. Cadmus, proprietor of the automobile junkyard
- Sidney Miller as the vagrant boy who sells the letter to Ollie
- Carl Gross as an African-American vagrant boy
- John Coonan as a vagrant boy in the line-up at the Chicago rail yard
- Buddy Messinger as a vagrant boy
- Raymond Borzage as the ill vagrant boy sent to the hospital at the Chicago rail yard
- Jack McHugh as Mac, a vagrant boy
- George Cooper as the older vagrant outside of Columbus who encourages the teens to fight their way back onto the train
- Ward Bond as the brakeman who rapes Lola
- Edwin Stanley as the merchant in Cleveland who calls for a police officer
- William Augustin as the police sergeant at the clearing of the sewer pipe city
- Adrian Morris as Buggie Maylin, the gangster who gets Eddie into trouble in New York
- Louis Natheaux as Buggie's associate

== Alternate ending ==
The ending of the film as released is not the one wanted by William A. Wellman and was imposed on him by producer Jack L. Warner. Originally, after Eddie's heartfelt cry in court, the judge explained to the three teenagers that the law left him no choice and announced their sentence. In the final scene, the judge looked out the window and tearfully watched as a police car took the teens away to be incarcerated.

Warner, finding the original ending too harsh and depressing for the public in the context of the time, and against Wellman's advice, forced the director to film a happy ending, in which the judge gives in, dismisses the case, and even promises to help the teenagers. The review of the film in the July 16, 1933, edition of the New York Times declared that the producers had "robbed [the film] of its values as a social challenge" by changing the ending.

== Reception ==
On the review aggregator website Rotten Tomatoes, 88% of 8 critics' reviews are positive.

== Accolades ==
In December 2013, the film was selected for preservation in the National Film Registry.

== See also ==
- Miss Nobody (1926), directed by Lambert Hillyer
- Beggars of Life (1928), directed by William A. Wellman
- National Recovery Administration (NRA), the logo of which is displayed at the start of film and in the courtroom scene
