= Good-bye, My Lady (film) =

1956 film by William A. Wellman

Good-bye, My Lady The Boy and the Laughing Dog
- 1956 Theatrical Poster
- Directed by: William A. Wellman
- Screenplay by: Sid Fleischman
- Based on: Good-bye, My Lady; 1954 novel by James Street
- Produced by: Robert Fellows
- Starring: Walter Brennan; Phil Harris; Brandon deWilde; Sidney Poitier; William Hopper; Louise Beavers
- Cinematography: William H. Clothier
- Edited by: Fred MacDowell
- Music by: Music composed and played by Laurindo Almeida – guitar A.S.C.A.P. George Fields – harmonica A.S.C.A.P.
- Production company: Batjac Productions
- Distributed by: Warner Bros. Pictures
- Release date: May 11, 1956
- Running time: 94 minutes
- Country: United States
- Language: English

Good-bye, My Lady is a 1956 American drama film adaptation of the novel Good-bye, My Lady (1954) by James H. Street. The book had been inspired by Street's original 1941 story which appeared in The Saturday Evening Post. Street was going to be the principal advisor on the film when he suddenly died of a heart attack. A boy learns what it means to be a man by befriending and training a stray Basenji dog and then is forced to surrender her to its rightful owner. Both readers of the story and film-goers found the boy's eventual loss of the dog unexpected.

Directed by William A. Wellman, the film starred Walter Brennan and Brandon deWilde, with Sidney Poitier and Phil Harris in supporting roles. Brennan and Harris previously co-starred in 1951's The Wild Blue Yonder, and Brennan and deWilde would reunite for the cameras in 1965 for Disney in Those Calloways. That same year, deWilde would play producer John Wayne's son in In Harm's Way. The film was produced by John Wayne's Batjac Productions.

== Plot ==
Young orphan boy Skeeter (Brandon deWilde) is being raised in a Mississippi swamp cabin by his poor and toothless Uncle Jesse Jackson (Walter Brennan). One night, a mysterious noise is heard. They later discover that the noise was caused by a strange breed of dog (My Lady of the Congo) they do not recognize. Rather than a bark, the dog has a yodel or laugh. The animal has keen senses, and they decide to train her for bird hunting.

In time, Skeeter learns that an ad had been placed for a female Basenji which had been lost in their swamp months earlier. Skeeter arranges for a telegram to be sent, and a representative (William Hopper) of the dog's rightful owner appears to take it back. Skeeter is forced to "come of age" and surrender the animal. With the $100 reward money given, he is able to purchase Jesse the false teeth that he needs and put a down payment on a 20 gauge shotgun.

== Cast ==
- Walter Brennan as Uncle Jesse Jackson
- Phil Harris as Cash Evans
- Brandon deWilde as Claude "Skeeter" Jackson
- Sidney Poitier as Gates Watson
- William Hopper as Walden Grover
- Louise Beavers as Bonnie Drew

== Production ==
There was one scene in the movie that director William A. Wellman thought was too slow. Rudi Fehr, the head of the post-production department, suggested to cut the whole scene. Although Wellman defended that scene as having a funny moment, Rudi replied "Better lose a laugh than lose the audience!" In a 1971 interview with American Cinema Editors, Jack L. Warner remarked of Fehr "That's pretty good for a kid from Berlin."

=== The dog ===
Chosen for the film was My Lady of the Congo, a six-month-old Basenji puppy of Miss Veronica Tudor-Williams of Molesey, England. My Lady was flown to Hollywood, to be followed later by four young dogs as doubles, including her little brother My Lord of the Congo and Flageolet of the Congo, subsequently an International Champion. As it was, My Lady wound up doing most of the scenes. When not filming with then 13-year-old deWilde, the dog spent all her time with him, and an attachment developed between them. Unknown to theater-goers that saw boy and dog parted in the film was that the written agreement supplying the animal stated that My Lady would become the personal property of Brandon deWilde upon completion of filming.

The rare breed of dog had been unknown to most Americans. Affected by either the story, the novel or the movie, many people were inclined to become Basenji owners at this time.

== Music ==
Song: "When Your Boy Becomes a Man". Music by Don Powell, lyrics by Moris Erby.

== Home media ==
Good-bye, My Lady was originally released on VHS in the United States by Warner Home Video, on December 13, 1993. On December 10, 2010, Warner Archive Collection released Good-bye, My Lady as a manufactured on-demand remastered wide-screen DVD-R release.

In an interview for Turner Classic Movies, Gretchen Wayne, the daughter-in-law of John Wayne and current president of Batjac Productions, was asked about a DVD. "I'm not sure who owns Good-bye, My Lady -- it might be Warner Brothers. It's a charming story and it should be released," she said.

== See also ==
- List of American films of 1956
