= The Adventures of Bullwhip Griffin =

1967 film by James Neilson

- Theatrical release poster
- Directed by: James Neilson
- Screenplay by: Lowell S. Hawley
- Based on: By the Great Horn Spoon! by Sid Fleischman
- Produced by: Walt Disney
- Starring: Roddy McDowall; Suzanne Pleshette; Karl Malden
- Cinematography: Edward Colman
- Edited by: Marsh Hendry
- Music by: Songs: Richard M. Sherman; Robert B. Sherman; Mel Leven; George Bruns; Score: George Bruns
- Production company: Walt Disney Productions
- Distributed by: Buena Vista Distribution
- Release date: June 15, 1967
- Running time: 111 minutes
- Country: United States
- Language: English
- Box office: $1,900,000 (US/ Canada)

The Adventures of Bullwhip Griffin is a 1967 American Western comedy film directed by James Neilson, produced by Walt Disney Productions, and starring Roddy McDowall, Suzanne Pleshette, Hermione Baddeley, and Karl Malden. The film's screenplay, by Lowell S. Hawley, was based on the novel By the Great Horn Spoon! by Sid Fleischman. The songs were written by Richard M. Sherman and Robert B. Sherman and the theme song was written by Mel Leven and George Bruns, the latter of whom also composed the film's score. It was the fifth and final film Neilson directed for Disney.

== Plot ==
Jack and Arabella Flagg are orphaned in Boston in 1849. Seeking adventure in the California gold rush, Jack stows away aboard a ship bound for San Francisco, with the family butler Eric Griffin inadvertently along for the voyage. Griffin ingratiates himself with the ship's captain by working as his cook and servant.

The swindler and thief Judge Higgins steals a map to a gold mine from Quentin Bartlett, an actor among the ship's passengers. Griffin, Jack, and Quentin pursue the crooked judge. Arabella also makes her way to San Francisco, eventually taking a job performing in a dance hall saloon.

Griffin encounters the stocky bully Mountain Ox, and delivers a punch that flattens the giant, earning him the "Bullwhip" moniker. Inspired by the incident, Bullwhip later enters a prizefighting match, ultimately winning both the money and Arabella's affection. Caught trying to steal the fight's receipts, Judge Higgins quivers behind bars as a lynch mob forms outside. The ensuing riot causes a fire that destroyed much of the city, but Bullwhip uses his winnings to rebuild San Francisco better than before, making him a local hero.

== Cast ==
- Roddy McDowall as Eric "Bullwhip" Griffin
- Suzanne Pleshette as Arabella Flagg
- Bryan Russell as Jack Flagg
- Karl Malden as Judge Higgins
- Harry Guardino as Sam Trimble
- Richard Haydn as Quentin Bartlett
- Mike Mazurki as Mountain Ox
- Hermione Baddeley as Miss Irene Chesney
- Alan Carney as Joe Turner
- Liam Redmond as Captain Swain
- Cecil Kellaway as Mr. Pemberton
- Joby Baker as Bandido Leader
- Parley Baer as Chief Executioner
- Arthur Hunnicutt as Referee
- Dub Taylor as Timekeeper
- Pedro Gonzalez Gonzalez as Bandido
- John Qualen as Barber
- Jimmy MacDonald as Saloon Percussionist

Tony Hancock was cast in this film, but was sacked during production due to his erratic behaviour. He was replaced by Richard Haydn.

== Reception ==
The film holds a score of 50% on Rotten Tomatoes based on eight reviews.

=== Critical response ===
Howard Thompson of The New York Times graded the film as "Okay, no more", adding, "as a Western spoof, the picture is slow, overdrawn, and tame to the point of gentility. Surely young Disney fans wouldn't have cringed at some slambang, Gold Rush vigor, plus a little 'Ruggles of Red Gap' flavoring." Arthur D. Murphy of Variety called the film "a lively, entertaining comedy spoof of the California Gold Rush era. Zesty direction, wild performances, firstrate production values and broad comedy angles make this Walt Disney production particularly strong for all age audiences." Kevin Thomas of the Los Angeles Times wrote: "Everyone turns in winning performances, but they don't get much help from Lowell S. Hawley's routine script, which too often emphasizes dialog at the expense of action, or from James Neilson's equally pedestrian direction." The Monthly Film Bulletin stated: "A pity that some scenes are played for more than they are worth, but there's enough liveliness here to keep all but the most sophisticated youngsters happy."

== Content edits ==
For the film's streaming release, Disney+ overdubbed the term "coolie" from dialogue referring to a character's disguise.

== See also ==
- List of American films of 1967
