= Hazel Flagg =

- Original cast recording
- Music: Jule Styne
- Lyrics: Bob Hilliard
- Book: Ben Hecht, based on a story by James H. Street
- Basis: Film Nothing Sacred
- Productions: 1953 Broadway

Hazel Flagg is a 1953 musical, book by Ben Hecht, based on a story by James H. Street. The lyrics are by Bob Hilliard, and music by Jule Styne. The musical is based on the 1937 screwball comedy film Nothing Sacred, the primary screenwriter of which was Ben Hecht.

== Production ==
The musical opened on Broadway at the Mark Hellinger Theatre on February 11 and closed on September 19, 1953, after 190 performances. Direction was by David Alexander, with musical staging by Robert Alton and costumes by Miles White.

The cast included Helen Gallagher (Hazel), John Howard (Wallace Cook), Thomas Mitchell (Dr. Downer), Benay Venuta (Laura Carew), Jack Whiting (mayor of New York), Ross Martin (Dr. Egelhofer), Jonathan Harris (Oleander), Sheree North in her Broadway debut (Whitey), and John Brascia (Willie).

Paramount Pictures, which owned the rights to the source material for Nothing Sacred, also acquired the rights to produce a film version of Hazel Flagg. The Dean Martin and Jerry Lewis film Living It Up (1954) is based on the musical, with Hazel Flagg rewritten as a man, Homer Flagg (played by Lewis) and Wallace Cook rewritten as a woman, Wally Cook (played by Janet Leigh). The one hit song from Hazel Flagg, "Every Street's a Boulevard in Old New York", was performed in this movie by Martin and Lewis.

== Plot synopsis ==
Wallace Cook, a writer for Everywhere magazine, suggests that his editor should run an article about small-town girl Hazel Flagg, purportedly dying from exposure to radium. Cook invites her to New York City for an interview. After accepting, she discovers that she was misdiagnosed, but eager to visit the big city, decides not to reveal the truth, and becomes a media darling embraced by a public deeply moved by her sad story.

== Song list ==
Sources: Dietz, Dan (2014) The Complete Book of 1950s Broadway Musicals; Guide to Musical Theatre website

Act I

- A Little More Heart—Laura Carew, Wallace Cook and Magazine Staff
- The World Is Beautiful Today—Hazel Flagg
- I'm Glad I'm Leaving—Hazel Flagg
- The Rutland Bounce—Vermont Villager, Man on the Street, Dancer and Villagers
- Hello Hazel—Laura Carew and New Yorkers
- Paris Gown (ballet) -- Hazel Flagg, Maximilian Lavian, Dancers, Models and Attendants
- The World Is Beautiful Today—Wallace Cook and Editors
- Every Street's a Boulevard in Old New York—Mayor of New York
- How Do You Speak to an Angel—Wallace Cook
- Autograph Chant—Autograph Hunters
- I Feel Like I'm Gonna Live Forever—Hazel Flagg
- You're Gonna Dance With Me, Willie—Hazel Flagg, Willie and Company

Act II

- Who Is the Bravest? -- University Glee Club
- Dream Parade (ballet)-- Hazel Flagg and Company
- Salome—Dancing Girls, Salome, Cowboy Singer and Cowboy Dancers
- Everybody Loves To Take a Bow—Laura Carew, Mayor of New York and Men
- Laura De Maupassant—Hazel Flagg
- Autograph Chant (Reprise) -- Autograph Hunters
- I Feel Like I'm Gonna Live Forever (Reprise) -- Company
- How Do you Speak to an Angel (Reprise) -- Company

== Awards ==
- 1953 Tony Award for Best Actor in a Musical (Thomas Mitchell)
- 1953 Tony Award for Best Costume Design (Play or Musical) (Miles White)
- 1953 Theatre World Award (Sheree North)
