= The Whipping Boy =

1986 children's novel by Sid Fleischman

- First edition cover of The Whipping Boy
- Author: Sid Fleischman
- Illustrator: Peter Sís
- Language: English
- Genre: Children's novel
- Publisher: Greenwillow Books
- Publication date: April 1986; 40 years ago
- Publication place: United States
- Media type: Print (Hardback & Paperback)
- Pages: 89
- ISBN: 0-688-06216-4
- OCLC: 12421157
- LC Class: PZ7.F5992 Wh 1986

The Whipping Boy is a Newbery Medal-winning children's book by Sid Fleischman, first published in 1986.

== Plot summary ==
Prince Horace, also known as Prince Brat, frequently misbehaves. Since he is a prince, no one can raise a finger against him. Therefore, his family provides him with a whipping boy, Jemmy, an orphaned boy who is punished in place of the prince. Though he has learned to read, write, and do mathematics while living in the castle, Jemmy is beaten several times a day and longs for the freedom he had on the streets. When the prince decides to run away on a whim, he demands that Jemmy act as his servant during his journey. While on the run, the boys are picked up by two notorious highwaymen, Hold-Your-Nose Billy and Cutwater, who hatch a scheme to ransom the prince. Jemmy talks them into believing that he is the prince, and sets into motion a plan of escape. The prince misunderstands Jemmy's intentions and betrays him. Nonetheless, the boys escape. They come across a girl named Betsy searching for her lost dancing bear, Petunia, and she directs them to the river where they find a kind man with a wagon full of potatoes. The boys help the man—whose name is Captain Nips—get his wagon out from the mud, and in return, the potato man gives the boys, the girl, and the bear a lift to the fair, but they are soon intercepted by the highwaymen. Still believing Jemmy is the prince, and believing it to be a crime worse than murder to beat the prince, they beat Horace instead.

Petunia scares the highwaymen away, and everyone arrives at the fair. Betsy earns a few coins with her bear, Captain Nips boils the potatoes and sells them, and Horace and Jemmy head down to the sewer to catch some rats. On their way, they hear some people talking about the missing prince—one woman makes a remark about how much worse things will be when the prince becomes king. Horace's feelings are hurt very deeply, but he does not show his emotions. When the boys learn that the king has posted a reward for the whipping boy, who has been accused of kidnapping the prince, they go into the sewers where they see the highwaymen. They trick the highwaymen into the most dangerous sewer, where rats attack them. Afterward, the prince decides that he wants to finally go home. When they return to Captain Nips, Horace reveals himself as a prince and suggests that the potato man collect the reward for capturing the whipping boy. Although Horace tries to explain the entire escapade to the king, Jemmy is ultimately pardoned, and the prince and Jemmy live happily ever after as the best of friends in the castle. Hold-Your-Nose Billy and Cutwater eventually escape the sewers, but mistakenly board a ship that goes to a prison island.

== Film adaptation ==
Fleischman's book was adapted in the 1994 Disney Channel television film Prince Brat and the Whipping Boy starring Truan Munro, Nic Knight, George C. Scott, Vincent Schiavelli, Mathilda May, and Kevin Conway, and directed by Sydney MacArtney. Sid Fleischman wrote the teleplay and the film won a CableACE Award that year.

== Musical adaptation ==
In 2016, a musical adaptation was reported to be in the works with music by Drew Gasparini and book by Alex Brightman, with both contributing to lyrics.

== Awards and nominations ==
The Whipping Boy won the Newbery Medal in 1987.

== See also ==
- The Prince and the Pauper

Awards
Preceded by Sarah, Plain and Tall	Newbery Medal recipient 1987	Succeeded by Lincoln: A Photobiography
