= Good-bye, My Lady =

1954 novel by James H. Street

- First edition
- Author: James H. Street
- Language: English
- Publisher: J. B. Lippincott & Co.
- Publication date: June 1954
- Publication place: United States
- Media type: Print (hardback & paperback)
- Pages: 222 pp

Good-bye, My Lady is a novel by James H. Street about a boy and his dog. It was published by J. B. Lippincott Company in June 1954 and reprinted in paperback by Pocket Books in February 1978. It is based on Street's short story "Weep No More, My Lady", which was published in the 6 December 1941 issue of The Saturday Evening Post.

The novel was made into a film of the same name in 1956.

== Plot summary ==
Skeeter is a 14-year-old orphan who lives with his uncle Jesse in a one-room shack in the swamps of the Pascagoula River in Mississippi. He has heard the sound of a strange animal in the swamp near their shack, and one summer evening he convinces his uncle to help him go out and find it. When they do, they see it is a small animal with short red and white fur that makes a chuckling yodel sound and cleans itself like a cat. Jesse is unsure what the animal is, but Skeeter is convinced it is a dog.

The next day, Jesse's friend Alpheus "Cash" Evans, owner of the general store in the nearby village of Lystra, comes to help Skeeter and Jesse track down the animal. With Evans is his tracking dog Gabe and two vicious hog dogs named Bark and Bellow whom he keeps leashed. Evans releases Gabe at the spot where Skeeter and Jesse saw the animal, and Gabe eventually picks up its scent and starts tracking it. As they listen to Gabe tracking the animal it becomes clear that it is outrunning Gabe. It bursts into the clearing, and Evans releases Bark and Bellow. When the animal stands its ground and fights back against the hog dogs, Evans calls them off and allows it to escape. He acknowledges that Skeeter was right - the animal is a dog.

The following day, Skeeter sets out to tame the dog. He is able to locate it, and it proves to be a friendly female who allows him to leash her and bring her with him to the shack. Jesse convinces Skeeter to let her off her leash, and she remains with them. Skeeter decides to name the dog Lady.

Skeeter and Jesse take Lady out with them, and when Lady flushes a covey of quail Skeeter becomes determined to train her as a bird dog. However, Lady's behavior makes it clear that she is someone else's dog, and Skeeter fears that Evans will discover who her real owner is.

Skeeter is horrified when Lady chases and kills a water rat, something no true bird dog will stoop to. He ties the half-eaten rat around her neck, and brings her back to the shack. There, he find Evans visiting with an English Setter he has just purchased. Evans had planned to give his new dog to Jesse and Skeeter to train (for which he intended to pay them three dollars a week), but seeing Lady with her rat causes him to change his mind. When Skeeter apologizes afterwards, Jesse shrugs it off and tells him to concentrate on training Lady.

Within a few months, Skeeter has trained Lady to cast and point like a proper bird dog. A visiting Evans sees Lady pointing at a clump of sage fifty yards away and refuses to believe she has detected birds from so far away. Jesse wagers the cost of a sawblade Evans had given him on credit that Lady is indeed pointing birds. Skeeter is privately dubious, but Jesse wins his bet when a covey of quail break from the sage.

Evans is impressed, and he spreads the word about Skeeter's remarkable dog. In time, Evans hears from a traveling salesman out of Mobile, Alabama that a kennel in Connecticut lost a Basenji near Pascagoula. The description of the lost dog, named Isis of the Blue Nile, matches Lady. A sorrowful Evans tells Jesse, who passes the word on to Skeeter. When Lady responds to the name Isis, Skeeter knows he has the lost Basenji, and decides to return her to her rightful owner. A wire is sent to the kennel, and a man named Walden Grover flies down from Connecticut to take possession of Lady.

Skeeter himself must put Lady in the crate in Grover's pickup truck, then watch as Grover drives off with her. Evans then asks Skeeter to finish training his English Setter, and the boy accepts. With the $100 reward Grover gave him, the boy buys his toothless uncle a set of false teeth, and puts a down payment on a 20 gauge shotgun for himself.

== Major themes ==
Good-Bye, My Lady is a coming of age story. When Skeeter tames Lady, Jesse acknowledges the boy's right to keep her, and defers to Skeeter in all matters concerning Lady. Skeeter's growing maturity is also marked by his uncle's willingness to allow him to drink coffee, which is regarded as an adult beverage. As the novel opens, Skeeter is not permitted to drink coffee. After he tames Lady, his uncle allows him heavily creamed coffee, and after he allows Grover to take Lady away, Jesse tells Evans that Skeeter (whom he now refers to by his given name, Claude) drinks his coffee black.

James Street, a native of Mississippi, was politically liberal, and his fiction often involved an attempt to reconcile his heritage with his liberal views on race. Good-Bye, My Lady includes an African-American family, the Watsons, who own a 60-acre (240,000 m^{2}) farm across the river from Jesse and Skeeter. The Watsons' eldest son, Gates, is a college graduate. Towards the end of the novel Skeeter learns that Gates Watson knew all along where Lady came from, and also about the reward for her return, but remained silent out of friendship for Skeeter.

== Inspiration and 1942 sequel ==
English Basenji breeder Veronica Tudor-Williams tells of a letter she received from Street in 1942 saying that he first got the idea of writing about a Basenji after seeing a photograph of Veronica Tudor-Williams with some Basenjis in an American magazine. He also wrote that the reader reaction from his first story was so strong that he wrote a sequel, "Please Come Home, My Lady", reuniting Skeeter with Lady. "Please Come Home, My Lady" appeared in the 11 April 1942 issue of The Saturday Evening Post.

== 1956 film ==
After Street's death, Warner Bros. pictures began production of a film version of the novel, starring Brandon deWilde as Skeeter, Walter Brennan as Uncle Jesse, Phil Harris as Cash Evans, and Sidney Poitier as Gates Watson. The film was produced by John Wayne's Batjac Productions, directed by William A. Wellman, and the screenplay was written by Albert Sidney Fleishman. Veronica Tudor-Williams provided the Basenji, named My Lady of the Congo, who played Lady in the film, and also provided four additional dogs to serve as "doubles" for My Lady. After filming ended, My Lady was adopted by deWilde, and the other dogs were adopted by various members of the film crew. The film version was released on 12 May 1956. It has also appeared under the titles Goodbye, My Lady and The Boy and the Laughing Dog.

Good-Bye, My Lady was released by Warner Home Video on VHS on 13 December 1993. The film was released on DVD in December 2010.
