= Leno Prestini =

American painter

Untitled - '52, by Leno Prestini. Property of Clayton/Deer Park Historical Society.

Leno Prestini (1906–1963) was an American painter and sculptor who was active from the 1920s through the early 1960s, mainly in the small town of Clayton, Washington. He worked as a professional terra cotta sculptor, creating architectural ornaments, and had many other interests as well. His skillfully rendered paintings, though reflecting contemporary trends such as Surrealism and Social Realism, were at times unique to the point of eccentricity. His work received limited acclaim in his lifetime, but has been the subject of several exhibitions, and has continued to attract attention since his death in 1963.

== Life and career ==
=== Early life ===
Leno Prestini was born Feb. 4, 1906, in the village of Besano in northern Italy, near the Swiss border. His parents, Luigi and Caterina Prestini, lived and worked in Switzerland for extended periods. In 1907 Luigi Prestini moved to the United States, finding work as a stonecutter in the granite quarries of Barre, Vermont; a year later, Leno, his mother, and his older brother Battista (b. 1905) followed. In 1911 the family relocated to Eastern Washington, joining a community of Italian-American artisans who worked for the Washington Brick Company in the town of Clayton, near Spokane. The company was renowned for the high quality of its handcrafted terra cotta cornices and decorative panels. Luigi Prestini worked at the plant until he died of pneumonia, following stomach surgery, in 1919; eventually, both Battista and Leno dropped out of high school and began working there.

Leno Prestini had shown artistic talent from an early age. By 1931 he was the company's chief modeler, creating distinctive architectural ornaments (which can still be seen on many buildings around the Pacific Northwest) and designing decorative tiles, which were marketed under the 'WACO' trade name. He had also developed a reputation as an eccentric and adventurous character, filling his free time with, among many other things, mountain climbing and exploring the bottoms of local lakes in a homemade diving suit.

=== Artist ===
During the Great Depression, Prestini was sometimes laid off by Washington Brick & Lime for several months at a time. For a couple of years he drifted and worked odd jobs in Chicago, San Francisco, Mexico, Hawaii, and various other places. Although he had long been sculpting original terra cotta art pieces, he didn't begin painting seriously until his return to Clayton in 1936. He was likely inspired in part by Charles Sater, a fellow terra cotta modeler who did religious-themed oil paintings. Prestini's early work was in the Regionalist style popular at the time, but had a strange, dark cast, reflecting his deep forebodings over the growth of mechanization and the rise of fascism in Europe. In 1940 a series of paintings he called the Pages of History was briefly displayed in the windows of a downtown Spokane stationery store before public complaints over their grim content led to their removal. These same works were better received when he took them to Los Angeles, earning a laudatory article in the Sunday Los Angeles Times.

With the advent of American involvement in World War II, Prestini joined the Army Air Corps, enlisting in September 1942. Although his age and his weight of 105 lbs. precluded him from combat duty, he served with the 8th Air Force in England, likely painting insignia and nose art. At war's end he returned to Clayton, where the local economy was struggling. The terra cotta plant closed for good in 1947, killed by changing architectural trends and stricter building codes. Prestini worked as a bricklayer and stonemason, building fireplaces for cabins in the area, but began pouring much of his energy into painting. His post-war work is generally more colorful and a little less heavy-handed than the Pages of History, sometimes displaying playful Surrealist elements, but it shows a more personalized torment. Prestini was generally known in Clayton as a friendly, energetic, and talkative character, and his works were hung with pride in local shops and taverns; however, he also had what his brother Battista called "bad nervous spells", during which he suffered from deep depression. Some of his paintings are beautifully rendered Western scenes, or relatively straightforward depictions of local history and culture, intended for a more general audience, but the paintings which meant most to him were the ones he called his "thought" pieces, and these are sometimes harrowing, plainly showing his inner conflicts, fears, and frustrations. Prestini's romantic disappointments are particularly clear in his portrayals of women.

Untitled oil painting, 1958, Leno Prestini. Property of Clayton and Deer Park Historical Society.

Prestini's studio - a remodeled garage adjacent to the house he shared with his mother - was a local landmark, with visitors and neighborhood kids stopping by to watch him paint, as he listened to country music and chattered away. His 'Western' art was popular, and by the late 1950s his more serious work was also gaining some attention. Articles about him appeared in the Spokane Spokesman-Review and other papers, and in 1960 an exhibition of fifty of his paintings was held at Gonzaga University. In 1961 his work was shown in Colville, at the Corbin Art Center in Spokane, and at Eastern Washington University in Cheney. However, he remained largely unknown outside of Eastern Washington.

=== Final years ===
In 1961 his mother, who he had lived with most of his life, died after a long illness. Prestini generally maintained his outward cheer, but during a March 1963 visit to his brother Battista, then living in California, he was visibly distraught. Battista alerted friends and local law enforcement in Clayton to Leno's condition, but shortly after he returned home, Prestini shot himself in the head. He died a month later, on April 26, 1963, at a care facility in Spokane. He was 57.

== Legacy ==
In the early 1970s Battista Prestini, with the support of the community, built a small museum in Clayton, dedicated to his brother's work. After Battista's death in 1983, most of the material (including tiles, sculptures, World War II-era cartoons, and 70 paintings) was donated to the Stevens County Historical Society in Colville, Washington. Prestini's large Clay to Clay mural is permanently housed at the Loon Lake Historical Society; other paintings and related works are at the Clayton/Deer Park Historical Society.

Paintings, sculpture, and diving gear created by Prestini were featured in the Northwest Museum of Art and Culture's 2002 Small Towns exhibit in Spokane.

Terra cotta works (architectural) by Prestini: Moose Lodge (Clayton, Wash.); Felts Field Air National Guard Hangar, the Paulsen Medical and Dental Building, Davenport Hotel, The Rookery Building (Spokane, Wash.); Martin Hall - EWU campus (Cheney, Wash.).

Other works: Pioneers Memorial, glazed tile mural, Stevens County Courthouse (Colville, Wash.), ca. 1938. In 1965 a 60-foot totem pole carved by Prestini was donated to the Spokane Interstate Fair.
