= Robert Carson (writer) =

American writer (1909–1983)

- Born: October 6, 1909; Clayton, Washington
- Died: January 19, 1983 (aged 73); Los Angeles, California

Robert Carson (October 6, 1909, Clayton, Washington – January 19, 1983, Los Angeles, California) was an American film and television screenwriter, novelist, and short story writer, who won an Academy Award in 1938 for his screenplay of A Star Is Born. He was married to Mary Jane Irving, a former child actress.

== Film screenwriting credits ==
- A Star Is Born (1937). Academy Award for best writing, original story, shared with William A. Wellman. Nominated for best writing, screenplay, shared with Alan Campbell and Dorothy Parker.
- The Last Gangster (1937)
- Men with Wings (1938)
- Beau Geste (1939)
- The Light That Failed (1939)
- Western Union (1941)
- The Desperadoes (1943)
- Once More, My Darling (1949)
- Just for You (1952)
- Bundle of Joy (1956)

== Television screenwriting credits ==
- Westinghouse Studio One, 1948 (various episodes)

== Bibliography ==
- The Revels Are Ended (1936). Doubleday.
- "Aloha Means Goodbye", a serialized short novel about a Japanese attack on Pearl Harbor, published in The Saturday Evening Post in June/July 1941, six months before the actual attack occurred. The story was the basis for the film Across the Pacific (1942).
- Stranger in Our Midst (1947). G.P. Putnam. Reprinted 1953, Popular Library.
- The Magic Lantern (1952), a fictionalized account of Hollywood. Henry Holt
- The Quality of Mercy (1954). Henry Holt.
- Love Affair (1958). Henry Holt. reprinted 1959, Popular Library.
- My Hero (1961) McGraw Hill. Reprinted 1962, Crest Books
- An End to Comedy (1963) Bobbs-Merrill
- The Outsiders (1966), Little, Brown. Reprinted 1970, Coronet
- Jellybean (1974), a civil war period western. Little, Brown ISBN 0-316-13026-5
