= The Story of G.I. Joe =

1945 film by William A. Wellman

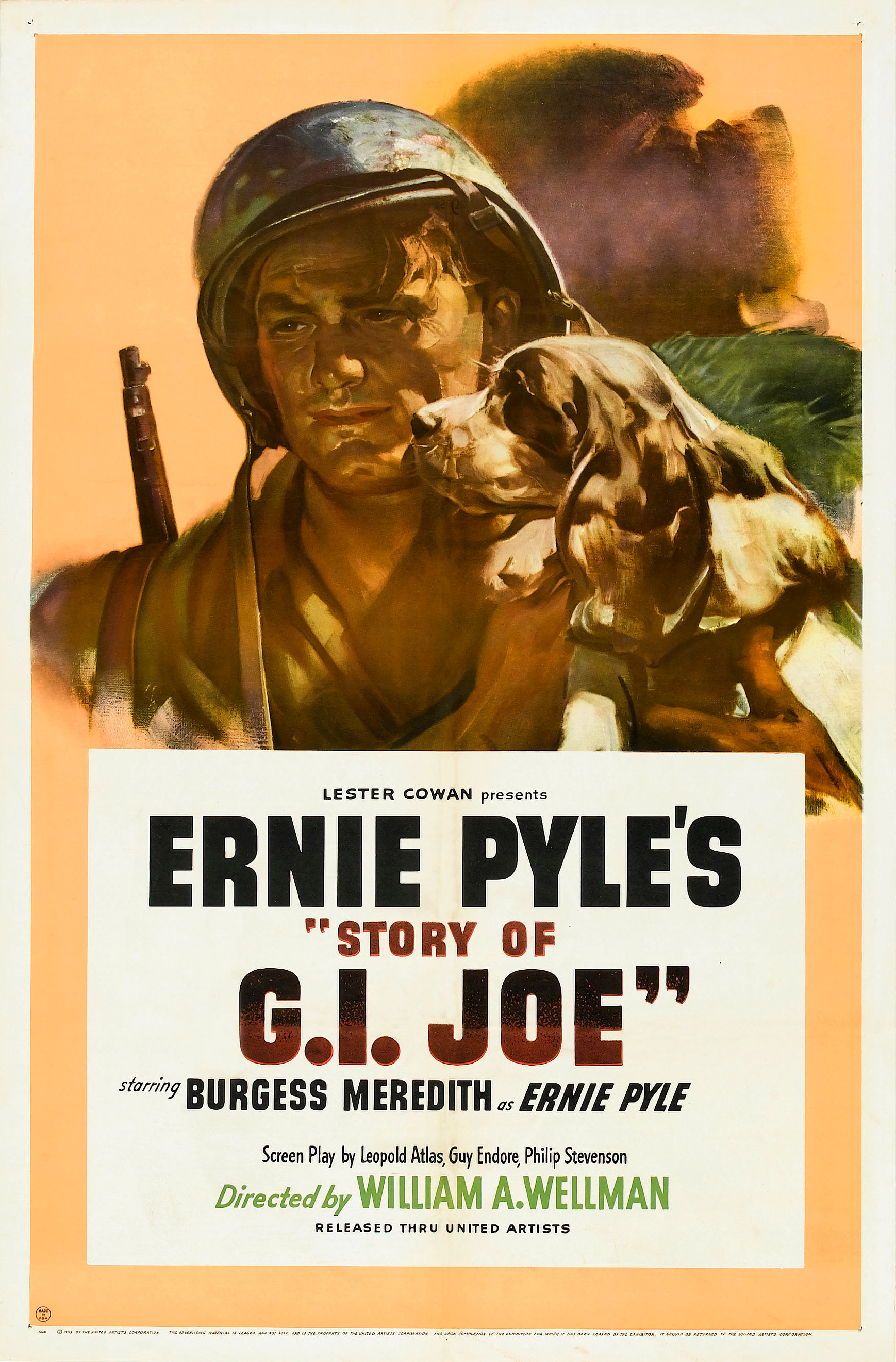
- Theatrical release poster
- Directed by: William A. Wellman
- Screenplay by: Leopold Atlas; Guy Endore; Philip Stevenson
- Based on: Here Is Your War (1943 book); Brave Men (1944 book) by Ernie Pyle
- Produced by: Lester Cowan
- Starring: Burgess Meredith; Robert Mitchum
- Cinematography: Russell Metty
- Edited by: Albrecht Joseph
- Music by: Louis Applebaum; Ann Ronell
- Production companies: Lester Cowan Productions, Inc.
- Distributed by: United Artists
- Release date: June 18, 1945
- Running time: 108 minutes
- Country: United States
- Language: English
- Budget: $1.2 million
- Box office: $2.5 million (US)

The Story of G.I. Joe (also known as Ernie Pyle's Story of G.I. Joe and G.I. Joe) is a 1945 American war film directed by William A. Wellman, starring Burgess Meredith and Robert Mitchum. The story is a tribute to the American infantryman (colloquially called 'G.I. Joe') during World War II, told through the eyes of Pulitzer Prize-winning war correspondent Ernie Pyle (played by Meredith), with dialogue and narration lifted from Pyle's columns. The film concentrates on one company (C Company, 18th Infantry) that Pyle accompanies into combat in Tunisia and Italy.

The film was released by United Artists on June 18, 1945. It was a critical and commercial success was nominated for four Academy Awards, including Mitchum's only career Oscar nomination (for Best Supporting Actor). In 2009, the film was selected for preservation in the National Film Registry by the Library of Congress for being "culturally, historically or aesthetically" significant.

== Plot ==
The untested infantrymen of C Company, 18th Infantry, U.S. Army, board trucks to travel to the front for the first time. Lt. Bill Walker allows war correspondent Ernie Pyle, himself a rookie to combat, to accompany them. Ernie follows the men all the way to the front lines through the rain and mud.

Ernie comes to know the men about whom he will write, including Sgt. Warnicki and privates Dondaro, Mew and Murphy.

Their baptism by fire occurs at the Battle of Kasserine Pass, a bloody chaotic defeat. Pyle is present at battalion headquarters when Walker arrives as a runner for his company commander. Ernie and the company part ways, but months later he seeks to find them, as he believes that they are the finest outfit in the army. He finds them on a road in Italy, about to attack a German-held town. Ernie finds that Company C has become proficient at killing without remorse. In house-to-house combat, they capture the town. After arrangements are made for Murphy to marry his nurse fiancée, a fatigued Ernie struggles to stay awake during the ceremony.

The company advances to a position in front of Monte Cassino, but, unable to advance, they are soon reduced to living in caves dug in the ground, persistent rain and mud, endless patrols and savage artillery barrages. When his men are forced to eat cold rations for Christmas dinner, Walker obtains food for them at gunpoint. Casualties are heavy, and young replacements are quickly killed before they can learn how to survive in combat. Walker is always short of lieutenants, and the veterans lose men, including Murphy. After a night patrol to capture a prisoner, Warnicki suffers a nervous breakdown and is sent to the infirmary. Ernie returns to the correspondents' quarters to write a piece on Murphy's death and is told by his fellow reporters that he has won the Pulitzer Prize for his combat reporting. Ernie again connects with the outfit after Cassino is finally taken. His reunion with the men is interrupted when a string of mules is led to them, each carrying the dead body of a G.I. to be placed on the ground. A final mule, led by Dondaro, bears the body of Walker. The soldiers express their grief in the presence of Walker's corpse.

Ernie joins the company as it proceeds down the road, narrating its conclusion: "For those beneath the wooden crosses, there is nothing we can do, except perhaps to pause and murmur, 'Thanks pal, thanks.'"

== Cast ==
Credits from the AFI Catalog of Feature Films:

- Burgess Meredith as Ernie Pyle
- Robert Mitchum as Lt./Capt. Bill Walker
- Freddie Steele as Sgt. Steve Warnicki
- Wally Cassell as Pvt. Dondaro
- Jimmy Lloyd as Pvt. Spencer
- John R. Reilly as Pvt. Robert "Wingless" Murphy
- William Murphy as Pvt. Charles R. Mew

Uncredited

- William Self as Pvt. Cookie Henderson
- William Benedict as Pvt. Whitey
- Tito Renaldo as Pvt. Lopez
- Dorothy Coonan Wellman as Nurse Lt. Elizabeth 'Red' Murphy
- Bob Hope as himself (voice)
- Shelley Mitchell as Axis Sally (voice)
- Yolanda Lacca as Amelia

=== Casting notes ===
Casting for the role of Pyle began in June 1944. Pyle had pleaded: "For God's sake, don't let them make me look like a fool." Producer Lester Cowan considered James Gleason and Walter Brennan for the lead role but selected Meredith because he was lesser known. Meredith had been serving as a captain in the Army, and the Army refused to release him from active duty. According to Meredith, the Army was overruled by presidential advisor Harry Hopkins, and his honorable discharge from the Army was approved personally by General George C. Marshall. Meredith spent time with Pyle, who was recuperating in New Mexico from the emotional effects of surviving an accidental bombing by the Army Air Forces at the start of Operation Cobra in Normandy. Pyle approved of the casting of Meredith and said that he believed Meredith to be the best choice after the death of British actor Leslie Howard in a plane crash. The studio had wanted to place a leading-man type in the main role, but Wellman wanted a physically smaller man such as Meredith to better portray the middle-aged Pyle. As a compromise, Mitchum was chosen to play Bill Walker. The film was one of Mitchum's earliest starring roles.

Nine war correspondents are listed as technical advisors in the film's credits, three of whom appear in the scene in which Pyle learns that he has won the Pulitzer Prize.

Wellman's wife, actress Dorothy Coonan Wellman, appears in an uncredited speaking role as Lt. Elizabeth "Red" Murphy, the combat-zone bride of character "Wingless" Murphy.

The Army agreed to Wellman's request for 150 soldiers, who were training in California for deployment to the Pacific and had all been veterans of the Italian campaign, as extras during the six weeks of filming in late 1944. The War Department allowed the men to grow beards for their roles. Wellman insisted that actual soldiers speak much of the dialogue for authenticity. He also insisted that the film's Hollywood actors live and train with the soldiers.

== Production ==
=== Screenplay ===
The film's concept originated with independent producer Lester Cowan, who approached the War Department in September 1943 for cooperation in making a film about the infantry with the same high degree of prestige as in Air Force. In October, he agreed to terms with United Artists for financial support and distribution of the proposed film. Cowan then developed a story outline based on Pyle's columns reproduced in Here is Your War that the Army approved on November 27.

Attempts to write a script that would accurately translate Pyle's style and sentiments to the screen delayed filming for a year. After the D-Day invasion of Normandy, with the end of the war in sight, the script became more focused on Pyle's movements with the infantry in its final advance to victory.

The screenplay was developed with the input of several war correspondents and associates of Pyle, mainly Don Whitehead, Lee Miller and Paige Cavanaugh, who selected details from Pyle's columns for inclusion in the film, Director William Wellman also worked directly with Pyle.

=== Finding a director ===
Cowan's first choice as director was John Huston, who had completed only two films before entering military service. Cowan was impressed by two combat documentaries that Huston had directed, Report from the Aleutians and The Battle of San Pietro, but was unable to gain Huston's services from the army.

In August 1944, unable to complete the screenplay, Cowan tried to recruit William Wellman to be the film's director. However, Wellman took convincing. So, Cowan asked Ernie Pyle to contact Wellman. Pyle invited Wellman to his home, where he persuaded Wellman to accept the director role.

=== Historical basis ===
Pyle covered the 1st Infantry Division, including the 18th Infantry, in Tunisia from January to May 1943, and wrote a column on the American defeat at Kasserine Pass. He also landed with the 1st Division during the invasion of Sicily in July 1943. However, after the Sicilian campaign, which is mentioned but not portrayed in the film, the 18th Infantry moved to England to prepare for the Allied invasion of France, while the film's Company C is said to have made a landing under fire at Salerno.

While the screenwriters chose the 18th Infantry Regiment for the film, Pyle's favorite outfit was the 133rd Infantry Regiment of the 34th Infantry Division, a unit that he had covered in 1942 while it was still stationed in Northern Ireland and then again in Tunisia.

The events in Italy portrayed in the film are based on Pyle's experiences with soldiers of the 36th Infantry Division in the Battle of San Pietro and the 133rd Infantry in the Battle of Monte Cassino. Mitchum's character of captain Bill Walker was modeled on two soldiers who had impressed Pyle. Walker was based on Captain Henry T. Waskow of the 36th Division's Company B 143rd Infantry. Waskow's death in combat on December 14, 1943, was the subject of Pyle's most famous column. Sgt. "Buck" Eversole was a platoon leader who became the subject of several of Pyle's stories.

== Release ==
Although filmed with Pyle's cooperation, the film premiered two months to the day after he was killed in action on Ie Shima during the invasion of Okinawa. In his February 14, 1945 posting titled "In the Movies", Pyle commented: "They are still calling it The Story of G.I. Joe. I never did like the title, but nobody could think of a better one, and I was too lazy to try."

== Critical appraisal ==
Film critic Manny Farber writes in The New Republic, on August 13, 1945 :

The writing, as well as the direction, constantly shuns the romanticism that has colored almost every other war film. Nobody talks about the war, either as an aim, or as a matter of beating an enemy; in general they seem too tired to talk, and when they do it is in shorthand, avoiding the obvious, which includes every great question like the danger of death and the separation from everybody they love.

Farber adds: “Wellman’s The Story of G. I. Joe is one of the only movies in years that says just about all it has to say, and drives it home with real cinematic strength.”

In The Nation in 1945, film critic James Agee lauds it: "Coming as it does out of a world in which even the best work is nearly always compromised, and into a world which is generally assumed to dread honesty and courage and to despise artistic integrity, it is an act of heroism, and I cannot suggest my regard for it without using such words as veneration and love ... It seems to me a tragic and eternal work of art ... "

In 1987, Leslie Halliwell gives it two out of four stars: "Slow, convincing, sympathetic war film with good script and performances; not by any means the usual action saga." In 2015, Leonard Maltin gives the film three and a half out of four stars: "Meredith is superb as war correspondent Ernie Pyle ... Mitchum's first outstanding film role ... "

== Preservation ==
The Academy Film Archive preserved G.I. Joe in 2000.

== Awards and nominations ==
=== Academy Award nominations ===
- Best Supporting Actor - Robert Mitchum
- Best Original Song - Ann Ronell for "Linda"
- Best Score - Louis Applebaum and Ann Ronell
- Best Screenplay - Leopold Atlas, Guy Endore, and Philip Stevenson

== Sources ==
- Farber, Manny. 2009. Farber on Film: The Complete Film Writings of Manny Farber. Edited by Robert Polito. Library of America. ISBN 978-1-59853-050-6
