= USS Albert T. Harris =

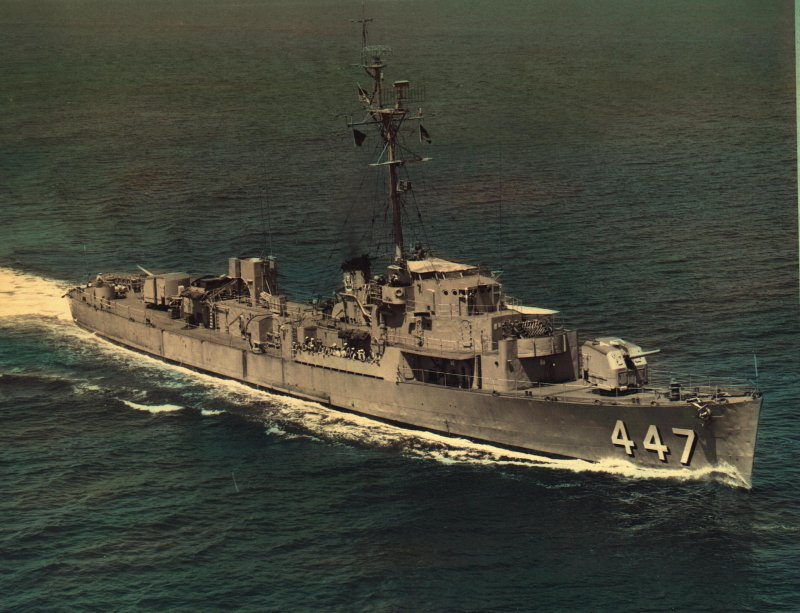
- USS Albert T. Harris (DE-447)

History

United States
- Name: USS Albert T. Harris (DE-447)
- Namesake: Albert T. Harris
- Builder: Federal Shipbuilding and Drydock Company Newark, New Jersey
- Laid down: 13 January 1944
- Launched: 16 April 1944
- Sponsored by: Mrs. J. D. Harris, the mother of Lt. (jg.) Harris
- Commissioned: 29 November 1944
- Recommissioned: 27 April 1951
- Decommissioned: 26 July 1946
- In service: 3rd Naval District, September 1957
- Out of service: 21 September 1968
- Stricken: 23 September 1968
- Fate: Sunk as target off the Virginia Capes, 9 April 1969

General characteristics
- Class & type: John C. Butler-class destroyer escort
- Displacement: 1,350 long tons (1,372 t) light; 1,745 t (1,717 long tons) full
- Length: 306 ft (93 m) (oa)
- Beam: 36 ft 10 in (11.23 m)
- Draught: 13 ft 4 in (4.06 m) (max)
- Propulsion: 2 boilers, 2 geared steam turbines, 12,000 shp, 2 screws
- Speed: 24 knots (44 km/h; 28 mph)
- Range: 6,000 nmi (11,000 km) at 12 kn (22 km/h; 14 mph)
- Complement: 14 officers, 201 enlisted
- Armament: 2-5 in (130 mm), 4 (2×2) 40 mmAA, 10-20 mm AA, 3-21 inch (533 mm) TT, 1 Hedgehog, 8 DCT's, 2 DC tracks

USS Albert T. Harris (DE-447) was a John C. Butler-class destroyer escort acquired by the U.S. Navy during World War II. The primary purpose of the destroyer escort was to escort and protect ships in convoy, in addition to other tasks as assigned, such as patrol or radar picket. Post-war she returned home with two battle stars to her credit.

Albert T. Harris (DE-447) was named in honor of Albert T. Harris who was awarded the Navy Cross for his brave actions in the Guadalcanal campaign.

== Eponym ==
Albert Thomas Harris was born on 29 August 1915 in Madison, Georgia, Harris attended North Georgia College and the University of Georgia before enlisting in the Naval Reserve on 10 September 1940. After a period of training, some of which he spent on the battleship USS New York, he was discharged on 15 June 1941, to accept an appointment as a midshipman in the Naval Reserve the following day. After receiving training at the Naval Reserve Midshipmen's School at Northwestern University, he was commissioned an ensign in the Naval Reserve on 12 September 1941. Following instruction in communications, Harris was assigned to the 12th Naval District temporarily on 15 November 1941. There he awaited transfer to the heavy cruiser USS San Francisco. He reported for duty on board that ship at Pearl Harbor on 6 January 1942.

On the afternoon of 12 November 1942, newly promoted Lieutenant (junior grade) Harris commanded the antiaircraft battery on the aft machine gun platform when 21 Japanese twin-engined torpedo planes (Mitsubishi G4M1 Betties) attacked San Francisco's task group near Lunga Point. He directed the fire of his 20-millimeter guns on an approaching Japanese torpedo plane that had been set ablaze by gunfire from the nearby transport USS McCawley. Maintaining heavy fire until the Betty crashed into them, Harris and three of his gun crews died in the fiery crash. Commander Herbert E. Schonland, who took command of the San Francisco, praised "the remarkable fire discipline and courage" of Harris and his men. "They met their deaths without flinching," Schonland wrote, "and in a manner which has been an inspiration to us all." Harris was posthumously awarded the Navy Cross.

== Construction and commissioning ==
She was laid down on 13 January 1944 at Newark, New Jersey, by the Federal Shipbuilding and Drydock Company.; launched on 16 April 1944; sponsored by Mrs. J. D. Harris, the mother of Lt. (jg.) Harris; and was commissioned on 29 November 1944 at the New York Navy Yard.

== World War II Pacific Theatre operations ==
The destroyer escort spent three weeks at New York outfitting before embarking on her shakedown cruise to the British West Indies late in December. She returned to the United States briefly at the end of January 1945 but soon got underway again, bound for duty in the Pacific. The warship transited the Panama Canal in mid-February and continued, via the Galápagos and Society Islands, to Manus in the Admiralties. There, she became an element of Escort Division (CortDiv 77), and for the next five months, served on convoy escort duty and screened three amphibious operations.

== End-of-war operations ==
Albert T. Harris served as part of a demonstration group making a feint at Morotai during the occupation of the Zamboanga Peninsula of Mindanao between 17 and 23 April and participated in the surface force that covered the landings at Santa Cruz on Davao Gulf on 3 and 4 May. In June, she provided support for the seizure of Brunei Bay, Borneo.

Reassigned to the Philippine Sea Frontier in July, Albert T. Harris spent the remainder of the war escorting ships between islands of the Philippines, protecting them from Japanese submarines. Though she logged several attacks on suspected enemy submersibles, the destroyer escort scored no successes.

== Post-war activity ==
Following Japan's capitulation, the warship joined the South China Force to assist in the occupation of territory still held by Japanese forces, a mission that took her to Shanghai and Hong Kong in China, Haiphong and Hongay in French Indochina, Korea, and the island of Formosa. She returned to the United States at San Diego, California, on 12 February 1946 and was decommissioned there on 26 July 1946.

== Reactivated during Korean War ==
The destroyer escort remained in reserve with the San Diego Group, Pacific Reserve Fleet, for almost five years. The North Korean invasion of South Korea late in June 1950 triggered an expansion in the Navy's active fleet. Accordingly, Albert T. Harris was recommissioned at San Diego, California, on 27 April 1951. While she saw no combat service, her reactivation released other Atlantic Fleet warships for duty off Korea. She served with the U.S. Pacific Fleet along the West Coast until September. At that time, the destroyer escort transited the Panama Canal and joined the Atlantic Fleet as an element of Escort Squadron 12 based at Newport, Rhode Island.

== East Coast training exercises ==
During the ensuing six years, Albert T. Harris operated along the eastern seaboard and in the West Indies. In addition to the normal training evolutions, independent ship's exercises, type training, and the annual Operation Springboard fleet problem - she also provided services to the Fleet Sonar School and made midshipman summer training cruises.

Reassigned to naval reserve training duty in September 1957, under the operational control of the Commandant, 3rd Naval District, the ship spent the remaining 11 years of her Navy career, operating out of New York helping reservists to sharpen their skills as sailors. It served as part of the blockade during the Cuban Missile Crisis of the fall of 1962.

== Final decommissioning and scrapping ==
In August 1968, Albert T. Harris was declared excess to the needs of the Navy. On 19 September 1968, she reported to the Inactive Ship Maintenance Facility at Philadelphia, Pennsylvania, to begin inactivation. Decommissioned at Philadelphia on 21 September 1968, Albert T. Harris was struck from the Naval Vessel Register on 23 September 1968. The former warship was sunk as a target off the Virginia Capes on 9 April 1969.

== Military honors ==
Albert T. Harris earned two battle stars during World War II.
