= William A. Wellman =

American filmmaker (1896–1975)

- Wellman filming The High and the Mighty (1954)
- Born: William Augustus Wellman; February 29, 1896; Brookline, Massachusetts, U.S.
- Died: December 9, 1975 (aged 79); Los Angeles, California, U.S.
- Occupations: Director; producer; writer; actor; pilot
- Years active: 1919–1958
- Spouses: Helene Chadwick (m. 1921; div. 1923) Margery Chapin (m. 1925; div. 1926) Marjorie Crawford (m. 1931; div. 1933) Dorothy Coonan (m. 1934)
- Children: 7, including William Jr.
- Military career
- Allegiance: France; United States
- Branch: Foreign Legion; Lafayette Flying Corps; French Air and Space Force; United States Army; Army Air Service
- Service years: 1917–1918 (FR); 1918–1919 (U.S.)
- Rank: Maréchal des logis
- Unit: Escadrille Spa.87
- Conflicts: World War I; Western Front

William Augustus Wellman (February 29, 1896 – December 9, 1975) was an American film director, producer, screenwriter, actor and military pilot. He was known for his work in crime, adventure, and action genre films, often focusing on aviation themes, a particular passion. He also directed several well-regarded satirical comedies. His 1927 film, Wings, was the first film to win an Academy Award for Best Picture at the 1st Academy Awards ceremony.

Beginning his film career as an actor, he went on to direct over 80 films, at times co-credited as producer and consultant, from the silent era through the Golden Age of Hollywood. He was nominated for four Academy Awards: three Best Director Oscars for the original A Star Is Born (1937), Battleground (1949), and The High and the Mighty (1954) and one in Best Original Story for A Star Is Born, which he won. In 1973, he received the Directors Guild of America's Lifetime Achievement Award.

Prior to filmmaking, Wellman was a decorated combat pilot during World War I, serving in the Lafayette Flying Corps of the French Air Force, and earning a Croix de Guerre with two palms for valorous action.

== Early life ==
Wellman was born in Brookline, Massachusetts. His father, Arthur Gouverneur Wellman, was a Boston Brahmin. William was a great-great-great-great-great-grandson of Puritan Thomas Wellman, who emigrated to the Massachusetts Bay Colony circa 1640. He was also a great-great-great-grandson of Welsh-born Francis Lewis of New York, one of the 56 signatories to the Declaration of Independence. Wellman's mother, Cecilia McCarthy, was an Irish immigrant.

During his teenage years, Wellman often found himself in trouble with authorities. He was expelled from Newton High School in Newtonville, Massachusetts for dropping a stink bomb on the principal's head. He was also arrested and placed on probation for car theft. His mother, who actually worked as a probation officer, was asked to address Congress on the subject of juvenile delinquency. Later, Wellman worked as a salesman, as a general laborer in a lumber yard, and as a player on a minor-league hockey team.

== World War I ==
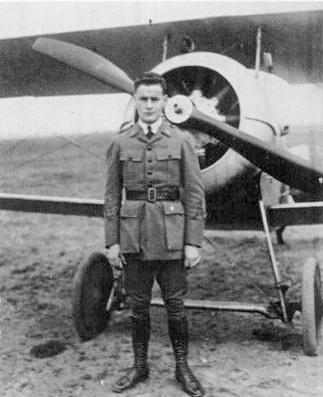
Wellman and Celia, his Nieuport 24 fighter, c. 1917 (one of several aircraft named for his mother)

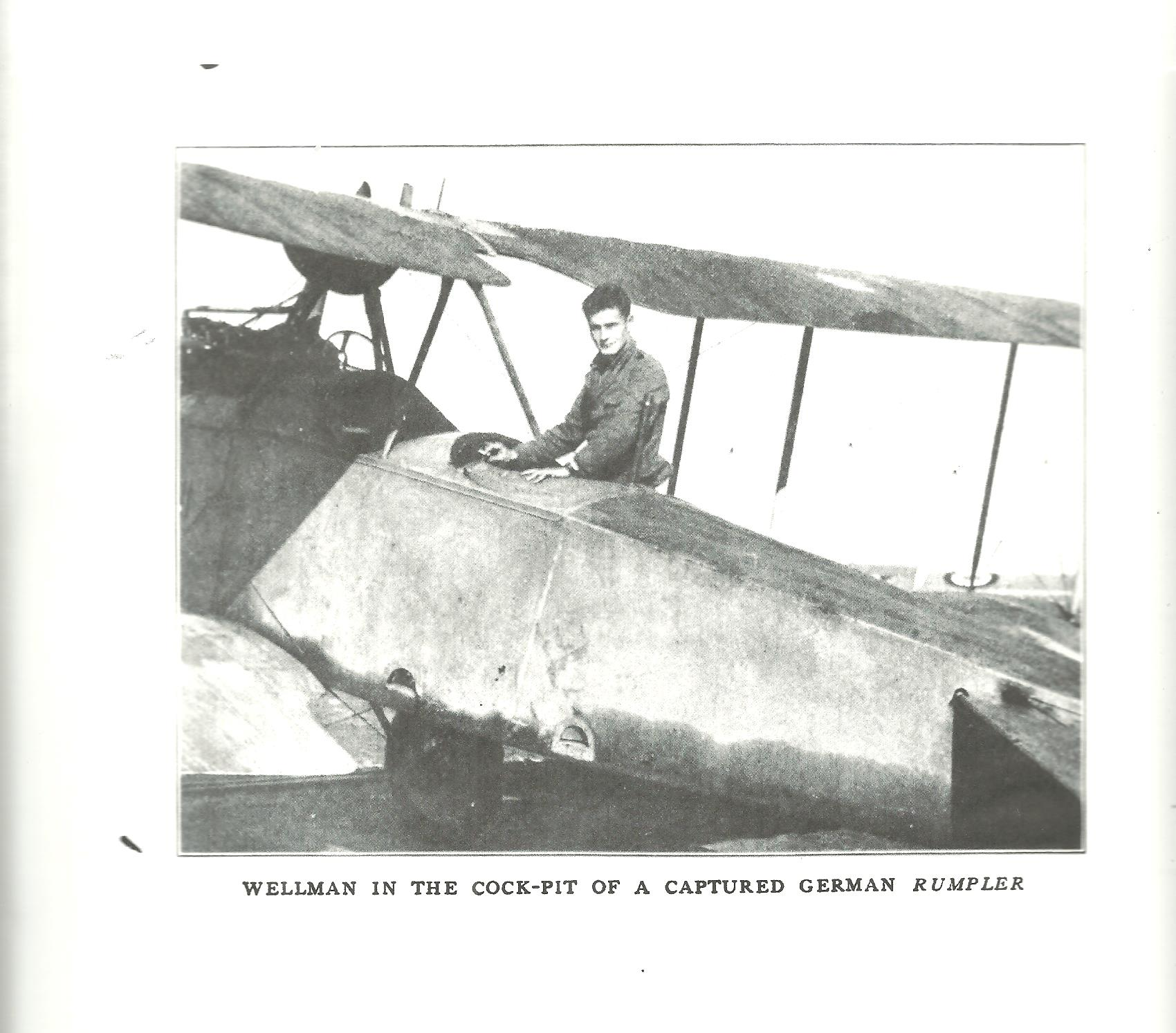
Wellman in a captured German Rumpler (image from his 1918 account Go Get Em!...)

In World War I, Wellman enlisted in the Norton-Harjes Ambulance Corps to serve as a driver in Europe. While in Paris, Wellman joined the French Foreign Legion and was assigned on December 3, 1917, as a fighter pilot, becoming the first American to join Escadrille N.87 in the Lafayette Flying Corps (not the sub-unit Lafayette Escadrille as usually stated), where he earned himself the nickname "Wild Bill", and was awarded the Croix de Guerre with two palms. N.87, les Chats Noir (Black Cat Group) was stationed at Lunéville in the Alsace-Lorraine sector and was equipped with Nieuport 17 and later Nieuport 24 "pursuit" aircraft. Wellman's combat experience culminated in three recorded "kills", along with five probables, although he was ultimately shot down by German anti-aircraft fire on March 21, 1918. Wellman survived the crash but he walked with a pronounced limp for the rest of his life.

Wellman's air-combat credits include the following in 1918: In January 19, a German "Rumpler" shot down in front of American lines in Lorraine by Wellman and Thomas Hitchcock. The next day, a German "Rumpler" shot down near German airfield at Mamy, France; pilot killed/gunner escaped. In March 8, he forced two observers to jump from an observation balloon. (attack unsuccessful; balloon taken down) In March 9, he fired on a German "Rumpler" over Parroy; plane escaped, but rear gunner killed, shot down a German "Rumpler"; killed rear gunner; pilot killed by airman Ruamps, and shot down a German "Albatros"; pilot killed; plane fell into American lines. In March 17, shot down one or two German patrol planes; not confirmed as fight took place over German lines. The next day, he shot down a German "Rumpler;" not confirmed as fight took place over German lines.

Maréchal des logis (Sergeant) Wellman received a medical discharge from the Foreign Legion and returned to the United States a few weeks later. He spoke at War Savings Stamp rallies in his French uniform. In September 1918 his book about French flight school and his eventful four months at the front, Go Get 'Em! (written by Wellman with the help of Eliot Harlow Robinson), was published. He joined the United States Army Air Service, but was too late to fly for America in the war. Stationed at Rockwell Field in San Diego, he taught combat tactics to new pilots.

== Film career ==
While in San Diego, Wellman flew to Hollywood for the weekends in his Spad fighter, using Douglas Fairbanks' polo field in Bel Air as a landing strip. Fairbanks was fascinated with the true-life adventures of "Wild Bill" and promised to recommend him for a job in the movie business; he was responsible for Wellman being cast in the juvenile lead of The Knickerbocker Buckaroo (1919). Wellman was hired for the role of a young officer in Evangeline (1919), but he was fired for slapping Miriam Cooper, the film's star and also the wife of the production's director, Raoul Walsh.

Wellman as a flight instructor at Rockwell Field, 1919

Wellman hated being an actor, thinking it an "unmanly" profession, and was miserable watching himself on screen while learning the craft. He soon switched to working behind the camera, aiming to be a director, and progressed up the line as "a messenger boy, as an assistant cutter, an assistant property man, a property man, an assistant director, second unit director and eventually... director." His first assignment as an assistant director for Bernie Durning provided him with a work ethic that he adopted for future film work. One strict rule that Durning enforced was no fraternization with screen femme fatales, which almost immediately Wellman broke, leading to a confrontation and a thrashing from the director. Despite his transgression, both men became lifelong friends, and Wellman steadily progressed to more difficult first unit assignments.

Wellman made his uncredited directorial debut in 1920 at Fox with Twins of Suffering Creek. The first films he was credited with directing were The Man Who Won and Second Hand Love, released on the same day in 1923. After directing a dozen low-budget 'horse opera' films, Wellman was hired by Paramount in 1927 to direct Wings, a major war drama dealing with fighter pilots during World War I that was highlighted by air combat and flight sequences. The film culminates with the epic Battle of Saint-Mihiel. In the 1st Academy Awards it was one of two films to win Best Picture (the other was Sunrise), although, due to tensions within the studio regarding time and budget overages, Wellman wasn't invited to the event.

Wellman's other films include The Public Enemy (1931), the first version of A Star Is Born (1937), Nothing Sacred (1937), Beau Geste (1939) starring Gary Cooper, Thunder Birds (1942), The Ox-Bow Incident (1943), Lady of Burlesque (1943), The Story of G.I. Joe (1945), This Man's Navy (1945), The Iron Curtain (1948), Battleground (1949) and three films starring and produced by John Wayne: Island in the Sky (1953), The High and the Mighty (1954), and Blood Alley (1955).

While he was primarily a director, Wellman also produced 10 films, one of them uncredited, all of which he also directed. His last film was Lafayette Escadrille (1958), which he produced, directed, wrote the story for and narrated. He wrote the screenplay for two other films that he directed, and one film that he did not direct: 1936's The Last Gangster. Wellman wrote the story for A Star Is Born and (with Robert Carson) received the Academy Award for Best Story. Wellman is credited for the story in the remakes released in 1954, 1976, and 2018. Wellman's work was influenced by his good friend and fellow film director Howard Hawks, with whom he rode motorcycles together in a group called the Moraga Spit and Polish Club.

Wellman reportedly worked fast, usually satisfied with a shot after one or two takes. Despite his reputation for not coddling his leading men and women, he coaxed Oscar-nominated performances from seven actors: Fredric March and Janet Gaynor (A Star Is Born), Brian Donlevy (Beau Geste), Robert Mitchum (The Story of G.I. Joe), James Whitmore (Battleground), and Jan Sterling and Claire Trevor (The High and Mighty). Regarding actors, Wellman in a 1952 interview stated, "Movie stardom isn't about acting ability, it's personality and temperament". He then added, "I once directed Clara Bow. She was mad and crazy but what a personality!"

=== Innovations ===
Wings led to several firsts in filmmaking including newly invented camera mounts that could be secured to plane fuselages and motor-driven cameras to shoot actors while flying as the cameramen ducked out of frame in their cockpits. Star Richard Arlen had some flying experience but co-star Buddy Rogers had to learn to fly for the film, as stunt pilots could not be used during close-up shots. Towers up to 100 feet (30 m) were used to shoot low-flying planes and battle action on the ground.

During the filming of Beggars of Life (1928), a silent film starring Wallace Beery, Richard Arlen and Louise Brooks, sound was added to Beery's introductory scene at the behest of Paramount Studio. Wellman reportedly hung a microphone from a broom so Beery could walk and talk within the scene, avoiding the static shot required for early sound shoots. During the filming of Chinatown Nights (1929), he sat under the camera on a dolly with the mic between his legs, essentially inventing a shotgun mic.

=== Honors ===
In 1973, the Directors Guild of America honored him with a Lifetime Achievement Award. Copies of both Wings and The Story of G.I. Joe are preserved in the Academy Film Archive.

For his contributions to motion pictures, Wellman received a star on the Hollywood Walk of Fame at 6125 Hollywood Boulevard, on February 8, 1960.

== Personal life ==
Wellman revealed near the end of his life that he had married a French woman named Renee during his time in The Lafayette Flying Corps. She was killed in a bombing raid during the war. Later, between 1918 and 1934, he married four additional times in the United States. Wellman married Helene Chadwick on July 2, 1921, separated in July 1923, and were divorced in September 1923. Then he married Margery Chapin (daughter of Frederic Chapin) from 1925 to 1926; together for a short time; adopted Robert Emmett Tansey's daughter, Gloria. Wellman then married Marjorie Crawford from 1930 to 1933 before having a divorced. He finally married Dorothy "Dottie" Coonan on March 20, 1934, which lasted until his death; they had seven children - four daughters, three sons.

Dorothy starred in Wellman's 1933 film Wild Boys of the Road and had seven children with him, including actors Michael Wellman, William Wellman Jr., Maggie Wellman, and Cissy Wellman. His daughter Kathleen "Kitty" Wellman married actor James Franciscus, although they later divorced. His first daughter is Patty Wellman, and he had a third son, Tim Wellman. In 1974, Wellman published his autobiography, A Short Time for Insanity.

=== Death ===
Wellman died of leukemia in 1975 at his Brentwood home in Los Angeles. He was cremated, and his ashes were scattered at sea. His widow Dorothy, at age 95, died on September 16, 2009, in Brentwood, California.

== Career assessments ==
Decades after Wellman's death, William Jr. wrote two biographies about his father, The Man and His Wings: William A. Wellman and the Making of the First Best Picture (2006) and Wild Bill Wellman—Hollywood Rebel (2015). Fellow filmmakers have also examined Wellman's career. Richard Schickel in 1973 devoted an episode of his PBS series The Men Who Made the Movies to Wellman, and in 1996, Todd Robinson made the feature-length documentary Wild Bill: Hollywood Maverick.

== Filmography ==
=== Silent films ===
Year	Title	Functioned as		Notes
Year	Title	Director	Producer	Notes
1923	The Man Who Won	Yes	No	Five reels; lost
1923	Second Hand Love	Yes	No	Five reels; lost
1923	Big Dan	Yes	No	Six reels
1923	Cupid's Fireman	Yes	No	Six reels; lost
1924	Not a Drum Was Heard	Yes	No	Five reels; lost
1924	The Vagabond Trail	Yes	No	Five reels; lost
1924	The Circus Cowboy	Yes	No	Five reels; lost
1925	When Husbands Flirt	Yes	No	Six reels
1926	The Boob	Yes	No	Six reels
1926	You Never Know Women	Yes	No	Six reels
1926	The Cat's Pajamas	Yes	No	Six reels; lost
1927	Wings	Yes	No	
1928	The Legion of the Condemned	Yes	No	Lost
1928	Ladies of the Mob	Yes	Yes	Lost

=== Sound films ===
Year	Title	Functioned as			Notes
Year	Title	Director	Writer	Producer	Notes
1928	Beggars of Life	Yes	No	No	
1929	Chinatown Nights	Yes	No	No	
1929	The Man I Love	Yes	No	No	
1929	Woman Trap	Yes	No	No	
1930	Dangerous Paradise	Yes	No	No	
1930	Young Eagles	Yes	No	No	
1930	Maybe It's Love	Yes	No	No	
1931	Other Men's Women	Yes	No	No	
1931	The Public Enemy	Yes	No	No	
1931	Night Nurse	Yes	No	No	
1931	The Star Witness	Yes	No	No	
1931	Safe in Hell	Yes	No	No	
1932	The Hatchet Man	Yes	No	No	
1932	So Big!	Yes	No	No	
1932	Love Is a Racket	Yes	No	No	
1932	The Purchase Price	Yes	No	No	
1932	The Conquerors	Yes	No	No	
1932	Frisco Jenny	Yes	No	No	
1933	Central Airport	Yes	No	No	
1933	Lilly Turner	Yes	No	No	
1933	Heroes for Sale	Yes	No	No	
1933	Midnight Mary	Yes	No	No	
1933	Wild Boys of the Road	Yes	No	No	
1933	College Coach	Yes	No	No	
1933	Female	Uncredited	No	No	Directed some scenes
1934	Looking for Trouble	Yes	No	No	
1934	Viva Villa!	Uncredited	No	No	Directed some scenes
1934	Stingaree	Yes	No	No	
1934	The President Vanishes	Yes	No	No	
1935	Call of the Wild	Yes	No	No	
1936	Robin Hood of El Dorado	Yes	Yes	No	
1936	Small Town Girl	Yes	No	No	
1936	Tarzan Escapes	Uncredited	No	No	Directed some reshoots
1937	A Star Is Born	Yes	Story	No	
1937	The Last Gangster	No	Story	No	
1937	Nothing Sacred	Yes	Uncredited	No	Script revisions
1938	Men with Wings	Yes	No	Yes	
1939	Beau Geste	Yes	No	Yes	
1939	The Light That Failed	Yes	No	Yes	
1941	Reaching for the Sun	Yes	No	Yes	
1942	The Great Man's Lady	Yes	No	Yes	
1942	Roxie Hart	Yes	No	No	
1942	Thunder Birds	Yes	No	No	
1943	Lady of Burlesque	Yes	No	No	
1943	The Ox-Bow Incident	Yes	No	No	
1944	Buffalo Bill	Yes	No	No	
1945	This Man's Navy	Yes	No	No	
1945	The Story of G.I. Joe	Yes	No	No	
1946	Gallant Journey	Yes	Yes	Yes	
1947	Magic Town	Yes	No	Yes	
1948	The Iron Curtain	Yes	No	No	
1948	Yellow Sky	Yes	No	No	
1949	Battleground	Yes	No	No	
1950	The Next Voice You Hear...	Yes	No	No	
1950	The Happy Years	Yes	No	No	
1951	Three Guys Named Mike	No	Uncredited	No	Script revisions
1951	Across the Wide Missouri	Yes	No	No	
1951	It's a Big Country	Partial	No	No	Segment: "Minister in Washington"
1951	Westward the Women	Yes	No	No	
1952	My Man and I	Yes	No	No	
1953	Island in the Sky	Yes	No	No	Also narrator (uncredited)
1954	The High and the Mighty	Yes	No	No	
1954	Ring of Fear	Uncredited	No	No	Directed additional scenes
1954	Track of the Cat	Yes	No	No	
1955	Blood Alley	Yes	No	No	
1956	Good-bye, My Lady	Yes	No	No	
1958	Darby's Rangers	Yes	No	No	
1958	Lafayette Escadrille	Yes	Story	Yes	

== Awards and nominations ==
Institution	Year	Category	Work	Result
Academy Awards	1938	Best Director	A Star Is Born	Nominated
Academy Awards	1938	Best Story	A Star Is Born	Won
Academy Awards	1950	Best Director	Battleground	Nominated
Academy Awards	1955	Best Director	The High and the Mighty	Nominated
Directors Guild of America	1955	Outstanding Directorial Achievement in Theatrical Feature Film	The High and the Mighty	Nominated
Directors Guild of America	1973	Lifetime Achievement Award	—N/a	Won
Locarno Film Festival	1949	Special Prize (for Direction)	Yellow Sky	Won
National Board of Review	1943	Best Director	The Ox-Bow Incident	Won
New York Film Critics Circle	1943	Best Director	The Ox-Bow Incident	2nd place
New York Film Critics Circle	1945	Best Director	The Story of G.I. Joe	2nd place
Venice Film Festival	1937	Best International Film	A Star Is Born	Nominated
Venice Film Festival	1947	Golden Lion	The Story of G.I. Joe	Nominated
Venice Film Festival	1947	Golden Lion	Gallant Journey	Nominated

== See also ==
- List of ambulance drivers during World War I
