= Kober =

Kober is a German surname. Notable people with the surname include:

- Adolf Kober (1879–1958), German rabbi and medievalist
- Alice Kober (1906–1950), American classical scholar and archaeologist
- Amelie Kober (born 1987), German snowboarder
- Andrew Kober (born 1984), American actor
- Annegret Kober (born 1957), German swimmer
- Arthur Kober (1900–1975), American humorist, author, press agent, and screenwriter
- Axel Kober (born 1970), German conductor
- Birgit Kober (born 1971), German Paralympic athlete
- Carsten Kober (born 1967), German footballer
- Claire Kober (born 1978), English politician
- Farra Kober, American television producer
- Franz Quirin von Kober (1821–1897), German Catholic priest
- Georgia Kober (1873–1942), American pianist and music educator
- Herman Kober (1888–1973), German mathematician
- Ingo Kober (born 1942), president of the European Patent Office
- Jeff Kober (born 1953), American actor
- Lars Kober (born 1976), German canoer
- Leopold Kober (1883–1970), Austrian geologist
- Margot Kober (born 1965), Austrian cross-country skier
- Martin Kober (c. 1550–1598), Polish court painter
- Noémie Kober (born 1979), French rower
- Pascal Kober (born 1971), German politician
- Sebastian Köber (born 1993), German boxer
- Shahar Kober (born 1979), Israeli illustrator
- Theodor Kober (1865–1930), German aviation engineer
