= Skittles =

Skittles may refer to:

- Skittles (confectionery), a brand of fruit-flavor chewy candy, distributed by Wm. Wrigley Jr. Company
- Skittles (sport), the game from which bowling originated
- Skittles (chess), a casual chess game in chess jargon
- Skittles Commercial: The Broadway Musical
- Skittles, a carrom version that uses a spinning top to knock over pins
- Skittles, a slang term for Coricidin in recreational uses
- "Skittles", nickname of Catherine Walters, a famous Victorian courtesan
