= Drew Gasparini =

American songwriter

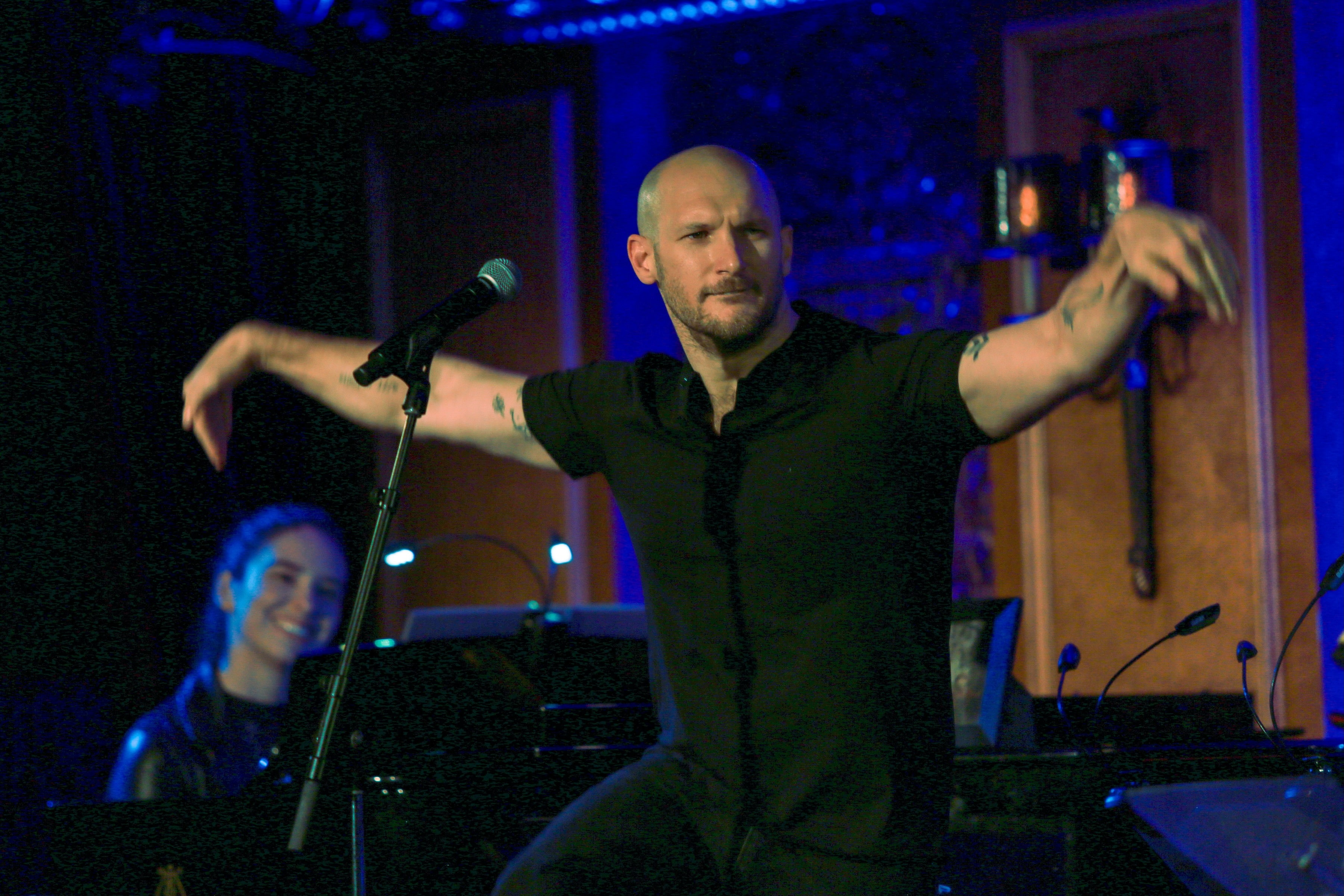
- Drew Gasparini onstage at 54 Below in NYC. Nov. 1, 2021
- Born: April 20, 1986 (age 40); Novato, California
- Occupations: Composer; lyricist; singer

Drew Gasparini (born April 20, 1986) is a songwriter and musical theatre composer/lyricist, best known for his work in musical theatre. Including writing songs for season 2 of Smash, as well as the scores for the musicals The Karate Kid, Skittles Commercial: The Broadway Musical, It's Kind of a Funny Story, and more.

== Biography ==
=== Early life and education ===
Gasparini briefly attended the Musicians Institute in Hollywood, but he dropped out after he "realized [he] didn't need a degree in order to be a songwriter".

=== Career ===
Gasparini is currently writing the scores for a number of new stage musicals including the Broadway-bound adaptation of The Karate Kid alongside screenwriter Robert Mark Kamen, an adaptation of Night Shift for Warner Bros. Theatre Ventures, an adaptation of the Ned Vizzini novel/film It's Kind of a Funny Story for Universal Theatrical Group (book by Alex Brightman), an adaptation of the Newberry Award-winning children's novel The Whipping Boy (also with Brightman), his semi-autobiographical song-cycle, We Aren't Kids Anymore (which is currently in development in the UK), and his newest musical, "The Unthought Known."

Gasparini's other full-length musicals include Crazy, Just Like Me (book, music & lyrics; 2011 NYMF winner: "Best of Fest" and runner-up: "Best Book"), Make Me Bad (a musical, psychological thriller co-created with Alex Brightman), and Turn of the Screw (book by Michael Kimmel; 2012 workshop at Lincoln Center). Gasparini was a contributing composer for the fictional musical Hit List on the NBC television series Smash. In 2019 Gasparini wrote the music for Skittles Commercial: The Broadway Musical, a highly publicized PR stunt starring Michael C. Hall for Super Bowl LIII, and in 2023 Drew co-wrote the song "Somewhere, Anywhere" for the Booking.com ad campaign starring Melissa McCarthy who performed the song. The ad ran globally for over a year with placements during Super Bowl LVII, the NCAA playoffs, as well as the Oscars, the 2023 Tony Awards, and several other high profile televised events.

Gasparini is an alum of the BMI Lehman Engel Musical Theatre Workshop and his unique brand of musical-theatre concerts have been performed to sold-out houses all over the world including Lincoln Center, Kennedy Center, the St. James Theater in London, and NYC venues including Joe's Pub, Feinstein's/54 Below, and Rockwood Music Hall where he once hosted the popular Drew Gasparini & Friends, a monthly residency where Gasparini helped promote and showcase new artists. In 2018 Gasparini was invited to The Ferguson Center for the Arts in Newport News, VA to play a night of his music accompanied by the Virginia Symphony Orchestra.

The popularity of Gasparini's songs among the musical theatre community has made him a top ten best-seller on sites where his sheet music is sold. Gasparini's album I Could Use a Drink was released in 2013 by Broadway Records. The album features performances by Broadway and TV stars including Jeremy Jordan, Mykal Kilgore, Lindsay Mendez, Caissie Levy, Alex Brightman, F. Michael Haynie, Andrew Kober, Justin Guarini, Jennifer Damiano, and many more. On April 10, 2020, the studio cast recording of Gasparini's song-cycle We Aren't Kids Anymore was released by Concord Theatricals. The album features performances by Tony-winner Bonnie Milligan, Tony-nominees Colton Ryan & Lilli Cooper, as well as Raymond J. Lee, and Nicholas Christopher.

Outside of musical theatre Gasparini's songs have been heard on TV shows including the CMT series Gainesville and The Biggest Loser on NBC, as well as ads for Hotels.com, Booking.com, Toyota, and more. Drew was once one third of the indie-folk band Saint Adeline longside his two sisters, Chloe and Kasie and continues to perform as a solo artist as well.

On January 13, 2021, Gasparini launched his podcast "Now We're Talking with Drew Gasparini" on the Broadway Podcast Network with guests Alex Brightman, Kathryn Gallagher, and Colton Ryan. which ran for two seasons.

== Musicals ==
Crazy, Just Like Me

Gasparini wrote the book, music, and lyrics for Crazy, Just Like Me, with additional book by Louis Sacco. The musical premiered in 2007 in Gasparini's hometown at the Novato Theatre Company's Pacheco Playhouse. Crazy, Just Like Me was produced as part of the 2009 San Francisco Theatre Festival and the 2011 New York Musical Theatre Festival, where it won Best of Fest and was runner-up for Best Book.

Make Me Bad

Make Me Bad, with music and lyrics by Gasparini and book by Alex Brightman, premiered at the Bloomington Playwrights Project in 2011.

It's Kind of a Funny Story

It's Kind of a Funny Story, commissioned by Universal Theatrical Group, features music and lyrics by Gasparini and a book by Alex Brightman. The musical is based on Ned Vizzini's novel and the film of the same name. It debuted at Feinstein's/54 Below in March 2017.

Night Shift

Gasparini wrote the music and lyrics for Night Shift, with book by screenwriters Babaloo Mandel and Lowell Ganz. Warner Bros. Theatre Ventures commissioned the musical based on the 1982 movie of the same name.

Skittles Commercial: The Broadway Musical

Skittles Commercial: The Broadway Musical, with music by Drew Gasparini, lyrics by Nathaniel Lawlor, and book by Will Eno, was performed on the day of the 2019 Super Bowl. The show was produced by produced by Mars, DDB, and Smuggler, directed by Sarah Benson, and starred Michael C. Hall. Forbes Magazine declared it the funniest Super Bowl ad of 2019.

The Karate Kid

Gasparini wrote the music and lyrics and screenwriter Robert Mark Kamen wrote the book for the Broadway-bound musical adaption of The Karate Kid. The production is being produced by Gorgeous Entertainment, directed by Amon Miyamoto, and choreographed by Keone and Mari Madrid.

We Aren't Kids Anymore

Gasparini wrote the book, music, and lyrics for We Aren't Kids Anymore, a song cycle that premiered at Christopher Newport University in 2019. The show also features a poem by Keith White. Concord Theatricals released a cast album of the show in April 2020 featuring Lilli Cooper, Bonnie Milligan, Nicholas Christopher, Colton Ryan, and Raymond J. Lee. Licensing rights for the show are available from Concord Theatricals.

The Whipping Boy

The Whipping Boy is a musical adaptation of the children's novel by Sid Fleischman with music and lyrics by Gasparini and book and lyrics by Alex Brightman.

Untitled Victoria Woodhull project

Gasparini is currently collaborating with Carson Kreitzer on a musical about the life of suffragette Victoria Woodhull.

== Other works ==
Gasparini is also part of comedy group The (M)orons along with three other Broadway actors: Alex Brightman, Andrew Kober, and F. Michael Haynie. He and Brightman developed The Life and Slimes of Marc Summers together in 2016.

== Discography ==
- 2008: Overboard
- 2012: Drew Gasparini Band
- 2013: I Could Use a Drink
- 2016: Saint Adeline EP (with his sibling band Saint Adeline)
- 2020: We Aren't Kids Anymore
