= Swee Touch Nee =

Oldest Jewish-owned tea company in America

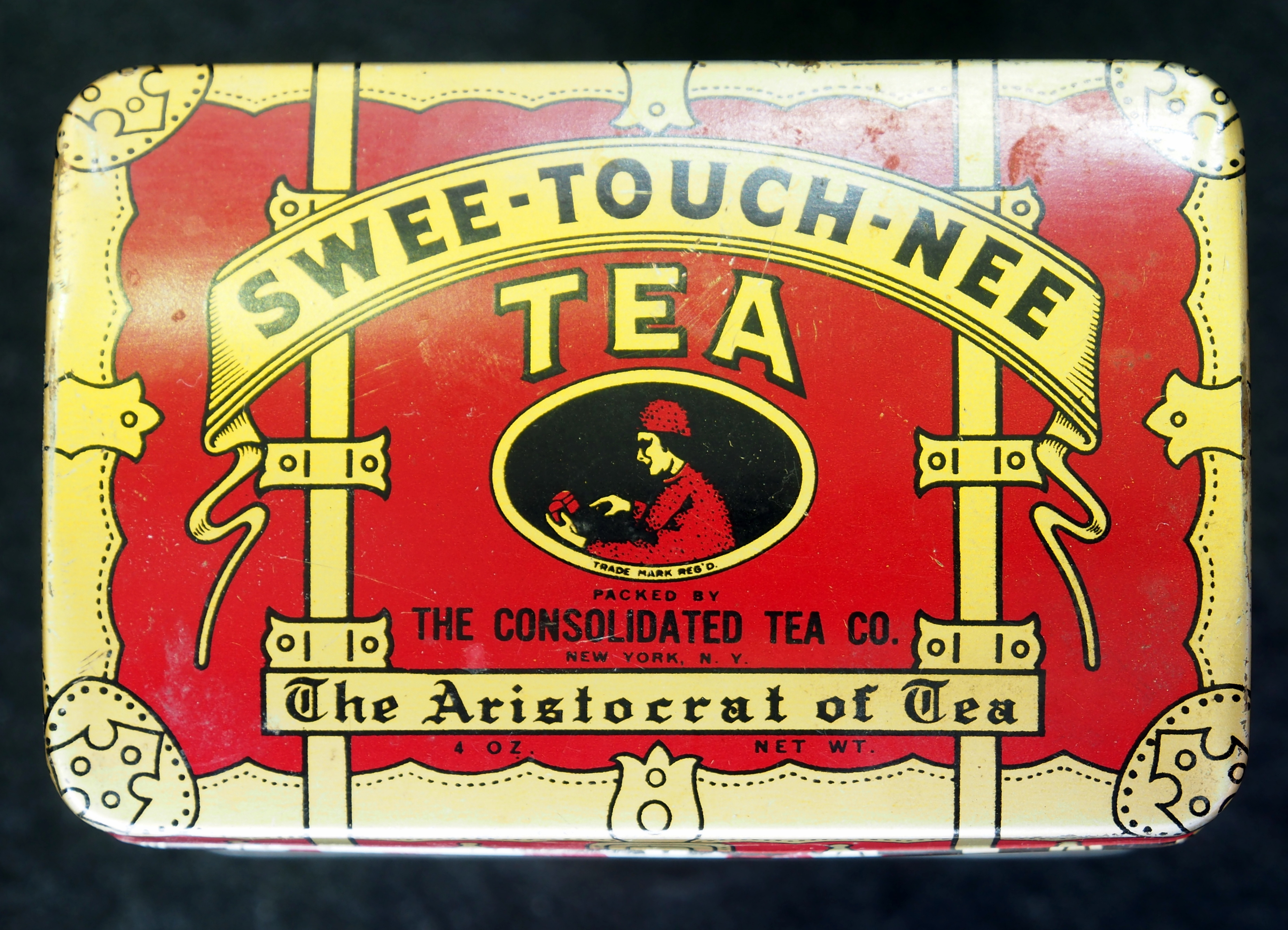
A Swee-Touch-Nee Tea tin from the mid 20th century

Swee-Touch-Nee Tea is a brand of orange pekoe black tea founded in approximately 1880 by the now-dissolved Consolidated Tea Company Inc, one of the oldest Jewish companies in America.

Swee-Touch-Nee Tea derives its name from the loose Russian transliteration of "tsvetochnyy chay", which translates to "flowery tea." On older tins, the name was written in Cyrillic (Цвѣточный Чай) with the transliteration/translation "Zvetouchny Tea."

== History ==
Swee-Touch-Nee Tea was established in approximately 1880 by Samuel Zechnowitz (1865-1942) a Jewish merchant from Minsk, and a founding member of The Forward. Fleeing antisemitism in the Russian Empire, Zechnowitz immigrated to New York in the 1880s and opened a tea shop on the Lower East Side. The company, then in its infancy in the form of several selected tea blends, arrived with him.

The Consolidated Tea Company was formed in 1911 to take over the Columbia Tea Co. Consolidated imported and packaged tea, which included the Swee-Touch-Nee blend. An advertisement in the Jewish Daily Forward dated February 25, 1931 describes the Consolidated Tea Company as "the oldest Jewish company in America."

Upon his death in 1942, Samuel Zechnowitz’s nephew Jacob Zechnowitz (1886-1965) became president of the company. In 1966, The Consolidated Tea Company moved from its original headquarters in Brooklyn to Lynbrook, NY, where it continued to be a family-owned and operated business for a further 50 years. In 2015, The Consolidated Tea Company was dissolved and the Swee-Touch-Nee Tea brand was purchased by Eastern Tea.

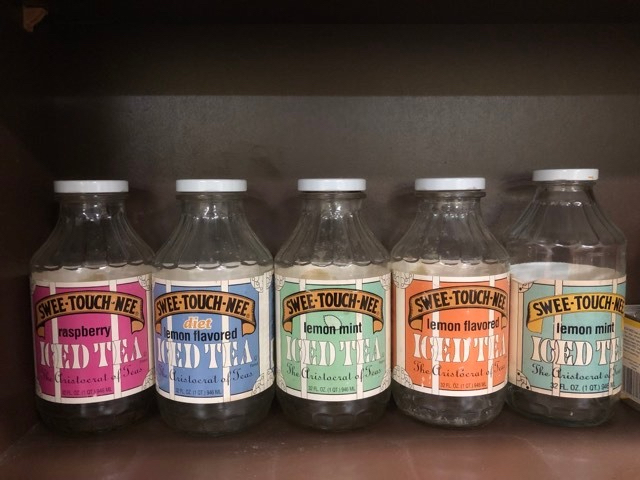
Swee-Touch-Nee Tea flavored iced tea products that were produced in the 1960s–1970s and later discontinued

The Consolidated Tea Company previously produced a variety of discontinued Swee-Touch-Nee Tea products including: Green tea, flavored iced teas, powdered iced tea mix, hot cocoa, and an assortment of flavored tea bags.

== Significance in Jewish-American culture ==
=== Kosher tea ===
Swee-Touch-Nee Tea is a certified kosher product and is also available kosher for Passover.

=== The red and gold tins ===
Swee-Touch-Nee Tea was originally packaged in red and gold steamer trunk-style tins that would soon become a familiar item in many Jewish American households, particularly in New York City and the surrounding areas. The company switched to red and gold cardboard packaging in the late 1960s. Original Swee-Touch-Nee Tea tins are held in collections at the Jewish Museum (Manhattan), the National Museum of American History, and the Jewish Museum of Maryland.

Vintage Swee-Touch-Nee Tea tins are considered collector's items and can occasionally be found in antique stores and online marketplaces throughout the world. Swee-Touch-Nee Tea tins dated from the late 1880s until approximately 1913 are labelled in the original Russian script. Tins from approximately 1913 until 1917 are labelled in both English and Russian. Following the 1917 Russian Revolution, Swee-Touch-Nee Tea tins were produced with only English text, a result of the negative public sentiment surrounding the antisemitic trope of Jewish Bolshevism.

=== In popular culture ===
A Swee-Touch-Nee Tea box is shown in Season 1, Episode 8 of the TV series Archive 81.

Swee-Touch-Nee Tea is mentioned in the book It's Kind of a Funny Story by Ned Vizzini.

In 1975 (and again as part of a 1980 rerun series) a Wacky Packages trading card was produced by Topps which parodied Swee-Touch-Nee Tea as "Don't-Touch-Mee Tea"

== See also ==
- Jewish American cuisine
- History of the Jews in New York City
