= House of Secrets (novel) =

2013 children's novel by Chris Columbus and Ned Vizzini

- First edition hardcover
- Author: Chris Columbus; Ned Vizzini
- Cover artist: Cliff Nielsen
- Language: English
- Series: House of Secrets
- Genre: adventure, action, fantasy
- Publisher: Balzer + Bray
- Publication date: April 23, 2013
- Publication place: United States
- Media type: Print, e-book, audiobook
- Pages: 490 pages
- ISBN: 9780062192462
- Followed by: House of Secrets: Battle of the Beasts, House of Secrets: Clash of Worlds

House of Secrets is a 2013 children's novel by Chris Columbus and Ned Vizzini. The book was first published on April 23, 2013, through Balzer + Bray and is the first book in the House of Secrets series. The book follows the three Walker family children as they attempt to find a secret book and rescue their parents in the process. Rights to the book were sold in 12 foreign territories.

Of the book, Columbus has commented that he was inspired to write the series after seeing the popularity of the Harry Potter series and its effect on young readers. Columbus has also remarked that he views the book as a "cousin" to his 1985 film The Goonies.

== Synopsis ==
Cordelia, Brendan, and Eleanor Walker are less than pleased when their parents purchase the old and creepy, suspiciously inexpensive yet too-perfect Kristoff House; even less when, after just a few days of living in the house, a mysterious woman called Dahlia Kristoff appears and demolishes it. She claims to be the "Wind Witch" and the daughter of the original owner of the house, Denver Kristoff. The three Walker children are horrified when they find that suddenly, they weren't in San Francisco anymore, and their parents were nowhere to be found. Cordelia is mystified when they meet Will Draper, a member of the Royal Flying Corps from World War I, who seems quite familiar. This is when the Walker kids realize that they're trapped in a novel written by Kristoff himself, a novel from which their new friend Will came. They soon find strange things and learn that they are not just trapped in a single book, but inside three of them. The Wind Witch appears before them once again, demanding that they find The Book of Doom and Desire, a secret book that she can't touch, should the kids ever want to see their parents again. The problem is, the three kids are trapped in this vast universe of intertwined stories and they have no clues as to where the book is. They go on crazy adventures and jump over extreme hurdles like deaths and danger, meeting all sorts of friends as well as foes, all to find this Book of Doom and Desire.

== Characters ==
- Jake Walker: used to be a working professional doctor in San Francisco before "the incident".
- Bellamy Walker: Wife of Dr. Jacob Walker.
- Cordelia: oldest Daughter of Mr. and Mrs. Walker. (15 years old) who falls for Will Draper
- Brendan: Son of Mr. and Mrs. Walker. (12 years old)
- Eleanor: Youngest Daughter of Mr. and Mrs. Walker. (8 years old)
- Denver Kristoff: Used to own the Kristoff House, the Storm King, and writer of The Heart And The Helm, Savage Warriors, and The Fighting Ace
- Dahlia Kristoff: Daughter of Mr. Kristoff, the Wind Witch and Queen Daphne
- Will Draper: A National Flying Corp airman in World War One who helps the Walker children.
- Slayne: A courtier in the court of Queen Daphne. Also Captain Sangray's brother.
- Fat Jagger: A Colossus in one of Kristoff's books.
- Captain Sangray: The cruel Captain of the Moray, a pirate ship. Also Slayne's brother
- Tranquebar: First mate on the Moray.
- Penelope Hope: The maid in Kristoff's house. She was brought back to life by Brendan in the Kristoff house attic and was killed by Denver Kristoff because she found The Book Of Doom And Desire
- Celene: Resistance fighter who Brendan has a crush on

== Development ==
Columbus originally began working on the House of Secrets in 1999 as a screenplay entitled Stones of Time, but chose to adapt it into a novel after realizing that the film would be too expensive to produce at that time and also because of his obligations for the Harry Potter film series. Due to his inexperience with writing novels, Columbus brought in Vizzini to assist in the writing of the novel. Columbus and Vizzini wrote the book by the two e-mailing the first few chapters back and forth until they had "about 100 pages". They sent the completed portion of the book to publishers and were picked up within about 1–2 days. After completing the manuscript, Columbus and Vizzini solicited the advice of J.K. Rowling, who recommended that they add more character development to the novel as it "[moved] too fast".

The two authors based the character of Denver Kristoff on writers such as Ray Bradbury and H.P. Lovecraft, and designed the book's chapters to end on cliffhangers akin to "the work of someone like Michael Crichton or even Charles Dickens".

== Adaptations ==
=== Cancelled film ===
The film rights to the House of Secrets trilogy have been picked up by Rise Entertainment. Columbus's 1492 Pictures was going to adapt the series from Columbus' initial screenplay with principal photography slated to begin in January 2014.

=== Television ===
In September 2021, it was announced that Disney Branded Television is developing a television series adaptation of the novel for Disney+ from Columbus and his 26th Street Pictures partners, Michael Barnathan and Mark Radcliffe.

== Reception ==
Critical reception has been mostly positive. Publishers Weekly and Common Sense Media both gave favorable reviews for House of Secrets, with Publishers Weekly commenting that while the "kitchen sink aspect of the plot gives the story a somewhat crowded, frenetic feel", the "deft characterizations and wildly imaginative concept more than make up for it". Kirkus Reviews gave a mixed review, remarking that the book had "plenty of punch" but that it "may still have trouble measuring up to the competition".
