= William Hall Sherwood =

American musician

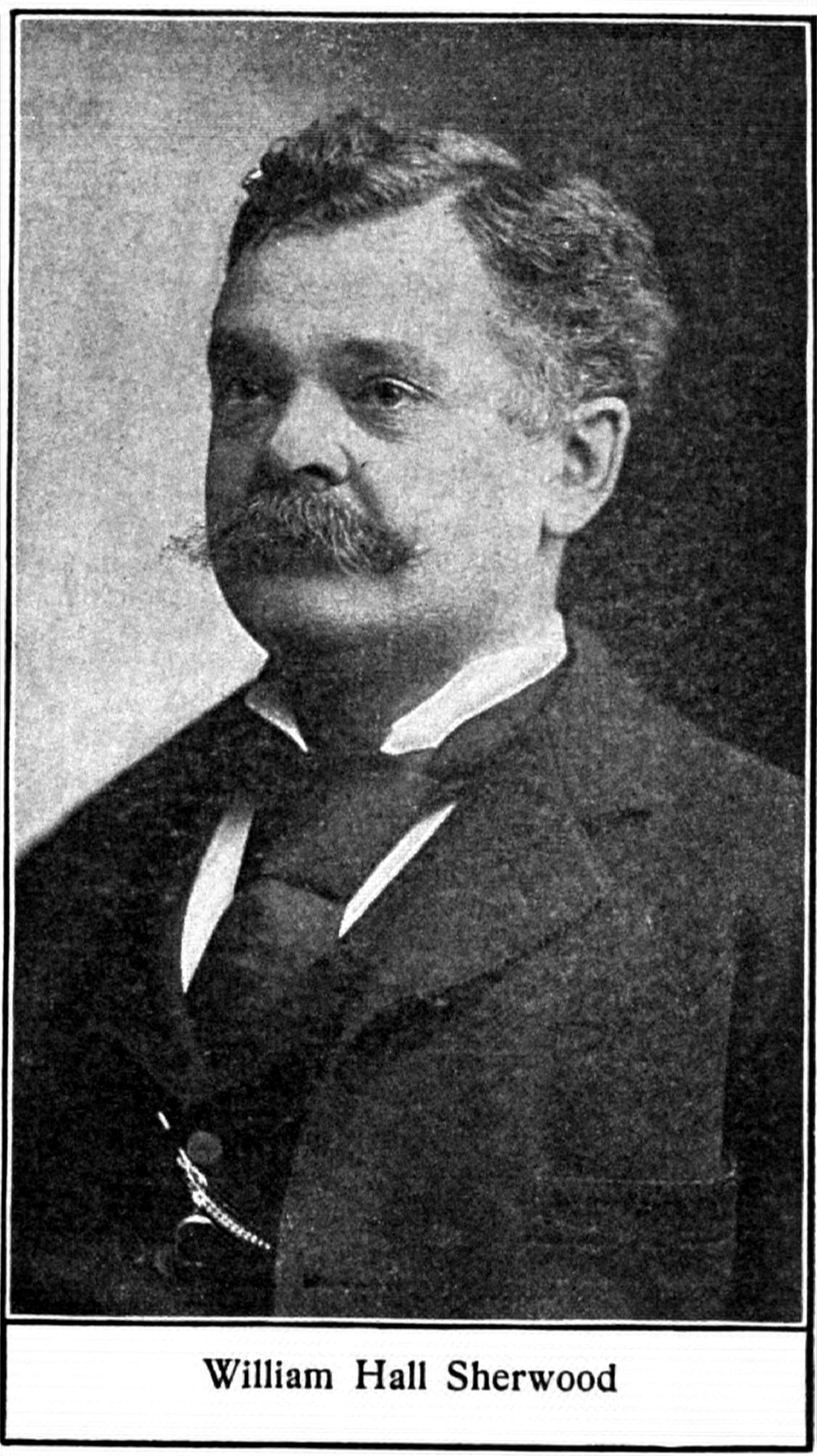
- from The Etude
- Born: January 31, 1854; Lyons, New York
- Died: January 7, 1911 (aged 56); Chicago, Illinois
- Occupation: Pianist & Educator
- Years active: 1872–1910
- Known for: Founder of Sherwood Music School
- Spouses: Mary Neilson Fay (m. 1874–1884) Estelle F. Abrams (m. 1887–1911)
- Children: Mrs. Ethellinda Anderson; Ruth Sherwood
- Parents: Rev. Lyman H. Sherwood; Mary Bales Sherwood

William Hall Sherwood (January 31, 1854 – January 7, 1911) was a late 19th and early 20th century American pianist and music educator who, after having studied in Europe with notable musicians, became one of the first renowned piano performers in the United States. He founded the Sherwood Music School, which was acquired by Columbia College Chicago in 2007.

== Family history and early life ==
Sherwood was born on January 31, 1854, in Lyons, New York to Reverend Lyman H. Sherwood and Mary Balis Sherwood. Sherwood's paternal grandfather was a judge and a Senator and his grandmother, who was also a skilled musician, had ancestry traces back to the English nobility. Mary Balis Sherwood was a well-educated woman, born near Catskill, New York where she grew up in a home that had been given to her great-grandfather for service in the Revolutionary War. Lyman H. Sherwood was an Episcopal minister, a college professor, and a talented musician.

In 1854, the year of William Hall Sherwood's birth, his father left the ministry to pursue his interests in music further by opening the second incorporated music school in the United States, the Lyons Musical Academy in Lyons, New York. At age nine, Sherwood began attending this school and learning piano. Due to his rapid progression, Sherwood began teaching younger students at the Lyons Musical Academy in 1866.

== Music instruction abroad ==
During the summer of 1871, Sherwood took five weeks of piano lessons with the American composer and pianist, William Mason. Recognizing Sherwood's talent, Mason encouraged him to study piano in Europe. Sherwood first traveled to Berlin, Germany with his father, where he began piano studies with Theodor Kullak. Kullak criticized the limitations of Sherwood's small hands and expressed concern that he would not do great legato octave work. Recognizing this challenge, Sherwood drafted his own manipulations of the joints within his thumbs, practiced slowing and accurately, and over time was able to successfully demonstrate his octave exercises to Kullak.

During the winter of 1871, Sherwood moved to Stuttgart due to health problems, where he simultaneously studied composition with Carl Doppler and worked as the organist at the English Church at Stuttgart. After about six months, he returned to Berlin to study more with Kullak, and he began music theory and composition studies with Carl Friedrich Weitzmann, piano lessons with Ludwig Deppe, and counterpoint and composition lessons with Ernst Friedrich Richter. During this time, Sherwood began composing some piano pieces and was encouraged to begin performing them in Weimar and Hamburg.

Sherwood's most successful and popular concert recognition comes after the 1872–1873 winter season, when he performed Ludwig van Beethoven’s “Emperor” Concerto, No. 5 in E-flat major with the Berlin Orchestra. This concert was so successful that it was repeated under the direction of Richard Wüerst before thousands of audience members.

During this time, Sherwood was introduced to one of Kullak's other students, Mary Neilson Fay (born 1855), originally from Williamsburg, New York. Fay was an accomplished pianist in her own right, having excelled under a number of piano teachers in America and Germany and moving on to public performances. In 1874, Sherwood and Fay married; they had three children together. Sherwood and Fay spent about six months in Weimar, Germany where they had the privilege of hearing and studying under the guidance of Franz Liszt, who offered to act as their eldest daughter's godfather.

== Return to United States ==
Sherwood and Fay returned to the United States in May 1876, where Sherwood began working as a faculty member at the New England Conservatory of Music. He began his American concert debut as the soloist with the Theodore Thomas Orchestra at the Centennial Exposition in Philadelphia, Pennsylvania. Throughout the next couple of years, Sherwood and Fay toured together, performing in a variety of American cities. However, their marriage ended in divorce, and Fay even sued Sherwood for child support in April 1886 after he had neglected to pay on an order from November 1885. In 1887, Sherwood married one of his former students, Estelle F. Abrams of Monongahela, Pennsylvania; they had two children together.

== Music educator ==
During the summer of 1889, Sherwood began holding workshops and lessons for piano teachers at the Chautauqua Institution’s summer Music School Festival. Sherwood continued to travel back to Chautauqua every summer to provide instruction at the camp, until the summer of 1910 before his death.

In Fall 1889, Sherwood and his wife moved to Chicago, Illinois as he became the Director of the Pianoforte Department in the newly established School for Music and Dramatic Art within the Conservatory of Music. In 1895, Sherwood left his position at the Conservatory of Music to establish his own school, the Sherwood Music School, at the Fine Arts Building in Chicago, Illinois. Allie Luse Dick was a student.

While managing his own school, Sherwood also acted as a piano faculty member for the Siegel-Myers Correspondence School of Music. In 1906, Sherwood began writing lesson plans, exercises, studies, and compositions for piano for distance students learning piano methods by mail order. Siegel-Myers advertised this as an opportunity for their students to learn from “American’s Foremost Pianist.” These correspondence courses in piano by Sherwood served as the foundation for the Sherwood Music School when the administration chose to add an Extension Division after Sherwood's death.

== Death ==
Sherwood remained the president of his school and the director of the piano department at Siegel-Myers until he suffered a stroke and became bedridden from paralysis in late 1910. On January 7, 1911, Sherwood died at his home. His student and assistant Georgia Kober succeeded him as president of the Sherwood Music School, leading the school for over thirty years until 1942.
