= The (M)orons =

The (M)orons is an American comedy and musical group consisting of Broadway performers and writers Drew Gasparini (Gaspo), F. Michael Haynie (F.), Andrew Kober (Andrew Rebecca Kober), and Tony Award nominee Alex Brightman (Brighty). The group has performed in various venues throughout New York City, including 54 Below and The Slipper Room. Most of their songs are written by Gasparini, and the group often collaborates with other stage performers in New York.

In addition to their live shows, The (M)orons released a series of podcasts in 2014, titled Who Gives a Sh!t? featuring various guests also involved in the theatre business.

Their show at The Slipper Room, titled The (M)oron's Happy Hour was named a "must see" in New York.
