= Anna Boden and Ryan Fleck =

American filmmaking duo

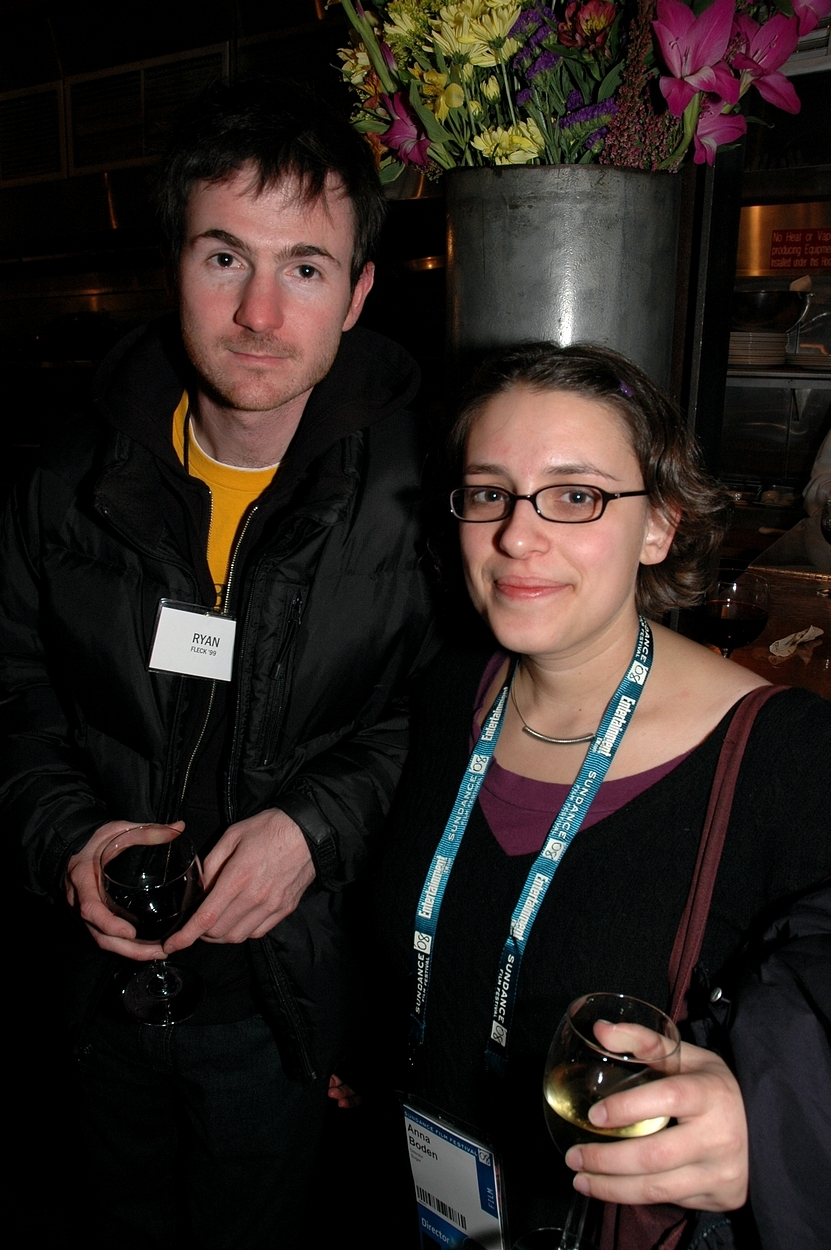
- Fleck (left) and Boden in 2008
- Born: Anna Boden; October 20, 1979 (age 47); Newton, Massachusetts, U.S.
- Education: Columbia University
- Occupation: Filmmaker
- Years active: 2000–present
- Children: 1
- Born: Ryan K. Fleck; September 20, 1976 (age 50); Berkeley, California, U.S.
- Education: New York University Tisch School of the Arts
- Occupation: Filmmaker
- Years active: 2000–present

Anna Boden and Ryan K. Fleck are an American filmmaking duo. The duo rose to prominence for their work on the 2004 short film Gowanus, Brooklyn, which earned the Grand Jury prize at the Sundance Film Festival. They went on to collaborate on the Academy Award-nominated film Half Nelson. Their film Sugar (2008) was honored as one of the Top 10 for 2009 at the American Film Institute Awards; and one of the Top Independent Films at the National Board of Review Awards 2009. They are best known for writing and directing Captain Marvel, which grossed over $1 billion and is one of the highest-grossing films of all time, making Boden the first woman to direct a live-action movie that has grossed $1 billion.

The duo received a Primetime Emmy Award nomination as executive producers on the limited television series Mrs. America (2020). They are also known for their films It's Kind of a Funny Story (2010), Mississippi Grind (2015), and Freaky Tales (2024).

== Early life ==
Boden was born and raised in Newton, Massachusetts, where she grew up with a love of movies, English literature, and photography. As a freshman in high school, learned of filmmaking as a medium when joined an upperclassman 'Intro to Film' class and wrote a report on filmmaker Robert Altman. Boden studied cinema and English at Columbia University in New York City, but took a year off after her junior year to participate in an AmeriCorps program in Seattle, where she helped develop a filmmaking course for students in the Talent Search program.

Fleck was born in Berkeley, California, growing up there and in Oakland. His stepfather played a background poker player in the John Wayne film The Flying Leathernecks. Fleck attended Castro Valley High School and Diablo Valley College, focusing on theater, acting, writing and directing, before moving to New York to study film at NYU's Tisch School of the Arts.

After returning for her senior year at Columbia University, Boden took a summer filmmaking course at NYU where she met Fleck, who was working in the film editing department at NYU shortly after graduating there. The two bonded over the works of Robert Altman and, after Fleck had finished his thesis short film Struggle, they decided to collaborate on several student films and began dating.

== Career ==
Together they made the short documentaries Have You Seen This Man? and Young Rebels before they wrote and directed the short film Gowanus, Brooklyn, a sample feature aiming to attract potential financiers to their undeveloped script, Half Nelson. The short won a prize at the 2004 Sundance Film Festival and Boden and Fleck were subsequently invited to the Sundance Writer's Lab to receive professional feedback on the Half Nelson film screenplay.

The film did not receive adequate financing for years, with Boden and Fleck often returning to script revisions between other projects such as safe-sex shorts for the CDC. Fleck later stated: "We were trying to get it off the ground so we had plenty of time to keep writing and rewriting. I think the time was valuable because I think we made it as good as we could." He also had several disagreements with Boden while writing, though he claims their "back and forth" system of rewriting each other's work has always worked well. Though Fleck was the only of the pair to receive directing credit for the film, he has gone on record and said that the work was an equal divide. The New York Sun described the pair "partners in work and life", stating "They work as a genuine team, from script to finished product. Mr. Fleck directed the film. Ms. Boden produced and edited. Their official titles, however, conceal the fluid way they go about making films."

In spite of the effort in making the script "as good as we could" prior to filming, Fleck encouraged Half Nelson's actors to ad lib and improvise, although he and lead actor Ryan Gosling compromised many scenes in the rehearsal process as Fleck thought that Gosling's ideas were too different from the script in some cases. Half Nelson was well received by critics; with Ryan Gosling's performance earning him a Best Actor in a Leading Role win from the Independent Spirit Awards and nominations from the Critics' Choice Movie Awards, Satellite Awards, Screen Actors Guild Awards, and Academy Awards.

Boden and Fleck have since co-written and co-directed the 2008 film Sugar, which premiered at the 2008 Sundance Film Festival, about a 19-year-old Dominican man who immigrates to the United States to play minor league baseball. The two wrote the screenplay after researching about many Dominican immigrants who arrive in America to play in minor league towns, saying: "The stories we heard were so fascinating that it became what we were writing before we'd even decided it was our next project". They also collaborated on a screen adaptation of Ned Vizzini's young adult novel It's Kind of a Funny Story, which was released on October 8, 2010.

In 2012, the duo began work on a gambling movie called Mississippi Grind. The idea for the film came when they visited riverboat casinos in Iowa. By this point in their career, Boden and Fleck had fully committed to each other; "In the early days of our partnership we had to navigate a lot of issues concerning trust and ego. Nowadays, those issues are almost entirely gone. Having a creative partner who you can wholly trust is a wonderful asset."

In April 2017, Boden and Fleck were hired to direct the Marvel Studios film Captain Marvel. They were previously considered to direct another Marvel film, Guardians of the Galaxy. Producer Kevin Feige said of them, "We met with lots and lots of people . . . and Anna and Ryan just had an amazing way of talking about Carol Danvers and talking about her journey. We want filmmakers that can help us focus on and elevate the character journey so it doesn't get lost amongst the spectacle." The film was released in March 2019, and became a box office success, grossing more than $1 billion worldwide. In May 2019, it was revealed they would direct the first two episodes and produce the television show Mrs. America starring Cate Blanchett as Phyllis Schlafly. As of January 2020 Boden and Fleck were in talks to direct a Marvel Disney+ series.

== Personal life ==
Boden and Fleck formerly dated, however, contrary to popular belief they are not a married couple. Boden was pregnant at the time of Mississippi Grind's release. Boden is Jewish.

== Filmography ==
=== Film ===
Year	Title	Directors	Writers	Producers	Editors	Ref.
2006	Half Nelson	Ryan Fleck	Yes	Anna Boden	Anna Boden	
2008	Sugar	Yes	Yes	Executive	Anna Boden	
2009	Children of Invention	No	No	No	Anna Boden	
2010	It's Kind of a Funny Story	Yes	Yes	No	Anna Boden	
2015	Mississippi Grind	Yes	Yes	No	Anna Boden	
2019	Captain Marvel	Yes	Yes	No	No	
2024	Freaky Tales	Yes	Yes	Yes	No	

=== Television ===
Year	Title	Directors	Writers	Executive producers	Notes
2009	In Treatment	Ryan Fleck	No	No	7 episodes
2011	The Big C	Yes	No	No	2 episodes
2014	30 for 30	Ryan Fleck	No	Anna Boden	Episode: "The Day the Series Stopped"
2014–2015	Looking	Ryan Fleck	No	No	3 episodes
2014–2015	The Affair	Yes	No	No	4 episodes
2016–2017	Billions	Yes	No	No	3 episodes
2017	Room 104	Yes	Yes	No	Episode: "Red Tent"
2020	Mrs. America	Yes	No	Yes	4 episodes
2024	Masters of the Air	Yes	No	No	2 episodes
2027	Criminal	Yes	No	Yes	4 episodes
