= It's Kind of a Funny Story =

2006 novel by Ned Vizzini

- First edition cover
- Author: Ned Vizzini
- Language: English
- Genres: Young adult fiction, Comedy
- Published: 2006 (Hyperion)
- Publication place: United States
- Media type: Print (Hardback & Paperback)
- Pages: Paperback: 444 pp. Hardcover: 502 pp.
- ISBN: 9780786851966
- OCLC: 61458359

It's Kind of a Funny Story is a 2006 novel by American author Ned Vizzini. The book was inspired by Vizzini's own brief hospitalization for depression in November 2004. The book received recognition as a 2007 Best Book for Young Adults from the American Library Association.

A film adaptation, directed by Anna Boden and Ryan Fleck, was released in the United States on October 8, 2010.

== Plot ==
Craig Gilner, the narrator, is 15 years old and lives with his family in a middle-class Brooklyn neighborhood. He attends the prestigious Executive Pre-Professional High School, having studied arduously to win admission. Once admitted, however, he becomes overwhelmed by the school's intense academic pressure. He has a longstanding crush on Nia, who is dating his best friend, Aaron. He feels alienated and unable to fit in.

His stress eventually manifests itself in an eating disorder, affects sleep habits, and suicidal thoughts. He takes a stand and goes to a psychiatrist who prescribes him Zoloft. He is elated for a brief period, and believes he is cured (what he calls "The Fake Shift")—so he decides to throw away the medicine. Consequently, his depression builds until, unable to fend off his suicidal ideation, he calls 1-800-SUICIDE and is admitted to a nearby psychiatric hospital. He is initially taken aback and feels he doesn't belong in a loony bin. With the adolescent floor of the hospital being under renovations, Craig is sent to stay on the adult floor. He meets many other patients, some friendly, others reclusive or delusional, and is supported and encouraged by his family and school principal once they learn of his hospitalization.

He is apprehensive about going back to school and talks to his psychiatrist, Dr. Minerva, about this. Craig meets a female patient, Noelle, who coped with a history of abuse by cutting her face with scissors. In isolation from the outside world, and with help from Noelle, Craig confronts the sources of his anxiety and regains his health.

During his recovery, Craig experiments with art, specifically stylized human figure maps, and discovers he has a great deal of natural talent and ability. He realizes his art makes him feel good and wishes to pursue it. Once Craig has recovered, his counselor suggests he transfer to an art school, a thought that excites him. However, he is scared of telling his father the same, who considers people at art school "messed up". He returns home at the novel's end, with a new energy to live life. He begins to appreciate the little things that make him happy.

== Major themes ==
Critics recognized many themes in It's Kind of a Funny Story, such as being yourself, and finding out who you are. Kirkus Reviews stated that the novel addresses "the influence of peer pressure", and how depression recovery can be attributed to being oneself and "acceptance for who he is".

== Reception ==
The book is widely celebrated, with it being selected in 2007 by the American Library Association for its list of the Best Books for Young Adults. It was also met with critical applause from multiple publications including the New York Times, who described it as—"Insightful and utterly authentic...this is an important book." However, some critics suggested that It's Kind of a Funny Story is a funny but sometimes dull story. Kirkus Reviews stated, "while these thoughts are truthful, it does not make them interesting". They also added, "what results in a slow start to an easy, occasionally long-winded novel". Despite the occasional dullness, they also praised the book to be "humorously poignant". Another critic, Jennifer Brabander from The Horn Book Magazine, also praised Vizzini, stating "despite the serious topic, Vizzini again manages to be quite funny".

== Background ==
It's Kind of a Funny Story is mostly based on the author Ned Vizzini's own experience in an adult psychiatric hospital in November 2004. In an interview with James Dick Blasingame, Vizzini stated, "It's Kind of a Funny Story was based on my real life and is 85% true."

== Film adaptation ==
In 2010, Focus Features released a film adaptation directed by Anna Boden and Ryan Fleck. The film starred Keir Gilchrist as Craig, along with Zach Galifianakis, Emma Roberts, Zoë Kravitz, Viola Davis, and Lauren Graham.

== Musical adaptation ==
As of 2017, NBC Theatrical is developing a stage musical version of It's Kind of a Funny Story with music composed by Drew Gasparini, book by Alex Brightman and orchestrations by Justin Goldner. This will mark the second musical adaptation of one of Vizzini’s novels, the first being Be More Chill. On November 14, 2025, 3 songs were released on Spotify and digital services.
