= Having Wonderful Time =

1938 film by Robert Parrish, Alfred Santell

- Theatrical release poster
- Directed by: Alfred Santell
- Written by: Morrie Ryskind; Ernest Pagano
- Screenplay by: Arthur Kober
- Based on: Having Wonderful Time; 1937 play by Arthur Kober
- Produced by: Marc Connelly
- Starring: Ginger Rogers; Douglas Fairbanks, Jr. Lucille Ball; Eve Arden; Richard "Red" Skelton
- Cinematography: Robert De Grasse
- Edited by: William Hamilton
- Music by: Roy Webb
- Production company: RKO Radio Pictures
- Distributed by: RKO Radio Pictures
- Release date: July 1, 1938
- Running time: 70 minutes
- Country: United States
- Language: English
- Budget: $966,000
- Box office: $1,008,000

Having Wonderful Time is a 1938 American romantic comedy film directed by Alfred Santell and starring Ginger Rogers and Douglas Fairbanks Jr., Lucille Ball and Eve Arden. It marked Red Skelton's film debut. The screenplay adapted from Arthur Kober's 1937 Broadway play of the same name. It was produced and distributed by the Hollywood studio RKO Pictures.

== Plot summary ==
Bored New York office girl Teddy goes to a vacation camp in the mountains, called Camp Kare Free, for rest and to get away from the noisy, busy, city life; the noisy, busy typing pool where she works, and the equally noisy, crowded apartment where she lives with four generations of her family. She also wants to avoid advances from Emil Beatty; her mother desperately wants her to marry him. The resort was recommended by her friend, Fay Coleman, who has already been there for a while, spending time with her boyfriend, Mac. Teddy meets waiter Chick at the train station and at first does not like him. Fay welcomes her to camp and introduces her to Mac. They are surprised that Teddy and Chick are on the outs. Mac explains that the waiters have to pay for their jobs; they make their money in tips, and most of them are college students. Chick is in law school. Teddy meets Fay's two other cabin-mates, Miriam and Henrietta. She also meets Buzzy Armbruster, a successful businessman who has a private cabin. Miriam has eyes for Buzzy, who seems to have eyes for every pretty girl. Soon, Teddy and Chick fall in love and spend every day together. The campers are of all ages, including old married couples, and all are entertained by Itchy the social director.

Teddy's last night at camp is the night of the Japanese Fiesta. She and Chick sit by the lake and talk about the future; it may take years before he can ask her to marry him, and she is willing to wait. But after they kiss, his love for her overwhelms him; he wants them to become lovers while they wait to marry. Teddy is shocked and angry and leaves him to go to the party, where she meets up with Buzzy. A thunderstorm rolls in, and the party moves to Teddy's cabin, where Chick is waiting. Teddy invites herself to Buzzy's cabin, where he asks her if they can "get together." She tells Buzzy she isn't interested, and he accepts her rejection calmly. When he suggests they play backgammon, Teddy shrieks with joy; she loves to play backgammon.

At the party, Miriam tells Chick about Buzzy's fascinating effect on women, including herself. Chick rushes in to save Teddy but becomes embarrassed when he sees the innocent board game. He returns to the party and waits on the porch for Teddy to come home. Hours pass, and after 12 games of backgammon (score 11 to 1 in Teddy's favor) Teddy tells an exhausted Buzzy to go lie down for a rest. He goes to bed, locking the door behind him. She opens the curtains so that she can be seen and pretends to be playing with Buzzy. Chick gives up waiting, and Teddy accidentally falls asleep at Buzzy's cabin and stays overnight. While trying to sneak out the next morning, Teddy is spotted by Miriam, who throws a rock through Buzzy's bedroom window.

Emil shows up to drive Teddy back to the city; at first she tries to put him off, but she sees Chick and invites Emil to breakfast. The two sit down to eat, with Chick as their waiter. All three of them overhear Miriam yelling at Buzzy for having Teddy stay overnight. Chick goes on a punching spree and follows Teddy out of the dining hall. The two reconcile, and he proposes. All they really need is a backgammon board, and she has one.

== Cast ==
- Ginger Rogers as Thelma "Teddy" Shaw
- Douglas Fairbanks, Jr. as Chick Kirkland
- Eve Arden as Henrietta
- Lucille Ball as Miriam "Screwball"
- Lee Bowman as Buzzy Armbruster
- Harlan Briggs as Mr. Shaw
- Jack Carson as Emil Beatty
- Peggy Conklin as Fay Coleman
- Inez Courtney as Emma, Teddy's Sister
- Dorothea Kent as Maxine
- Allan Lane as Maxwell "Mac" Pangwell
- Donald Meek as P.U. Rogers, Camp Owner
- Juanita Quigley as Mabel, Emma's Daughter
- Leona Roberts as Mrs. Shaw
- Shimen Ruskin as Shrimpo
- Richard "Red" Skelton as Itchy, Camp Social Director
- Grady Sutton as Gus
- Dorothy Tree as Frances
- Clarence H. Wilson as Mr. G
- Ann Miller as Vivian (uncredited)

== Production ==
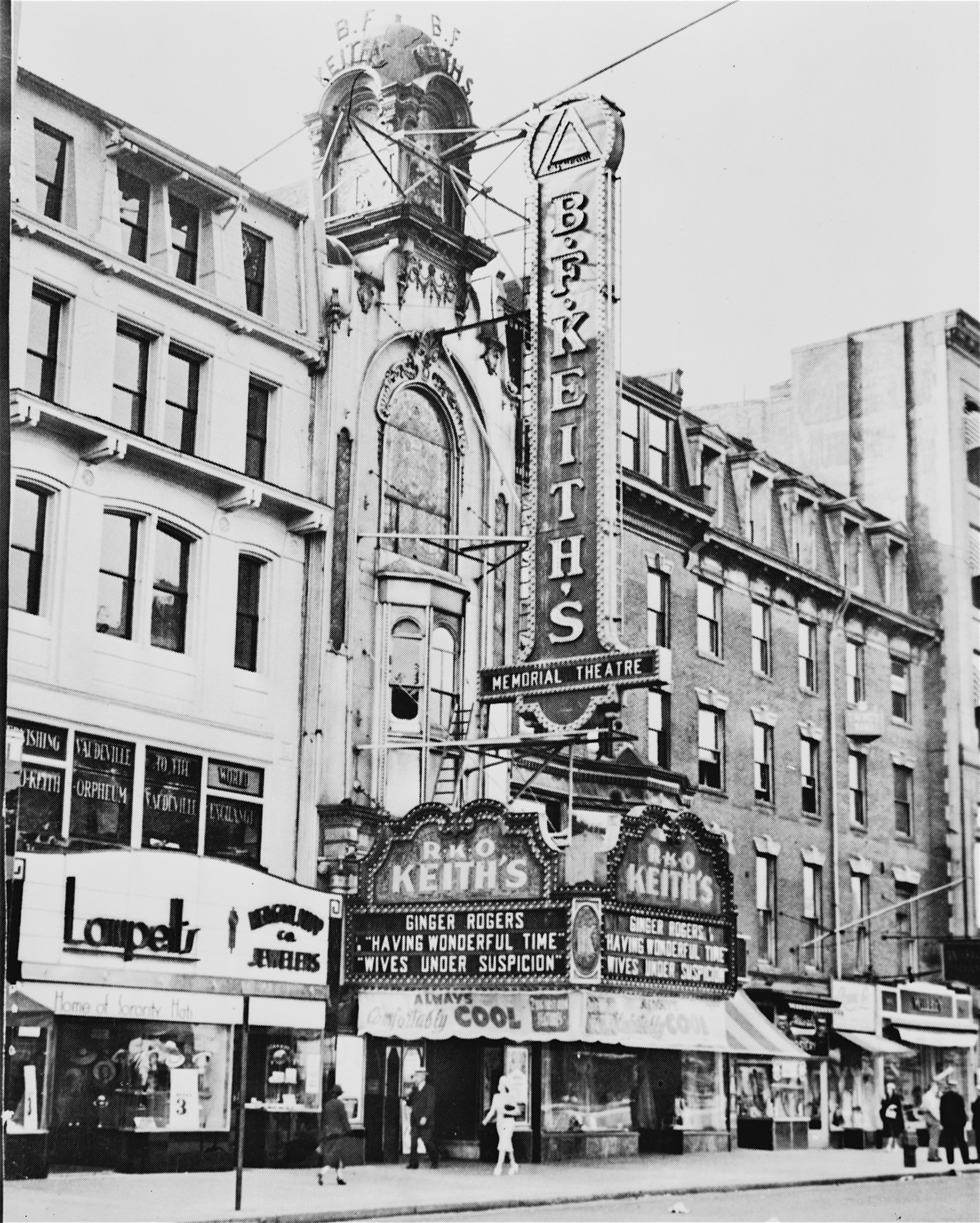
Boston theater showing the film

The film was based on the play of the same name, as was the 1952 musical Wish You Were Here. (The play's title has quotation marks around it to reflect the custom of vacationers sending letters and picture postcards to keep friends and family informed of their activities.and the cliché postcard message: "Having Wonderful Time. Wish You Were Here!") Produced by Marc Connelly, it had its original Broadway run at the Lyceum Theatre from 20 February 1937 to 8 January 1938. The cast included John Garfield, Katherine Locke, Sheldon Leonard, Philip Van Zandt and Cornel Wilde.

In the play, the resort is in the Catskills, the characters are Jewish, and much of the humor relies on an understanding of that context. TCM reports that Arthur Kober, author of the play and the screenplay told the New York Times: "Well, the Will Hays organization—and that, as you know, is the censor with a capital C—first went on record as saying that the play could not be done as a picture... the Jewish people might create misunderstanding, racial antagonism and all that. Thereupon, RKO very carefully explained that this angle would be entirely eliminated—that the picture would simply be about young people of the lower-middle class...So when I was called in to make the adaptation, the first thing I had to do was turn my Jewish characters into Gentiles. "

Skelton is credited as Richard (Red) Skelton. It includes the iconic "Doughnut Dunkers" routine that he developed with his wife, Edna (and eventually copyrighted in every possible combination of beverage and dunkable baked goods). That routine got him a job at New York City's Loew's State Theatre in 1937 and launched him into the big time on stage.

Skelton's part in this film was originally much larger. Douglas Fairbanks, Jr. wrote in his memoir, "...the big bosses at the studio were unable to appreciate Skelton's broad, slapstick style and cut his part down to the barest minimum needed to hold the slender plot together."

== Reception ==
The film recorded a loss of $267,000. A review in Variety felt "much of the charm, romantic tenderness and social problem features of Arthur Kober's stage play are missing in the screen version".

== Bibliography ==
- Tucker, David C. Eve Arden: A Chronicle of All Film, Television, Radio and Stage Performances. McFarland, 2014.
