= Andrew Kober =

American stage and screen actor (born 1984)

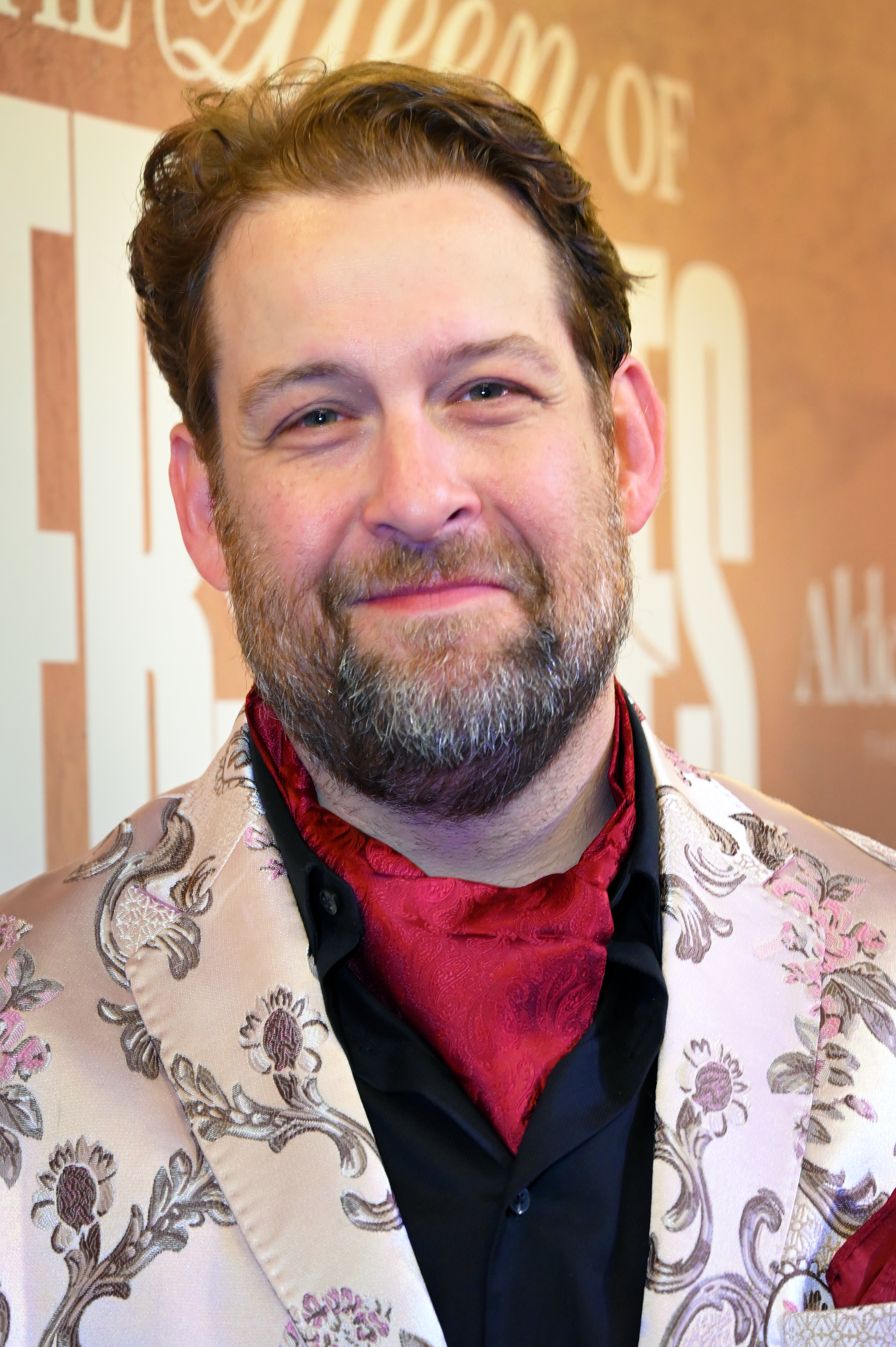
- Kober in 2025
- Born: February 20, 1984 (age 42)
- Education: Carnegie Mellon University (BFA)
- Occupations: Actor, musician
- Years active: 2008–present
- Spouse: Farra Kober (m. 2012)
- Children: 2
- Family: Arthur Kober (granduncle)
- Website: andrewkoberonline.com

Andrew Kober (February 20, 1981) is an American stage and screen actor, best known for playing the role of Margaret Mead in the 2009 Broadway revival of Hair.

== Early life ==
Kober grew up in Shaker Heights, Ohio. His granduncle Arthur Kober was born to a Jewish family in Eastern Europe, before immigrating to the United States.

He studied at Carnegie Mellon University in Pittsburgh, Pennsylvania, graduating with a degree in Acting in 2006. He moved to New York City later in the year, and continues to reside there today.

== Career ==
=== Theatre ===
In 2008, Kober was cast in the Off-Broadway Revival of Hair, in the featured role of Margaret Mead. He stayed with the production in its 2009 transfer to Broadway, as well as its 2010 transfer to the West End.

Following Hair, Kober was cast in multiple small roles in the Second Broadway Revival of Les Misérables, and performed with the company until late 2015. After that, he was cast in the ensemble of the She Loves Me Broadway Revival, which had the distinction of being the first Broadway show to be live-streamed internationally online.

Kober also performed in regional productions of The 25th Annual Putnam County Spelling Bee, Ken Ludwig's Baskerville, National Pastime, Sense & Sensibility, and Spamalot.

Kober performed in a musical adaption of Twelfth Night from September 2–5, 2016 at the Delacorte Theatre.

In 2017, Kober appeared in the Broadway revival of Sunday in the Park with George and the Los Angeles premier of Roman Holiday. In October 2017, began performing on Broadway in the cast of School of Rock. Kober took a hiatus from School of Rock in summer 2018 in order to perform as Malvolio in a Shakespeare in the Park production of Twelfth Night. Following the show's closing, he returned to the cast of School of Rock.

=== Film and TV work ===
Kober has also made multiple guest appearances on popular television shows, such as Boardwalk Empire, House of Cards, Blue Bloods, and Pan Am. He has been featured in the short film Chin Up, and can be seen in the filmed performance of She Loves Me.

=== Other work ===
Kober is also a part of the comedy group, The (M)orons, along with three fellow Broadway actors and writers: Drew Gasparini, F. Michael Haynie, and Alex Brightman.

== Personal life ==
Kober is married to Farra Kober, the director of social media and community for MSNBC. They married in 2012, and have a son born in 2016.

== Credits ==
=== Theatre ===
Year	Production	Role	Category	Location
2008	Hair	Margaret Mead / Father / Tribe Member u/s John Wilkes Booth	Off-Broadway	The Public Theater
2009	Hair	Margaret Mead / Father / Tribe Member u/s John Wilkes Booth	Broadway	Al Hirshfeld Theatre
2010	Hair	Margaret Mead / Father / Tribe Member u/s John Wilkes Booth	West End	Gielgud Theatre
2011	Spamalot	Sir Dennis Galahad / Prince Herbert's Father / The Black Knight	Regional	Patchogue Theatre
2014-15	Les Misérables	Innkeeper / Babet u/s Factory Foreman u/s Bamatabois	Broadway	Imperial Theatre
2015	Les Misérables	Babet / Innkeeper / Factory Foreman	Broadway	Imperial Theatre
2015	Les Misérables	Babet / Innkeeper / Factory Foreman u/s The Bishop of Digne	Broadway	Imperial Theatre
2016	She Loves Me	Ensemble u/s Georg Nowack u/s Ladislav Sipos	Broadway	Studio 54
2016	Twelfth Night	Malvolio	Off-Broadway	Delacorte Theatre
2017	Sunday in the Park with George	u/s Soldier / Alex u/s Jules / Bob Greenberg u/s Boatman / Lee Randolph u/s Franz / Dennis u/s Mr. / Charles Redmond	Broadway	Hudson Theatre
2017	Roman Holiday	Ensemble	Regional	Golden Gate Theatre
2017	School of Rock	Bob / Cop / Mr. Hamilton / Ensemble u/s Dewey	Broadway	Winter Garden Theatre
2018	Twelfth Night	Malvolio	Off-Broadway	Shakespeare in the Park
2019	Alice by Heart	King of Hearts / Dr Butridge / Jabberwocky / Duck / Mock Turtle	Off-Broadway	MCC Theater
2019	Beautiful: The Carole King Musical	Don Kirshner	Broadway	Stephen Sondheim Theatre
2019	Rodgers + Hammerstein's Cinderella	Jean-Michel	Regional	Paper Mill Playhouse
2022-23	Beetlejuice	s/b Beetlejuice s/b Adam s/b Charles	Broadway	Marquis Theatre
2023	Beetlejuice	Beetlejuice	Temporary engagement	US Tour
2024	How to Dance in Ohio	Michael / Derrick	Broadway	Belasco Theatre
2024	How to Dance in Ohio	Michael / Derrick	Concert	Palladium Times Square
2024-25	Gypsy	Mr. Goldstone / Cigar / Bougeron-Cochon u/s Herbie	Broadway	Majestic Theatre
2025	The Queen of Versailles	Pageant Host, Others	Broadway	St. James Theatre
2026	The Wild Party	Goldberg	Off-Broadway	New York City Center
2026	Giulia: The Poison Queen of Palermo	Pietro	Off-Broadway	Perelman Arts Center

=== Filmography ===
Year	Title	Role	Category	Notes
2011	Boardwalk Empire	Waiter	TV series	Episode: A Dangerous Maid
2011	Pan Am	Bob Operations Clerk	TV series	Episode: Unscheduled Departure
2013	House of Cards	Joe Taminini	TV series	Episode: Chapter 7
2012-13	City of Dreams	Tyler	TV series	2 episodes
2013	Blue Bloods	Joey Marsh	TV series	Episode: Growing Boys
2016	She Loves Me	Various	TV movie	Live Performance
