= Skittles (confectionery) =

Brand of fruit-flavored candy by Wrigley

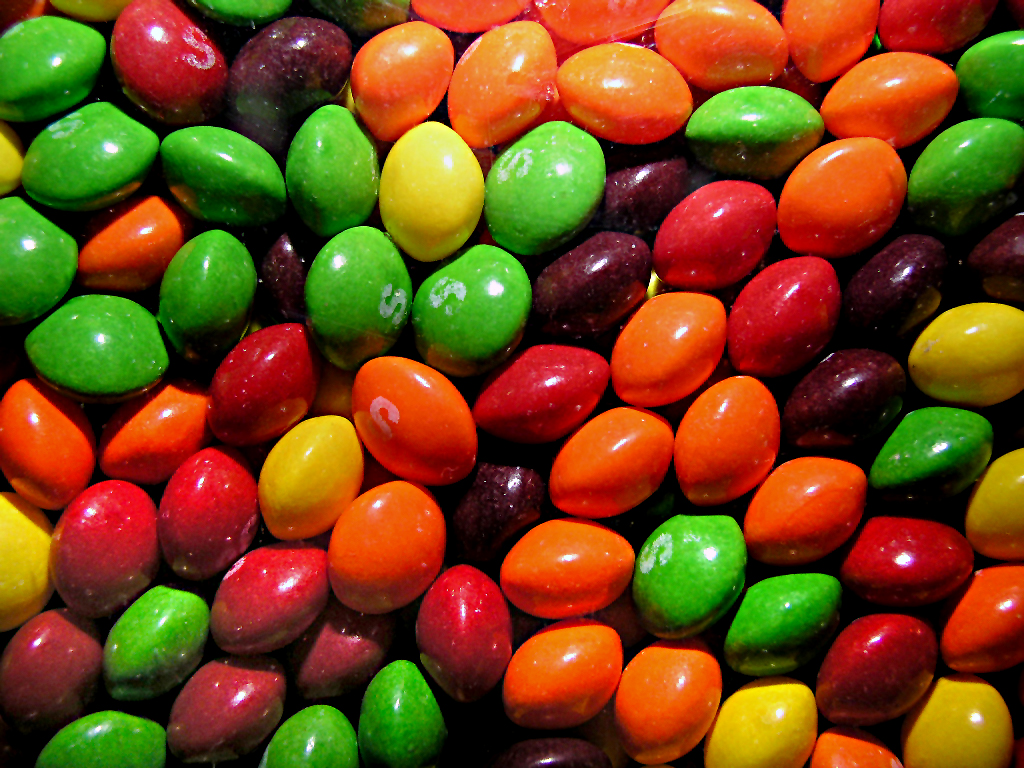
- Product type: Candy
- Current owner: Mars, Inc.
- Produced by: Wrigley Company
- Country: United Kingdom
- Introduced: 1971; 55 years ago
- Markets: Worldwide
- Website: skittles.com

Skittles
Nutritional value per 100 g (3.5 oz)
- Energy: 1,680 kJ (400 kcal)
- Carbohydrates: 90.7 g
- Sugars: 75.6 g
- Dietary fibre: 0 g
- Fat: 4.4 g
- Saturated: 3.9 g
- Trans: 0 g
- Protein: 0 g
Vitamins and minerals
Vitamins	Quantity %DV^{†}
Vitamin A equiv.	0% 0 μg
Vitamin C	29% 26 mg
Minerals	Quantity %DV^{†}
Calcium	0% 0 mg
Iron	0% 0 mg
Sodium	1% 15.1 mg
- Amounts converted and rounded to be relative to 100 g serving.
- ^{†}Percentages estimated using US recommendations for adults. Source: NutritionData

Skittles are multicolored fruit-flavored lentil-shaped sweets produced and marketed by the Wrigley Company, a division of Mars Inc.

Skittles consist of hard sugar shells imprinted with the letter 'S' in lowercase, similar to M&M's which have the letter 'M'. The interior consists mainly of sugar, corn syrup, and hydrogenated palm kernel oil along with fruit juice, citric acid, and natural and artificial flavors. Skittles are sold in a variety of flavor collections, such as Tropical, Wild Berry, Smoothie, and Sour.

== History and overview ==
Skittles were introduced in 1971 by Jack Candies, a British distributor for Mars, Incorporated. An animated television advertisement from 1974 bears the logo of the "Galaxy" company and is copyrighted by Jack Candies Ltd. Mars was granted a trademark from the U.S. Patent Office for the name Skittles in 1974. By 1979, Skittles became widely distributed throughout the U.S. In 1982, production of Skittles began in the United States. Mars' Wrigley division acquired the Skittles company in 2008.

The name of the candy, Skittles, comes from the sports game of the same name, named as such for the resemblance of the sweet to items used in the game.

Skittles' "taste the rainbow" theme was created by the New York ad agency D'Arcy Masius Benton & Bowles.

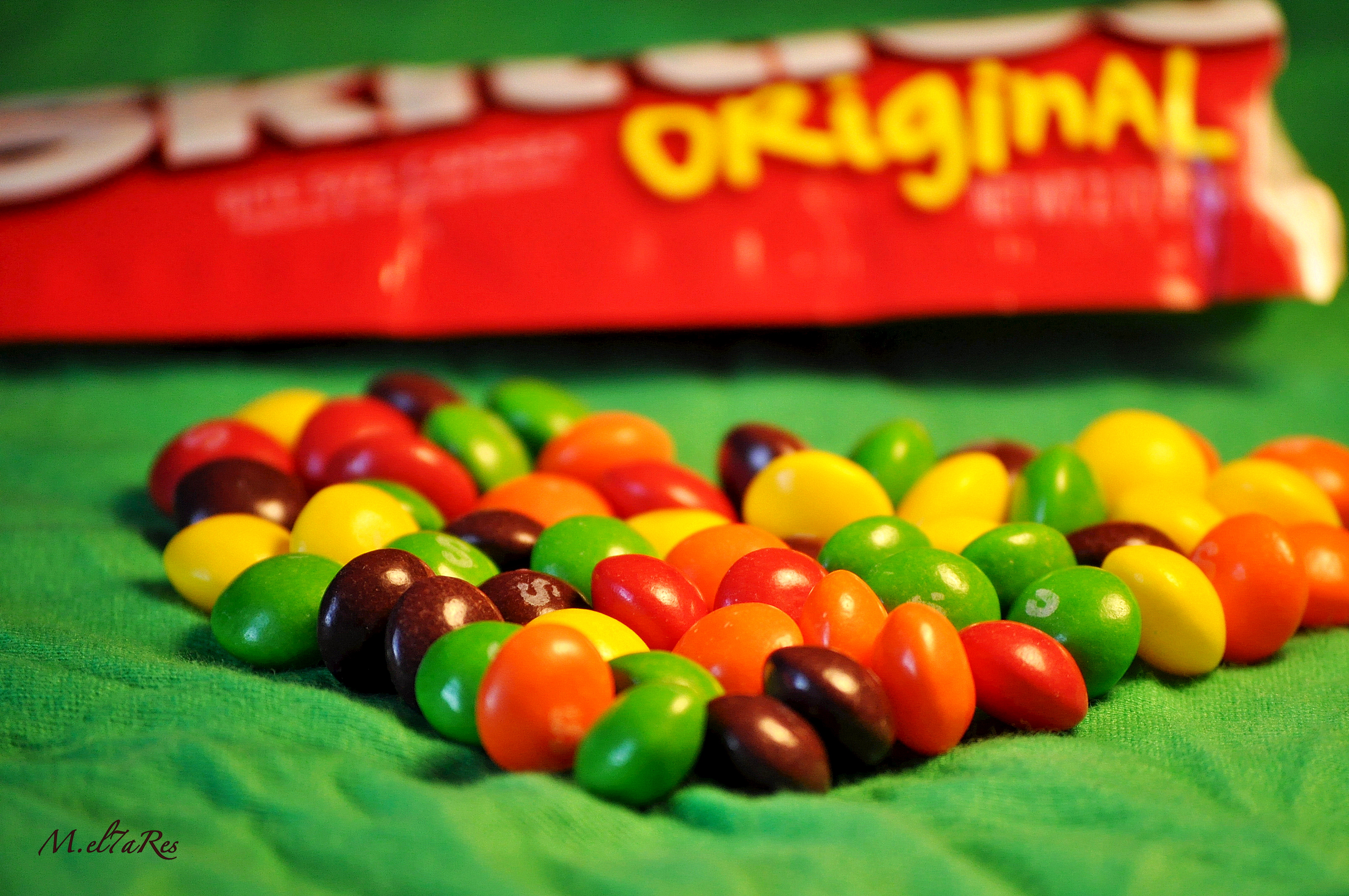
Skittles candies and pack

On March 2, 2009, Skittles launched a web-based marketing campaign where the official website became a small overlay with options to view different social media sites in the main area, including its official YouTube channel, a Facebook profile, and a Twitter account. The move was debated by people interested in social media.

In 2009, the production of Skittles ceased using animal-derived gelatin, making them suitable for vegetarians, vegans, and certain religious groups.

Skittles were involved in two political incidents in the 2010s. In the aftermath of the killing of Trayvon Martin, protestors used Skittles, which Martin had reportedly been carrying along with Arizona watermelon fruit-flavored juice drink, as a symbol during rallies. Though Mars' brief statement of condolences was criticized by some outlets, such as Adweek, for being too subdued, Mars' response in 2016 to a Skittles-based image macro (which was posted by Donald Trump Jr. on his Twitter feed as an analogy for immigration) was praised for its tact and directness. MWWPR said Mars' responses could influence public relations best practices.

In 2016, Skittles faced controversy over temporarily changing the color of the candies from the signature rainbow appearance to white in support of Pride month, LGBT rights and London Pride. The Wrigley Company, a separate representing party of the Skittles brand, mass-produced the limited-edition colorless candies. Skittles' rainbow themed packaging had also been altered temporarily to complement the achromatic confectionery within. On the back of each monochrome package, the Wrigley Company included an explanation for the company's marketing decision: "So this is kind of awkward, but we're just gonna go ahead and address the rainbow-colored elephant in the room. You have the rainbow... we have the rainbow... and usually that's just hunky-dory. But this Pride, only one rainbow deserves to be the centre of attention - yours. And we're not going to be the ones to steal your rainbow thunder, no siree." However, the message was met with confusion in some areas, with The Huffington Post publishing an article titled "Some People Think Skittles' All-White Pride Candies Are Racist", exploring the idea that by going all-white, the company failed to acknowledge the diversity defined by the LGBT community.

Every June, Skittles repeats the colorless marketing to spread Pride awareness and raise proceeds for an LGBT charity, such as the Switchboard helpline in the United Kingdom. For the 2020 Pride edition, Skittles changed the candy colors from a rainbow to all gray in the United States, with the tagline "Only one rainbow matters during PRIDE". However, the white color continued to be used in countries such as the United Kingdom.

Skittles' marketing has become known for its avant-garde viral marketing techniques, particularly in conjunction with the Super Bowl. In 2018, it produced a Super Bowl commercial that was viewed by only one person. In 2019, it conducted a pre-Super Bowl campaign featuring Skittles Commercial: The Broadway Musical, which was performed one time only at The Town Hall in New York City.

Skittles are commonly used to effectively treat hypoglycemia in diabetics.

In July 2022, a lawsuit seeking class-action status was filed in California regarding the continued use of titanium dioxide as a coloring agent. The lawsuit was voluntarily dismissed without prejudice in November 2022.

In March 2023, Democratic California Assemblyman Jesse Gabriel introduced Bill 418 to the California Assembly that would ban production, sales, and consumption of all foods and drinks (for example Skittles, Pez, Sour Patch Kids, Campbell Soup, etc.) that contain titanium dioxide and four other harmful additives, propylparaben, red dye 3, brominated vegetable oil, and potassium bromate, across the state of California, all five of which have been linked to causing cancer and other health problems. At least three of these additives are banned by the European Union from use in food. Titanium dioxide was removed from the list before the bill was voted on. The bill passed, making California the first US state to adopt the European Union's ban on these cancer-causing chemical additives from being used in food and drink products.

== Varieties ==
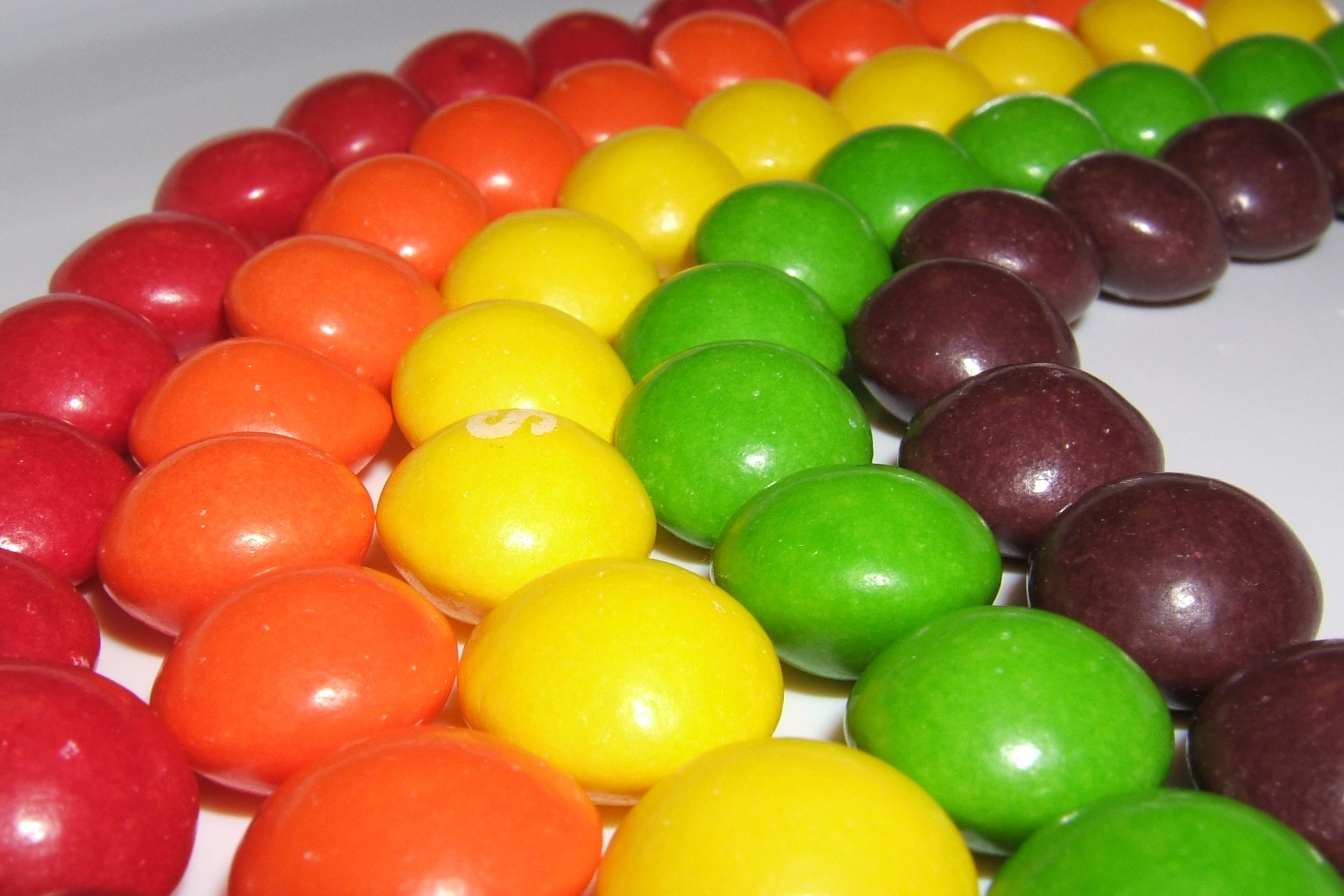
A "rainbow" of Skittles varieties

Skittles are produced in a wide variety of flavors and colors, including sour varieties. Skittles has hinted at new flavor releases on its Facebook page, using such statuses as "Locking myself in the Rainbow kitchen until I see some results!" A 2011 posting contained confirmation of a new flavor: "Putting the last touches on a new Skittles flavor. Tweak the Rainbow."

In the United States and Canada, in 2013, Skittles replaced the lime-flavored Skittles with green apple, causing a backlash from many consumers. The lime flavor became part of the Darkside packets, which were discontinued in 2015 and followed up by the Orchards packets, which were discontinued in 2017. Lime was also part of the "Long Lost Lime" packets that came out in summer 2017 and 2018. The Darkside flavor was revived in 2019. In 2021, the "All Lime" packets containing only the lime flavor were released for a limited time. In September 2021, Skittles announced that the green apple-flavored Skittles would be replaced with the original lime flavor. In 2022, Skittles Gummies were released. In October 2024, Skittles released their own version of freeze-dried Skittles called Skittles POP'd. It comes in the Original and Sour Skittles flavors.

== See also ==
- Jelly beans
- List of confectionery brands
- M&M's
- Skittles Commercial: The Broadway Musical
- Smarties (tablet candy)
