= Arthur Kober =

American dramatist

- Born: Arthur Kober; August 25, 1900; Brody, Galicia, Austria-Hungary
- Died: June 12, 1975 (aged 74); New York City, U.S.
- Occupation: Writer
- Spouses: Lillian Hellman (m. 1925; div. 1932); Margaret Frohnknecht (m. 1941; died 1951)
- Children: 1
- Relatives: Andrew Kober (grandnephew)

Arthur Kober (August 25, 1900 – June 12, 1975) was an American humorist, author, press agent, and screenwriter. He was married to the dramatist Lillian Hellman.

== Biography ==
=== Early life ===
Kober was born into a Jewish family in Brody, Galicia, in what was then the Austro-Hungarian Empire (now part of western Ukraine). His family emigrated to the United States when he was 4. They first moved to Harlem before settling in The Bronx.

He attended the High School Of Commerce (later known as Louis D. Brandeis High School) for one semester before working at a series of jobs, including as a stock clerk at Gimbels. He then found work as a theatrical press agent for the Shubert brothers, Jed Harris, Herman Shumlin, and Ruth Draper.

His grandnephew is actor Andrew Kober.

Kober married Lillian Hellman on December 31, 1925. During their marriage, they often lived apart. They divorced in 1932, after Hellman had started a relationship with Dashiell Hammett. He later married Margaret Frohnknecht in 1941, who died in 1951. They had one daughter, Catherine.

=== Writing career ===
Kober began writing humorous short fiction for The New Yorker in 1926 and became a prolific contributor. Many of his characters, such as the husband-hunter Bella Gross, were based on his Jewish upbringing in the Bronx. His New Yorker stories were later collected in the anthologies Thunder Over the Bronx (1935), Pardon Me for Pointing (1939), My Dear Bella (1941), Parm Me (1945), Bella, Bella Kissed a Fella (1951), and Oooh, What You Said! (1958).

He became a screenwriter in Hollywood, working on about 30 films in the 1930s and 1940s, including The Little Foxes (1938), based on Hellman's semi-autobiographical play.

Kober wrote the Broadway play Having Wonderful Time, a comedy set in a Jewish resort in the Catskills. It was staged in 1937 and the following year it was made into a Hollywood film, though the Jewish ethnic humor was sanitized. It was adapted as a stage musical, Wish You Were Here, in 1952.

Kober died of cancer in New York on June 12, 1975, at the age of 74. He was portrayed by David Paymer in the 1999 film, Dash and Lilly.

== Works ==
=== Screenwriting ===
- It Pays to Advertise (1931 adaptation)
- Up Pops the Devil (1931)
- The False Madonna (1931)
- The Secret Call (1931)
- Me and My Gal (1932)
- Make Me a Star (1932 screenplay)
- Hat Check Girl (1932)
- Guilty as Hell (1932)
- Meet the Baron (1933)
- Broadway Bad (1933)
- One Man's Journey (1933)
- It's Great to Be Alive (1933)
- Headline Shooter (1933)
- Infernal Machine (1933)
- Mama Loves Papa (1933 screenplay)
- Bondage (1933)
- Hollywood Party (1934 screenplay)
- Palooka (1934 screenplay)
- Ginger (1935 screenplay/story)
- Calm Yourself (1935 screenplay)
- The Great Hotel Murder (1935)
- The Big Broadcast of 1937 (1936 story)
- Early to Bed (1936 screenplay)
- Having Wonderful Time (1938 screenplay)
- The Mad Miss Manton (1938, uncredited)
- The Little Foxes (1941, additional scenes and dialogue)
- Wintertime (1943 story)
- In the Meantime, Darling (1944)
- Don Juan Quilligan (1945)
- My Own True Love (1949 adaptation)

=== Playwriting ===
- Having Wonderful Time (1937)
- Wish You Were Here (1952)
- A Mighty Man is He (1960)

=== Television writing ===
- Leave It to Beaver (1960)
- Harrigan and Son (1960)
- My Three Sons (1961)

=== Books ===
- Thunder Over the Bronx (1935)
- Pardon Me for Pointing (1939)
- My Dear Bella (1941)
- Parm Me (1945)
- That Man is Here Again: The Adventures of a Hollywood Agent (1946)
- Bella, Bella Kissed a Fella (1951)
- Oooh, What You Said! (1958)
