= Franz Quirin von Kober =

German priest

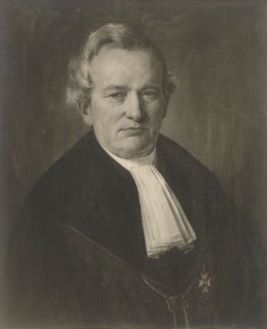
Franz Quirin von Kober

Franz Quirin von Kober (6 March 1821 at Warthausen, Biberach, Württemberg – 25 January 1897 at Tübingen) was a German Roman Catholic priest, known as a canon lawyer and pedagogist.

== Life ==
He first attended the Latin school in of Biberach, and subsequently, in accordance with the course prescribed for Catholic theologians of the Diocese of Rottenburg, entered the preparatory seminary at Ethigen on the Danube. From 1840 to 1844 he pursued his studies in the seminary (Wilhelmsstift) of Tübingen and, on 4 September 1845, was ordained priest in Rottenburg am Neckar.

After half a year's activity in the cure of souls at Ulm, Franz Kober became a tutor in seminary at Tübingen, and lectured on philology and the Pauline Epistles. From 1848, he taught canon law, in opposition to the Josephinist professor Warnkonig, of the faculty of law: Catholic theological students in Württemberg had depended on this faculty for the training in canon law according to a custom existing in Austria since Emperor Joseph II.

On 28 January 1851, Kober became professor extraordinary in the faculty of Catholic theology, teaching pedagogy, didactics, and the Pauline Epistles. He was appointed professor ordinary of canon law and pedagogy on 8 September 1857, having been professor extraordinary since 19 April 1853.

== Works ==
He wrote with the historico-legal method some of his works:

- "Der Kirchenbann" (1857);
- "Die Suspension der Kirchendiener" (1862);
- "Die Deposition und Degradation" (1867).

He also treated various ecclesiastico-criminal subjects ("Das Interdikt"; "Die körperliche Züchtigung als kirchliches Strafmittel gegen Kleriker und Mönche", "Die Gefangnisstrafe gegen Kleriker und Mönche"; "Die Geldstrafen im Kirchenrecht") in a series of essays, the majority being lengthy treatises, published in the "Archiv für katholisches Kirchenrecht" and especially in the "Theologische Quartalschrift" of Tübingen. In the last-named periodical, other essays on canon law appeared ("Der Ursprung und die rechtliche Stellung der Generalvikare"; "Der Einfluss der Kirche und ihrer Gesetzgebung auf Gesittung, Humanität und Zivilisation", "Medizin und Kirchenrecht"; "Die Residenz-pflicht der Kirchendiener bei feindlichen Verfolgungen und ansteckenden Krankheiten") and many book reviews.

Kober was also a frequent contributor to the first and second edition of the Freiburg Kirchenlexikon.
