= Skittles Commercial: The Broadway Musical =

2019 musical

Skittles Commercial
- The Broadway Musical
- Music: Drew Gasparini
- Lyrics: Nathaniel Lawlor
- Book: Will Eno and Nathaniel Lawlor
- Premiere: February 3, 2019: The Town Hall, New York City

Skittles Commercial: The Broadway Musical is an advertising musical with book by Pulitzer Prize finalist Will Eno and advertising creative director Nathaniel Lawlor, with lyrics by Nathaniel Lawlor, music by Drew Gasparini, and choreography by Raja Feather Kelly, artistic director of the New Brooklyn Theatre. The show was directed by OBIE Award-winner Sarah Benson, artistic director of the Soho Rep, starred Golden Globe and Screen Actors Guild Award winner Michael C. Hall. Producers on the musical were Jason Georgan, Patrick Milling-Smith, Brian Carmody, Allison Kunzman. It was created by Mars, Incorporated, parent company of confectionery brand Skittles, and produced by advertising agency DDB, commercial production company Smuggler, and marketing companies ICF Next and Tribal Worldwide in lieu of a Super Bowl commercial for Super Bowl LIII.

The show had a single performance at The Town Hall on 43rd Street between Broadway and 6th Avenue in New York City at 1pm on Super Bowl Sunday, February 3, 2019. Proceeds from the performance and related merchandise were donated to Broadway Cares/Equity Fights AIDS, with additional matching funds donated by Mars.

Prior to the public announcement of the musical in January 2019, the show was identified as Winter Live Industrial during auditions, a reference to industrial musicals. Two promotional videos were released: one featuring Hall appearing to discuss his participation in the show with a psychiatrist, and the other, the cast recording a version of the show's second song, "Advertising Ruins Everything." The marketing team described the promotion of brand awareness in the three weeks leading up to the Super Bowl as the campaign's primary purpose; the show itself served as "purely proof of concept" and was not televised.

== Synopsis ==
The performance begins outside the theater before the show's formal start, with vendors outside the theater selling purportedly unauthorized knockoff Skittles Commercial: The Broadway Musical T-shirts at half the price of the T-shirts sold inside. In the theater, attendees were also allowed onstage prior to the start of the show, where Skittles were sold in a mock bodega that also served as the set for the musical's opening scene.

The musical itself lasts approximately thirty minutes and while it announced as not having an intermission has a brief break between the first and final two scenes. The first scene takes place in a New York City bodega before the Super Bowl. A clerk and a man who claims to run the store (but in fact does not) have a conversation about the Super Bowl, the ephemerality of life, and the nature of existence, stating that "if we could live our lives backwards, everything would be an omen". Customers enter the store to purchase items for Super Bowl Sunday and start to break into song, only to be silenced when the clerk points out the "No Singing" sign behind the register.

Michael C. Hall enters the store, dressed in a cat costume. He explains that it's for performing that afternoon in a Broadway musical for Skittles, but when asked what the performance is about, he says that he does not know or understand who would pay to be there. Mysterious lights start flashing and all the actors freeze except for the clerk, who pleads for unseen individuals not to ruin his store. The lights disappear, and Hall sings the shows first song, "This Might Have Been a Bad Idea," which begins with Hall fearing that performing in a Skittles ad will destroy his career. However, after he eats some Skittles, he decides that the musical will be a big success, though the bodega chorus continues to express doubts.

The show then segues to its next scene, in which actors (and at least one company representative) in the audience question Hall about the performance thus far. The sequence riffs on the name of theater, The Town Hall, by creating an actual town hall with people asking long multi-part questions, criticizing the show's content, complaining about the theater's acoustics, and calling for a creation of a national high-speed rail system. Hall quits in frustration, the curtain falls, and an announcer explains that the show has to end early.

The next scene takes place on a set after the show on a set modeled after the outside of The Town Hall theater, complete with the show's actual posters and a vendor selling the fake knockoff T-shirts. In the song "Advertising Ruins Everything," audience members leaving the show complain about the show and blame both Hall and Skittles for betraying them. Hall defends advertising, but after the audience members explain how advertising has ruined various aspects of their lives, he vows never to perform in another ad so long as he can act. However, he once again starts praising Skittles, "the perfect treat for this anti-capitalist uprising" and informs the crowd that they themselves are merely actors in a Skittles commercial, which sparks a riot. The angry crowd tears down the curtain, which opens into a rearranged alternate universe version of the bodega. Skittles rain down from a broken ventilation shaft as the crowd trashes the bodega, but they flee when they discover that Michael C. Hall has been killed by an overturned ATM. A bear crawls across the stage.

In the final scene, Hall's ghost, wearing chains, meets the spirits of "quote machine" Winston Churchill and Amelia Earhart. In the final song, "This Definitely Was a Bad Idea," audience members complain about the time and money wasted on the play, an advertising executive laments the show's failure to achieve marketing goals, and an exasperated Hall laments being killed. However, a news report reveals that nearly 600 packs of Skittles were sold at the show, leading everyone except Hall to conclude that Hall's death now has meaning and the show was a success. The curtain falls.

== Cast ==
- Michael C. Hall
- Melvin Abston
- Max Chernin
- Ashkon Davaran
- Lulu Fall
- Stephanie Gibson
- David Hess
- Mylinda Hull
- Miguel Jarquin-Moreland
- Howard Kaye
- Kathie Kneese
- Raymond J. Lee
- Julia Macchio
- Will Mann
- Mike McGowan
- Gayle Turner
- Mark Zimmerman

== Reception ==
The musical was cited by multiple critics as one of the most successful advertising campaigns conducted in conjunction with the 2019 Super Bowl. The show's blend of overtly commercial entertainment with a meta-level critique of advertising was one commonly praised feature, as were its multiple satirical references to pop culture and Broadway, including avant garde existentialism and theatre of the absurd, the ending of Dexter (Hall sings that after killing his agent he will run away and grow a beard so no one will recognize him), Shakespeare's The Winter's Tale (which has the stage direction, "Exit, pursued by a bear"), Elsa's dress transformation in the Frozen musical, and the "You Will Be Found" sequence in Dear Evan Hansen, in which a spike in online followers is celebrated for giving meaning to a character's death.

The show was seen as a callback to the industrial musical tradition in advertising.
