= Georgia Kober =

American pianist

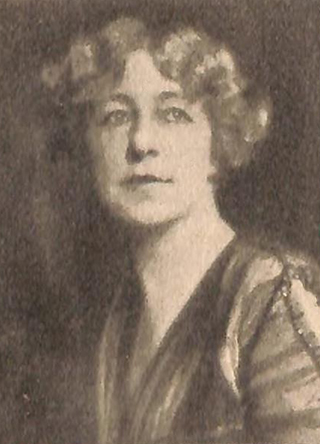
- Georgia Kober, from a 1925 publication
- Born: 1873; Indiana, U.S.
- Died: September 14, 1942; Palo Alto, California, U.S.
- Occupation(s): Pianist, music educator

Georgia L. Kober (1873 – September 14, 1942) was a pianist and music educator. For over 30 years, she was a piano instructor and president of the Sherwood School of Music in Chicago.

== Early life and education ==
Kober was born in Indiana, the daughter of George Charles Kober and Rhoda Wanamaker Lewis Kober. Her father was a Union Army veteran of the American Civil War. She studied piano with William Hall Sherwood in Chicago, and with Ossip Gabrilowitsch and Josef Lhévinne.

== Career ==
Kober was a concert pianist and music teacher based in Chicago. She performed and lectured often in midwestern cities, played in Texas in 1922, and toured in California in 1923. She made two recordings of piano music in 1924, for the Victor label. Several Chicago composers, including Theodora Sturkow-Ryder, dedicated piano compositions to Kober.

Kober was piano instructor and president of the Sherwood School of Music for more than 30 years. Her faculty included conductors Daniel Protheroe and Isaac Van Grove, soprano Genevra Johnstone Bishop, and music historian Glenn Dillard Gunn. She resigned from the presidency of the Sherwood School in 1942, and received an honorary Doctor of Music degree from the school shortly before she died later that year.

== Personal life ==
Kober died in 1942, in Palo Alto, California, in her late sixties. Her large collection of sheet music was given to the Community Music School in San Francisco after she died, except for a copy of a Mephisto Waltz autographed by Franz Liszt, which went to the San Francisco Public Library.
