= It's Kind of a Funny Story (film) =

- Theatrical release poster
- Directed by: Anna Boden; Ryan Fleck
- Screenplay by: Anna Boden; Ryan Fleck
- Based on: It's Kind of a Funny Story by Ned Vizzini
- Produced by: Kevin Misher; Ben Browning
- Starring: Keir Gilchrist; Emma Roberts; Viola Davis; Lauren Graham; Jim Gaffigan; Zoë Kravitz; Zach Galifianakis
- Cinematography: Andrij Parekh
- Edited by: Anna Boden
- Music by: Broken Social Scene
- Production companies: Misher Films; Wayfare Entertainment
- Distributed by: Focus Features
- Release dates: September 26, 2010 (Milwaukee); October 8, 2010 (United States)
- Running time: 101 minutes
- Country: United States
- Language: English
- Budget: $8 million
- Box office: $6.5 million

It's Kind of a Funny Story is a 2010 American comedy drama film written and directed by Anna Boden and Ryan Fleck, an adaptation of Ned Vizzini's 2006 novel. The film stars Keir Gilchrist, Zach Galifianakis, Emma Roberts, and Viola Davis. It was released in the United States on October 8, 2010, and received generally mixed reviews.

== Plot ==
Contemplating suicide, depressed teenager Craig Gilner seeks help at a local hospital. After telling a doctor named Dr. Mahmoud that he needs immediate help, Craig is admitted for five days at the hospital's adult psychiatric floor, due to the temporary closure of the psychiatric floor for adolescents.

Craig's hospitalization was spurred on by the stress of his academically competitive high school and upcoming summer program applications. He was also facing feelings of inferiority in the shadow of his best friend Aaron, and pressure from his father to succeed academically. At first, Craig is uncertain if he made the right choice to stay on the psychiatric floor, fearing his friends may find out where he is, particularly Nia, his crush and Aaron's girlfriend.

Throughout his stay, Craig bonds with various patients in the psychiatric unit. Craig is introduced to Bobby (Zach Galifianakis), a patient who takes Craig under his wing. During a group discussion, Craig learns that Bobby is stressed about an upcoming interview, hoping to move to a group home. Bobby worries that the sweater he is wearing is all he has to wear for the interview, so Craig offers him one of his dad's dress shirts to wear.

Noelle (Emma Roberts), a patient admitted for self-harm, is impressed by Craig's kindness, and leaves him a note to meet with her later on. They attend a painting session for patients together, where Craig paints a picture of an imaginary city map which he describes as "like my own brain". Bobby tells Craig he is a father of a little girl, and has attempted to kill himself six times. As Craig tries to help Bobby with his problems, Bobby, in turn, helps Craig gain the courage to ask out Noelle.

One night, Nia stops by the hospital to visit Craig, revealing that she and Aaron have broken up. Craig invites Nia to his room, where she tries to seduce him. However, they are interrupted by Craig's roommate, Muqtada, who has not left their shared room during his stay. As Nia runs out, Craig chases her, declaring he loves her, unaware that Noelle is standing behind him. Upset, Noelle storms off, leaving behind a self-portrait she had planned to give him.

Craig eventually wins Noelle's forgiveness, and the pair briefly sneak out of the ward, onto the hospital roof. There, Noelle asks him out, and they kiss. Craig has an interview with the head physician, Dr. Minerva; he explains that he has realized that he wants to become an artist, and is thankful his problems aren't as bad as others.

That night, Craig asks the staff for a pizza party, so the patients can say goodbye to him and Bobby—both are being discharged the following day. Craig calls Aaron, asking him to bring a particular record. When Aaron arrives, he tells him that he and Nia are working out their problems and they hug. At the party, Craig plays the record of Egyptian music, bringing Muqtada out of his room. He tells Bobby they should meet again after they are discharged, which he considers, and Bobby thanks him for changing his future outlook.

After Craig is discharged, he narrates a montage showing he has started dating Noelle, become better friends with Aaron and Nia, and begun pursuing his goal to become an artist. Craig has broken the news to his dad that he is not going to follow the path he intended for him, which his dad understands. Craig affirms that, while his stay didn't cure his condition, it significantly helped him, and he can get through the rest of his life with the help of his family and friends.

== Cast ==
- Keir Gilchrist as Craig Gilner
- Emma Roberts as Noelle
- Zach Galifianakis as Bobby
- Viola Davis as Dr. Eden Minerva
- Lauren Graham as Lynn Gilner
- Jim Gaffigan as George Gilner
- Zoë Kravitz as Nia
- Jeremy Davies as Smitty
- Matthew Maher as Humble
- Adrian Martinez as Johnny
- Bernard White as Muqtada
- Daniel London as Solomon
- Novella Nelson as The Professor
- MacIntyre Dixon as Roger
- Aasif Mandvi as Dr. Mahmoud
- Lou Myers as Jimmy
- Thomas Mann as Aaron Fitzcarraldo
- Mary Birdsong as Bobby's ex-wife
- Willian Silvan as Willian
- Morgan Murphy as Joanie
- Dana DeVestern as Alissa Gilner
- Ethan Herschenfeld as Solomon (Acid Head)

== Production ==
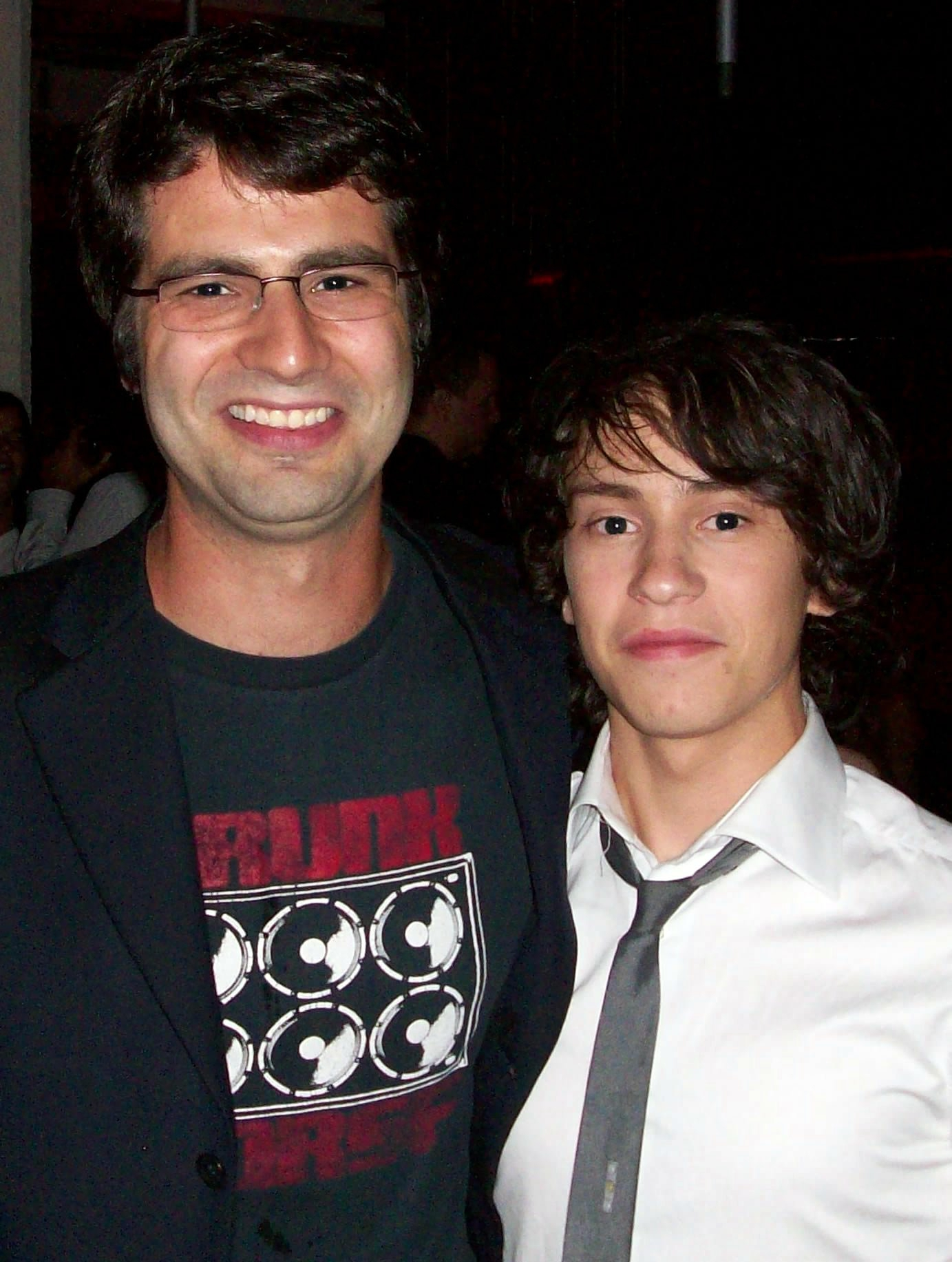
Ned Vizzini, writer of the novel, and Keir Gilchrist, leading actor in the film, at 2010 Toronto International Film Festival.

In May 2006, Paramount Pictures and MTV Films acquired the film rights to the novel. Anna Boden and Ryan Fleck were hired to adapt the screenplay. The film was later placed in turnaround and bought by Focus Features.

Production began in New York City on November 30, 2009. Principal photography took about six weeks, ending on February 2, 2010. Scenes taking place in the fictional Executive Pre-Professional High School were shot at Poly Prep Country Day School in Brooklyn, while Woodhull Medical Center in Brooklyn stood in for Argenon Hospital.

As of May 13, 2010, the film completed editing. Canadian indie rock band Broken Social Scene worked on the score for the film.

== Release ==
The film was originally scheduled for a limited release in the United States on September 24, 2010. Focus Features later opted for a wide release of approximately 500 theaters across the US and a release date of October 8, 2010. The film premiered at the 2010 Toronto International Film Festival.

To coincide with the film's release, Hyperion Books published a new edition of the novel, featuring photos from the film on the cover.

The film aired on HBO cable in the summer of 2011.

== Reception ==
On Rotten Tomatoes, the film holds a 58% approval rating based on 137 reviews with an average rating of 6/10. The critics consensus states "It's amiable, and it does a surprisingly good job of sidestepping psych ward comedy clichés, but given its talented cast and directors, It's Kind of a Funny Story should be more than just mildly entertaining." On Metacritic, the film has an weighted average score of 63, based on 33 reviews, which indicates "generally favorable" reviews.

Justin Chang of Variety wrote: "The filmmakers fully retain their offbeat sensibility and attentiveness to character while providing perhaps the sharpest showcase yet for Zach Galifianakis' outsized talents." Peter Travers of Rolling Stone wrote: "I don't blame you for backing off a movie that focuses on a suicidal teen who learns warm life lessons by spending five days in a Brooklyn hospital's psych ward. Stop worrying. It's Kind of a Funny Story, based on Ned Vizzini's semiautobiographical novel, breaks the jinx."

Michael Rechtshaffen of The Hollywood Reporter called it "A dramatically inert, lethargic dramedy that isn't nearly as quirky and poignant as it perceives itself." Ann Hornaday of The Washington Post gave the film a negative review, saying "There's very little that's even kind of funny in It's Kind of a Funny Story, which can't accurately be described as a comedy but isn't a true drama, either."

== Home media ==
It's Kind of a Funny Story was released on DVD and Blu-ray Disc on February 8, 2011.
