= Farra Kober =

- Education: Brown University (2006)
- Occupations: Producer, digital content strategist
- Spouse: Andrew Kober (m. 2012)
- Children: 1

Farra Kober is an American television producer and digital content strategist.

== Career ==
Kober is currently the Director of Social Media and Community at MSNBC.

== Personal life ==
In 2012, she married actor Andrew Kober, with whom she has a son, born 2016.

== Awards ==
Year	Award	Category	Work	Result
2014	Shorty Award	Best Use of Social Media for News	Goodbye DOMA, Hello Marriage Equality	Won
2013	Emmy Award	Outstanding Live Event Turnaround	2012 Summer Olympics	Won
2013	Webby Award	News & Information	The Social Election: MSNBC 2012	Nominated
2012	Webby Award	Events & Live Webcasts	NBC's Education Nation	Won
