= Ned Vizzini =

American writer

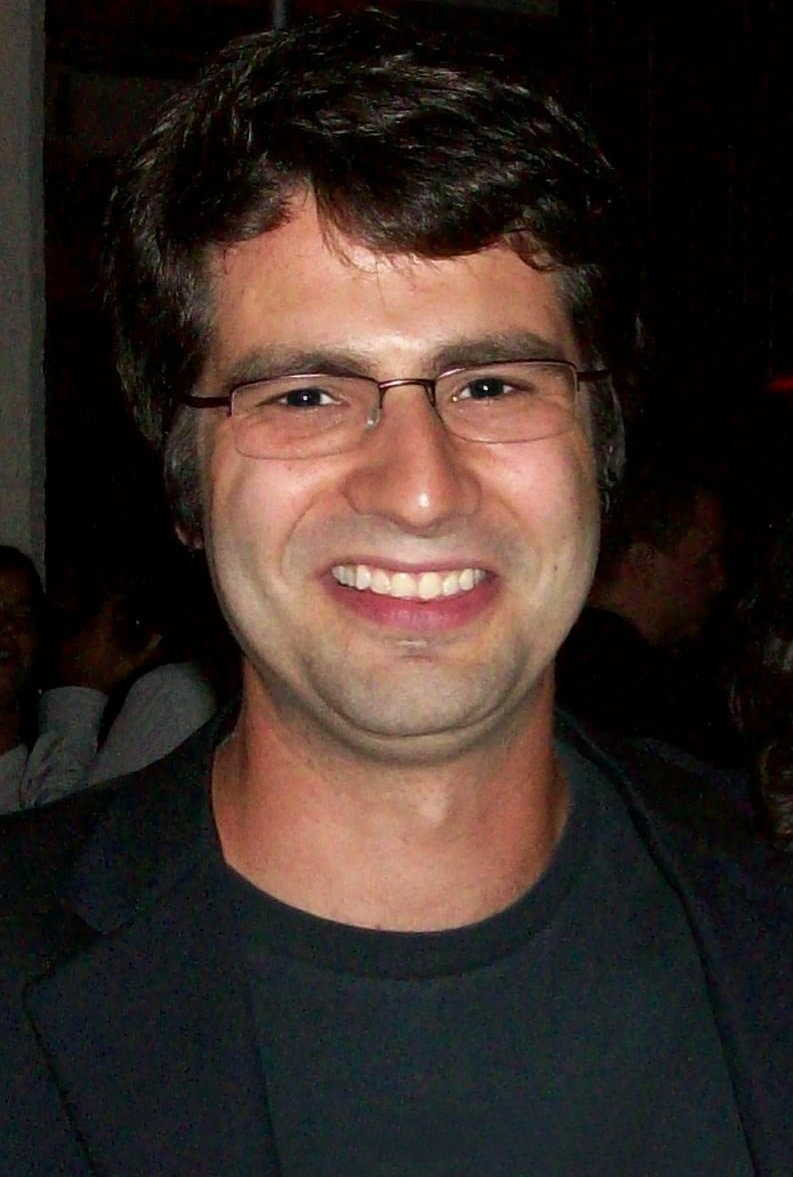
- Vizzini in 2010
- Born: Edison Price Vizzini; April 4, 1981; New York City, U.S.
- Died: December 19, 2013 (aged 32); New York City, U.S.
- Education: Stuyvesant High School
- Alma mater: Hunter College
- Occupation: Author
- Spouse: Sabra Embury
- Children: 1
- Writing career
- Period: 1996–2013
- Genre: Young adult fiction
- Notable works: Be More Chill; It's Kind of a Funny Story; House of Secrets

Edison Price Vizzini (April 4, 1981 – December 19, 2013) was an American writer. He was the author of four books for young adults, including It's Kind of a Funny Story (2006), which NPR placed at #56 in its list of the "100 Best-Ever Teen Novels" and which is the basis of the film of the same name.

Vizzini had depression, spending time in a psychiatric ward in his early 20s, and authoring several works about the illness. He was found dead in his native Brooklyn, New York after an apparent suicide from a fall, aged 32.

== Early life ==
Vizzini grew up in the Park Slope neighborhood of Brooklyn in New York City. He attended Stuyvesant High School in Manhattan, graduating in 1999. He also attended Hunter College. Vizzini's characters and situations are said to be based upon his time spent at Stuyvesant.

== Career ==
Vizzini's first published work was an essay he submitted to the New York Press, an alternative newspaper, about winning honorable mention at the 1996 Scholastic Art & Writing Awards. As a freelance writer for the paper, he wrote about everything from family vacations to getting drunk in the street with other kids. The success of Vizzini's work earned him an invitation to contribute a teen-focused article to the New York Times Magazine.

In May 1998, Vizzini's essay "Teen Angst? Nah!" appeared in The New York Times. Following this, several of his New York Press columns became the core of his first book, Teen Angst? Naaah.... which is a memoir of his teenage years. It is a collection of short stories, most of which were originally published in The New York Press and The New York Times Magazine. The book is broken down by years covering junior high through high school and beyond.

In 2004, his first novel, Be More Chill, was published. A review in the New York Times Book Review said that Be More Chill, which is about a high school student named Jeremy Heere who gets a supercomputer pill in his brain that makes him cool, "is so accurate that it should come with a warning," adding that "If it weren't so funny, [Vizzini's] first novel might be too painful to read."

Be More Chill was later adapted into a musical in summer 2015, with music and lyrics by Joe Iconis. It premiered at New Jersey's Two River Theatre. Three years later, an Off-Broadway production opened at the Signature Theater in New York, transferring to Broadway the following February.

In 2006, Vizzini's second novel, It's Kind of a Funny Story, was published. It is based on his five-day stay in Brooklyn's Methodist Hospital psychiatric ward. The book recounts fifteen-year-old Craig Gilner's battle with suicidal depression as a result of a taxing school year at Manhattan's Executive Pre-Professional High School that exacerbates his feeling of social inadequacy. A Los Angeles Times review called the novel "impressive," noting that "Vizzini’s sense of pacing, structure and character is solid, and his casual vernacular is dead-on, simultaneously capturing the paranoia and self-obsessed negativity of depression as well as the sexual curiosity of adolescence."

In 2012, Vizzini's third novel The Other Normals was published. It is an "alternative fantasy" about a teenager who falls into a fantasy world that is the basis of his favorite role-playing game. A review in The Austin American-Statesman said, "The sharp wit from author Ned Vizzini’s earlier works ... is on display here as well." With Nick Antosca, Vizzini wrote two episodes of the 2012 season of MTV's supernatural drama Teen Wolf.

In 2013, House of Secrets, the first novel in a middle grade fantasy series by Vizzini and filmmaker Chris Columbus, was published. It debuted on the New York Times bestseller list, where it remained for four weeks. Entertainment Weekly gave the book an "A−" review.

His essays and criticism appeared in The New York Times, the Los Angeles Review of Books, and Salon. He also had two short stories published by Underground Voices

Vizzini spoke at schools and libraries around the world about mental health, writing, and how students can use writing as a medicine for mental health. He spoke at UCLA; The Dalton School; the Brooklyn, New York, and Chicago Public Libraries; Murray State University; NYU; The National Council of Teachers of English; and a Master's Tea at Yale.

Vizzini and Antosca were story editors on ABC's 2013 drama series Last Resort. They are the credited writers of the episode "Nuke It Out."

From 2006 to 2012, Vizzini facilitated a writing workshop for local teenagers. The workshops were held monthly in a Park Slope Barnes & Noble. The teens who attended had the chance to have their work published on the group's blog, "Give Us Money."

== Death ==
Vizzini, who often spoke and wrote about his struggles with severe clinical depression, died by suicide on December 19, 2013, in Brooklyn, New York, at the age of 32. The New York City chief medical examiner's office said he suffered blunt impact injuries. The writer's brother, Daniel, told reporters that Vizzini had jumped off the roof of the building where their parents lived.

== Bibliography ==
- Teen Angst? Naaah... (2000)
- Be More Chill (2004)
- It's Kind of a Funny Story (2006)
- The Other Normals (2012)
- House of Secrets (2013)
- House of Secrets: Battle of the Beasts (2014)
