= Hazbin Hotel: Season Two (soundtrack) =

2025 soundtrack album

Hazbin Hotel: Season Two (Original Soundtrack)

Soundtrack album by cast of Hazbin Hotel
- Released: November 19, 2025
- Length: 45:42
- Label: Atlantic
- Producers: Andrew Underberg; Sam Haft

Cast of Hazbin Hotel chronology
Hazbin Hotel (Original Soundtrack) (2024)	Hazbin Hotel: Season Two (Original Soundtrack) (2025)

Singles from Hazbin Hotel: Season Two (Original Soundtrack)
- 1. "Hazbin Guarantee (Trust Us)" Released: October 1, 2025; 2. "Gravity" Released: October 10, 2025

Professional ratings
Review scores
Source	Rating
AllMusic	3.5/5 stars

Hazbin Hotel: Season Two (Original Soundtrack) is the soundtrack album for the second season of the American adult animated musical comedy television series Hazbin Hotel. The album was released on November 19, 2025, coinciding with the conclusion of the season. The album was preceded by the singles "Hazbin Guarantee (Trust Us)" and "Gravity", while other tracks became available following the release of each episode.

== Background ==
The soundtrack was first teased in October 2025 and was preceded by the singles "Hazbin Guarantee (Trust Us)" and "Gravity". Starting with the release of the first two episodes of the season on October 29, tracks from each week's episodes were made available on streaming services. These tracks were made available as part of the full album, and tracks from the first three batches of episodes were also made available as EPs on Spotify and Tidal. Prior to their release, upcoming tracks' titles were substituted with emojis on digital platforms to hint at which characters performed each song.

== Commercial performance ==
In the United States, the soundtrack debuted at number 70 on the Billboard 200 during the week dated November 20, 2025, after two days of tracking activity, earning 13,000 units. Following its first full week of tracking, it rose to number 8, earning 46,000 units, of which 13,500 were pure sales. The soundtrack surpassed the season one soundtrack, which had peaked at number 13.

== Track listing ==
All tracks are written by Andrew Underberg and Sam Haft.

Hazbin Hotel: Season Two (Original Soundtrack) track listing
No.	Title	Performer(s)	Length
1.	"Hazbin Guarantee (Trust Us)"	Erika Henningsen; Christian Borle; Joel Perez; Lilli Cooper; Stephanie Beatriz; Kevin Del Aguila; Krystina Alabado; Keith David; Kimiko Glenn; Amir Talai	3:25
2.	"Once We Get Up There"	Borle; Perez; Cooper	1:59
3.	"Like You"	Shoba Narayan; Patrick Stump; Darren Criss; Alex Brightman	1:59
4.	"Sera's Confession"	Patina Miller; Liz Callaway	2:00
5.	"Gravity"	Jessica Vosk; Brightman; Haft	1:53
6.	"Piss (A Love Song)"	Brightman; Alabado; Blake Roman	2:29
7.	"Speedrun to Redemption"	Henningsen; Roman; Borle; Cooper; Del Aguila	1:28
8.	"Don't You Forget"	Leslie Kritzer; Talai	1:37
9.	"Clean It Up!"	Glenn; Henningsen	1:07
10.	"Don't You Forget (Reprise)"	Borle; Talai; Perez	1:47
11.	"Bad with Us"	Borle; Alex Newell; James Monroe Iglehart; Andrew Durand; Stump; Cooper; Perez; Daphne Rubin-Vega	1:52
12.	"Vox Populi"	Jeremy Jordan; Borle	3:45
13.	"Vox Dei"	Borle	1:13
14.	"Love in a Bottle"	David; Cooper; Glenn; Alabado	2:04
15.	"Losin' Streak"	Roman	1:49
16.	"Easy"	Beatriz; Henningsen	1:45
17.	"Brighter"	Borle	2:38
18.	"Live to Live"	Brightman; Miller	2:11
19.	"When I Think About the Future"	Henningsen; Beatriz; Alabado; David; Del Aguila; Glenn; Narayan; Borle; Talai; Perez; Cooper; Jordan; Vosk; Stump; Miller	3:22
20.	"Hear My Hope"	Narayan; Henningsen; David; Glenn; Beatriz; Roman; Del Aguila; Alabado; Vosk; Stump; Brightman; Rubin-Vega; Iglehart; Durand; Kritzer; Talai; Newell; Perez; Cooper; Borle	5:09
Total length:			45:42

Bonus Demo Edition track listing
No.	Title	Performer(s)	Length
21.	"Piss (Original Power Ballad Demo)"	Sam Haft	2:32
22.	"Brighter (Original 80s Demo)"	Haft	2:19
23.	"Losin' Streak (Original R&B Demo)"	Haft	1:35
24.	"Our Girl, Charlie (Season 1 Recap)"	Talai	2:48
Total length:			54:26

Bonus Edition track listing
No.	Title	Performer(s)	Length
21.	"VOX POPULI (but its just the MotherF****** King of Hell)"	Jordan	0:56
22.	"Hear My Hope (Abel's Breakdown)"	Stump	0:58
Total length:			47:38

Notes:

- "Vox Populi" and "Vox Dei" are stylized in all uppercase.
- Spotify and Tidal additionally placed the pre-release tracks into separate EPs corresponding with their respective episodes; other platforms only made the tracks available as part of the full album. The EPs consist of the following:
  - Episodes 1–2: Tracks 1–5
  - Episodes 3–4: Tracks 6–10
  - Episodes 5–6: Tracks 11–16

== Accolades ==
Year	Award	Category	Result	Ref.
2026	American Music Awards	Best Soundtrack	Nominated	

== Charts ==
Chart performance for Hazbin Hotel: Season Two (Original Soundtrack)
Chart (2025–2026)	Peak position
Australian Albums (ARIA)	61
Austrian Albums (Ö3 Austria)	27
Belgian Albums (Ultratop Flanders)	33
Belgian Albums (Ultratop Wallonia)	81
Canadian Albums (Billboard)	7
Danish Albums (Hitlisten)	28
Dutch Albums (Album Top 100)	20
French Albums (SNEP)	177
German Albums (Offizielle Top 100)	70
Hungarian Albums (MAHASZ)	5
Icelandic Albums (Tónlistinn)	30
Irish Compilation Albums (IRMA)	2
Japanese Digital Albums (Oricon)	6
Japanese Hot Albums (Billboard Japan)	29
Lithuanian Albums (AGATA)	94
New Zealand Albums (RMNZ)	11
Polish Albums (ZPAV)	65
Portuguese Albums (AFP)	85
Spanish Albums (Promusicae)	84
Swiss Albums (Schweizer Hitparade)	45
UK Compilation Albums (Official Charts)	2
UK Album Downloads (Official Charts)	3
UK Soundtrack Albums (Official Charts)	3
UK Vinyl Albums (OCC)	31
US Billboard 200	8
US Comedy Albums (Billboard)	1
US Soundtrack Albums (Billboard)	2

Chart performance for Hazbin Hotel: Season Two (Episodes 5–6) (Original Soundtrack)
Chart (2025)	Peak position
French Albums (SNEP)	175
Lithuanian Albums (AGATA)	32
Norwegian Albums (IFPI Norge)	20
Polish Albums (ZPAV)	38

== Release history ==
Release dates and formats for Hazbin Hotel: Season Two (Original Soundtrack)
Region	Date	Format	Version	Label	Ref.
Various	October 29, 2025	Streaming	Episodes 1–2 EP	Atlantic	
Various	November 5, 2025	Streaming	Episodes 3–4 EP	Atlantic	
Various	November 12, 2025	Streaming	Episodes 5–6 EP	Atlantic	
Various	November 19, 2025	Digital download; streaming	Full soundtrack	Atlantic	
Various	November 21, 2025	CD; vinyl; cassette	Full soundtrack	Atlantic	
Various	November 24, 2025	Digital download; streaming	Bonus Demo Edition	Atlantic	
Various	December 12, 2025	Digital download; streaming	Bonus Edition	Atlantic	
