= Gravity (Hazbin Hotel song) =

2025 Hazbin Hotel song

Single by Jessica Vosk, Alex Brightman, Sam Haft and Andrew Underberg

from the album Hazbin Hotel: Season Two (Original Soundtrack)
- Released: October 10, 2025
- Genre: Punk rock
- Length: 1:53
- Label: Atlantic
- Songwriters: Sam Haft; Andrew Underberg
- Producers: Haft; Underberg; Julien Nguyen

Cast of Hazbin Hotel singles chronology
"Hazbin Guarantee (Trust Us)" (2025)	"Gravity" (2025)

The YouTube video thumbnail for the song, featuring the characters Adam (left) and Lute (right), on Prime Video's channel.

"Gravity" is a song from the adult animated musical comedy television series Hazbin Hotel. It is sung by Jessica Vosk (playing the character Lute) and Alex Brightman (playing Adam), with additional vocals by Sam Haft. It was written by Haft and Andrew Underberg.

It was released on October 10, 2025, as the second preceding single for the soundtrack to season two of Hazbin Hotel, and is featured in "Storyteller", the second episode of the show's second season.

== Background ==
For the second season of Hazbin Hotel, Sam Haft and Andrew Underberg planned to write a "villain song" for Jessica Vosk, actor of Lute. Vosk did not sing much in season one, but her performance in the song "You Didn't Know" was well received by fans, leading to the addition of a solo song for her in the second season.

Haft and Underberg found it compelling to compose music that solely reflected the bloodthirsty, menacing nature of the character Lute, in contrast to the "theatrical rock music" sung by Alex Brightman's character, Adam. At the request of series creator Vivienne "VivziePop" Medrano, they used Latin choir chants as backing vocals (similar in manner to Gregorian chants), which were inspired by the song "Hellfire" from the 1996 Disney film The Hunchback of Notre Dame. The song premiered at the 2025 New York Comic Con.

== Composition and lyrics ==
"Gravity" is a punk rock song, composed of "contemporary-rock" elements and Latin chants. It employs hip-hop vocal rhythm in some verses.

It is performed by Jessica Vosk as Lute, with backing vocals from Alex Brightman as Lute's hallucination of Adam and Sam Haft as the Latin chants. Lute expresses a desire for vengeance against Charlie Morningstar for Adam's death in the previous season, and suggests she plans to kill Charlie's girlfriend, Vaggie, so that Charlie understands the feeling of losing a loved one too.

== Charts ==
Chart performance
Chart (2025)	Peak position
Canada (Canadian Hot 100)	80
Ireland (IRMA)	82
New Zealand Hot Singles (RMNZ)	4
UK Singles (Official Charts)	53
U.S. Bubbling Under Hot 100 (Billboard)	4
U.S. Hot Rock & Alternative Songs (Billboard)	11

== Release history ==
Release dates and formats for "Gravity"
Region	Date	Format	Label	Ref.
Various	October 10, 2025	Digital download; streaming	Atlantic	
Italy	October 17, 2025	Radio airplay	Warner	
