= Vosk =

Vosk may refer to:

- Jessica Vosk, American singer and actress
- Vosk, river in the fictional world of Gor
- Vosk (Star Trek), Star Trek character
