= List of Beetlejuice characters =

The following is a list of characters who have appeared throughout Beetlejuice film series, the animated series, and the Broadway musical.

== Main characters ==
=== Beetlejuice ===
Beetlejuice (also spelled Betelgeuse) (Michael Keaton in the films, Stephen Ouimette in the animated series, Alex Brightman in the Broadway musical and the Teen Titans Go! episode "Ghost With the Most", and Justin Collette in the US tour of the musical) is a mischievous ghost. He is the main antagonist of the movies and the main protagonist of the animated TV series.

Beetlejuice's first appearance in the first film shows him reading a newspaper page welcoming Adam and Barbara Maitland to the afterlife, called the Netherworld, after their deaths. He comments they look nice and stupid, and begins using advertisements (flyers, business cards, and a commercial) to get the Maitlands to hire him as a "bio-exorcist" to get rid of the Deetz family, the new occupants of their home. However, Juno, the Maitlands' case worker, advises them to avoid him. Beetlejuice appears within Adam's model town in the attic and instructs the Maitlands to say his name three times, which they do, summoning them into the model. Beetlejuice harasses them and makes perverted comments towards Barbara and gross displays of his ghostly body. He then leaves the model and begins attacking the Deetz's, turning into a large snake to scare them. The Maitlands decide that his behavior is too extreme and say his name three times to stop him.

Later, Beetlejuice comes across Lydia when she enters the Maitlands' attic and finds the model town. She confesses to him that she is suicidal and wants to cross into the Netherworld like Adam and Barbara. Beetlejuice tells her that she can do so if she says his name three times, which she nearly does before being stopped by the Maitlands. When the Deetzs hold séance that begins to exorcise the Maitlands, Beetlejuice tells Lydia that he'll save them if she agrees to marry him, which, seeing no other option, she accepts. The marriage is only stopped last second by the Maitlands, and Beeltejuice is swallowed by a sandworm.

In the animated series, Beetlejuice's creepy, womanizing nature is toned down for a younger audience. He is best friends with Lydia, who he takes on adventures in the Netherworld. Unlike his movie counterpart, his powers seem to be limited to wordplay, needing a timely gag or pun to transform (e.g., he says something "bugs" him, he'll turn into an insect).

In the Broadway musical, Beetlejuice, unlike previous incarnations of the character, is a self-proclaimed demon from Hell and fully aware he is in a musical. He frequently breaks the 4th wall and occasionally narrates the story. The musical blends aspects of the movie and animated series, turning Beetlejuice into a more likeable protagonist and showing a friendship with Lydia, although he still deceives her and attempts to marry her.

In the second film, set 36 years after the first film, Beetlejuice first appears at Lydia's supernatural show Ghost House between the crowd. He then appears at Astrid's school only to disappear when Astrid and Delia turn around. Lydia thinks these are just hallucinations due to her past trauma but it turns out Beetlejuice has a psychic connection to Lydia and this allows him to actually show up in the land of the living, albeit this seems to be limited. In his office, where he expanded his business of bio-exorcism, he keeps a picture of Lydia as a teenager and stares at it as he spies on her. He is called by the afterlife detective Wolf Jackson that reveals to him that his ex-wife, Delores is back for revenge. Beetlejuice hides in his office and plans to have Bob disguised as himself to be bait for Delores. After finding out the Deetz family is coming back to Winter River for Charles's funeral after the latter's death, Beetlejuice decides to take the occasion to convince Lydia into marrying him again so he can be alive again and escape from Delores forever. Beetlejuice once again uses flyers and promos to gain Lydia's attention. When Lydia's sly boyfriend Rory thinks he is just a figment of Lydia's imagination, he says his name 3 times and it results in them being transported in the model, where Beetlejuice, disguised as a couple therapist, makes Lydia give ‘birth’ to a creepy Baby Beetlejuice and scares Rory into fainting after he said he was just a figment of his imagination. Lydia scolds him for stalking her, but he admits he wants to remarry her because she is the love of his life. However, Lydia says home 3 times bringing her and Rory out of the model but Beetlejuice appears to her, playing a guitar and singing Right Here Waiting for You, declaring his love for her. Later, after Astrid gets manipulated by Jeremy to swap souls, Lydia reluctantly summons Beetlejuice and asks him to help her save her daughter before she gets taken to the Soul Train, which would bring her to the Great Beyond forever. Beetlejuice agrees to help, but in return he wants her marry him. Lydia agrees but Beetlejuice makes sure this time she keeps her word by making her sign a contract and promising to make her happy with him. As they cannot enter the usual way, he draws a bomb with chalk on the wall and lights it up, causing an explosion into his office. Because of the explosion Beetlejuice sets off the Code 699 alarm and security start looking for him and Lydia. Beetlejuice tells Bob to block the entrance but instead he lets the shrunken heads escape into the world of the living. Beetlejuice and Lydia go towards the door leading to the Soul Train station but he senses Delores is nearby so he tells her where to go and they split up. Delia, after realizing she is dead and reluctantly summons Beetlejuice to help her find her husband Charles. He agrees if she will help him find Lydia. As Jeremy is about to get his passport stamped to re-enter the living world, Beetlejuice is revealed to be the immigration officer and rejects his passport, sending Jeremy to Hell thus killing him again and giving Astrid her soul back. Helped by Delia, Beetlejuice crashes the pending wedding of Lydia and Rory. He warns Astrid to refrain from saying his name via his agreement with Lydia and asks Astrid to call him ‘Dad’. He then injects Rory with truth serum to admit he never loved Lydia and is only after her money, angering her and Beetlejuice provides her some of his powers to let her punch him. He kills the social media influencers Rory invited, changes himself and Lydia into their original wedding attire, and begins a musical wedding ceremony. The wedding is interrupted by Wolf whom he freezes to avoid arrest, and then Delores who, along with Rory, is eaten by a Sandworm. Astrid says the contract is null and void due to him illegally bringing Lydia into the afterlife by setting off the 699 alarm and turning the shrunken heads lose in the land of the living. Beetlejuice is left disappointed when Lydia summons him back to the afterlife.

=== Lydia Deetz ===
Lydia Deetz (Winona Ryder in the films, Alyson Court in the animated series, Sophia Anne Caruso in the Broadway musical, (Note: Caruso was replaced by Elizabeth Teeter when the show reopened in 2022.) and Isabella Esler in the US tour of the musical) is the daughter of Charles Deetz and the stepdaughter of Delia Deetz.

In the first film, Lydia is a 15-year-old goth girl who moves to Winter River, Connecticut from New York City with her family. Lydia takes a liking to their new house and disapproves of her eccentric stepmother's extreme home renovations. She finds the Handbook for the Recently Deceased in the attic and is able to understand it. Lydia is also able to discover the Maitlands as, in her words, she is also "strange and unusual". Sympathizing with the Maitlands' plight and mission to scare the Deetzs from their home, Lydia helps them attack her parents' dinner party. The guests, however, become excited at the prospect of using the house as an attraction, and the Maitlands summon Beetlejuice to scare them. Lydia, who has also been scared by the display, accuses the Maitlands of deceiving her. Later, when attempting to leave a suicide note in the Maitlands' attic, she comes across Beetlejuice in Adam's model town and is nearly convinced to summon him before Adam and Barbara stop her. Delia's friend Otho finds the Handbook and uses it for a séance, successfully re-animating the Maitlands to exorcise them, causing their bodies to decay. Seeing no other option, Lydia summons Beetlejuice, who says he will help them if she marries him. Lydia agrees and Beetlejuice forces her through a ghostly marriage ceremony, which is only stopped at the last moment when Barbara manipulates a sandworm to kill him. In the end of the film, Lydia is shown to have adjusted well, earning good grades in her new school and sharing her family's home with the Maitlands.

In the animated series, Lydia lives in the fictional New England town of Peaceful Pines with her parents and black cat, Percy. She attends Miss Shannon's School for Girls, where she is friends with two classmates named Bertha and Prudence, and rivals with a rich girl, Claire Brewster. Like in the film, Lydia is different from her peers because of her gothic interests and style and describes herself as "strange and unusual". She is best friends with Beetlejuice, whose creepy and womanizing personality is toned down for a younger audience. Together, the two go on adventures in the real world and the Netherworld.

In the Broadway musical, Lydia, her father, and her life coach, Delia, move to Winter River, Connecticut after the death of Lydia's mother. Akin to the series, Beetlejuice strikes a friendship with Lydia, and she is initially delighted when he is summoned during her father's dinner party. However, Beetlejuice tricks her into exorcising the Maitlands, and she must agree to marry him to save them. She does, and escapes into the Netherworld with them, where a deceased ensemble teaches her to enjoy living. When she returns to her home, she agrees to go through with the wedding ceremony. Beetlejuice is resurrected through the marriage and Lydia stabs him to kill him again, making him "recently deceased".

In the second film, set 36 years after the first, Lydia had found a loophole that allowed the Maitlands to leave their house and move on to the afterlife. She went on to marry and have a daughter, Astrid, but was widowed and estranged from her daughter after the incident. She became famous from starring in her own TV show, Ghost House with Lydia Deetz, and began dating a man named Rory. After her father dies, she reconnects with Delia and Astrid, and Rory surprises her by proposing at his wake, which she is manipulated into accepting. As it becomes increasingly obvious to her that Beetlejuice is back and attempting to get her attention, she tells Rory about her experiences. He assumes Beetlejuice is only a figment of her imagination and summons him. The two manifest in the model town and are harassed by Beetlejuice, who tells Lydia that he loves her and wants to remarry her, before they are able to leave the model. After learning that Astrid has been tricked into entering the Netherworld, Lydia reluctantly summons Beetlejuice for help, who says he will if she marries him. She agrees and is brought to the Netherworld. Separated from Beetlejuice, she finds Astrid and her ex-husband, Richard, and the three reconcile. When Lydia and Astrid arrive back in the real world, Beetlejuice reveals to Delia and Rory that she'd agreed to marry him. He forces Rory to admit that he never loved Lydia and was only after her money, and she punches him. Beetlejuice attempts a new marriage ceremony between himself and Lydia, but Astrid figures out that since he'd illegally brought Lydia to the afterlife, their agreement is null. Lydia banishes him to the afterlife before deciding to quit her show to spend time traveling with Astrid.

=== Delia Deetz ===
Delia Deetz (known as Delia Schlimmer in the Broadway musical) (Catherine O'Hara in the films, Elizabeth Hanna in the animated series, Leslie Kritzer in the Broadway musical, and Kate Marilley in the US tour of the musical) (Note: Marilley was later replaced by Sarah Litzsinger.) is the wife of Charles Deetz and stepmother of Lydia Deetz.

In the first film, sometime after his first marriage ended in divorce, Charles married Delia, a struggling artist specializing in gothic style. While she and Charles would have an ambiguous marriage, she did not get along with her stepdaughter Lydia. Charles secretly purchases Adam and Barbara Maitland's residence after their deaths as an escape from life in New York, forcing the family to move from New York to Connecticut. Delia immediately hates the house and makes it a goal to remodel it to her taste, much to the horror of the Maitlands who are haunting the house. In a span of 3 months, she transforms the house into one of goth style and full of her artwork. The Maitlands try to scare the family out but Delia and Charles can not see them, though Lydia quickly finds out about them and agrees to help. Delia dismisses Lydia's photos of the ghosts as fake and is more focused on impressing her dinner guests. During the dinner, she gets annoyed when Lydia brings up the ghosts again until the Maitlands possesses the adults into singing and dancing to Day-O. This excites Delia and Charles who sees this as a way to gain fame and wealth via using the house as a haunted amusement park. However the Maitlands refuse to show themselves from the attic where they've been hiding. Beetlejuice then manifests into a snake to terrorize the family before being summoned away by the Maitlands. Otho convinces Charles and Delia to gather their guests once more for a séance to force the ghosts to appear. The Maitlands do appear but Otho has unintentionally performed an exorcism, causing them to decay and ‘die’, much to Delia's horror. Lydia summons Beetlejuice to save the Maitlands and, after doing to, greets Charles and Delia as Lydia had agreed to marry him in exchange for his help. With them as witnesses to the ceremony, he traps them with Delia's artwork. However they are freed when the Maitlands interfere and send him back to the afterlife. Delia and Charles then finally meet the Maitlands. Some months pass, during which the adults co exist in the house.

In the animated series, ike in the films, Delia is an eccentric sculptor and an artist. A running gag inspired by a joke in the movie has her show Charles Deetz a sculpture or other work of art she made and assumes he likes it after the work of art scares him. She also acts a lot like a stereotypical sweet, but overprotective mother, and wants her daughter to abandon her interests in scary, other-worldly things and focus on more "normal" things for a girl her age. She is also very sensitive, as shown when she adopted Beetlejuice (who at the time was stuck in the form of a dog whose name was Odeious) and was heartbroken when he ran away. Despite somewhat physically resembling Wilma Flintstone from The Flintstones, some of Delia's habits, such as her red hair, poor cooking skills and self-absorbed Yuppie personality, resemblance that of Married... with Children matriarch Peg Bundy. Oddly, Delia also seems to enjoy the Neitherworld. When the Deetzes travel there, she always has a good time. Notably, her bizarre art is also very popular among the ghosts of Neitherwords. The Monster across the street buys one of her sculptures, and she puts on an award-winning show at a Neitherworld museum.

In the Broadway musical, although her history in the musical compared to the films is mostly unknown, it was confirmed that Delia got a divorce with her ex-husband after cheating on her with another man and sailing away to Rome, Italy. After changing her last name to her maiden name, Schlimmer, she started dating widower Charles Deetz most likely after the funeral of Emily Deetz. Before this, she met her guru Otho Fenlock, most likely becoming a life-coach and a vegan shortly after.

In the second film, over the next 36 years since the first, Delia becomes famous as she continues her artwork; opening an art studio in New York and donating funds and art to schools. She informs Lydia of her father, Charles', death and spends majority of her time in the film in mourning. She continues her eccentric work, such as taking photo selfies of her screaming to portray the art of grief and covering the entire house in black cloth. She also makes preparations to sell the house, much to Astrid's dismay. When Rory proposes to Lydia at Charles' wake, she is very disappointed and against the wedding, as she senses Rory has no good intentions. Lydia confides in her ‘hallucinations’ of Beetlejuice and Delia tells her to take back control of her life. On Halloween, she meets with the real estate agent to sign papers to begin the selling of the house. She then goes to the cemetery to record another video next to her late husband's grave, using asps that were supposedly designed to remove fangs and toxins. However, they bit her in the carotid artery, killing her instantly. She then wakes up in the waiting room of the afterlife and is horrified to realize she is dead. The lady giving out the numbers brushes off her outbursts and Delia reluctantly summons Beetlejuice. She asks him to help her find Charles and he agrees if she helps him find Lydia. She and Beetlejuice appear at the church where Lydia and Rory's wedding was supposed to take place. Beetlejuice reveals the deal Lydia made with him to help save Astrid, in which Lydia agreed to marry him, much to Delia's disgust. Beetlejuice then takes Rory's place as the groom, and forced Delia, Astrid, Rory and the priest to sing and dance as he prepares to wed Lydia. However Astrid points out the marriage contract her mother signed is null and void due to him illegally bringing Lydia into the afterlife, allowing Lydia to send him back to the afterlife. Delia is taken by Wolf Jackson back to the afterlife where she reunites with Charles at the Soul Train station.

=== Charles Deetz ===
Charles Deetz (Jeffrey Jones in the first film, Charlie Hopkinson and Mark Heenhan in the second film, Roger Dunn in the animated series, Adam Dannheisser in the Broadway musical, and Jesse Sharp in the US tour of the musical) is the husband of Delia Deetz and the father of Lydia Deetz.

In the first film, Charles used to work in real estate in New York City before his nervous breakdown, which is why he and his family moved to "the sticks" in the first place. According to Lydia, Charles was married to Lydia's mother before he met Delia, though what happened to his first wife remains a mystery. Although Charles claims he just wants to relax and clip coupons (which he obviously does), he wants to his real estate career and begins plans to sell the entire town of Winter River, Connecticut. Though Charles acts too busy for his own family, he truly cares about them. He loves his wife, Delia (despite hating the way she "trashes the place" with her redecorating obsession), and is attentive to Lydia (even asking her opinion of the new house, promising her a darkroom for her photography and calls her "pumpkin"). While initially upset at the idea when Adam and Barbara Maitland summoned the snake (Beetlejuice in disguise) to attack him, Charles shows great concern when the séance-turned-exorcism causes the couple to decompose in front of him and tries to make Otho stop. Beetlejuice then appears and restrains Charles along with his wife, who are forced to watch Lydia being forcibly married to Beetlejuice. However, this is stopped by Barbara and Adam, who use a sandworm to send Beetlejuice back to the afterlife. Charles looks gratefully at the Maitlands for saving his daughter. In the end, Charles seems to accept the idea of living with ghosts, reading the book called The Living and the Dead and shares Adam's frustration that the book reads like stereo instructions. While Beetlejuice has been banished, Charles still has a lingering fear of him which is triggered when Delia shows him a sculpture of Beetlejuice in Snake form.

In the second film, set 36 years later, after summoning Lydia to her art exhibit, Delia breaks the news to her that Charles has passed on. He was on a vacation period to a bird watching trip. Lydia sent him some equipment as a gift which he was grateful for, and the trip itself went very well, but on his flight back, the Pacific Travel Airlines plane lost the left wing and fell from the sky, crashing into the ocean below and breaking in half in the process. Charles survived the crash, and attempted to float to safety alongside the other survivors who were standing on the remains of the back half of the plane, but as he swam toward them using the lost wing of the plane as a raft, an extremely large shark breached the surface of the ocean and ate the center of his torso out of his body, leaving his ghost to have no head or chest, but still have his legs, a stomach, shoulders and arms. He wandered the afterlife seemingly unaware of the fact that he did not make it, at least initially. He visited an afterlife dry cleaner asking where he was and complaining of feeling severely lightheaded. Briefly, a picture of Charles can be seen at his funeral. Eventually, following the death of Delia, he would have a short moment with his remaining family before departing on the soul train to the great beyond with his beloved wife, wishing his family well. In the second film, which was character's final appearance due to the various controversies surrounding his actor Jeffrey Jones, the actors who respectively portrayed and voiced Charles, Mark Heenhan and Charlie Hopkinson, were miscredited as "Clive" in the film's credits.

=== Little Jane Butterfield ===
Little Jane Butterfield (Rachel Mittleman in the first film, Amy Nuttall in the second film) is the daughter of realtor Jane Butterfield and the mother of Jane Butterfield III. In the second film, it is revealed that she got married and has a daughter who is named after her and her grandmother. Little Jane also has the same dress and the same hair as her mother.

=== Sandworms ===
Sandworms are worm-like aliens native to Titan who have a secondary head inside the mouth of the "outer skin". The second head seems to act as the sandworm's main head, with it being used to express and to eat. The second head appears to use the outer one as a shield from sand when going under, as well as a second pair of eyes. Sandworms have the ability to see the undead.

In the animated series, the Sandworms look very different, appearing to be much larger in size, having only one head instead of two, but still having four eyes, having yellow teeth instead of white teeth, having multiple medium-sized green fins on their backs instead of one large black fin and while their bodies and tongues still have the same striped pattern as in the movies, the colors are now shades of lavender instead of black and white.

== Beetlejuice ==
=== The Maitlands ===
==== Adam Maitland ====
Adam Maitland (Alec Baldwin in the film, Rob McClure in the Broadway musical, and Will Burton in the US tour of the musical) is the husband of Barbara Maitland. He owns and operates the Maitland Hardware Store in Winter River, Connecticut and he has no fear of spiders.

In the first film, Adam married Barbara and they moved into a large house in a small town called Winter River, Connecticut. Adam spends most of his time in the attic working on a giant model of the town. One morning, the couple was driving home from their hardware store when Barbara swerved to avoid hitting a dog, causing them to crash off a bridge and over into the water where they drowned. They both make it back home, unbeknownst to them that they are dead. Adam notices something is off, realizing he cannot recall getting out of the water, and heads back to the bridge to retrace his steps. But as soon as he steps off the porch, he finds himself in a sandy desert planet with a monster looming. Barbara pulls him back onto the porch before the monster can devour him and states he has been gone for two hours, and in the time that he was gone, she has noticed there reflections do not appear in the living room mirror. She also points out a handbook on the table with the title Handbook for the Recently Deceased, and they realize they did not survive the crash. Later, the couple are in their bedroom and Adam is sitting on the bed trying to read the handbook. Despite all the questions Barbara asks, Adam is unable to understand anything, stating it reads like stereo instructions. Adam spends the next few days working on his town model, while Barbara attempts to clean. When Barbara's cousin, Jane Butterfield, drives up to the house, Adam tries to get her attention, but Barbara points out that the handbook says the living cannot see the dead. Adam says that since they are dead, they should not have much to worry about. Some time later, Adam and Barbara wake up to a loud noise and notice a family has moved into their house: Charles Deetz, his wife Delia, and his daughter Lydia. Adam and Barbara attempt to scare them away by Adam cutting off his head to look like a headless corpse, but while Delia and her interior designer, Otho, are looking around the house, they cannot see them. Adam notices that they are headed to the attic, and Adam locks it quickly so they cannot get in. Adam returns to Barbara and puts his head back on. Barbara doesn't approve of the changes the Deetz family is making to the house and tries to leave. Adam follows her and they both end up on the desert planet as soon as they step off the porch. Adam frantically searches for Barbara and when he finds her, they are confronted by a giant sandworm. They retreat back into the house, realizing they are trapped. The Maitlands keep the attic locked and take refuge in it. When Adam is flipping through the handbook, a flyer falls out for Betelguese, the bio-exorcist, but no way to contact him. Barbara is looking out the window and sees Lydia noticing them, but Adam denies this. Lydia is given a skeleton key and tries to enter the attic, but Adam and Barbara hold the door. A commercial appears on the television for Betelguese, saying he can get rid of people living in his house. Adam realizes they need help, and returns to the handbook for emergencies. Following the instructions, he draws a door with chalk on the attic wall and knocks three times. The wall turns into a passageway and Adam and Barbara enter, giving Lydia a chance to unlock the attic door. They enter the Waiting Room and are told to go to the third door to their right after waiting for a while. They enter and are horrified to see it is their house remodeled in a gothic style. Juno meets with them and explains they are to haunt their house for 125 years and it is their responsibility to get the family out by themselves. Juno also warns them to never approach Beetlejuice because he is a troublemaker and he can be brought back by saying his name 3 times. The Maitlands dress up in bed sheets to try and scare Charles and Delia but this fails. Lydia snaps photographs of them and realizes they are ghosts. Adam is surprised Lydia can see them and can understand the handbook. In the attic, they bond with Lydia and they ask her to help them scare her parents, and she agrees. However, Delia brushes off Lydia. Adam and Barbara notice Beetlejuice lurking around the model cemetery and curiously summon him, ending up in the model. They dig up his grave and Beetlejuice emerges, immediately sexually harassing Barbara and teasing Adam. Both regret summoning him and decide back out of working with him, and resolve to scare the Deetz family out themselves. During dinner, Charles, Delia and their guests are possessed into singing and dancing to Day-O. Adam and Barbara think they succeeded but the others are excited and try to force their way into the attic, and fail to notice the couple hiding. Beetlejuice manifests into a snake to terrorize them before being stopped by Barbara and Lydia accuses them of being involved. Beetlejuice berates Adam and Barbara for breaking their deal while they scold him for hurting Charles and scaring Lydia. They are summoned to the Netherworld where Juno scolds them for letting Beetlejuice and letting Otho get the handbook. She advises them to come up with a new trick to scare the family and they distort their faces. However, Barbara has second thoughts because she is fond of Lydia and Adam sympathizes with her. They return home to find Lydia about to summon Beetlejuice and stop her, and they comfort Lydia as she admits she wants to be dead with them. Otho summons the Maitlands via a séance who immediately begin decaying, as rather than a séance, Otho had performed an exorcism. Lydia goes to Beetlejuice to ask him to save them and he agrees if she agrees to marry him so he can leave the afterlife for good. She agrees and summons him, and he keeps his end of the bargain and saves the Maitlands. As he tries to force Lydia to marry him, Adam and Barbara interfere and save Lydia. Months later, Adam and Barbara become secondary parents to Lydia, and peacefully co exist with the Deetz family.

In the second film, at some point during the 36 years between the first and second films, Lydia found a loophole that allowed Adam and Barbara to move on the Great Beyond.

==== Barbara Maitland ====
Barbara Maitland (Geena Davis in the film, Kerry Butler in the Broadway musical, and Britney Coleman in the US tour of the musical) (Note: Coleman was later replaced by Megan McGinnis.) is the wife of Adam Maitland and a ghost who haunts the home of the Deetzes.

In the first film, Barbara is married to Adam Maitland and they live in a big, nice house in Winter River, Connecticut. Her cousin, real estate agent Jane Butterfield, tries to force the couple to sell the house to a large family, as the couple is struggling with infertility. During their vacation time at home, they visit their hardware store and head back home but swerve to avoid hitting a dog. Causing their car to fall off the bridge and sink into the river, and they drown. They end up back home not remembering how. When Adam tries to leave and is gone for 2 hours due to having been teleported to one of Saturn's moons, Barbara finds the Handbook for the Recently Deceased and point to Adam their lack of reflection in the mirror, concluding they are dead. They find no answers from the handbook on what to do however. Soon after the Deetz family buys the house and begins renovating it to Delia's taste. The Maitlands try various ways to scare the family out of the house to no avail as the family cannot see them. In frustration, Barbara tries to leave but gets teleported to Saturn and is nearly attacked by a Sandworm before Adam saves her. They decide to hide away in the attic. Their daughter, Lydia, is able to see them from the attic window. They see a ‘bio-exorcist’ commercial of Beetlejuice offering to help rid the family but they are confused on why his flyers and cards have no address or phone number. They decide to seek help from the afterlife and, following instructions from the handbook, draw a door and knock three times. They enter the waiting room to be seen by their case worker Juno. They are told to go through the third door and find it is their house having been completely renovated. They meet Juno who tells them they are to haunt their house for 125 years before crossing over. She also warns them to never reach out to Beetlejuice because of his dangerous antics and he can be summoned by calling his name 3 times. The Maitlands then dress themselves up in sheets to scare Charles and Delia to no avail. Lydia photographs them and realizes they are ghosts. They befriend one another and the Maitlands ask for her to help them scare her parents out of the house, and she agrees to help them. They later realize Beetlejuice is lurking inside Adam's model and curiously summon him, ending up in the model. They dig up his grave and Beetlejuice emerges, and immediately sexually harasses Barbara. They are troubled by him and Barbara says home 3 times which gets them out of the model. They decide to not work for Beetlejuice and scare the family out themselves. They use their new powers to possess Charles, Delia and their dinner guests into singing and dancing to Day-O, but this excites them rather than scare them. When Beetlejuice manifests into a snake to terrorize the family, Lydia accuses the Maitlands of being part of it. Barbara then scolds Beetlejuice for his actions and warns him to stay away from Lydia. She is then disgusted when Beetlejuice goes to a brothel. The Maitlands are summoned to the Netherworld and scolded by Juno for summoning Beetlejuice and letting Otho get the handbook. She tells them to come up with a new trick to scare the family and they distort their faces. However, Barbara has second thoughts because of her fondness for Lydia. They stop Lydia from summoning Beetlejuice. They comfort the girl when she admits she wants to be dead with them and they tell her being dead does not make things better. Otho uses the handbook to summon the Maitlands, who immediately begin decaying, as rather than a séance, he had performed an exorcism. Lydia goes to Beetlejuice to ask him to save them and he agrees if she agrees to marry him so he can escape the Netherworld. She agrees and Beetlejuice keeps his end of the bargain and saves the couple. Just he tries to force Lydia to marry him, the Maitlands interfere. Barbara is sent to Saturn's moon but she gets a Sandworm to enter the living world and devour Beetlejuice, saving Lydia from the forced marriage. Months later, Barbara and Adam become secondary parents to Lydia, and peacefully co exist with the Deetz family.

In the second film, at some point between the first and second films, Lydia found a loophole in the Maitlands' 125-year sentence to haunt their house, allowing the couple to move on to the Great Beyond.

=== Juno ===
Juno (known as Mrs. Shoggoth in the Broadway musical) (Sylvia Sidney in the film, Jill Abramovitz in the Broadway musical, and Karmine Alers in the US tour of the musical) is an afterlife case worker.

In the first film, she is an afterlife caseworker whom the Adam and Barbara Maitland go to for help in dealing with the afterlife and for assistance removing the Deetz's from their home. She had Beetlejuice as an assistant at one time until he decided to go "out on his own" as a "Freelance Bio-Exorcist" who claimed he could "get rid of the living". She warns the Maitlands not to summon Beetlejuice, but to scare the Deetzes out of their house themselves, because Betelgeuse "does not work well with others". She now uses the receptionist, Miss Argentina, as a new assistant. She was seen much later in the film, when she was dealing with the deaths of the football players. She scolds the Maitlands for leaving the Handbook for the Recently Deceased lying around, to which Lydia and Otho were able to get ahold of it, as well as ignoring her earlier warning not to associate with Beetlejuice. She is seen smoking and the smoke emitting from her neck. Since the laws of the Neitherworld stipulate that those whose deaths are classified as suicides get assigned to be civil servants, Juno's cause of death was that she slit her own throat.

In second film, Juno does not appear, due to the death of Sylvia Sidney. In Beetlejuice's newspaper, it is stated that that she is among the case workers currently on strike.

=== Miss Argentina ===
Miss Argentina (also known as The Receptionist and Miss Receptionist) (Patrice Martinez in the film, Leslie Kritzer in the Broadway musical, and Danielle Marie Gonzalez in the US tour of the musical) is a receptionist that appears at the window in the Afterlife waiting room. As shown in the first film, it appears that she committed suicide by slitting her wrists. She informs Adam and Barbara Maitlandthat the Afterlife is "very personal" (pointing out various individuals in the waiting room) and tells them, "if I knew then, what I know now, I wouldn't have had my 'little accident'". Her statement refers to not knowing until it was too late that Neitherworld law stipulates that those who die by suicide are assigned to work as bureaucrats. Sometime in the 36-year time span between the first and second films, Miss Argentina was replaced at her station by a deceased fast food employee with a similar appearance. It is unknown whether this is a permanent replacement, or the Afterlife's years-long version of a simple shift change.

In the second film, she does not appear due to the death of Patrice Martinez. However, she is replaced by another receptionist (a Hot Dog Lady on a Stick) which implies that she joined Juno in the afterlife case worker's strike.

=== Otho Fenlock ===
Otho Fenlock (Glenn Shadix in the film, Kelvin Moon Loh in the Broadway musical, and Abe Goldfarb in the US tour of the musical) is Delia Deetz's former best friend. He is the secondary antagonist of the first film.

Before the events of the first film, he was schooled in chemistry and he was a hair analyst briefly. After his stint with the Living Theatre, Otho was one of New York City's leading paranormal researchers, until as he put it, "until the bottom dropped out in '72."

In the first film, Otho presents himself to be more successful than he actually is, often referring to past career failures as experience and success, though he seems to genuinely believe this despite the obvious. He seems to depend on the limelight for his own ego, Otho can commonly be seen pandering to those of higher status than himself to gain approval, and boost his own status, such as when he compliments art work of his employer. When Beetlejuice alters Otho's outfit into a summer suit, Otho is clearly mortified at the embarrassment, and runs away screaming.

=== Maxie Dean ===
Maxie Dean (Robert Goulet in the film, Danny Rutigliano in the Broadway musical, and Brian Vaughn in the US tour of the musical) is the chairman of Botco Industries.

In the first film, Maxie was the one who the Deetzes were hoping to cajole into financing their plan of turning the town into a supernatural tourist attraction. He and his wife, Sarah, were both last seen being sent flying through the roof of the Deetzes' living room by Beetlejuice.

In the second film, set 36 years later, during Charles' wake, it is revealed that Maxie Dean survived as he was listed and called out as a guest attending his former employee's funeral.

=== Sarah Dean ===
Sarah Dean (known as Maxine Dean in the Broadway musical) (Maree Cheatham in the film, Jill Abramovitz in the Broadway musical, and Karmine Alers in the US tour of the musical) is the wife of Maxie Dean.

In the first film, Sarah and her husband, Maxie, went to the house of the Deetz family. They were both last seen being sent flying through the roof of the Deetzes' living room by Beetlejuice.

=== Jane Butterfield ===
Jane Butterfield (Annie McEnroe) is a realtor, cousin to Barbara Maitland, and cousin-in-law to Barbara's husband Adam Maitland.

In the first film, Jane is quite the pushy sort, insistent to the point of annoying the Maitlands. She says they should sell the house to a family with children, claiming it is too big for just two people. Although Barbara firmly told her not to, Jane had been showing pictures of the Maitlands' home to clients (specifically, customers in New York) long before it was officially for sale. She even stuck her face onto the window of Adam's basement workshop to ask him to sell the place, even though he said no. When the Maitlands died, she immediately sold the house to the Deetzes. In a deleted scene, Jane tried to call the Deetzes to sell the house (possibly for a bigger client), but Deetzes (living peacefully with the Maitlands' ghosts) flatly stated that they are keeping the house and that they will never sell it, leaving Jane upset.

== Animated series ==
=== Jacques LaLean ===
Jacques LaLean (voiced by Charles Kerr) is a skeleton body builder with a strong French accent. He is very persistent, since he continues to exercise despite only being a skeleton without muscles.

=== Ginger ===
Ginger (voiced by Tabitha St. Germain) is a tap-dancing spider in Neitherworld. She is loosely based on Ginger Rogers.

=== The Monster Across the Street ===
The Monster Across the Street (voiced by Len Carlson) is Beetlejuice's neighbor who lives across the street in a cattle-skull shaped house. He hails from the Neitherwest. He owns a dog named Poopsie. The Monster hates Beetlejuice for pulling pranks on him. The Monster loves to play music on his banjo, loudly. His father got lost at sea many years ago, and is found on a tiny island in the episode "It's a Big, Big, Big, Big Ape".

=== Doomie ===
Doomie (also known as the Dragster of Doom) (voiced by Keith Hampshire as Doomie, Colin Fox as the Dragster of Doom) is Beetlejuice's living car, as well as one of his and Lydia Deetz's best friends. Most of the time, Doomie appears to be a happy-go-lucky, loyal, good-natured car that is always ready for a good time. However, he suffers a split-personality disorder due to Beetlejuice giving him an abnormal carburetor when he and Lydia created him. Because of this, Doomie will sometimes turn into a werewolf-like car, which is usually incited when he sees dogs. After his transformation, he will chase the dog until his transformation wears off.

=== Beetlejuice's family ===
==== Bea Juice ====
Bea Juice (voiced by Susan Roman) is the wife of Nat Juice, the mother of Beetlejuice and Donny Juice. She is a loving mother, who really loves and cares for her children, loves her husband, and is really nice to Lydia. She is a bit over-protective. She is also picky about clean hands and houses. Beetlejuice does love his mother, but he gets scared whenever she comes over to visit, because of her ways of telling him to take a bath.

==== Nat Juice ====
Nat Juice (voiced by Len Carlson) is the husband of Bea Juice, and the father of Beetlejuice and Donny Juice. A somewhat grumpy, but well-meaning, large Frankenstein-type man, he keeps telling B.J to "get a job" and is critical about him being unemployed, but it is mainly because he genuinely loves and cares about him, not that he is intentionally stubborn. Beetlejuice does love his dad as much as he loves him, though he gets annoyed when his father keeps telling him to get a job.

==== Donny Juice ====
Donald "Donny" Juice (voiced by Richard Binsley) is Beetlejuice's younger brother, son of Nat and Bea Juice. Donny is the favorite of family and friends and both brothers know it. He always has a smile and spare gift on hand for anyone he meets to the annoyance of Beetlejuice who rigs Donny's gifts with pranks (which backfires, as the receiver still enjoys the gift). Donny Juice is obliviously optimistic, brushing off Beetlejuice's insults and rude comments as jokes. Despite that, he cares deeply about other's opinions on him especially his brother's and admits he is aware his constant niceness drives the people around him crazy.

=== Bertha ===
Bertha (voiced by Tara Strong) is a friend of Lydia Deetz and Prudence in the real world. She is a tall girl with brown hair and buck teeth. Based on how she reacts to Betty (Beetlejuice in disguise), she seems to have a high tolerance to gross things.

=== Prudence ===
Prudence (voiced by Tabitha St. Germain) is a friend of Lydia Deetz in the real world. She and Bertha are two of Lydia's only close friends at school. She is a short, smart girl with orange hair and glasses, which she is near-sighted without, and thus has a hard time seeing what is going on around her. She is the quiet and shy member of Lydia's small group of friends. Prudence seems to scare easy, but usually gets over it quickly.

=== Claire Brewster ===
Claire Brewster (voiced by Tara Strong) is Lydia Deetz's arch-rival. Although Lydia faces worse enemies in the Neitherworld, Claire is arguably Lydia's biggest problem in the Otherworld. She constantly insults her and her friends Bertha and Prudence. The "spoiled rich kid" of Miss Shannon's School for Girls, Claire lives in a mansion with her parents and their servants. Beetlejuice hates the way she treats Lydia and punishes Claire by pulling cruel pranks on her.

=== Scuzzo the Clown ===
Scuzzo the Clown (voiced by Joseph Sherman) is a Neitherworld clown that wants to make everything funny and prove himself the afterlife's best prankster, making him Beetlejuice's most persistent rival. He is Beetlejuice's arch-nemesis. Scuzzo sometimes works with his brother Fuzzo the Clown, though he is the mastermind and leader of the two. Like Beetlejuice, he seems to share some of the same abilities as his rival, using similar ghostly and pun-based powers mostly centered around circus paraphernalia, mainly cannons and explosives. Unlike Beetlejuice though, Scuzzo is not as powerful, and his abilities are mostly limited to materializing objects or manipulating his own appearance or the appearance of others. His weaker powers force Scuzzo to rely on more devious tricks and careful planning in order to outwit Beetlejuice.

=== Mayor Maynot ===
Mayor Maynot (voiced by Len Carlson) is the mayor of the Neitherworld. He is always on Beetlejuice's case, and usually threatening to send him to Sandwormland. He has a quick temper and gets angry easy.

Unlike most characters in the series, Mayor Maynot got redesigned for the second season of the show. His two appearances in Season 1 show him as a short man with a green skin tone, with a large top hat. In Season 2 and onwards, he is instead a man of normal height who wears yellow bandages.

=== Mr. Big ===
Mr. Big (voiced by Len Carlson) is a gangster who is ironically small, but is large in several angles. One of these angles is his own ego, as he had the nerve to call all the other villains Beetlejuice ever faced "pathetic". Mr. Big is also large on matters of business and the brains to support it, as he was the one who figured out one thing, besides sandworms, that can destroy Beetlejuice: if he is dismembered too long, Beetlejuice loses his powers and is reduced to a puddle.

=== Lipscum ===
Lipscum (voiced by Harvey Atkin) is a creature who obviously has the biggest mouth in the Neitherworld, not just literally, but also because he is a bothersome chatterbox. In fact, everyone agrees he is the one citizen there who is more annoying than Beetlejuice. Sometimes Lipscum tries to help Beetlejuice with a prank or some other project, only to end up getting the zipper or the boot in the episode, "Smell-a-thon". Other times, he tries to join villains out to harm Beetlejuice, and uses videos of his failed attempts to befriend "the ghost with the most" to prove he belongs with them. He got in, but on the condition he shuts up.

=== Jesse Germs ===
Jesse Germs (voiced by Dan Hennessy) is a skeleton cowboy. He is probably one of the smoothest characters around, second only to Chester Slime. He is a cigarette poster-boy and one of those manly cowboy-types. He hires himself out to those needing someone to "eliminate" their adversaries. His name is a pun on the legendary western bank robber Jesse James.

=== Bartholomew Batt ===
Bartholomew Batt (voiced by John Stocker) is a bat who was once a popular cartoon character in the age of black and white animation. However, things have changed, as no one ties damsels to train tracks anymore, and nyuk-ing villain-types such as Bartholomew have since fallen to the wayside.

=== Little Miss Warden ===
Little Miss Warden (voiced by Tara Strong) is a prison warden in Neither Neither land who likes things that are sickeningly sweet. Second next to Claire Brewster, she has a six-year-old spoiled brat persona, as it is not cute, being "Scrumdilly-iscious" if she wants it to be. Little Miss Warden is the only other character besides Beetlejuice himself to have a unique verbal summoning spell. However, while others must say Beetlejuice's name three times to summon him or be summoned to his location, others must say the three words "Higgledy Biggledy Pop" while clasping their hands in order to be summoned to Little Miss Warden's location.

=== Prince Vince ===
Prince Vince (voiced by Hadley Kay) is the ruler of the Neitherworld who appears to suffer some kind of depression. His name is a parody of actor Vincent Price. Prince Vince is a perpetually sad character whose depression can get so bad that rain clouds form in his general area.

=== Barry MeNot ===
Barry MeNot is a character who appears in the CGI sequences in the series. He is the NTV (Neitherworld Television) personality who appears in various commercials that sometimes pop up to emphasize a particular plot point in a humorous aside. Unlike the rest of the show, Barry MeNot is animated using computer-generated animation.

== Beetlejuice, Beetlejuice ==
=== Astrid Deetz ===
Astrid Deetz (Jenna Ortega) is the daughter of Lydia and Richard Deetz and a main character of the second film.

Astrid was born to Lydia and Richard Deetz roughly 16 years before the events of the second film. She seems to have had a good childhood with her parents and grandparents despite her mother's psychic abilities and Delia's eccentric tendencies; she describes her grandfather, Charles Deetz, as the most sane person of the family. She was very close with her father who took her on his journeys to promote climate change.

At some point her parents’ marriage fell apart and her father died in a biting accident on the Amazon River. Astrid would go on to blame Lydia for their separation and his death, as she believed her mother was faking about seeing ghosts, especially given she was not able to see Richard's. The two become further estranged when Lydia began dating Rory, whom Astrid despised, to the point Astrid avoided speaking to her mother.

When Charles dies in an accident, Astrid reunites with Lydia and Delia, who pick her up from boarding school to take her back to Winter River, Connecticut for the funeral. Astrid brushes off Lydia's attempts to bond with her and is disgusted when Rory proposes to Lydia at Charles’ wake. Disgusted, she bikes through town and crashes into a fence, and meets a teenage boy named Jeremy Frazier. The two talk and find they have a lot in common, and make plans to hang out the next day.

Astrid roams to the attic and finds Adam Maitland's town model, and then a box of family pictures of her and her parents. Lydia finds her there and they start to bond until Lydia finds a Beetlejuice flyer and angrily tells Astrid to never say his name, causing her to storm out of the house and go meet Jeremy. At his house, she finds the Handbook for the Recently Deceased and she reads some pages about Code 699 and Sandworms. The two then make plans to hang out on Halloween. Astrid tells Lydia of her plans when Lydia decides to leave following an encounter with Beetlejuice.

On Halloween night, Lydia drops Astrid off at Jeremy's. The two end up kissing but also levitate, Astrid realizing Jeremy is a ghost. She panics but he offers to help her find her father in the Netherworld if she agrees to help him come back to live. He draws a door on the wall and has her read an incantation from the book before they enter the Waiting Room and are then directed to Immigration. Jeremy reveals he tricked her into trading her life for his, thereby trapping her in the afterlife while he returns to the living world. She is taken to the Soul Train station and sees her father working as an immigration officer. Lydia, having been helped by Beetlejuice, finds Astrid and they end up walking into one of Saturn's moons and are attacked by a Sandworm. Richard saves them and the three reconcile before going back to Immigration to stop Jeremy. Beetlejuice, disguised as the immigration officer, rejects his passport and sends Jeremy to Hell, saving Astrid. Helped by Richard, Astrid and Lydia return to the living world.

Astrid apologizes to Lydia for not believing her. Lydia goes to the church to meet Rory for their wedding despite Astrid insisting she does not have to marry him. Inside the church, Beetlejuice and Delia are waiting for them. Astrid attempts to say his name before Beetlejuice stops her and asks her to call him ‘Dad’. Astrid is initially surprised when Rory, injected with truth serum, admits he is only after Lydia for her money but smiles when Lydia punches him. As Beetlejuice prepares to marry Lydia, he possesses Astrid, Delia, Rory and the priest to sing and dance until the ceremony is interrupted by Wolf Jackson and then Delores, who demands Beetlejuice's soul. Astrid finds the page on Sandworms and summons one, which devours Delores and Rory. The women attempt to leave as Beetlejuice reminds Lydia of their agreement. Astrid says the marriage contract is null and void because he violated Code 699 by bribing Lydia into the afterlife, allowing Lydia to send Beetlejuice back to the Netherworld. Lydia and Astrid bid farewell to Delia and then embrace each other.

Lydia ends her TV show to spend more time with Astrid. In a dream, Lydia dreams of them visiting Dracula's castle, Astrid getting married and giving birth to a baby Beetlejuice.

=== Richard Deetz ===
Richard Deetz (Santiago Cabrera) is the ex-husband of Lydia Deetz and father of her daughter, Astrid. He is a pivotal character in the second film.

In the second film, when he was still alive, Richard was a man in his late forties to early fifties with fair olive skin, black hair, and brown eyes. As a ghost, Richard's skin was now a gray color and covered in bite marks. He wore a brown jacker, a yellow dress shirt, brown pants, and shoes. He also had some piranhas sticking out in different parts of his body; one hanging on his ear, one down his throat, and a couple on his torso.

=== Delores LaFerve ===
Delores LaFerve (Monica Bellucci) is the leader of a soul-absorbing death cult who married Beetlejuice, whom she poisoned, but, in revenge, he killed her with an ax to her face. Turned into a ghost, Delores sought revenge against her ex-husband. She is the secondary antagonist of the second film.

In the first film, during his first failed attempt at a forced marriage with Lydia Deetz, Beetlejuice revealed he had been married before, as he swore he would only get married once. He then removed the ring from a corpse finger and put it on Lydia, stating that "she meant nothing to him". This was the first clue to Delores' existence.

In the second film, Delores' dismembered pieces are revived in the Neitherworld when a janitor causes an electrical accident nearby. She reassembles herself with the help of an industrial stapler and devours the janitor's soul when he fails to tell her where Beetlejuice is. She then sucks the soul of a laundromat employee to steal a wedding dress, which she turns black. Detective Wolf Jackson deduces she is targeting Beetlejuice to force him to remarry her so she can take his soul. When he learns of her return, Beetlejuice hides in his office and plans to use his employee, Bob, as bait via disguising the Shrinker as himself. Delores wanders around the Netherworld and reaches his office, though it is empty. She is delighted to find his picture on his desk but angrily smashes the picture of Lydia before resuming her search. She finds Bob in an interrogation room and demands to know where Beetlejuice is. When he refuses to say, she sucks his soul, killing him. She enters the living world and interrupts his wedding to Lydia, horrifying him and he tries rejecting her to no avail. He uses Rory as bait and this allows Astrid to summon a Sandworm which devours Delores and Rory.

=== Wolf Jackson ===
Wolf Jackson (Willem Dafoe) is the head of the Afterlife crimes unit. Previously an actor, Wolf, after dying, became an officer in the Afterlife police unit to solve various crimes. He investigated against Delores and her ex-husband, Beetlejuice, who committed the crime of taking Lydia Deetz to the Neitherworld, although he respected Lydia and her family when she was able to defeat Delores.

In the second film, Wolf Jackson in life was an actor known for his role as a cop named Frank Hardballer. All his acting roles were done at his behest to be as realistic as possible but he was killed when a live grenade was tossed at his head while making a movie scene. After becoming a ghost, he became the head of the Afterlife crimes unit and used his police acting tactics to run the unit, as well as having his assistant frequently remind him to keep things real. When Delores escapes captivity and goes on a killing spree, Wolf summons Beetlejuice to his office to question him about his association with Delores, which Beetlejuice denies. Wolf does not believe him and warns him to keep a low profile until Delores is captured. Wolf continues his investigation when he is informed Beetlejuice illegally brought Lydia Deetz into the afterlife, and orders a manhunt for him. Wolf and his officers follow Beetlejuice into the living world and burst into the church where Beetlejuice is about to marry Lydia. Beetlejuice freezes Wolf and the officers to avoid being arrested but they are freed when Lydia sends Beetlejuice back to the afterlife. Wolf warns Lydia and Astrid Deetz to never meddle with the afterlife unless it is their time to cross over and takes Delia Deetz with him so she can return to the afterlife and reunite with her husband, Charles.

=== Bob ===
Bob (1372–2024) (Nick Kellington) is the lead shrinker who worked for Beetlejuice at the Afterlife call center. He was the only Shrinker who remained loyal to his boss when he allied himself with Lydia Deetz to save her daughter, Astrid, and covered for him while his ex-wife, Delores, hunted him. However, his soul was absorbed by Delores.

In the second film, over the next 36 years, Bob and several other shrinkers begin working for Beetlejuice in his bio-exorcism business. Bob becomes his most loyal employee and best friend, with Beetlejuice trusting Bob to take care of the business when he is away. When Delores escapes captivity and goes on a killing spree to find Beetlejuice and take his soul, Beetlejuice has Bob disguise himself as Beetlejuice so he can be bait. Beetlejuice also orders Bob to keep an eye on the others after he brings Lydia Deetz into the afterlife and goes to help her find her daughter, Astrid. However, the other shrinkers ignore Bob and escape into the living world. Bob is brought into the interrogation room at the Afterlife crime unit by Wolf Jackson, who demands Beetlejuice's whereabouts but Bob refuses to say. Delores later finds Bob and asks the same question but Bob again refuses to respond. She sucks out his soul, killing him.

=== Jeremy Frazier ===
Jeremy Damien Frazier (Arthur Conti) was a teenager in the 1990s and early 2000s that murdered his parents, then died when he fell out of his tree house and a major antagonist of the second film. To return to life, Jeremy tricked Astrid Deetz so they could exchange lives in the Neitherworld, but was ultimately sent to the Fires of Damnation by Beetlejuice.

In the second film, Jeremy was a teen with family problems. Not that coming from a respected well-to-do family is a problem, but Jeremy loathed them all. In 2001, Jeremy murdered his dad and mom in the house, before going out to the tree house to try to escape the police. He fell from the tree house, landing on his neck, killing him. For the past 23 years, 5 months and 14 days, he would haunt his house and the tree house outside giving the house the name "Murder House", but was unable to go further beyond his home. The realtor, Little Jane Butterfield, found herself stuck with the house.

One day in late October, Astrid Deetz had busted in through a fence to his yard, coming to his tree house. Jeremy noticed that she thought he was living, so he befriended her as he had plans for her. He shares a passion for old literature when the two connect over liking Crime and Punishment. The two spent time hanging out. On Halloween night, he had invited her over. Astrid came to his room upstairs in the house. He decorated his room with decorations from the basement. His costume was James Dean, but he commented that his parents thought he looked more like Richie Cunningham from Happy Days.

Upon kissing Astrid, it was revealed that he was actually dead, when he levitated in the air. He made up and excuse for his death. He said that he used to steal his dad's beers and hide in the tree house and that one day after him and his dad got into a fight he slipped while doing this. He actually fell and broke his neck when the police tried to get him out of the tree house to arrest him. Jeremy explained he couldn't go farther than the tree outside. He showed her his Handbook for the Recently Deceased, explaining how everyone gets a copy after they die.

He had her join him in going to the afterlife, saying he found a way to be human again, but he needed the help of a living person. He said he'd lead her to her father Richard if she accompanied him. He had fooled her as he had her read an incantation that trading her living life for his that opened the door to the afterlife. He led her through the door and at the ticket booth his real intentions were revealed. Astrid was then taken away from him to the 8:35 p.m. train on the Soul Train.

Jeremy had believed that he had outsmarted Astrid, telling her and her parents that they are too late. But Beetlejuice rejected his passport at immigration at Window 11, stamping it, with a stamp that said, "Shit Out of Luck!". He then pulled a lever that; opened a trapdoor to send him directly to the Fires of Damnation effectively sending him to Hell and ending his new life before it could even begin.

=== Rory ===
Rory (Justin Theroux) is a television star and ex-fiancé of Lydia Deetz and a secondary antagonist of the second film. He is a manager for "Ghost House with Lydia Deetz", who wanted to marry Lydia so he could exploit her for her money. He is a forty to fifty-year-old man with black hair tied in a small pony tail, brown eyes, and fair skin.
