= Jessica Vosk =

American actress and singer (born 1983)

- Vosk in 2026
- Born: September 30, 1983 (age 43)
- Education: University of Hartford; Montclair State University (BA)
- Occupations: Actress, singer
- Known for: Wicked, Hell's Kitchen, Beaches, Fiddler on the Roof, Finding Neverland, The Bridges of Madison County, Hazbin Hotel
- Website: jessicavosk.com

Jessica Vosk (born September 30, 1983) is an American actress and singer, best known for her performance as the lead role of Elphaba Thropp in Wicked, which she played on Broadway at the Gershwin Theatre from July 2018 to May 2019 (a period that included the show's 15th Anniversary). She also starred as Elphaba in the show's second national tour from September 2016 to September 2017.

Since 2024, she has voiced Lute in the adult animated musical series Hazbin Hotel.

Vosk has numerous other Broadway credits, including Jersey in Hell's Kitchen and in the musical adaptation of Beaches.

== Early life and education ==
Jessica Vosk was raised in Clinton, New Jersey, starting in community theater at a young age. Her father played in a band and first taught her how to sing. After graduating from North Hunterdon High School, she pursued a degree in musical theater at The Hartt School in West Hartford, Connecticut, but transferred to Montclair State University, graduating with a degree in Communications and Public and Investor Relations. She worked in investor relations for three years on Wall Street before deciding to pursue her Broadway ambitions.

== Career ==
=== Theatre ===
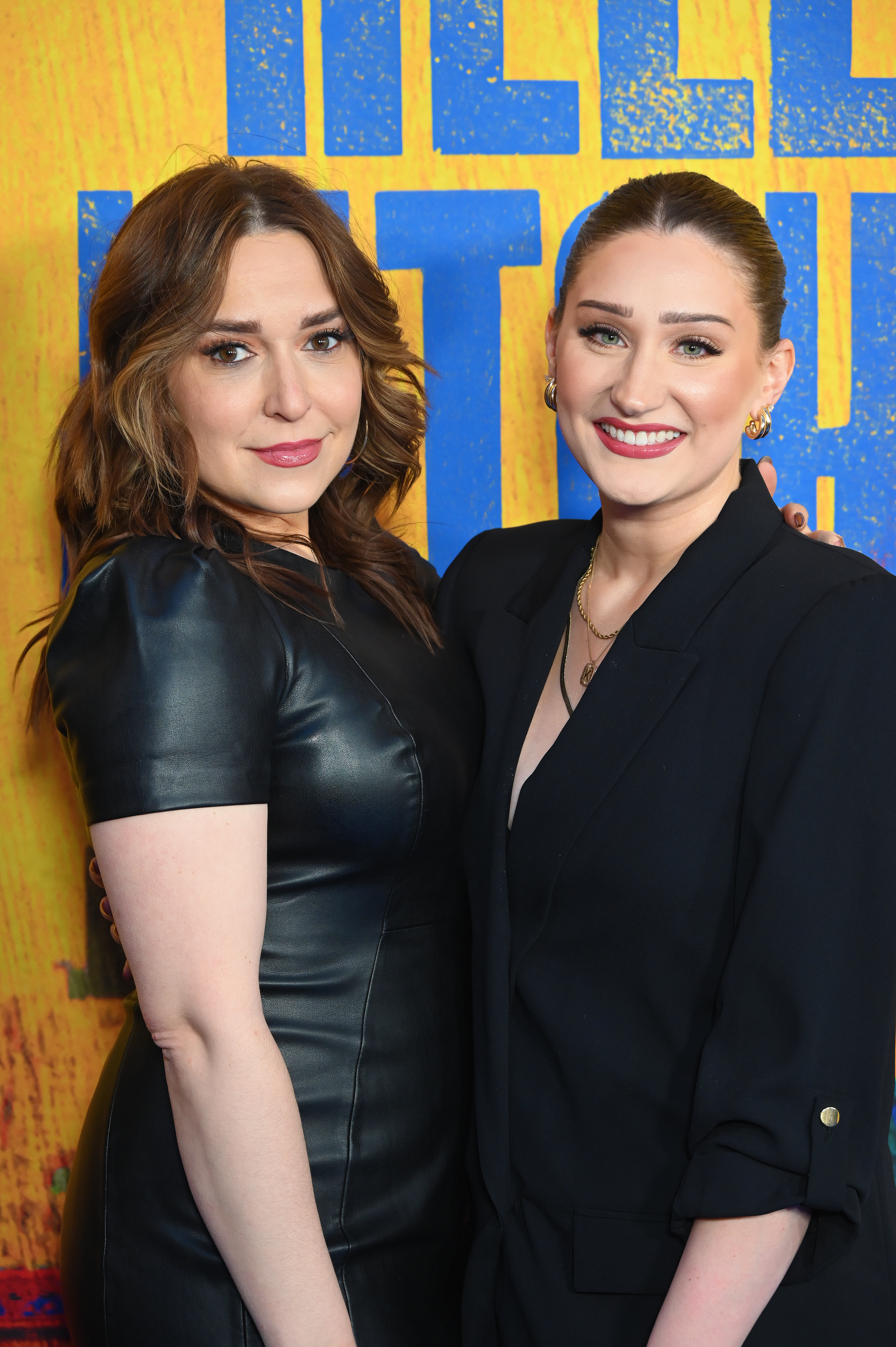
Vosk and Kelsee Kimmel at one-year anniversary of Hell's Kitchen.

Vosk's big break came in 2009 when she was cast as a vocalist for the live concert Kristina written by Benny Andersson and Björn Ulvaeus of ABBA and performed at Carnegie Hall and at London's Royal Albert Hall.

Vosk made her Broadway debut in 2014 in Jason Robert Brown's The Bridges of Madison County. She was cast as a swing, and she made her principal debut as Marian. She also was an understudy for the role of Chiara.

From The Bridges of Madison County she went to Finding Neverland, in which she was in the original Broadway production playing the role of Miss Bassett and an understudy for Mrs. du Maurier.

Vosk played Fruma Sarah in the 2015–2016 Broadway revival of Fiddler on the Roof. She was also an understudy for the roles of Golde and Yente.

Also in 2014, she performed as Anita in the San Francisco Symphony's live recording of the West Side Story score which was nominated for a Grammy Award for Best Musical Theater Album at the 57th Annual Grammy Awards.

Vosk left Fiddler on The Roof in 2016 to join the cast of the Second National Tour of Wicked succeeding Emily Koch in the lead role of Elphaba Thropp. She made her debut in South Bend, Indiana on September 7, 2016, opposite Amanda Jane Cooper as Glinda Upland. Her last show on the tour was September 24, 2017, in Cincinnati, Ohio.

On June 18, 2018, it was announced that Vosk would reprise the role of Elphaba in the Broadway production of Wicked, succeeding Jackie Burns. Her first performance took place on July 16, 2018, at the Gershwin Theatre. Vosk ended her run as Elphaba on May 12, 2019, and was succeeded by Hannah Corneau. Vosk was the winner of the 2019 Broadway.com Audience Choice Award for Best Replacement (Female) for her portrayal of Elphaba.

Also in 2019 Vosk originated the role of Aunt Val in the world premiere of the musical adaptation of Becoming Nancy. The production played at the Coca-Cola Stage at the Alliance Theatre, which is part of the Atlanta Theatre Company from September 6 to October 6, 2019. Vosk was the winner of the BroadwayWorld Atlanta Best Actress in a Musical Award.

On February 17, 2020, Vosk appeared as one of The Narrators in the 50th Anniversary concert of Joseph and the Amazing Technicolor Dreamcoat at Lincoln Center.

In May 2024, Vosk led the cast of the first production of Beaches The Musical at Theatre Calgary.

From July 30, 2024 to August 5, 2024, Vosk performed as Jenna in the Muny production of Waitress.

On October 16, 2024, it was announced that Vosk would return to Broadway joining the cast of the Alicia Keys musical Hell's Kitchen. She succeeded original cast member Tony nominee Shoshana Bean in the role of strict mother Jersey. Her first performance was on December 12, 2024 at the Shubert Theatre. Her final performance in the show was November 30, 2025.

On December 16, 2025 it was announced that Vosk would originate her first starring role on Broadway as Cee Cee Bloom in Beaches alongside Kelli Barrett. Her first performance was on March 27, 2026 at the Majestic Theatre.

=== Recording work ===
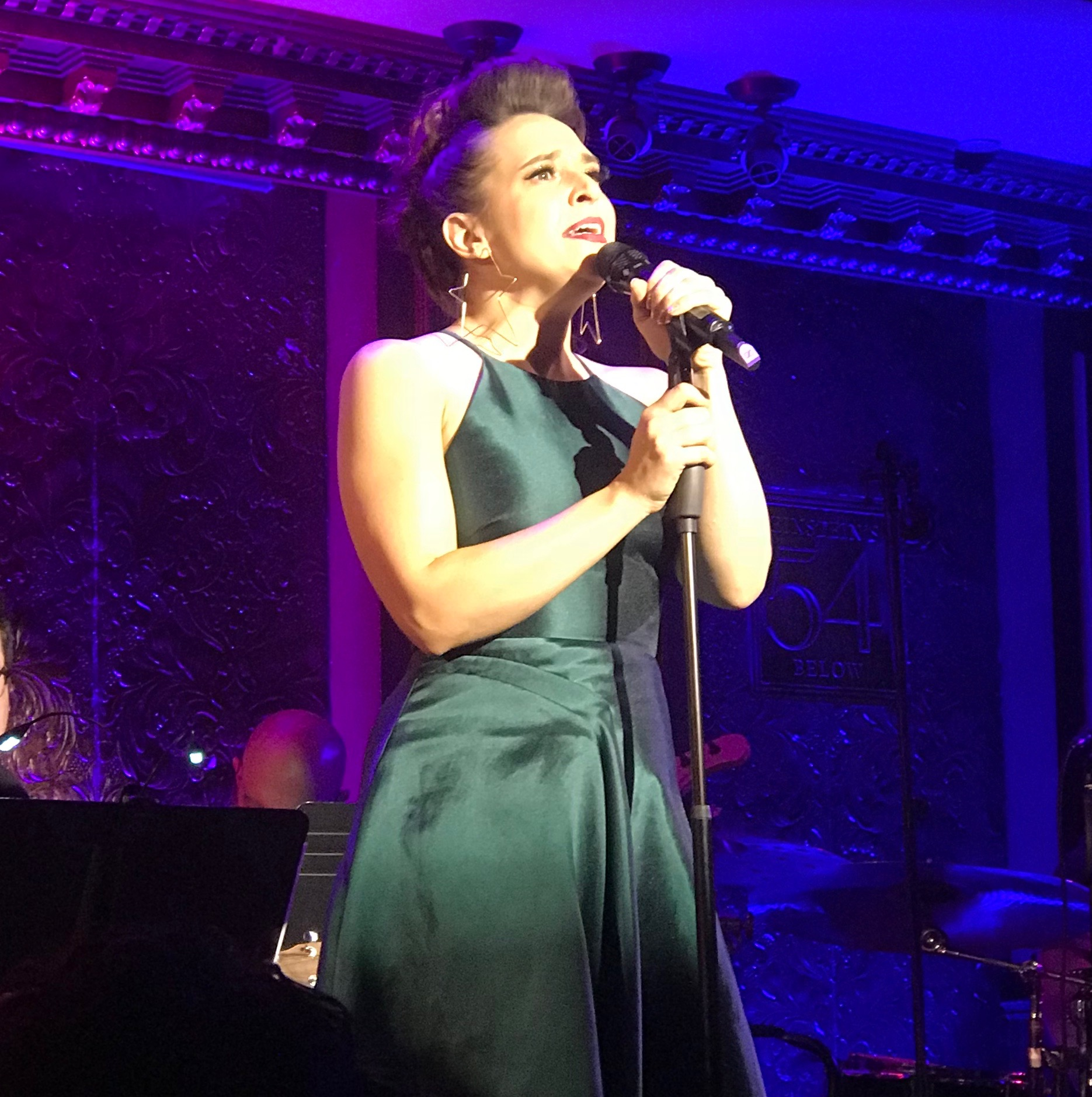
Vosk in 2018

Vosk released her first album titled Wild and Free on August 10, 2018. The album is a mix of musical theatre and pop and includes songs by Sara Bareilles, Jason Robert Brown, Prince, Sia, Pasek and Paul, and more. The album debuted on the Billboard Charts at No. 29 for Independent Artists and No. 12 for Heatseekers (up and coming musicians).

Vosk released an EP of Christmas songs titled A Very CoCo Christmas on December 9, 2020.

In June 2024, Vosk released two new singles.

On October 25, 2024, it was announced that Vosk will release her full-length Christmas album entitled Sleigh from Concord Theatricals. It would feature Vosk performing her take on Holiday favorites along with special guests Neil Patrick Harris, David Foster, Ariana DeBose, and Scott Hoying. The album would be released for digital downloading and streaming platforms on November 15, 2024. Physical copies would be released on December 6, 2024, in stores.

=== Solo concerts ===
After wrapping The Bridges of Madison County, Vosk made her cabaret debut at 54 Below with her first solo show entitled I Came to Jersey for This in February 2015, the show featured Vosk performing songs that really inspired her growing up on music. The concert was well received by fans and critics.

Her sophomore cabaret act You Asked for It would debut in February 2016 at Joe's Pub featured Vosk performing a lot of diva-based anthems that inspired her wanting to become a gay icon.

Following her run on the first National Tour of Wicked in 2018, Vosk returned to 54 Below with Bein' Green, a solo show commemorating talking about what her life was like within a year of life on the road. Many of the songs from the Bein' Green show eventually all appear on Vosk's debut album Wild and Free.

Following her departure from Wicked on Broadway, Vosk began touring in support of her debut album Wild & Free in 2018.

On November 8, 2021, Vosk made her solo debut at Carnegie Hall with a program entitled My Golden Age playing to a sold-out audience. The concert featured an ultimate showcase of Vosk paying tribute to all her musical influences. Following the success of her solo debut there, Vosk would continue to develop a strong relationship with Carnegie Hall including a 2022 return performing a tribute concert to Judy Garland commemorating her 100th Birthday entitled Get Happy, a concert she previously also performed in San Francisco, CA with the San Francisco Symphony. She also hosted an 8-episode podcast with Carnegie Hall entitled If The Hall Could Talk, centering on many of Carnegie Hall's notable artifacts from the Hall's archive museum.

In June 2023, Vosk presented a tribute solo entitled California Dreamin' at the 92nd Street Y. The show featured Vosk performing a selection of songs by some of the greatest singer-songwriters from Laurel Canyon, California. Since the New York premiere, Vosk has continued to perform the concert doing multiple configurations with a small band or a symphony orchestra.

In support of her new holiday album Sleigh, Vosk embarked on a mini-Symphony holiday tour. She sang for 3 nights with the National Symphony Orchestra at the Kennedy Center in Washington, D.C. She then followed it up with a return to Carnegie Hall for a 2-night concert with the New York Pops and Essential Voices USA, as part their annual holiday concert there.

Vosk also toured in 2025 after she left Hell's Kitchen.

=== Other work ===
Vosk is also the host of "Vosk in the City", a popular, fun street interview series.

She was the co-host of the podcast "Killing it on Broadway" with Jennifer Simard.

Vosk voiced Lute in the Amazon Prime Video original series Hazbin Hotel.

== Personal life ==
Vosk has been a resident of West New York, New Jersey, and has a dog named Fred. In 2025 she became engaged to Dave Godar. Vosk and Godar married on July 18th 2026

=== Food allergies ===
Vosk has been open about advocating for those with severe food allergies as she has several herself, including sesame seeds, shellfish, tree nuts, and most dangerously peanuts. When she first began her Wicked contract in July 2018, Vosk was nearly killed when eating a cookie that she confirms “definitely had nut in it”. Vosk's entire face and body swelled up like a balloon and became covered in rashes before she entered Anaphylaxis and she had to use an EpiPen and immediately be rushed to the emergency room.

On December 3, 2018, Vosk performed at the Food Allergy Research and Education's (FARE) 21st Annual Food Allergy Ball at the Ziegfeld Ballroom in New York City. Vosk gave major praise to the event stating, “It's like, ‘Oh my God, you actually get it!’ To be in a room full of people who have a plethora of allergies and to know that the food will be safe, that's literally a dream for me. I'm not joking. It's truly a dream”.

On March 9, 2026, Vosk uploaded a video to her TikTok platform stating ‘you told Tyra you’re deathly allergic to nuts and almost died’ where she pretends to eat peanuts and jokingly portrays her death, generating over 24k views and 2200 likes.

== Theatre credits ==
Year(s)	Production	Role	Location	Category
2014	West Side Story	Anita	Louise M. Davies Symphony Hall	San Francisco Symphony Concert
2014	The Bridges of Madison County	Swing u/s Carolyn u/s Marian	Gerald Schoenfeld Theatre	Broadway
2015	Finding Neverland	Miss Bassett / Ensemble u/s Mrs du Maurier	Lunt-Fontanne Theatre	Broadway
2015–16	Fiddler on the Roof	Fruma Sarah u/s Golde	Broadway Theatre	Broadway
2016–17	Wicked	Elphaba Thropp	Various	National Tour
2018–19	Wicked	Elphaba Thropp	Gershwin Theatre	Broadway
2019	Becoming Nancy	Aunt Val / Kate Bush	Alliance Theatre	World Premiere
2020	Joseph and the Amazing Technicolor Dreamcoat	The Narrator	David Geffen Hall at Lincoln Center	50th Anniversary Concert
2022	Joseph and the Amazing Technicolor Dreamcoat	The Narrator	The Muny	Regional
2023	Chess	Florence Vassy	The Muny	Regional
2023	Gutenberg! The Musical!	The Producer (one night cameo)	James Earl Jones Theatre	Broadway
2024	Waitress	Jenna Hunterson	The Muny	Regional
2024–25	Hell's Kitchen	Jersey	Shubert Theatre	Broadway
2026	Beaches	Cee Cee Bloom	Majestic Theatre	Broadway
2026	Bill Pay: The Musical	Lisa Bloopy	Broadhurst Theatre	Industrial Musical

== Filmography ==
=== Television ===
Year(s)	Title	Role	Notes
2023	East New York	Jess Anthony	Episode: "By the Book"
2023	Schmigadoon!	Little Girl's Mother	Episode: "Welcome to Schmicago"
2024–present	Hazbin Hotel	Lute (voice)	7 episodes

== Solo concerts and cabarets ==
- 2015: I Came from Jersey for This! (Feinstein's/54 Below)
- 2016: You Asked for It (Joe's Pub)
- 2018: Being Green (Feinstein's / 54 Below)
- 2019–present: Wild and Free: In Concert (Various)
- 2021: My Golden Age (Carnegie Hall)
- 2022: Get Happy: A Judy Garland Centennial Celebration
- 2023–present: California Dreamin: The Songs of Laurel Canyon
- 2024: Christmas Symphony Tour

== Discography ==
=== LPs ===
- 2018: Wild and Free (Broadway Records)
- 2024: Sleigh (Concord Theatricals)

=== EPs ===
- 2020: A Very CoCo Christmas (Vosky Records)

=== Singles ===
List of singles, with selected chart positions, showing year released and album name
Title	Year	Peak chart positions					Album
Title	Year	US Bub.	CAN	IRE	NZ Hot	UK	Album
"Gravity" (with Alex Brightman, Sam Haft, and Andrew Underberg)	2025	4	80	82	4	53	Hazbin Hotel: Season 2 (Original Soundtrack)
"—" denotes a recording that did not chart or was not released in that territory.

=== Other charted songs ===
List of other charted songs, with selected chart positions, showing year released and album name
Title	Year	Peak chart positions			Album
Title	Year	US Bub.	NZ Hot	UK Ind.	Album
"You Didn't Know" (with Andrew Underberg, Sam Haft, Erika Henningsen, Shoba Narayan, Patina Miller, and Stephanie Beatriz)	2024	25	24	47	Hazbin Hotel Original Soundtrack (Pt. 2)
"When I Think About the Future" (with Erika Henningsen, Stephanie Beatriz, Krystina Alabado, Keith David, Kevin Del Aguila, Kimiko Glenn, Shoba Narayan, Christian Borle, Amir Talai, Joel Perez, Lilli Cooper, Jeremy Jordan, Patrick Stump, and Patina Miller)	2025	—	37	—	Hazbin Hotel: Season 2 (Original Soundtrack)
"Hear My Hope" (with Shoba Narayan, Erika Henningsen, Keith David, Kimiko Glenn, Stephanie Beatriz, Blake Roman, Kevin Del Aguila, Krystina Alabado, Patrick Stump, Alex Brightman, Daphne Rubin-Vega, James Monroe Iglehart, Andrew Durand, Leslie Kritzer, Amir Talai, Alex Newell, Joel Perez, Lilli Cooper, and Christian Borle)	2025	—	20	—	Hazbin Hotel: Season 2 (Original Soundtrack)

== Awards and nominations ==
Year	Award	Category	Show	Result	Ref.
2018	Broadway.com Cabaret Awards	Best Show, Celebrity	Being Green	Won	
2019	Broadway.com Audience Awards	Best Replacement	Wicked	Won	
2019	Broadway.com Regional Awards (Atlanta)	Best Actress in a Musical (Professional)	Becoming Nancy	Won	
2020	BroadwayWorld Cabaret Awards	Best Filmed Show, Created in Quarantine	Radio Free Birdland	Won	
2026	Broadway.com Audience Awards	Favorite Leading Actress in a Musical	Beaches	Nominated	
2026	Broadway.com Audience Awards	Favorite Diva Performance	Beaches	Nominated	
2026	Drama League Award	Distinguished Performance	Beaches	Nominated	
2026	Outer Critics Circle Award	Outstanding Lead Performer in a Broadway Musical	Beaches	Nominated	
