= The Shark Is Broken =

2019 play

- 2023 playbill cover
- Original language: English
- Written by: Ian Shaw; Joseph Nixon
- Based on: The filming of Jaws
- Characters: Robert Shaw; Richard Dreyfuss; Roy Scheider
- Genre: Comedy
- Setting: 1974, Martha’s Vineyard

Premiere
- Date: 24 July 2019
- Place: Rialto Theatre, Brighton
- Official website

The Shark Is Broken is a comedic stage play written by British playwrights Ian Shaw and Joseph Nixon. The play is a comedic exploration of the behind-the-scenes drama that took place during the filming of the 1975 film Jaws, which was directed by Steven Spielberg and starred Shaw's father, Robert Shaw, as well as Roy Scheider and Richard Dreyfuss.

== Premise ==
In 1974, the filming of Jaws is under way. The film's three lead actors — Robert Shaw, Richard Dreyfuss and Roy Scheider — are stuck together on the boat Orca because Bruce, the mechanical shark used in the film, is broken. Filming has consequently been stalled for several days, turning into weeks. The Shark Is Broken explores the three actors' boredom, arguments, and stories told aboard the boat during the delay.

The first part of the play sees the three actors arrive on set for the eighth week of filming. They are told the shark is broken, and they start to wait it out aboard the boat. Tensions begin to occur as the three begin to realize how arduous filming the movie has become.

The second part begins to establish the hierarchy between the three actors: Shaw, the veteran actor; the young and ambitious Dreyfuss; and Scheider, who attempts to be the peacekeeper so they can all just finish filming the movie. The trio find ways to pass the time — now in the tenth week of filming the movie. Aided by alcohol, they share vulnerabilities and stories. Nevertheless, boredom continues to creep in on the actors.

The third part takes place at the end of filming Jaws, with the three actors still struggling to understand what the movie is all about. Bored and waiting for filming to wrap, the three engage in rambling, philosophical conversations on the meaning of the movie.

Throughout the play, Shaw struggles with the USS Indianapolis speech: he finds the material written by John Millius unperformable and obtains Spielberg's permission to rewrite it. His alcoholism and conflict with Dreyfuss interferes with each successive rehearsal of the scene. A full rendition of the famous scene ends the play.

== Production history ==
The Shark Is Broken premiered on 24 July 2019 at the Rialto Theatre in Brighton, England, for a three-day run. Following this, it transferred to the 2019 Edinburgh Festival Fringe presented by Guy Masterson's Theatre Tours International, where it played at the Assembly George Square Studios from 2 August 2019 to 25 August 2019. Ian Shaw portrayed his father, Robert Shaw, with Liam Murray Scott as Richard Dreyfuss and Duncan Henderson as Roy Scheider. The original production was also directed by Guy Masterson.

The play was scheduled to premiere in the West End at the Ambassadors Theatre in May 2020; this was postponed because of the COVID-19 pandemic. Following the closures, The Shark Is Broken began performances at the Ambassadors Theatre on 9 October 2021. Shaw and Murray Scott reprised their roles, with Demetri Goritsas replacing Henderson as Roy Scheider. Guy Masterson returned as Director. Although the show was originally scheduled to close on 15 January 2022, the run was extended until 13 February 2022. The show received a Laurence Olivier Award nomination for Best Entertainment or Comedy Play. On 11 February 2022, lead producer Sonia Friedman announced that the show has recouped its costs and hinted towards future productions.

The Shark Is Broken made its North American premiere at the Royal Alexandra Theatre in Toronto, Ontario. The Toronto previews began on 25 September 2022, with an official opening night on 30 September 2022, before closing on 6 November 2022. Shaw, Goritsas, and Murray Scott all reprised their roles and Guy Masterson directed.

The Broadway production of the play opened at the John Golden Theatre in New York on 10 August 2023, with previews beginning on 25 July 2023. This was a strictly limited engagement, with performances ending on 19 November 2023. Ian Shaw reprised his role as his father, Robert Shaw; Alex Brightman and Colin Donnell portrayed Richard Dreyfuss and Roy Scheider, respectively. The director was Guy Masterson.

The play will tour the UK and Ireland beginning at Oxford Playhouse in January 2025. Ian Shaw will again reprise his role as his father, Robert Shaw. Additional casting is to be announced.

== Cast and principal roles ==
=== Company ===
Role	Edinburgh Fringe	West End	Toronto	Broadway	UK and Ireland tour
Role	2019	2021	2022	2023	2025
Robert Shaw	Ian Shaw	Ian Shaw	Ian Shaw	Ian Shaw	Ian Shaw
Richard Dreyfuss	Liam Murray Scott	Liam Murray Scott	Liam Murray Scott	Alex Brightman	Ashley Margolis
Roy Scheider	Duncan Henderson	Demetri Goritsas	Demetri Goritsas	Colin Donnell	Dan Fredenburgh

=== Characters ===
- Robert Shaw, an English actor and writer. In Jaws, he portrayed Quint, a shark hunter and captain of the Orca.
- Richard Dreyfuss, a young American actor. In Jaws, he portrayed Matt Hooper, a marine biologist hired by Martin Brody.
- Roy Scheider, an American actor. In Jaws, he portrayed police chief Martin Brody.

== Reception ==
The play was universally praised, sold out its run and extended by four performances at the Edinburgh Fringe in 2019 leading to Sonia Friedman committing to producing it at the Ambassadors Theatre in London's West End in 2021. There, the show was again widely praised and garnered an Olivier Award nomination for Best New Entertainment or Comedy Play.

In Toronto, the play received a slightly lesser critical response but audiences considered it a popular hit.

On Broadway, the reviews were generally mixed, but audiences gave it a rapturous response. Whoopi Goldberg attended the show and called it "an incredible play that you will love!... Not only funny but very moving..." however, Richard Dreyfuss, who attended on the same night and posed with her and the cast backstage for the press after the show, afterwards said that he was unhappy with its portrayal of him, where he is something of a naive comic relief character ("They made my character the fool"). In an interview with Vanity Fair, he complained that Ian Shaw had not contacted him for his side of the story, and thought the play overstated the feud between him and Robert Shaw. He thought that the play was likely influenced by stories from Carl Gottlieb (screenwriter) and Steven Spielberg (director) of the feud, but that they had the wrong impression. Dreyfuss granted that while he and Shaw did spar, it was usually only "playful ribbing" in Dreyfuss's telling. He said that the only incident which really qualified as a bad day was when he threw Shaw's bourbon overboard, which is in the play, but that fences mended more quickly afterward than shown in the play.

== Awards and nominations ==
=== London production ===
Year	Award	Category	Nominee	Result
2022	Laurence Olivier Awards	Best Entertainment or Comedy Play		Nominated
2022	WhatsOnStage Awards	Best Video Design	Nina Dunn	Nominated
