= My Golden Age =

- Concert by Jessica Vosk
- Promotional poster for the concert
- Venue: Carnegie Hall, New York City
- Date(s): November 8, 2021
- No. of shows: 1

Jessica Vosk concert chronology
- Wild and Free: In Concert 2019-Present; My Golden Age 2021

My Golden Age was a solo concert by American singer and actress Jessica Vosk, at Carnegie Hall in New York City, New York on November 8, 2021. The show was sold-out, due in part to Vosk's large following from her career on Broadway in Wicked, Fiddler on the Roof, and Finding Neverland. Directed by Tony Award winner Warren Carlyle, with musical direction by Mary-Mitchell Campbell, and accompanied by a small orchestra, Vosk paid tribute to the artists who inspired her, including Barbra Streisand, Judy Garland, Bette Midler, Linda Ronstadt, and others. Vosk was joined by guest artists including Kristin Chenoweth, Scott Hoying, Sara Mearns, and newcomer Alvis Green Jr. It was one of many live concerts returning to New York City after live theaters and venues were closed due to the COVID-19 pandemic.
