= There Are No Ghosts at the Grand =

Upcoming video game

- Developer: Friday Sundae
- Publisher: Friday Sundae
- Engine: Unity
- Platforms: Windows; Xbox Series X/S
- Release: Q4 2026
- Genres: Simulation, adventure
- Mode: Single-player

There Are No Ghosts at the Grand is an upcoming video game developed and published by Friday Sundae. It will be released in 2026 for Windows and Xbox Series X/S.

== Gameplay ==
During the day, the player is tasked to renovate a decrepit hotel using various cleaning tools. After nightfall, the player fights against ghosts, using the cleaning tools as weapons. The tasks are assisted by an 'AI DIY Assistant'' Robert C MacBrushy, a Scottish paintbrush who talks to the player.

Players progress through the game by cleaning up rooms, finding hidden secrets and solving puzzles. Characters are also noted to have their own distinct songs related to their own storyline, and the game boasts a soundtrack featuring British Ska, Punk and Wartime Jazz. Songs are an involved part of the story with players able to alter verse with their own lyrics in duets.

The game also features a small open world with the player able to traverse the various locations freely and explore, but with the hard time limit of 30 days and 30 nights players must choose carefully what they choose to prioritise.

== Plot ==
After inheriting a dilapidated hotel, the Grand, from his missing father, protagonist Chris David is tasked to renovate it. By day, Chris cleans the hotel, but by night, he must fend off the ghosts that haunt the Grand. Also at night, he can speak to the hotel cat, Mr. Bones the Bastard, who gives him guidance on how to save himself from the cursed hotel. Chris is given 30 days to fully restore the Grand before his soul is consumed by the hotel itself.

Chris is notably also looking for something while he explores, and must balance his time between the restoration, protecting himself and uncovering whatever he is looking for.

== Development ==
Developer Friday Sundae is based in Bristol, England.
