= Alex Brightman =

American actor (born 1987)

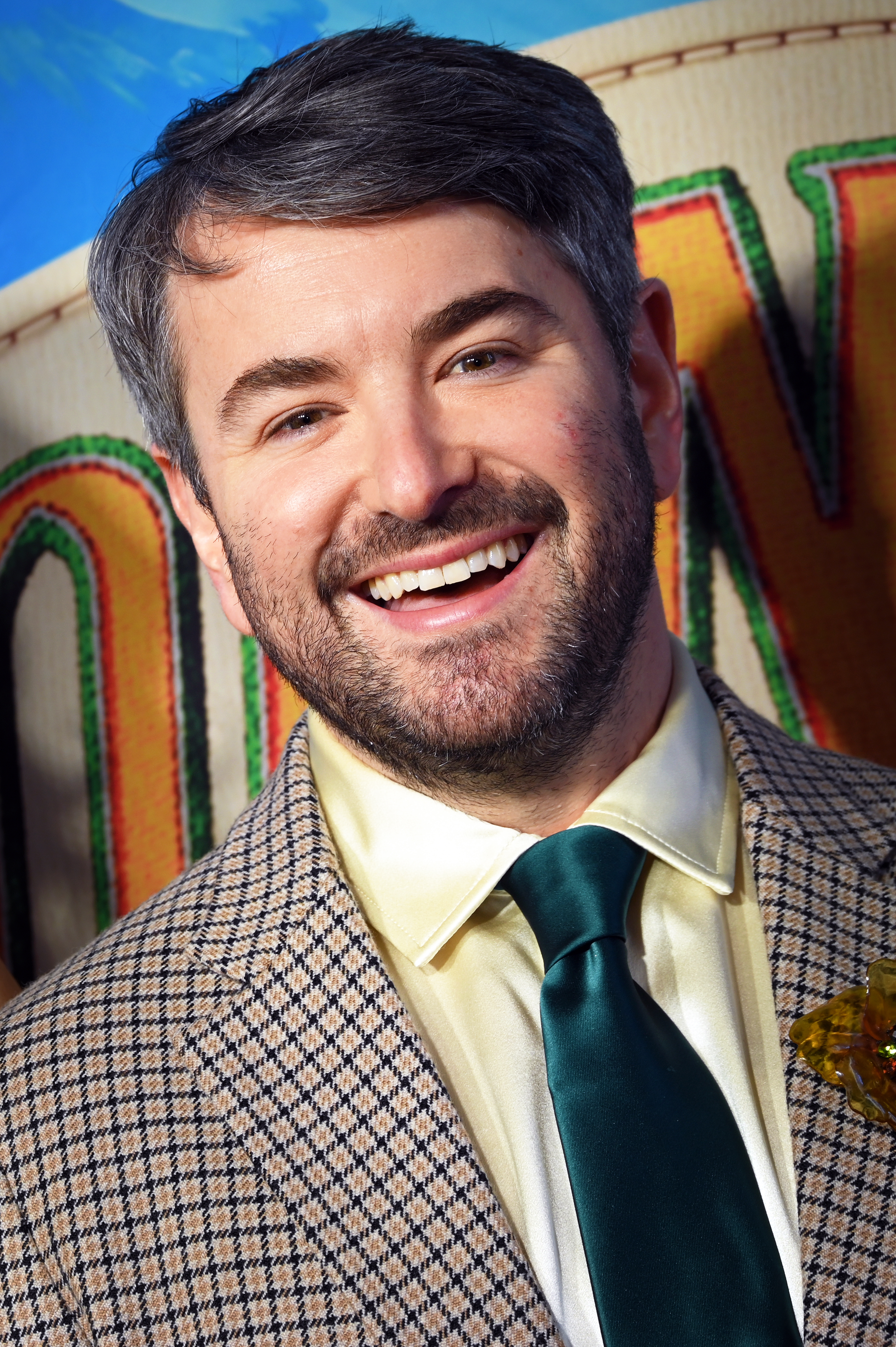
- Brightman in 2026
- Born: Alexander Michael Brightman; February 5, 1987 (age 39); Santa Clara, California, U.S.
- Occupation: Actor
- Years active: 1998–present
- Spouse: Jenny Ravitz (m. 2018)

Alexander Michael Brightman (born February 5, 1987) is an American actor and writer best known for his work in musical theatre.

In 2015, Brightman originated the role of Dewey Finn in the musical adaptation of School of Rock, earning him a nomination for the Tony Award for Best Actor in a Musical in 2016. In 2019, he originated the role of the titular character in Beetlejuice The Musical, earning him another Tony nomination.

Since 2020, he has voiced Robo Fizz and Fizzarolli in the adult animated musical series Helluva Boss, and since 2024, he has voiced Sir Pentious and Adam in Hazbin Hotel.

== Early life ==
Brightman grew up in Saratoga, California and is Jewish. His father founded Apple's Worldwide Disabilities Solutions Group, and his mother ran a kidney dialysis clinic. He attended Bellarmine College Preparatory, an all-male Jesuit high school in San Jose, California, and graduated in 2005. In addition, he performed with Children's Musical Theater San Jose during his youth. In 2007, Brightman performed alongside Ali Stroker in "Mrs. Sharp" by Ryan Scott Oliver and Kirsten Guenther at N.Y.U under the direction of Ryan Mekenian and musical direction of Alex Lacamoire.

== Career ==
=== Broadway ===
Brightman first worked on Broadway in 2008, as an ensemble member and understudy in Glory Days, which closed after only one performance. Brightman never performed in the show. Thereafter, in the same year, Brightman was cast as the munchkin Boq and made his Broadway debut in Wicked. He stayed with the show for two years. His next Broadway role was in 2012 in Big Fish as an ensemble member and an understudy for a main role. Later in 2013, Brightman was cast as Michael Wormwood in Matilda the Musical.

In 2014, Brightman joined Andrew Lloyd Webber's musical, School of Rock, adapted from the 2003 film of the same name. Initially, Brightman played various roles that were meant to be played by child actors but were performed by adults for the workshops. Brightman was cast in the starring role of Dewey, first, in the show's concert performances, and then, in his first starring role, in the Broadway production. Brightman performed as Dewey Finn at the Winter Garden Theatre on Broadway. For this performance, Brightman received a nomination for the 2016 Tony Award for Best Actor in a Musical. Brightman played his final performance as Dewey on November 5, 2016 and returned to reprise the role for a limited run in April 2017. He returned to Broadway in 2019 to play the title role in Beetlejuice (based on the film of the same name), and reprised the role in 2022. He was again nominated for the Tony Award for Best Actor in a Musical at the 73rd Tony Awards ceremony. From August 10 to November 19, 2023, he joined Colin Donnell and Ian Shaw in The Shark Is Broken as Richard Dreyfuss.

From January 9 to April 7, 2024, he played the role of Sir Lancelot in a Broadway revival of the musical Spamalot. Brightman is currently playing the role of Josh Skinner in the Broadway stage production of Schmigadoon!, beginning with previews on April 4, 2026, at the Nederlander Theatre, with an official opening on April 20.

=== Other work ===
Brightman is a member of the comedy group, The (M)orons, along with fellow Broadway actors/writers, Andrew Kober, F. Michael Haynie, and Drew Gasparini.

Brightman and Gasparini developed The Life and Slimes of Marc Summers in 2016.

Brightman is currently developing two new musicals entitled The Whipping Boy, based on the book, and It's Kind of a Funny Story (based on the novel of the same name), with Gasparini, for which Brightman wrote the script. Brightman made an appearance on Impractical Jokers during Brian "Q" Quinn's musical punishment that's based on the latter's real-life experience as a firefighter and leaving that life behind for TV fame. In October 2019, it was announced that Brightman will be joining the cast of the Billy Crystal helmed comedy film Here Today. In 2020, Brightman began voicing the character Fizzarolli, and his robotic doppelganger Robo Fizz, in the animated web series Helluva Boss. In addition, he voiced Pugsley and the demon possessing him, Temeluchus, in the Netflix animated series Dead End: Paranormal Park.

In the tenth season of The Blacklist, he plays Herbie Hambright, a father and forensic scientist.

Since 2024, he has starred as the voices of Sir Pentious and Adam in Hazbin Hotel.

== Personal life ==
Brightman married casting director Jenny Ravitz on May 21, 2018 at a ceremony in Brooklyn.

Brightman has revealed that he utilizes ventricular fold phonation, allowing him to create the signature gruff voice of Beetlejuice and Fizzarolli without strain on his vocal cords.

During a 2023 interview for The Shark Is Broken, Brightman revealed that he has bipolar disorder.

== Stage credits ==
Year	Production	Role	Category	Location
2008	Glory Days	u/s Will; u/s Jack	Broadway	Circle in the Square Theatre
2008–2010	Wicked	Boq Woodsman	Broadway	Gershwin Theatre
2012	35MM: A Musical Exhibition	Ensemble	Off-Broadway	Galapagos Art Space
2012-2013	Stars of David: Story to Song	Leonard Nimoy (Leonard the Great)	Off-Broadway	Suzanne Roberts Theatre
2013	Big Fish	Zacky Price, Ensemble; u/s Will Bloom	Pre-Broadway	Oriental Theatre
2013	Big Fish	Zacky Price, Ensemble; u/s Will Bloom	Broadway	Neil Simon Theatre
2014–2015	Matilda the Musical	Michael Wormwood	Broadway	Shubert Theatre
2015–2016	School of Rock	Dewey Finn	Broadway	Winter Garden Theatre
2017	School of Rock	Dewey Finn	Broadway	Winter Garden Theatre
2017	Assassins	Giuseppe Zangara	Off-Broadway Encores!	New York City Center
2018	Beetlejuice	Lawrence Beetlejuice Shoggoth	Pre-Broadway	National Theater
2019–2020	Beetlejuice	Lawrence Beetlejuice Shoggoth	Broadway	Winter Garden Theatre
2021	Goosebumps the Musical: Phantom of the Auditorium	Emile	Original Studio Cast Recording	N/A
2022–2023	Beetlejuice	Lawrence Beetlejuice Shoggoth	Broadway	Marquis Theatre
2023	Lewberger & The Wizard of Friendship	Keith's Dad (One night cameo)	Off-Broadway	Theatre Row
2023	Spamalot	Sir Lancelot / The French Taunter / Knight of Ni / Tim the Enchanter	Regional	Kennedy Center
2023	The Shark Is Broken	Richard Dreyfuss	Broadway	John Golden Theatre
2023	Gutenberg! The Musical!	Producer (One night cameo)	Broadway	James Earl Jones Theatre
2024	Spamalot	Sir Lancelot / The French Taunter / Knight of Ni / Tim the Enchanter	Broadway	St. James Theatre
2024	The Comedy of Errors	Dromio of Syracuse	Regional	Shakespeare Theatre Company
2025–2027	Schmigadoon!	Josh Skinner	Regional	Kennedy Center
2025–2027	Schmigadoon!	Josh Skinner	Broadway	Nederlander Theatre

== Filmography ==
=== Film ===
Year	Title	Role	Notes
1998	The Face	Jacob	Short film
2009	Red Hook	Roy	
2012	Change of Plans	Drew	Short film
2014	The Forrest Boys	Rodney	Short film
2021	Here Today	Justin	
2024	The Union	Gary	

=== Television ===
Year	Title	Role(s)	Notes
2009	Important Things with Demetri Martin	Various characters	2 episodes
2011	Royal Pains	Chic Geek	Episode: "The Shaw/Hank Redemption"
2016	The Special Without Brett Davis	Unknown	Episode: "Mornin USA"
2016	Impractical Jokers	Himself	Episode: "Stage Fright"
2017	SMILF	Jesse	Episode: "A Box of Dunkies & Two Squirts of Maple Syrup"
2018	The Good Fight	Carter Bloom	Episode: "Day 436"
2019	Documentary Now!	Kenny	Episode: "Original Cast Album: Co-Op"
2020	Teen Titans Go!	Betelgeuse (Beetlejuice)	Voice role; episode: "Ghost With the Most"
2020–present	Helluva Boss	Robo Fizz	Recurring voice role
2020–present	Helluva Boss	Fizzarolli	Recurring voice role
2021	Law & Order: Special Victims Unit	Gabe Miller	Episode: "Turn Me on Take Me Private"
2021	Blue Bloods	Ralph Lamont	Episode: "The Common Good"
2022	Dead End: Paranormal Park	Pugsley	Main voice role
2022	Dead End: Paranormal Park	Temeluchus	Main voice role
2022–2023	The Blacklist	Herbie Hambright	Recurring role
2023	Foul Play	Jimmy Pop	Episode: "The True Real Life of Real Life People"
2024–present	Hazbin Hotel	Sir Pentious	Main voice role
2024–present	Hazbin Hotel	Adam	Main voice role

=== Video games ===
Year	Title	Role
2026	There Are No Ghosts at the Grand	Chris David

== Awards and nominations ==
Year	Association	Category	Nominated work	Result
2016	Fred and Adele Astaire Awards	Fred and Adele Astaire Award for Best Male Dancer	School of Rock	Nominated
2016	Outer Critics Circle Award	Outstanding Actor in a Musical	School of Rock	Nominated
2016	Tony Award	Best Actor in a Musical	School of Rock	Nominated
2016	Drama League Award	Distinguished Performance	School of Rock	Nominated
2016	Broadway.com Audience Choice Awards	Favorite Leading Actor in a Musical	School of Rock	Nominated
2016	Broadway.com Audience Choice Awards	Favorite Funny Performance	School of Rock	Nominated
2016	Broadway.com Audience Choice Awards	Favorite Onstage Pair (with Sierra Boggess)	School of Rock	Nominated
2016	Broadway.com Audience Choice Awards	Favorite Breakthrough Performance	School of Rock	Nominated
2019	Tony Award	Best Actor in a Musical	Beetlejuice	Nominated
2019	Drama League Award	Distinguished Performance	Beetlejuice	Nominated
2019	Broadway.com Audience Choice Awards	Favorite Leading Actor in a Musical	Beetlejuice	Nominated
2019	Broadway.com Audience Choice Awards	Favorite Funny Performance	Beetlejuice	Nominated
2024	Broadway.com Audience Choice Awards	Favorite Featured Actor in a Play	The Shark is Broken	Won
2024	Broadway.com Audience Choice Awards	Favorite Funny Performance	The Shark is Broken	Nominated
2024	Broadway.com Audience Choice Awards	Favorite Replacement (Male)	Spamalot	Nominated
2026	Broadway.com Audience Choice Awards	Favorite Leading Actor in a Musical	Schmigadoon!	Nominated
2026	Broadway.com Audience Choice Awards	Favorite Funny Performance	Schmigadoon!	Nominated
2026	Broadway.com Audience Choice Awards	Favorite Funny Pair (with Sara Chase)	Schmigadoon!	Nominated
2026	Astra TV Awards	Best Supporting Voice-Over Performance	Hazbin Hotel	Nominated
