= Reunited (Steven Universe) =

- Steven Universe episodes
- Episode nos.: Season 5 Episodes 23 & 24
- Directed by: Joe Johnston (supervising); Liz Artinian (art)
- Written by: Miki Brewster; Jeff Liu; Katie Mitroff; Paul Villeco
- Story by: Matt Burnett; Ben Levin; Rebecca Sugar; Kat Morris; Joe Johnston; Tom Herpich
- Editing by: Paul Douglas
- Original air date: July 6, 2018
- Running time: 22 minutes

Guest appearances
- Uzo Aduba as Bismuth; Lisa Hannigan as Blue Diamond; Patti LuPone as Yellow Diamond; Erica Luttrell as Sapphire; Toks Olagundoye as Nanefua Pizza; Lo Mutuc (Note: Credited as Charlyne Yi) as Ruby

Episode chronology
← Previous "Made of Honor"	Next → "Legs from Here to Homeworld"

"Reunited" is the 23rd and 24th episode of the fifth season of the American animated television series Steven Universe, and the 151st and 152nd episode of the series overall. A 22-minute double-length special episode, it was directed by Joe Johnston and Liz Artinian, and written and storyboarded by Miki Brewster, Jeff Liu, Katie Mitroff and Paul Villeco from a story by Johnston, Matt Burnett, Ben Levin, Kat Morris, Tom Herpich and series creator Rebecca Sugar. It first aired on July 6, 2018 as the final part of the seventh "StevenBomb", a series of six episodes aired between July 2 and 6.

"Reunited" features the wedding of Ruby and Sapphire, but the celebrations are cut short when Yellow Diamond and Blue Diamond attack the Earth to avenge Pink Diamond's death. The episode merges many storylines developed previously in the series: the true nature of Pink Diamond's death, revealed in "A Single Pale Rose"; the crisis in Ruby and Sapphire's relationship in the aftermath of that revelation; Lapis Lazuli's departure in "Raising the Barn" earlier in the season; and the Cluster, last seen in the season three episode "Gem Drill". It was viewed by 0.974 million people and received critical acclaim. The episode was nominated for a 2019 Emmy Award in the category of Outstanding Short-Format Animated Program; it lost to Love, Death & Robots.

== Plot ==
It is the wedding day of Ruby (Lo Mutuc) and Sapphire (Erica Luttrell), the Crystal Gems that fuse to form Garnet (Estelle). Steven (Zach Callison) helps everyone prepare for the ceremony, singing the song "Let's Only Think About Love", in which he uses the wedding to distract everyone, including himself, from recent traumatic events and revelations. At the wedding, with Steven's friends in attendance, Ruby and Sapphire say their vows: Ruby says Sapphire allows her to see value in herself, and Sapphire explains how Ruby saved her from her destiny and opened up new possibilities. They kiss and fuse back into Garnet.

During the reception, the Gem rulers Blue and Yellow Diamond arrive in their giant arm-shaped spaceships in order to awaken the Cluster, a massive geo-weapon at the planet's core consisting of thousands of Gem shards. Despite Steven's efforts, the Cluster is awakened, manifesting as a giant arm. However, it remains in control of itself and fights Yellow's ship by arm-wrestling it.

Meanwhile, Blue Diamond (Lisa Hannigan) lands on the beach, intending to avenge Pink Diamond's shattering. She ignores Steven's attempt to explain to her that Pink Diamond was never shattered and subdues Steven and the other Gems with her grief-inducing aura. Connie (Grace Rolek) attacks with Rose Quartz's sword, but Blue Diamond stops her and shatters the blade. Garnet is able to distract Blue Diamond long enough for Lapis Lazuli (Jennifer Paz), returning from space, to drop her barn on Blue Diamond, declaring her allegiance to the Crystal Gems. Working together, the Crystal Gems overwhelm Blue Diamond, while the Cluster disables both ships and retreats to rest.

The Diamonds regroup, as Yellow Diamond (Patti LuPone) assists Blue Diamond out of the wreckage and destabilizes Peridot (Shelby Rabara)'s body, reducing her to her gemstone. When Steven tries to step forward to explain that he has Pink Diamond's gemstone, Yellow Diamond steps on him with fury, knocking him unconscious.

Steven awakens outside his body in an abstract psychic plane, where he watches as Lapis is also destabilized. He discovers that, disembodied, he can interact with people's thoughts, and encourages his friends before attempting to speak to the Diamonds. At first, he is unable to get past their auras, but eventually causes them to sense his presence. They proceed to attack him, but his own aura intensifies, and they stop attacking when they recognize the aura to be that of Pink Diamond. Steven reawakens with the Crystal Gems, Greg and the Diamonds standing over him in surprise, as Blue Diamond tearfully says, "It's you. Pink!"

== Production ==
This episode was written and storyboarded by Miki Brewster, Jeff Liu, Katie Mitroff, and Paul Villeco. The art was directed by Liz Artinian, with Joe Johnston as supervising director.

This episode features the wedding of Ruby and Sapphire, their engagement in the episode "The Question" reportedly being the first same-sex engagement in a cartoon. The wedding storyline had been conceived early in the series' history, during the production of Ruby and Sapphire's first appearance in "Jail Break" and at a time before same-sex marriage had been legalized in the United States. After "Reunited" aired, series creator Rebecca Sugar explained that the two characters were designed to be "wholesome" in response to pushback about their relationship, so that "there could only be one reason you could not show this to kids"; their relationship was also intentionally depicted in a way that would receive as little censorship as possible internationally.

Some viewers noted that Ruby and Sapphire's gendered attire was reversed for their wedding; the more traditionally masculine Ruby wears a dress while Sapphire, who is usually seen with a dress, wears a suit. Concept art for these designs has existed since 2016. Sugar based Ruby and Sapphire's relationship on the relationship between herself and her partner, Ian Jones-Quartey, and Sugar came out as non-binary days after the episode was released; Sugar would later clarify that Ruby's dress was a reference to her own gender identity, commenting that "Ruby in a dress is how I feel when I'm in a dress". A wave of Steven Universe merchandise was released following "Reunited", which prominently featured Ruby and Sapphire's wedding. Sugar later noted that the outfits for Ruby and Sapphire were leaked before the episode aired because of a toy fair.

Sugar has spoken about the influence of classic musical films in the episode's writing. The wedding reception interrupted by violence is a plot element borrowed from Fiddler on the Roof, while the barn being dropped on Blue Diamond is a reference to the farmhouse dropped on the Wicked Witch of the East in The Wizard of Oz. Sugar noted that throughout the show's run, Cartoon Network pressured the crew to make Steven the leader of the Crystal Gems, but that they pushed back, with scene to this effect in "Made of Honor" and noted that in Reunited, Garnet becomes the leader of the Crystal Gems once more.

=== Music ===
This episode features the song "For Just One Day Let's Only Think About (Love)", sung by Zach Callison as Steven, along with the rest of the main cast. The song was composed by Rebecca Sugar with Aivi & Surasshu, and was released digitally as a single alongside the episode's broadcast. According to Sugar, the structure and style of the song were influenced by songs from musical films such as For Me and My Gal and A Funny Thing Happened on the Way to the Forum.

== Broadcast and reception ==
=== Viewership ===
"Reunited" premiered on July 6, 2018 on Cartoon Network. Its initial American broadcast was viewed by approximately 0.974 million viewers. It received a Nielsen household rating of 0.28, meaning that it was seen by 0.28% of all households. The special was the fifth and sixth episodes of the seventh StevenBomb event, where a new episode aired every weekday for a week.

=== Critical reception ===
This episode received critical acclaim upon release, particularly regarding the quantity of important events that occurred within a single episode, including Ruby and Sapphire's wedding, Lapis Lazuli's return to Earth and officially joining the Crystal Gems, and the battle between the Gems and the Diamonds. Eric Thurm of The A.V. Club praised the episode, giving it an A−. Thurm felt that the episode was executed in a great way. However, he felt that the first half of the episode was stronger than the second, stating that he enjoyed Garnet's wedding, particularly Sapphire's vows. He also claimed that although the fight scenes in the second half were slightly underwhelming, the episode set up a new era for the show.

Palmer Haasch, reviewing the episode for Polygon, called it one of the show's "best episodes to date", praising its focus on Steven Universe's core themes of family, love, "and healing, wellness, and growth". Also writing for Polygon, Lux Alptraum hailed the episode, and Ruby and Sapphire's relationship more broadly, as an important instantiation of visible queer representation on television.

Entertainment Weekly rated it one of the five best episodes of any animated series of 2018. At the 2019 Creative Arts Emmy Awards, the episode was nominated for Outstanding Short-Format Animated Program.
