= Cry for Help (Steven Universe) =

- Steven Universe episode
- Steven (right) meets Sardonyx, the fusion of Garnet and Pearl.
- Episode no.: Season 2 Episode 11
- Directed by: Ki-Yong Bae (animation); Jin-Hee Park (animation); Jasmin Lai (art); Ian Jones-Quartey (supervising
- Written by: Joe Johnston; Jeff Liu
- Production code: 1031-064
- Original air date: July 13, 2015
- Running time: 11 minutes

Guest appearances
- Alexia Khadime as Sardonyx; Shelby Rabara as Peridot

Episode chronology
← Previous "Chille Tid"	Next → "Keystone Motel"

"Cry for Help" is the eleventh episode of the second season of American animated television series Steven Universe. The episode was written and storyboarded by Joe Johnston and Jeff Liu; it premiered on July 13, 2015, on Cartoon Network and was watched by 1.714 million viewers.

The episode follows Steven and the Gems attempting to destroy a Gem communication hub when TV broadcasts are disrupted by signals emitted by Peridot from the tower. To demolish the tower, Garnet and Pearl fuse into Sardonyx, leaving Amethyst in dismay. However, as the tower keeps getting fixed, Steven and Amethyst are shocked to see who's really behind the repairs.

== Plot ==
While Steven (Zach Callison) and Amethyst (Michaela Dietz) are watching the fictional cartoon Crying Breakfast Friends, the broadcast is interrupted by a transmission from Peridot (Shelby Rabara), an agent of the hostile Gem homeworld who is stranded on Earth and attempting to contact her superiors. Garnet (Estelle) deduces that the signal is coming from the Gem Communication Hub, which the Crystal Gems destroyed in the earlier episode "Coach Steven".

The Crystal Gems travel to the Communication Hub and find the antenna has been rebuilt. Previously, Garnet and Amethyst destroyed the antenna by fusing into Sugilite, but Sugilite's destructive personality got out of control, so Garnet rules out fusing with Amethyst this time. Instead, she asks Pearl (Deedee Magno Hall) to fuse with her.

Pearl is thrilled by the offer, and she and Garnet form Sardonyx (Alexia Khadime), who destroys the Communication Hub while boasting about her intelligence and grace. After defusing, Garnet and Pearl celebrate with Steven while Amethyst sulks, feeling excluded.

The next day, the television broadcast is interrupted again, and the Gems return to the Communication Hub to find it reassembled once more. While Sardonyx disassembles it, Amethyst sings the song "Tower of Mistakes", blaming herself for Sugilite's recklessness.

That night, Steven and Amethyst go to the Communication Hub to catch Peridot in the act of rebuilding it, but are shocked to find Pearl rebuilding it instead. Later, when Garnet and Pearl are about to fuse to break down the antenna a third time, Amethyst and Steven stop them and reveal that they know that it was Pearl who rebuilt it. Pearl confesses that she was just trying to create an excuse for more opportunities to enjoy the emotional thrill of fusing with Garnet. Amethyst comes to Pearl's defense, but Garnet is enraged and disgusted by Pearl's betrayal, and demands that Amethyst fuse with her to destroy the Communication Hub for good.

Sometime later, back home, Steven and Amethyst are watching Crying Breakfast Friends. Garnet is not speaking to Pearl. As the characters on Crying Breakfast Friends forgive each other, Amethyst wistfully remarks that "it sure would be nice if things worked out the way they do in cartoons."

== Production ==
Episodes of Steven Universe are written and storyboarded by a single team. "Cry for Help" was written by Joe Johnston and Jeff Liu, while Ki-Yong Bae and Jin-Hee Park provided animation direction, and Jasmin Lai served as art director.

Sugilite's tower-smashing punch was inspired by the "Twister-Sock Punch" from Popeye and Donkey Kong's "Giant Punch" from Super Smash Bros. Pearl and Garnet's fusion dance was inspired by the choreography of K-pop artist Sunmi, with storyboards timed to the track "Full Moon".

=== Music ===
The episode features the song "Tower of Mistakes", written by Jeff Liu and featuring vocals by Michaela Dietz as Amethyst.

== Broadcast and reception ==
"Cry for Help" premiered on Cartoon Network on July 13, 2015. Its initial American broadcast was viewed by approximately 1.714 million viewers. It received a Nielsen household rating of 0.4, meaning that it was seen by 0.4% of all households. The episode was the first in a "StevenBomb", a programming schedule in which one new episode of Steven Universe airs daily during the regular work week; the following four episodes dealt with the aftermath of the events of this episode, its impact on the characters, and Pearl and Garnet's eventual reconciliation.

The episode received positive attention from critics, particularly for the emotional maturity of the story. Also highlighted was the introduction of Sardonyx and Amethyst's character development. Eric Thurm of The A.V. Club said that the confrontation between Garnet and Pearl was "maybe the single most complex moment of the show to date", calling it "rich, complicated, heartbreaking, and simply human". Vrai Kaiser of The Mary Sue opined that "that Steven Universe has reached that level of writing complexity in a relatively short time span is nothing short of astounding".
