= The Question (Steven Universe) =

- Steven Universe episode
- Title Card
- Episode no.: Season 5 Episode 21
- Directed by: Ki-Young Bae (animation); Eun-Ok Choi (animation); Joe Johnston (supervising); Liz Artinian (art)
- Written by: Miki Brewster; Jeff Liu
- Original air date: July 4, 2018
- Running time: 11 minutes

Guest appearances
- Erica Luttrell as Sapphire; Lo Mutuc (Note: Credited as Charlyne Yi) as Ruby

Episode chronology
← Previous "What's Your Problem"	Next → "Made of Honor"

"The Question" is the 21st episode of the fifth season of the American animated television series Steven Universe. It first aired on July 4, 2018, on Cartoon Network. It was directed by Joe Johnston and Liz Artinian and written and storyboarded by Miki Brewster and Jeff Liu. The episode attracted media attention after it aired because it featured the first same-sex marriage proposal in Western children's animation.

The episode aired as the third episode of a "Stevenbomb", a sequence of five episodes that aired one each day from July 2 to July 6, 2018. In the first episode of the week, "Now We're Only Falling Apart", Ruby and Sapphire's relationship is strained by the revelation that Steven's mother, Rose Quartz, was originally the despot Pink Diamond. In this episode, the two reconcile as Ruby proposes marriage to Sapphire. The wedding itself takes place in the week's fifth episode, "Reunited".

== Plot ==
Steven (Zach Callison) and Amethyst (Michaela Dietz), searching for Ruby (Lo Mutuc), find her eating pizza and reading comic books with Steven's father, Greg (Tom Scharpling). Ruby tells Steven that her current separation from Sapphire is the first time she's really been on her own, free to choose her own path. Steven is distressed that this means Ruby and Sapphire may never fuse back into Garnet, but Greg reminds him that Ruby must make her own decisions about her relationships.

Inspired by a western comic book, Ruby decides to become a lonesome cowboy, "one with the wilderness... not needing nothing from nobody". Amethyst shapeshifts into a horse to help her play the part. Accompanied by Amethyst, Steven, and Greg, Ruby spends the day exploring the open plain, relishing the opportunity to make her own decisions, regardless of how dangerous they are. She sings the song "Ruby Rider", a country song celebrating life on her own.

That night, Steven apologizes to Ruby for pressuring her to return to Sapphire. But Ruby confesses that, as much as she is enjoying the cowboy adventure, she deeply misses Sapphire and is frustrated by her loneliness. Steven convinces Ruby that making her own choices doesn't mean that she and Sapphire need to be separate, but Ruby decides that this time they need to find a way to be together by their own choice, and not for Rose Quartz's sake. Steven, getting an idea, shows Ruby the last page from the western comic, to which she reacts enthusiastically.

When Steven, Amethyst and Ruby return to Steven's house the following morning, Steven sends Sapphire (Erica Luttrell) out to meet Ruby waiting for her on the beach. Sapphire runs down and apologizes to her for doubting their relationship. But Ruby tells her, "Someone else told us we were the answer, but I don't believe that anymore.... At least not until I hear it from you." Kneeling before her, Ruby asks Sapphire to marry her, explaining, "This time, being Garnet will be our decision." Sapphire happily accepts and the two embrace and dance on the beach. The last shot of the episode is the last page of the western comic, depicting the cowboy protagonist marrying his lover.

== Production and music ==
The episode was written and storyboarded by Miki Brewster and Jeff Liu. Liz Artinian was the art director, with Joe Johnston as supervising director.

Series creator Rebecca Sugar described the plotline involving Ruby and Sapphire's engagement as "years in the making"; she told Entertainment Weekly that "years of tireless work... [led] up to this moment," stressing the importance of "tell[ing] LGBTQ+ children that they belong in this world and they deserve to be loved."

This episode features the song "Ruby Rider", sung by Lo Mutac as Ruby. The song was composed by Jeff Liu and Stemage, with lyrics by Liu, and was released digitally as a single alongside the episode's broadcast.

== Broadcast and reception ==
=== Viewership ===
"The Question" premiered July 4, 2018 on Cartoon Network. Its initial broadcast received a Nielsen household rating of 0.15, meaning that it was seen by 0.15% of all households.

=== Critical reception ===
The episode was favorably reviewed by critics. Eric Thurm, writing for The A.V. Club, gave the episode a rating of B+. He especially praised Yi's performance of "Ruby Rider", and wrote that the episode does a good job of exploring the previously underdeveloped character of Ruby, justifying why she might need some time apart from Sapphire, and handling the "nuanced and emotional" character arc. He said that the resolution of Ruby deciding to return to Sapphire after all felt like "a bit of a cop-out" in not exploring the longer-term effects of a breakup, but Ruby's proposal to Sapphire was "sweet and thrilling".

Vrai Kaiser, writing for The Mary Sue, also praised Yi's singing, and her performance of "new and subtler shades of Ruby’s character". Kaiser also noted parallels between "The Question" and the earlier episode "The Answer", which depicted the beginning of Ruby and Sapphire's relationship; and praised the episode's artwork and its normalization of queer relationships.

According to Teen Vogue, Ruby's proposal was enthusiastically received by fans, with many sharing their excitement on social media.

The episode attracted media attention for purportedly featuring the first same-sex marriage proposal in Western animation. Petrana Radulovic, writing for Polygon, described it as "a pivotal moment in... inclusive messaging in pop entertainment" and "a defining moment both within the show and in animated television at large." Entertainment Weekly noted that the episode was one of many instances of Steven Universe "supporting more inclusive storytelling", including featuring queer relationships at a time when they are still rare in animated series.
