= Gem Harvest =

- Steven Universe episode
- Episode no.: Season 4 Episode 8
- Directed by: Hye Sung Park (animation); Ki-Yong Bae (animation); Sue Hong Kim (animation); Ricky Cometa (art); Kat Morris (supervising)
- Written by: Raven M. Molisee; Paul Villeco; Hilary Florido; Lauren Zuke
- Original air date: November 17, 2016
- Running time: 23 minutes

Guest appearance
- Dave Willis as Andy DeMayo

Episode chronology
← Previous "Onion Gang"	Next → "Three Gems and a Baby"

"Gem Harvest" is the eighth episode of the fourth season of the American animated television series Steven Universe. A special double-length episode, it was written and storyboarded by Raven M. Molisee, Paul Villeco, Hilary Florido, and Lauren Zuke. The episode was first broadcast on Cartoon Network on November 17, 2016, and was viewed by 1.385 million viewers.

In this episode, Steven Universe meets his grumpy, intolerant uncle Andy, who is upset with the loss of his family's closeness and traditions, and attempts to make him feel welcome as part of Steven's family of extraterrestrial magical Gems. The episode was controversial among critics for its addition of an apparently bigoted character to the diverse and accepting world of Steven Universe, especially in the context of what they perceived to be a growing influence of bigotry in contemporary politics.

== Plot ==
Steven (Zach Callison) visits Peridot (Shelby Rabara) and Lapis Lazuli (Jennifer Paz), Gems who have fled the Gem Homeworld, at the barn that they have made into their home. Peridot and Lapis have taken up farming, but they are dismayed to learn that vegetables do not come to life walking and talking. Steven, using his power to create sentient plants, licks a pumpkin seed. The next morning, it has come to life as a barking pumpkin-dog, which Peridot and Lapis adopt as a pet.

Just then, a biplane lands near the barn. The pilot (Dave Willis) emerges, ranting indignantly about the modifications Lapis and Peridot have made to the structure. He denounces them as hobos and hippies squatting on his property. Lapis and Peridot prepare to attack him while Steven calls his father, Greg (Tom Scharpling), for help.

When Greg arrives with Garnet (Estelle), Amethyst (Michaela Dietz), and Pearl (Deedee Magno Hall), he introduces the pilot as his cousin, Andy DeMayo. Though delighted to learn Steven is his nephew, Andy is angry at Greg for separating himself from their family, and for allowing "illegal aliens" to live in the barn. He reminisces about the annual family reunions the DeMayos used to hold at the barn, and so Steven offers to prepare a festive dinner to convince Andy to let Lapis and Peridot stay. The Gems begin harvesting vegetables and preparing the meal; but tensions rise between the Gems and Andy when Peridot and Pearl build a stove by disassembling an airplane engine that was a valued memento of Andy's parents.

The Gems leave to buy party supplies, and Andy begins to relax, telling Steven about his love of flying. When the Gems return with a confused assortment of wedding, baby shower, and funeral supplies, Andy takes it in stride. But at dinner, Andy is alienated by the Gems' strangeness and confused by their in-jokes, and when they thank each other for helping prepare dinner, Andy is left out. Feeling excluded, Andy leaves in his plane.

Steven has Lapis fly him up to Andy's plane. In mid-air, Andy tells Steven about his frustration that other members of his family have moved on; Steven tells Andy that he wants to be part of the family and get to know his uncle. When Steven slips and falls off the plane, Andy dives to catch him. As they fly back to the barn, Andy admits that he bears some responsibility himself for losing touch with family. The Gems awkwardly welcome him back, and Greg and Andy reconcile and embrace.

== Production ==
Episodes of Steven Universe are written by their storyboard artists. As a 23-minute episode, "Gem Harvest" had a larger storyboard team than a typical 11-minute episode, including Raven M. Molisee, Paul Villeco, Hilary Florido, and Lauren Zuke. Dave Willis guest-starred in the role of Uncle Andy; some critics noted a similarity between Willis's performance as Andy and his role as Carl Brutananadilewski on Aqua Teen Hunger Force.

== Reception ==
"Gem Harvest" met with a mixed reception from critics. Reviewers noted that the episode's theme, focusing on welcoming a bigoted older relative to a family dinner and helping him learn to accept other ways of life, was timely to the upcoming Thanksgiving holiday; but several found this narrative to be uncomfortable or in bad taste in the context of its broadcast shortly after the 2016 United States presidential election.

Eric Thurm, reviewing the episode for The A.V. Club, gave it a grade of B, calling it "sweet but somewhat lacking". He praised the episode's theme of the flexibility of what family can mean, as well as its successful inclusion of a large cast of characters and the complexity of Greg's relationship with Andy. On the other hand, he describes Andy's character as thinly drawn, and calls the episode "disingenuous" in implying that prejudices such as those Andy exhibits—his contempt for "hippies" and immigrants, and support for "traditional marriage"—can be as easily overcome as the episode portrays. He compared the episode negatively to "Bismuth", the previous double-length special.

Vrai Kaiser, writing for The Mary Sue, disliked the episode. They felt that the episode was inappropriate for a world in which conservative politics such as Andy's were ascendant, finding its narrative of reconciliation unrealistically optimistic. Although they respected the writers' attempt to tackle "larger, darker" thematic issues, they felt the episode "bit off way, way more than it could chew" in attempting to do so.

Writing for ComicsAlliance, Elle Collins and Katie Schenkel found the episode's timing "cringeworthy" and its message "simplistic", finding it hard to sympathize with Andy in the context of contemporary politics; they said the episode would have been better if some of Andy's reactionary attitudes had been omitted. However, they did enjoy the portrayal of Peridot and Lapis's relationship, and appreciated Andy's character development over the course of the episode.

On the other hand, Mey Rude, writing for Autostraddle, reviewed the episode positively. She characterized Andy as a "Trump voter", noting his antipathy to non-traditional families, vegetarians, and "illegal aliens", and valued the episode's narrative for providing hope that such a character could be persuaded to accept the "completely non-nuclear family" of the Gems. Zach Blumenfeld, writing for Paste saw in the episode as "exactly what the country needs right now". Praising the episode for espousing empathy in connecting with people like Andy feeling "mistrust, worry and nostalgia", Blumenfeld wrote that Steven's "hard-headed determination to empathize must become a driving force over the next four years [...] The way forward is to take action, to mitigate the damage that a Trump presidency might do, and, in the long run, to find a way to quell the anger that lifted [Andy]."
