= Mr. Greg =

- Steven Universe episode
- Greg (left), Pearl (center), and Steven perform a song together. The characters' attire is an homage to classic musical film.
- Episode no.: Season 3 Episode 8
- Directed by: Ki-Yong Bae (animation); Jin-Hee Park (animation); Jasmin Lai (art); Joe Johnston (supervising)
- Written by: Joe Johnston; Jeff Liu
- Original air date: July 19, 2016
- Running time: 11 minutes

Episode chronology
← Previous "Drop Beat Dad"	Next → "Too Short to Ride"

"Mr. Greg" is the eighth episode of the third season of American animated television series Steven Universe, which premiered on July 19, 2016, on Cartoon Network. It was written and storyboarded by Joe Johnston and Jeff Liu. The episode was viewed by 1.549 million viewers. It is the series' first fully musical episode, and features seven songs, more than any other Steven Universe episode.

The episode shows Steven traveling to Empire City with Pearl and his father Greg, who received a check for $10 million in the previous episode "Drop Beat Dad" after one of his songs became a success. However, Pearl still heavily resents Greg since Rose, Steven's mother and the love of her life, chose him over her. To improve their relationship, Steven tries to show Pearl and Greg that they have more in common than they think.

== Plot ==
Steven (Zach Callison) and Greg (Tom Scharpling) are in awe to discover that Greg's song "Comet" has been used as the basis of a successful burger commercial jingle ("Like a Burger"). The two debate what they should do with the $10 million Greg received for the jingle, mutually believing the best things in life to be free ("Don't Cost Nothin'"). Eventually, they decide to take a vacation to Empire City, and Steven suggests that Pearl (Deedee Magno Hall) accompany them ("Empire City"). Pearl and Greg are reluctant to vacation together, but Steven is optimistic.

In Empire City, the trio book a stay at Le Hotel, where the staff joins them in a song about the hotel's opulence and the fun they are having there ("Mr. Greg"). Greg asks Pearl to dance with him, but she refuses, abruptly ending the song. Later that night, while Steven and Greg are asleep, Pearl sings about her feelings for Rose Quartz and her jealousy for Rose and Greg's love, expressing her regrets and her inability to move on since Rose ultimately chose Greg and created Steven ("It's Over, Isn't It"). Steven and Greg awaken during the song, and Greg, lamenting that his relationship with Pearl is beyond repair, flees to the hotel bar.

Steven reveals to Pearl that he invited her along so that she and Greg could work out their differences. Getting them together, he plays a song on the piano, urging them to talk to each other about their feelings for Rose ("Both of You"). Once they have discussed their feelings, they are cheered by the hotel staff, and Greg is presented with the bill for their service. The three depart from Empire City; Greg and Pearl chat amiably while Steven happily observes that they are on better terms ("Don't Cost Nothing (Reprise)").

== Production ==
Promotional art for the episode by writer Joe Johnston

Episodes of Steven Universe are written and storyboarded by a single team. "Mr. Greg" was written and storyboarded by Joe Johnston and Jeff Liu, being Johnston's final episode as a storyboarder before he became the show's supervising director full-time, while Ki-Yong Bae and Jin-Hee Park provided animation direction and Jasmin Lai served as art director. The scene during "It's Over, Isn't It?" in which the camera spins around Pearl was inspired by a similar scene during "Crazy World" from the film Victor/Victoria.

The dancing of Shelby Rabara, voice actress for Peridot, provided the audio of Pearl and Steven tap dancing during the song "Mr. Greg".

=== Music ===
The episode is a musical featuring seven songs: "Like a Burger", "Don't Cost Nothing", "Empire City", "Mr. Greg", "It's Over, Isn't It?", "Both of You" and a reprise of "Don't Cost Nothing". "Mr. Greg" was written by Joe Johnston, Ben Levin and Jeff Liu, with Liu playing guitar and Levin playing bass. "It's Over, Isn't It?" and "Both of You" were arranged by Aivi & Surasshu, the music team for the series, and written by series creator Rebecca Sugar, with strings performed by Jeff Ball. Sugar had to rewrite "It's Over, Isn't It?" several times during production, calling it "the hardest song I've written to date".

== Broadcast and reception ==
"Mr. Greg" premiered on July 19, 2016, on Cartoon Network. Its initial American broadcast was viewed by approximately 1.549 million viewers. It received a Nielsen household rating of 0.43, meaning that it was seen by 0.43% of all households. This was the third episode of the "Steven's Summer Adventures" event, where a new episode aired every weekday for four weeks of the summer vacation.

This episode received universal acclaim from critics. Eric Thurm of The A.V. Club, while feeling the episode was "a little on the nose, even for Steven Universe", described it as "delightful" and gave it an A− grade. KK Bracken and Laura B of thegeekiary.com praised the episode for "the catchy music, the bombastic animation, the great one-liners and the hilarious visual humor". ND Medina of iDigitalTimes called the songs in the episode "some of the catchiest tunes this side of Hamilton", and singled out "It's Over, Isn't It?" as "the most magnificently gay thing Steven Universe has done since Ruby and Sapphire got their own episode".

In 2017, the episode was nominated for a Primetime Emmy Award for Outstanding Short Form Animated Program.
