= Say Uncle (Steven Universe) =

- Steven Universe episode
- Steven (right) meets Uncle Grandpa. As explicitly said by Uncle Grandpa who breaks the fourth wall, the episode is non-canon to both series.
- Episode no.: Season 1 Episode 48
- Written by: Joe Johnston; Jeff Liu
- Story by: Matt Burnett; Ben Levin; Rebecca Sugar; Ian Jones-Quartey; Kat Morris
- Production code: 1031-056
- Original air date: April 2, 2015
- Running time: 11 minutes

Guest appearances
- Pete Browngardt as Uncle Grandpa; Eric Bauza as Belly Bag, Narrator; Adam DeVine as Pizza Steve; Kevin Michael Richardson as Mr. Gus

Episode chronology
← Previous "Shirt Club"	Next → "Story for Steven"

"Say Uncle" is an episode of the American animated television series Steven Universe. The episode, written and storyboarded by Joe Johnston and Jeff Liu, is a crossover with Uncle Grandpa, another Cartoon Network series, with the plot being non-canon for both shows. While The A.V. Club described its announcement in February 2015 as "confusing", the episode aired on April 2 in that same year to high critical praise. The episode was watched by 1.926 million viewers. The events of the crossover specials take place during the first season of Steven Universe and during the second season of Uncle Grandpa.

In the episode, Uncle Grandpa tries to help Steven master his shield ability, causing many nonsensical events along the way and making Garnet, Amethyst, and Pearl see him as a threat.

== Plot ==
When Steven (Zach Callison) is frustrated that he is unable to summon his mother's shield, Uncle Grandpa (Pete Browngardt) comes out from an ocean portal to help. Steven, initially confused, is assured of Uncle Grandpa's goodwill after he offers help and reminds Steven that "None of this is canon". Uncle Grandpa initially guesses that Steven has "belly blues" and tries a variety of weapons on Steven to no avail. When Garnet (Estelle), Amethyst (Michaela Dietz), and Pearl (Deedee Magno Hall) see what is going on, they come to attack Uncle Grandpa, but Steven stops them. Belly Bag (Eric Bauza) introduces Uncle Grandpa and his role as "everyone in the world's uncle and grandpa". Despite this, the Gems see him as a threat and prepare to attack. As he and Steven run from them, Uncle Grandpa summons a plot hole from Belly Bag, transporting them to Uncle Grandpa's world.

In his RV, Uncle Grandpa introduces Steven to his friends Pizza Steve (Adam DeVine), Mr. Gus (Kevin Michael Richardson) and Giant Realistic Flying Tiger. Mr. Gus almost reveals the secret to Steven's shield before Pizza Steve enrages him by defacing a drawing he has made, and Steven and Uncle Grandpa are sucked into a giant Belly Bag. The Gems, meanwhile, escape from the plot hole after Garnet literally breaks the fourth wall. They arrive to see Uncle Grandpa, Steven, Lion, and Giant Realistic Flying Tiger having a tea party. Before they can attack Uncle Grandpa, Steven tries to stop them, and finally summons his shield because he cares about Uncle Grandpa, to all their amazement. Steven finds the moral in all this to not attack strangers for what they have to say or their opinions. The Gems all apologize, and Uncle Grandpa leaves on Giant Realistic Flying Tiger, reminding the viewer to "stay weird" and checking Steven off a list of other Cartoon Network protagonists. (Note: The list includes: Dexter and Dee Dee from Dexter's Laboratory, the Powerpuff Girls from the series of the same name, the Eds from Ed, Edd n Eddy, Billy and Mandy from The Grim Adventures of Billy & Mandy, Mac from Foster's Home for Imaginary Friends, Juniper Lee from The Life and Times of Juniper Lee, the SWAT Kats from SWAT Kats: The Radical Squadron, Flapjack from The Marvelous Misadventures of Flapjack, Finn from Adventure Time, and Clarence from the series of the same name.)

The screen at the very end of the episode says "In Loving Memory of Pizza Steve", because Amethyst had eaten him while in the plot hole.

== Production ==
Cartoon Network announced "Say Uncle" in February 2015 during their upfront for that year. A crossover of Steven Universe and Uncle Grandpa, two of their programs, it is an episode of the former show. Kevin Johnson of The A.V. Club described this announcement as "inexplicable" and connecting of "two wildly, tonally-different shows whose only tangible connection is that they're both animated in color". He wrote, in conclusion, that "someone should check into the Cartoon Network Studios and make sure there isn't a gas leak".

"Say Uncle" was produced as the fourth episode of the second season of the series, and was the third episode of the season to air. Chronologically, however, according to producer Ian Jones-Quartey, its events occur late in the show's first season, between the episodes "Shirt Club" and "Story for Steven"; consequently, following an "intended story order" list for the season written by Jones-Quartey, Wikipedia lists it as the 48th episode of Season 1. Joe Johnston and Jeff Liu wrote the episode, which guest stars actors Pete Browngardt, Kevin Michael Richardson and Adam DeVine reprising their respective roles in Uncle Grandpa. Show writer Matt Burnett wrote on Twitter that it was 100 percent canon, but later admitted this to be an April Fools' Day joke. When asked if the episode was canon, Jones-Quartey tweeted “It's up to you and your imagination, cartoons aren't real!” According to Burnett, the episode was the idea of creator Rebecca Sugar.

== Broadcast and reception ==
The episode first aired on Cartoon Network on April 2, 2015, and was watched by 1.926 million viewers in the United States. Cartoon Network promoted it with the launch of Attack the Light!, a Steven Universe mobile game.

The episode received critical acclaim. Sharing a clip of the show on The A.V. Club, Eric Thurm wrote that its announcement caused confusion among fans, "not least because the deeply surreal and ridiculously over-the-top Uncle Grandpa is much weirder than Steven Universe". In spite of this, he graded the episode an A, describing the simple plot as all it needs to introduce Uncle Grandpa to the show. He wrote that this introduction allows the show to break the fourth wall and play around with different styles of animation.
