= List of Steven Universe episodes =

thumbless

Steven Universe is an American animated television series created by Rebecca Sugar for Cartoon Network. The series revolves around Steven Universe (voiced by Zach Callison), who protects his hometown of Beach City alongside Garnet (voiced by Estelle), Amethyst (voiced by Michaela Dietz) and Pearl (voiced by Deedee Magno Hall), three magical alien guardians known as the Crystal Gems. During the original run of the series, episodes of Steven Universe were variously broadcast once a week; in blocks of multiple new episodes in the course of a week, marketed as "Stevenbombs"; or back-to-back as specials with an umbrella title.

During the course of the series, 160 episodes of Steven Universe aired over five seasons, between November 4, 2013, and January 21, 2019. A television film, Steven Universe: The Movie, was released on September 2, 2019, following the fifth and final season. A concluding limited series, Steven Universe Future, premiered on December 7, 2019, and ended on March 27, 2020.

== Series overview ==
Season	Episodes	Originally released	
Season	Episodes	First released	Last released
Pilot		May 21, 2013	
1	53	November 4, 2013	March 12, 2015
2	25	March 13, 2015	January 8, 2016
3	25	May 12, 2016	August 10, 2016
4	25	August 11, 2016	May 11, 2017
5	32	May 29, 2017	January 21, 2019
Film		September 2, 2019	
Future	20	December 7, 2019	March 27, 2020

== Episodes ==
The order and length of the first three seasons is inconsistent between official sources; this list uses the "intended order" of the episodes as specified by co–executive producer Ian Jones-Quartey, which re-orders six episodes from the first two seasons compared to the broadcast order.

=== Pilot (2013) ===
Title	Directed by	Written and storyboarded by	Original release date
"The Time Thing"	Phil Rynda (creative); Sue Mondt (art); Genndy Tartakovsky (timing)	Rebecca Sugar	May 21, 2013 (Note: The pilot was first released online, and the air date shows when the pilot was released online.)
Upon returning from an intergalactic mission, the Crystal Gems—Garnet, Amethyst, and Pearl—have brought a mysterious magical hourglass. Steven Universe, the youngest member of the Crystal Gems, gets his hands on the device and discovers that it has the ability to let him travel back in time in order to make snappy comebacks. However, his actions soon bring about a deadly adversary, with everyone's lives dependent on Steven being able to make a worthwhile comeback.

=== Season 1 (2013–15) ===
26 half-hours (52 episodes) were produced for Season 1; this list includes a 53rd, "Say Uncle," which was produced and aired as part of Season 2, but which in terms of story chronology is placed by Jones-Quartey's list late in Season 1.

Episode premieres initially occurred weekly on Monday nights, but moved to Wednesday nights beginning with the episode "Steven the Sword Fighter," then to Thursday nights beginning with the episode "Coach Steven". The episodes "Open Book", "Shirt Club", and "Story for Steven" were bumped to air during the second season in order to facilitate airing the final 'arc' of season one over five consecutive nights.

Ian Jones-Quartey was the supervising director for each episode, but is uncredited in "Say Uncle".

No. overall	No. in season	Title	Art directed by	Written and storyboarded by	Original release date	Prod. code	U.S. viewers (millions)
1	1	"Gem Glow"	Kevin Dart	Joe Johnston & Jeff Liu	November 4, 2013 (Note: This episode was first released for free on iTunes on October 28, 2013.)	1020-003	1.86
Steven is disappointed that his favorite ice-cream sandwich brand, Cookie Cat, gets taken off the market. He soon cheers up upon discovering that the Gems managed to get hold of some of the last remaining Cookie Cats, which he comes to believe may be the key to activating his gem.
2	2	"Laser Light Cannon"	Kevin Dart	Kat Morris & Rebecca Sugar	November 4, 2013	1020-001	1.86
When a menacing "Red Eye" is about to hit Beach City, the only thing that can destroy it is a Laser Light Cannon that once belonged to Steven's mother, Rose Quartz. Steven and his father, Greg, search through Greg's storage for the cannon.
3	3	"Cheeseburger Backpack"	Kevin Dart	Ian Jones-Quartey & Rebecca Sugar	November 11, 2013	1020-002	1.68
The Crystal Gems take Steven on his first mission: to place a Moon Goddess statue on top of the ruined Lunar Sea Spire. Steven tries to prove he can be useful with the help of his new novelty Cheeseburger Backpack.
4	4	"Together Breakfast"	Kevin Dart	Ian Jones-Quartey, Rebecca Sugar & Paul Villeco	November 11, 2013	1020-004	1.68
Steven's attempt to get the Gems to share his special breakfast sends him on a journey through their ancient Crystal Temple; but when the breakfast absorbs a dangerous artifact, it comes to life and must be defeated.
5	5	"Frybo"	Kevin Dart	Raven M. Molisee & Paul Villeco	November 18, 2013	1020-008	1.29
Steven brings a mascot costume to life with a magical gem shard in order to help his friend Peedee, but it backfires when the mascot goes rogue.
6	6	"Cat Fingers"	Kevin Dart	Kat Morris, Hilary Florido, Ian Jones-Quartey & Rebecca Sugar	November 25, 2013	1020-005	1.71
Trying to master his shapeshifting abilities, Steven turns his fingers into cats, which get out of control.
7	7	"Bubble Buddies"	Kevin Dart	Kat Morris & Aleth Romanillos	December 2, 2013	1020-006	1.61
Steven forms a magic bubble around himself and a girl named Connie to save her from a falling rock, but he has no idea how to make it disappear.
8	8	"Serious Steven"	Kevin Dart	Joe Johnston & Jeff Liu	January 13, 2014	1020-007	1.35
While navigating through an ancient Gem maze, Steven tries to prove to the Gems that he can take the mission seriously.
9	9	"Tiger Millionaire"	Kevin Dart	Raven M. Molisee & Paul Villeco	January 20, 2014	1020-011	1.57
Steven joins an underground wrestling league with Amethyst, who's tired of Garnet and Pearl bringing her down.
10	10	"Steven's Lion"	Kevin Dart & Elle Michalka	Lamar Abrams & Aleth Romanillos	January 27, 2014	1020-012	1.51
Steven befriends a magical lion he finds in the desert during a mission.
11	11	"Arcade Mania"	Kevin Dart	Lamar Abrams, Aleth Romanillos & Luke Weber	February 17, 2014	1020-009	1.17
Steven takes the Gems to the Funland Arcade, where Garnet becomes enchanted by a rhythm game.
12	12	"Giant Woman"	Kevin Dart	Joe Johnston & Jeff Liu	February 24, 2014	1020-010	1.89
Steven encourages Amethyst and Pearl to fuse together into a four-armed "giant woman" named Opal, but Amethyst and Pearl keep quarrelling.
13	13	"So Many Birthdays"	Elle Michalka	Raven M. Molisee & Paul Villeco	March 3, 2014	1020-014	1.17
After learning that the Gems are thousands of years old, Steven throws a party to make up for all the birthdays they've missed, and he begins to worry about what it means to grow up himself.
14	14	"Lars and the Cool Kids"	Elle Michalka	Lamar Abrams & Matt Braly	March 10, 2014	1020-015	1.50
Steven and Lars hang out with the cool kids—Jenny Pizza, Buck Dewey, and Sour Cream—but their teenage shenanigans get them into magical trouble.
15	15	"Onion Trade"	Elle Michalka	Lamar Abrams	March 17, 2014	1020-018	1.79
A toy trade between Steven and Onion escalates into epic proportions.
16	16	"Steven the Sword Fighter"	Elle Michalka	Joe Johnston & Jeff Liu	April 9, 2014	1020-013	1.10
Pearl's attempt to teach Steven the art of sword-fighting using a holographic version of herself goes awry when she gets injured and has to retreat into her gem to heal.
17	17	"Lion 2: The Movie"	Elle Michalka	Joe Johnston & Jeff Liu	April 23, 2014	1020-017	1.57
Steven and Connie try to ride Lion to the movie theater, but Lion instead takes them to a mysterious Gem armory.
18	18	"Beach Party"	Elle Michalka	Lamar Abrams	April 30, 2014	1020-020	1.44
After a battle damages the Fish Stew Pizza sign, the Gems are banned from the restaurant, so Steven throws a cookout on the beachside to mend the relationship between the Pizza family and the Gems.
19	19	"Rose's Room"	Elle Michalka	Joe Johnston & Jeff Liu	May 14, 2014	1020-019	1.55
Steven's desire for some alone time unlocks a room in the temple that answers his every wish.
20	20	"Coach Steven"	Elle Michalka	Raven M. Molisee & Paul Villeco	August 21, 2014 (Note: This episode was first aired on July 14, 2014 in Canada.)	1020-016	1.85
Against Pearl's advice, Steven becomes determined to get stronger after watching Garnet and Amethyst fuse into the mighty (and destructive) Sugilite.
21	21	"Joking Victim"	Elle Michalka	Raven M. Molisee & Paul Villeco	August 28, 2014	1020-024	1.63
When Lars fakes an injury to take a sick day from work, Steven helps Sadie out at the Big Donut, and they pull a prank on Lars to get back at him.
22	22	"Steven and the Stevens"	Elle Michalka	Joe Johnston & Jeff Liu	September 4, 2014	1020-021	2.14
Steven needs a musical partner for an upcoming show, so he uses a time travel device to recruit himself as the perfect bandmate. This episode re-uses the time-travel device from the non-canonical pilot episode.
23	23	"Monster Buddies"	Elle Michalka	Lamar Abrams & Hellen Jo	September 11, 2014	1020-022	2.07
Steven accidentally releases a captured Gem monster from her bubble and attempts to tame her wild form.
24	24	"An Indirect Kiss"	Elle Michalka	Raven M. Molisee & Paul Villeco	September 18, 2014	1020-023	1.73
Steven tells Connie about his mission with the Gems to heal Amethyst when she cracked her gem.
25	25	"Mirror Gem" (Part 1)	Elle Michalka	Raven M. Molisee & Paul Villeco	September 25, 2014	1020-025	2.34
Steven befriends a magical mirror that can mysteriously communicate with him, and ends up freeing its prisoner: Lapis Lazuli, another mysterious Gem.
26	26	"Ocean Gem" (Part 2)	Elle Michalka	Joe Johnston & Jeff Liu	September 25, 2014	1020-026	2.34
Lapis Lazuli disappears after reigniting a past conflict with the three Crystal Gems and takes the ocean with her, leaving Beach City in a panic on the first day of summer. Steven, Connie, Greg, Lion and the Gems go on a mission to confront Lapis and set things right.
27	27	"House Guest"	Elle Michalka	Lamar Abrams & Hellen Jo	October 2, 2014	1026-027	2.00
Left temporarily homeless and with a broken leg after the events of the previous episode, Greg stays in Steven's house while his leg heals and unintentionally interferes with Steven's healing powers.
28	28	"Space Race"	Elle Michalka	Joe Johnston & Jeff Liu	October 9, 2014	1026-028	1.99
Steven, Pearl, and Greg visit Greg's family's barn and work together to build a spaceship so that Pearl can revisit the wonders of the cosmos, but Pearl gets a little carried away.
29	29	"Secret Team"	Elle Michalka	Hilary Florido & Katie Mitroff	October 16, 2014	1026-030	2.46
When they accidentally pop a bubble containing gem shards, Steven forms a secret team with Amethyst and Pearl to retrieve the shards before Garnet finds out. After doing so, Steven wants to keep the secret team going.
30	30	"Island Adventure"	Elle Michalka	Raven M. Molisee & Paul Villeco	October 23, 2014	1026-033	1.53
Steven tries to mend Lars and Sadie's friendship by taking them on vacation to the mysterious Mask Island; but they become stranded there for several days.
31	31	"Keep Beach City Weird"	Elle Michalka	Raven M. Molisee & Paul Villeco	October 30, 2014	1026-029	1.45
Steven is taken in by Ronaldo's conspiracy theories about the paranormal occurrences in Beach City.
32	32	"Fusion Cuisine"	Elle Michalka	Lamar Abrams & Hellen Jo	November 6, 2014	1026-031	1.46
Steven asks the Gems to fuse together into Alexandrite and pretend to be his mother at a dinner with Connie's family.
33	33	"Garnet's Universe"	Elle Michalka	Joe Johnston & Jeff Liu	November 13, 2014	1026-036	1.64
When Garnet returns from a mission, Steven imagines a story about what she did all day.
34	34	"Watermelon Steven"	Elle Michalka	Lamar Abrams & Hellen Jo	November 20, 2014	1026-035	1.83
Steven grows a patch of watermelons shaped like himself, but they soon come to life and attack the people of Beach City and the Crystal Gems.
35	35	"Lion 3: Straight to Video"	Elle Michalka	Joe Johnston, Jeff Liu & Rebecca Sugar	December 4, 2014	1026-032	1.92
Lion keeps lying on Steven's face while he's sleeping, leading Steven to discover a pocket dimension in Lion's mane. This episode was nominated for an Emmy Award for Outstanding Short-Form Animation.
36	36	"Alone Together" (Note: For unknown reasons, Alone Together and Warp Tour were swapped when airing.)	Elle Michalka	Hilary Florido, Katie Mitroff & Rebecca Sugar	January 15, 2015	1026-034	1.67
While practicing how to fuse with the Gems, Steven accidentally fuses with Connie, forming an unprecedented Gem/human fusion named Stevonnie.
37	37	"Warp Tour"	Elle Michalka	Raven M. Molisee & Paul Villeco	January 8, 2015	1026-037	1.94
Steven becomes uneasy after seeing an unknown object traversing a warp stream, despite the Gems' attempts to disprove his claims. They learn that the source of the mysterious objects is Peridot, a Gem from the Gem Homeworld checking up on Earth.
38	38	"The Test"	Elle Michalka	Hilary Florido & Katie Mitroff	January 22, 2015	1026-038	1.94
Steven finds out that the Lunar Sea Spire mission from the third episode was meant to be a test of his ability to join the Gems on missions, so he demands a new test.
39	39	"Future Vision"	Elle Michalka	Lamar Abrams & Hellen Jo	January 29, 2015	1026-039	2.03
Steven learns that Garnet can see into the future and becomes paranoid about the possible dangers around him.
40	40	"On the Run"	Elle Michalka	Joe Johnston & Jeff Liu	February 5, 2015	1026-040	2.08
Steven and Amethyst try out life on the road, and Amethyst reveals her origin to Steven: she was created on Earth as part of the original Gem colonization of the planet.
41	41	"Horror Club"	Elle Michalka	Raven M. Molisee & Paul Villeco	February 12, 2015	1026-041	1.67
Steven goes to the lighthouse to watch scary movies with Ronaldo, Lars, and Sadie.
42	42	"Winter Forecast"	Elle Michalka	Lamar Abrams & Hellen Jo	February 19, 2015	1026-043	2.05
Steven has to take Connie back to her home before a blizzard hits Beach City, and Garnet shows him some future outcomes of this before they leave.
43	43	"Maximum Capacity"	Elle Michalka	Hilary Florido, Katie Mitroff & Rebecca Sugar	February 26, 2015	1026-042	1.97
While cleaning out Greg's storage unit, he and Amethyst are distracted by watching old episodes of their favorite sitcom Li'l Butler.
44	44	"Marble Madness"	Elle Michalka	Joe Johnston & Jeff Liu	March 5, 2015	1026-044	1.92
When droids from space descend towards warp pad zones, Steven and the Gems attempt to find out their purpose.
45	45	"Rose's Scabbard"	Elle Michalka	Raven M. Molisee, Rebecca Sugar & Paul Villeco	March 9, 2015	1026-045	1.22
Pearl takes Steven to a special place that belonged to Rose Quartz after Lion finds the scabbard for Rose's sword.
46	46	"Open Book"	Elle Michalka	Hilary Florido & Katie Mitroff	March 19, 2015	1026-046	1.73
When Connie is upset by the ending of her favorite book series, Steven takes her to Rose's room to attempt to remake the ending.
47	47	"Shirt Club" (Note: Cartoon Network's website initially listed this episode as part of season one, but as of August 2015, it has been labeled as part of season two.)	Elle Michalka	Lamar Abrams & Hellen Jo	April 16, 2015	1026-047	1.42
Steven and Buck make T-shirts featuring Steven's crudely drawn advertisement for Greg's guitar lessons.
48	48	"Say Uncle" (Note: Though it chronologically takes place during season 1, unlike the other bumped episodes from season 1, this episode was produced as part of season 2. Cartoon Network's website identifies it as such.)	Elle Michalka & Jasmin Lai	Joe Johnston & Jeff Liu	April 2, 2015	1031-056	1.93
In this non-canon crossover episode, Uncle Grandpa arrives to aid Steven in unlocking the power of his gem.: Notes: The events of the crossover specials take place during the second season of Uncle Grandpa.
49	49	"Story for Steven"	Elle Michalka	Joe Johnston & Jeff Liu	April 9, 2015	1026-048	2.00
Greg tells Steven the story of how he met Rose Quartz.
50	50	"The Message"	Elle Michalka	Lamar Abrams & Hellen Jo	March 10, 2015	1026-049	1.30
Steven and the Gems need Greg's help to retrieve a message being transmitted through a Gem artifact called a Wailing Stone.
51	51	"Political Power"	Elle Michalka	Hilary Florido & Katie Mitroff	March 11, 2015	1026-050	1.42
After the Gems cause a power outage in Beach City, Steven helps Mayor Dewey control the situation.
52	52	"The Return" (Part 1)	Elle Michalka	Raven M. Molisee & Paul Villeco	March 12, 2015	1026-051	1.70
Steven helps evacuate Beach City in the face of an invasion from the Gem Homeworld by Peridot and the warrior Gem Jasper.
53	53	"Jail Break" (Part 2)	Elle Michalka	Joe Johnston, Jeff Liu & Rebecca Sugar	March 12, 2015	1026-052	1.70
Trapped on the Gem Warship, Steven attempts to rescue the Gems, including two unfamiliar Gems named Ruby and Sapphire, from Peridot and Jasper's clutches.

=== Season 2 (2015–16) ===
Season 2 and Season 3 were produced as one season of 26 half-hours, comprising 49 regular episodes, 1 double-length special, and 6 shorts. When the season was officially split in two after the fact, 26 of the regular episodes and the shorts were aired as "Season 2". This included "Say Uncle," but as previously noted, this list moves that episode to Season 1.

Jasmin Lai is the art director for every episode, with Elle Michalka co-directing "Full Disclosure".

No. overall	No. in season	Title	Supervising direction by	Written and storyboarded by	Original release date	Prod. code	U.S. viewers (millions)
54	1	"Full Disclosure" (Note: Cartoon Network's website lists this episode as part of season one.)	Ian Jones-Quartey	Raven M. Molisee & Paul Villeco	March 13, 2015	1031-053	1.52
Steven tries to avoid Connie so he doesn't have to tell her about his ordeal with the Homeworld Gems from the previous episodes.
55	2	"Joy Ride"	Ian Jones-Quartey	Hilary Florido & Katie Mitroff	March 26, 2015	1031-054	1.34
The cool kids take Steven out on a late-night joyride to lift his spirits, and end up discovering Peridot's escape pod.
56	3	"Love Letters"	Ian Jones-Quartey	Lamar Abrams & Hellen Jo	April 23, 2015	1031-055	1.67
When Jamie the mailman falls in love with Garnet, Steven and Connie must help turn him down gently.
57	4	"Reformed"	Ian Jones-Quartey	Raven M. Molisee & Paul Villeco	April 30, 2015	1031-057	1.39
Amethyst keeps trying to find a new form to regenerate into while she, Steven and Garnet chase after a Gem monster loose in the temple.
58	5	"Sworn to the Sword"	Ian Jones-Quartey	Joe Johnston & Jeff Liu	June 15, 2015	1031-060	1.98
Connie, wanting to protect Steven, takes swordfighting lessons with Pearl.
59	6	"Rising Tides, Crashing Skies"	Ian Jones-Quartey	Lamar Abrams & Hellen Jo	June 16, 2015	1031-059	1.82
Ronaldo investigates the Crystal Gems in a web documentary for his "Keep Beach City Weird" blog.
60	7	"Keeping It Together"	Ian Jones-Quartey	Raven M. Molisee & Paul Villeco	June 17, 2015	1031-061	1.80
While the Crystal Gems chase after Peridot in the Kindergarten, Steven and Garnet discover a dark secret while exploring its inner workings.
61	8	"We Need to Talk"	Ian Jones-Quartey	Hilary Florido, Katie Mitroff & Rebecca Sugar	June 18, 2015	1031-062	1.73
After witnessing Steven and Connie fuse again, Greg explains to them how he learned about fusion from his time with Rose Quartz, hoping to pull it off himself in order to grow closer to her.
62	9	"Chille Tid"	Ian Jones-Quartey	Lamar Abrams & Lauren Zuke	June 19, 2015	1031-063	1.90
Steven is exhausted from searching the ocean for Jasper and Lapis Lazuli's fusion, Malachite, so Garnet has Pearl and Amethyst stay with him for a slumber party. Steven, discovering that he has the power of astral projection, is rattled by recurring dreams of Lapis.
63	10	"Cry for Help"	Ian Jones-Quartey	Joe Johnston & Jeff Liu	July 13, 2015	1031-064	1.71
When TV broadcasts are disrupted by a video signal emitted by Peridot from the Gem communication tower, Garnet chooses to fuse with Pearl into Sardonyx to destroy it, which dismays Amethyst. As the tower keeps being fixed, however, Steven and Amethyst are shocked to discover who's really behind it.
64	11	"Keystone Motel"	Ian Jones-Quartey	Raven M. Molisee, Rebecca Sugar & Paul Villeco	July 14, 2015	1031-065	1.73
While she accompanies Greg and Steven on a road trip to another state and a visit to a motel, Garnet's anger over what Pearl did in the previous episode causes her to split into Ruby and Sapphire.
65	12	"Onion Friend"	Ian Jones-Quartey	Lamar Abrams & Katie Mitroff	July 15, 2015	1031-067	1.83
During a visit to Onion's house, Amethyst rekindles her friendship with his mother, Vidalia, while Onion shows Steven around his room.
66	13	"Historical Friction"	Ian Jones-Quartey	Hilary Florido & Lauren Zuke	July 16, 2015	1031-066	1.88
Steven is asked by Jamie to participate in a play funded by Mayor Dewey about Beach City's founding, with Pearl stepping in to provide a more historically accurate script.
67	14	"Friend Ship"	Ian Jones-Quartey	Joe Johnston & Jeff Liu	July 17, 2015	1031-068	1.65
After the recent events, Pearl wants to redeem herself by capturing Peridot, who then traps the Crystal Gems in an old, abandoned Gem spaceship.
68	15	"Nightmare Hospital"	Ian Jones-Quartey	Raven M. Molisee & Paul Villeco	September 10, 2015	1031-069	1.39
After Connie's mother confiscates Rose's sword, Steven and Connie sneak into the hospital where she works to retrieve it from her.
69	16	"Sadie's Song"	Kat Morris	Raven M. Molisee & Paul Villeco	September 17, 2015	1031-073	1.50
Steven helps Sadie with an act for the annual Beach-a-Palooza talent show.
70	17	"Catch and Release"	Kat Morris	Hilary Florido & Lauren Zuke	September 24, 2015	1031-070	1.39
The Crystal Gems finally capture Peridot, but Steven suspects that she has information that the Crystal Gems need to know and attempts to learn what it is, allowing her to live in his bathroom.
71	18	"When It Rains"	Joe Johnston	Lamar Abrams & Katie Mitroff	October 1, 2015	1031-071	1.36
After Steven explains life on Earth to Peridot, and she experiences her first rainstorm, she decides to tell him about her mission: to locate an experimental Gem creation called the Cluster.
72	19	"Back to the Barn"	Joe Johnston	Joe Johnston & Jeff Liu	October 8, 2015	1031-072	1.59
At the barn, when Peridot and Pearl fight over who will lead the construction of a drill that will take the group to the Cluster's location, Steven suggests they build robots and compete with each other.
73	20	"Too Far"	Kat Morris	Hilary Florido & Lauren Zuke	October 15, 2015 (Note: This episode was first shown during the Steven Universe panel at New York Comic Con on October 10, 2015.)	1031-074	1.39
Peridot gets carried away with Gem gossip and reveals something about Amethyst, unintentionally offending her.
74	21	"The Answer"	Joe Johnston	Lamar Abrams & Katie Mitroff	January 4, 2016	1031-075	1.38
Garnet tells Steven the story of how Ruby and Sapphire first met and joined the Crystal Gems. This episode was nominated for an Emmy Award for Outstanding Short-Form Animation.
75	22	"Steven's Birthday"	Joe Johnston	Lamar Abrams & Katie Mitroff	January 5, 2016	1031-079	1.35
While celebrating his fourteenth birthday with the Gems, Greg, and Connie, Steven takes on a more adult form using his shapeshifting powers. However, this proves harmful to his human body.
76	23	"It Could've Been Great"	Joe Johnston	Joe Johnston & Jeff Liu	January 6, 2016	1031-076	1.45
Steven and the Gems travel to an information archive on the Moon to discover the Cluster's exact location.
77	24	"Message Received"	Kat Morris	Raven M. Molisee & Paul Villeco	January 7, 2016	1031-077	1.39
Steven becomes devastated and mistrustful of Peridot after she steals a communication device from the Moon Base, which she uses to contact her leader, Yellow Diamond.
78	25	"Log Date 7 15 2"	Kat Morris	Hilary Florido & Lauren Zuke	January 8, 2016	1031-078	1.34
While Peridot is in turmoil over what she did in the previous episode, Steven listens to her audio diary and learns how she and Garnet learned to get along during their time at the barn, despite their radical differences.

=== Season 3 (2016) ===
- Season 3 consists of the remaining 23 regular episodes and 1 double-sized episode produced alongside season 2.
- The episodes "Super Watermelon Island", "Gem Drill", "Same Old World", "Barn Mates", and "Hit the Diamond" aired as a four-week special event titled In Too Deep.
- The remaining episodes of the season all aired during another four-week special event titled Summer Adventures.

No. overall	No. in season	Title	Directed by	Written and storyboarded by	Original release date	Prod. code	U.S. viewers (millions)
79	1	"Super Watermelon Island" (Part 1)	Joe Johnston (supervising); Jasmin Lai (art)	Joe Johnston & Jeff Liu	May 12, 2016	1031-080	1.69
Using his astral projection ability, Steven discovers that the Watermelon Stevens have formed their own civilization on Mask Island. However, when he sees Malachite on the island as well, the Gems head into action to fight Malachite as Alexandrite, with the Watermelon Stevens helping them.
80	2	"Gem Drill" (Part 2)	Kat Morris (supervising); Jasmin Lai (art)	Raven M. Molisee & Paul Villeco	May 12, 2016	1031-081	1.69
With the other Gems stranded on Mask Island and the Cluster beginning to show signs of forming, Steven and Peridot drill deep underground alone in order to stop the Cluster and save Earth.
81	3	"Same Old World"	Joe Johnston (supervising); Jasmin Lai (art)	Lamar Abrams & Katie Mitroff	May 19, 2016	1031-083	1.40
Lapis Lazuli has nowhere left to go after being freed from her fusion with Jasper, so Steven shows her the locations Earth has to offer to find her a new home.
82	4	"Barn Mates"	Joe Johnston (supervising); Jasmin Lai (art)	Hilary Florido & Lauren Zuke	May 26, 2016 (Note: This episode was first aired on May 21, 2016 in France.)	1031-082	1.37
Steven tries to help Peridot and Lapis Lazuli resolve their past conflicts and get along at the barn.
83	5	"Hit the Diamond"	Joe Johnston (supervising); Jasmin Lai (art)	Joe Johnston & Jeff Liu	June 2, 2016	1031-084	1.55
A dispatch team of five Ruby soldiers arrives from Homeworld in search of the missing Earth mission leader. To protect Peridot, the Crystal Gems (with Garnet splitting into Ruby and Sapphire again) attempt to get rid of the gullible Rubies by challenging them to a game of baseball.
84	6	"Steven Floats"	Kat Morris (supervising); Jasmin Lai (art)	Paul Villeco	July 18, 2016 (Note: This episode was first aired on May 22, 2016 in France.)	1031-085	1.55
Upon returning home with the Gems, Steven discovers he has the ability to float in the air. However, after jumping too high, he becomes stuck in the sky; the Gems spend all night attempting to get him back on the ground.
85	7	"Drop Beat Dad"	Joe Johnston (supervising); Jasmin Lai (art)	Lamar Abrams & Katie Mitroff	July 18, 2016	1031-087	1.55
Sour Cream's estranged biological father Marty returns to Beach City and aids him in hosting a concert, much to the dismay of his stepdad, Yellowtail.
86	8	"Mr. Greg"	Joe Johnston (supervising); Jasmin Lai (art)	Joe Johnston & Jeff Liu	July 19, 2016	1031-088	1.55
In this special musical episode, after Greg suddenly comes into a great deal of money, he takes Steven and Pearl on a vacation to Empire City. However, Pearl is having trouble letting go of her resentment of Greg's relationship with Rose Quartz. This episode was nominated for an Emmy Award for Outstanding Short-Form Animation.
87	9	"Too Short to Ride"	Kat Morris (supervising); Jasmin Lai (art)	Hilary Florido & Lauren Zuke	July 20, 2016	1031-086	1.41
Steven, Amethyst, and Peridot visit Funland for the day, but Peridot becomes resentful when they use shapeshifting powers as a way to have fun.
88	10	"The New Lars"	Kat Morris (supervising); Jasmin Lai (art)	Raven M. Molisee & Paul Villeco	July 21, 2016	1031-089	1.53
Steven attempts to improve Lars' life when he accidentally ends up in Lars's body due to his astral projection ability.
89	11	"Beach City Drift"	Kat Morris (supervising); Jasmin Lai (art)	Hilary Florido & Lauren Zuke	July 22, 2016	1031-090	1.29
When Steven and Connie run into Kevin, an obnoxious teenager who had harassed Stevonnie in an earlier episode, they fuse again to try to humiliate him by beating him in a car race.
90	12	"Restaurant Wars"	Joe Johnston (supervising); Jasmin Lai (art)	Lamar Abrams & Katie Mitroff	July 25, 2016	1031-091	1.51
When Steven accidentally re-ignites an old feud between restaurant owners Mr. Fryman and Kofi Pizza, it is up to Steven and the restaurant owners' children to try to stop the feud.
91	13	"Kiki's Pizza Delivery Service"	Joe Johnston (supervising); Jasmin Lai (art)	Colin Howard & Jeff Liu	July 26, 2016	1031-092	1.31
Kiki has been having nightmares due to being overworked at Fish Stew Pizza when her sister skips work, so Steven helps by using his astral projection to go into Kiki's dreams.
92	14	"Monster Reunion"	Kat Morris (supervising); Jasmin Lai (art)	Raven M. Molisee & Paul Villeco	July 27, 2016	1031-093	1.38
When Steven's healing powers suddenly return, he re-releases the Centipeetle and attempts to heal her. He can't fully cure her corruption, but he learns from her about her history as a Homeworld officer abandoned on Earth at the end of the war.
93	15	"Alone at Sea"	Kat Morris (supervising); Jasmin Lai (art)	Hilary Florido, Kat Morris & Rebecca Sugar	July 28, 2016	1031-094	1.32
Steven and Greg take Lapis Lazuli on a boat ride to help her recover from her trauma. However, Jasper follows them and confronts Lapis, seeking to fuse into Malachite again.
94	16	"Greg the Babysitter"	Joe Johnston (supervising); Jasmin Lai (art)	Lamar Abrams & Katie Mitroff	July 29, 2016	1031-095	1.31
When Steven asks Greg how he started working at the car wash, Greg tells Steven about a day he and Rose spent babysitting Sour Cream for Vidalia.
95	17	"Gem Hunt"	Joe Johnston (supervising); Jasmin Lai (art)	Colin Howard & Jeff Liu	August 1, 2016	1031-096	1.64
Connie goes on her first mission with Steven and Pearl to find a corrupted Gem monster in the Great North, only to find two monsters being targeted by Jasper.
96	18	"Crack the Whip"	Kat Morris (supervising); Jasmin Lai (art)	Raven M. Molisee & Paul Villeco	August 2, 2016	1031-097	1.90
When Garnet and Pearl return to the Great North to look for Jasper, Amethyst is put in charge of Steven and Connie. They continue their battle training together and try to have a fun day in Beach City, but are interrupted by the reappearance of Jasper.
97	19	"Steven vs. Amethyst"	Kat Morris (supervising); Jasmin Lai (art)	Hilary Florido & Lauren Zuke	August 3, 2016	1031-098	1.74
Following the events of the previous episode, Amethyst's self-esteem has hit rock bottom. With Steven's rising power, Amethyst begins to suspect that she is now the weakest Gem on the team. This leads Steven and Amethyst to engage in a duel to see who really is the weakest Gem.
98	20	"Bismuth"	Joe Johnston (supervising); Jasmin Lai (art)	Lamar Abrams, Colin Howard, Jeff Liu & Katie Mitroff	August 4, 2016	1031-099	2.15
99 (Note: This episode was advertised as the show's 100th episode, as the second season shorts take up a production code.)	21	"Bismuth"	Joe Johnston (supervising); Jasmin Lai (art)	Lamar Abrams, Colin Howard, Jeff Liu & Katie Mitroff	August 4, 2016	1031-100	2.15
Bismuth, one of the original Crystal Gems, is accidentally freed by Steven from a bubble inside Lion's mane. She is welcomed back with open arms by Pearl and Garnet, while Amethyst quickly warms up to her company. However, Steven soon notices that Bismuth's outlook on the rebellion is radically different from the other Gems' when she shows eagerness to re-ignite the Gem War with an unethical secret weapon.
100	22	"Beta" (Part 1)	Kat Morris (supervising); Ricky Cometa (art)	Hilary Florido & Lauren Zuke	August 8, 2016 (Note: This episode was first aired on August 5, 2016 in Canada.)	1031-101	1.99
With Amethyst obsessing over her loss to Jasper, Steven takes her to visit Peridot and Lapis Lazuli at the barn. Peridot and Lapis show off their attempts at creating art (which they call "meepmorps"). When that fails to cheer Amethyst up, Peridot takes her and Steven to Jasper's birthplace, a heavily rushed and poorly-made Kindergarten, where they discover Jasper is the only perfectly-formed Gem made at that site.
101	23	"Earthlings" (Part 2)	Kat Morris (supervising); Ricky Cometa (art)	Raven M. Molisee & Paul Villeco	August 8, 2016	1031-102	1.99
Amethyst fights Jasper but cannot get the upper hand until, in a moment of commiseration with Steven, she fuses with him into Smoky Quartz. Jasper's rash decision to retaliate by fusing with a corrupted Gem results in her being corrupted herself.
102	24	"Back to the Moon"	Joe Johnston (supervising); Ricky Cometa (art)	Lamar Abrams & Katie Mitroff	August 9, 2016	1031-103	1.45
The dispatch team of Rubies has returned to the barn still searching for Jasper. To try to get rid of them once again, Amethyst impersonates Jasper, but things go awry when the Rubies take her and the other Crystal Gems to contact Yellow Diamond at the Moon Base. While there, Steven learns a shocking fact about his mother, Rose Quartz.
103	25	"Bubbled"	Joe Johnston (supervising); Ricky Cometa (art)	Colin Howard & Jeff Liu	August 10, 2016	1031-104	1.57
After being sucked out of the Moon Base's airlock with the Rubies, bubbling himself to safely float through space, Steven has a life-and-death encounter with the murderous Ruby he nicknamed Eyeball.

=== Season 4 (2016–17) ===
- Season 4 was initially ordered together with Season 5, as a set of 26 half-hours, but the two were split into separate seasons during production. Season 4 consists of 13 half-hours (23 regular episodes, 1 double-length special, and 5 shorts).
- The episodes "Kindergarten Kid" and "Know Your Fusion" were the last two episodes to air during a four-week special event titled Summer Adventures.
- "Steven's Dream", "Adventures in Light Distortion", "Gem Heist", "The Zoo", and "That Will Be All" aired as a four-night special event titled Out of This World.
- Episode premieres moved to Fridays beginning with the episode "The New Crystal Gems".

No. overall	No. in season	Title	Directed by	Written and storyboarded by	Original release date	Prod. code	U.S. viewers (millions)
104	1	"Kindergarten Kid"	Kat Morris (supervising); Ricky Cometa (art)	Raven M. Molisee & Paul Villeco	August 11, 2016	1040-105	1.32
In an episode described as a homage to Warner Bros.' Road Runner cartoons, Steven and Peridot are determined to catch a fast, elusive Gem monster.
105	2	"Know Your Fusion"	Kat Morris (supervising); Ricky Cometa (art)	Hilary Florido & Lauren Zuke	August 12, 2016	1040-106	1.35
When Steven and Amethyst introduce Smoky Quartz to Garnet and Pearl, they fuse into Sardonyx and interview Smoky Quartz about what makes them special.
106	3	"Buddy's Book"	Joe Johnston (supervising); Ricky Cometa (art)	Lamar Abrams & Katie Mitroff	August 18, 2016	1040-107	1.37
When Connie takes Steven to the Public Library, he discovers an old journal by William Dewey's first mate Buddy, which chronicles his visits to various Gem locations.
107	4	"Mindful Education"	Joe Johnston (supervising); Ricky Cometa (art)	Takafumi Hori, Colin Howard & Jeff Liu	August 25, 2016	1040-108	1.33
Steven and Connie continue their combat training, and practice fighting while fused as Stevonnie. However, when overwhelming guilt from both Steven and Connie over past events gets in their way, Garnet helps them find inner peace.
108	5	"Future Boy Zoltron"	Kat Morris (supervising); Ricky Cometa (art)	Raven M. Molisee & Paul Villeco	September 1, 2016	1040-109	1.36
After accidentally breaking an old fortune-telling machine at Funland, Steven decides to take its place and tell people's futures. While he initially has fun, he eventually meets a mysterious man who seems to only have depressing futures.
109	6	"Last One Out of Beach City"	Kat Morris (supervising); Ricky Cometa (art)	Hilary Florido & Lauren Zuke	September 8, 2016	1040-110	1.31
Pearl offers to go with Steven and Amethyst to a rock show, deciding to get in touch with her rebellious side whilst trying to impress a woman who looks similar to Rose.
110	7	"Onion Gang"	Joe Johnston (supervising); Ricky Cometa (art)	Lamar Abrams & Katie Mitroff	September 15, 2016	1040-111	1.26
Onion brings Steven into the woods to introduce him to his friends and have a fun day.
111	8	"Gem Harvest"	Kat Morris (supervising); Ricky Cometa (art)	Hilary Florido, Raven M. Molisee, Paul Villeco & Lauren Zuke	November 17, 2016	1040-113	1.39
112	9	"Gem Harvest"	Kat Morris (supervising); Ricky Cometa (art)	Hilary Florido, Raven M. Molisee, Paul Villeco & Lauren Zuke	November 17, 2016	1040-114	1.39
When Steven visits Lapis and Peridot at the barn, they get an unexpected visit from Greg's grumpy cousin Andy. To get to know his uncle and make him feel at home, Steven attempts to host a family dinner with Andy, Greg, and the Gems.
113	10	"Three Gems and a Baby"	Joe Johnston (supervising); Ricky Cometa (art)	Lamar Abrams & Katie Mitroff	December 1, 2016	1040-115	1.29
Greg tells Steven about his first winter as a baby: when Steven was only a few months old, the Gems were still struggling to understand that Rose Quartz had given up her form to allow Steven to be born and wasn't coming back.
114	11	"Steven's Dream"	Joe Johnston (supervising); Ricky Cometa (art)	Colin Howard & Jeff Liu	January 30, 2017 (Note: This episode was first released online on January 2, 2017.)	1040-116	1.36
Steven begins to have a strange dream that causes him to cry, which he quickly realizes is related to Pink Diamond. When he asks the Gems to give him information about Pink Diamond, they refuse to give any, so Steven and Greg travel to Korea to find the truth themselves.
115	12	"Adventures in Light Distortion"	Kat Morris (supervising); Ricky Cometa (art)	Raven M. Molisee & Paul Villeco (Note: The accidental app release of the episode misattributed the writing and storyboards to Hilary Florido and Lauren Zuke.)	January 30, 2017 (Note: This episode was accidentally released on the Cartoon Network app and website on January 2, 2017. It was then removed the following day.)	1040-117	1.36
After Greg is abducted by Blue Diamond, Steven and the Gems rush off into space with the Rubies' ship to rescue him. Faster-than-light travel has unexpected effects on the Gems' bodies, and in Steven's haste, he puts himself and the Gems in danger.
116	13	"Gem Heist"	Kat Morris (supervising); Ricky Cometa (art)	Hilary Florido & Lauren Zuke	January 31, 2017	1040-118	1.25
The Gems reach a space station that once belonged to Pink Diamond, and sneak in to rescue Greg, but in order to do so, they must play the roles they were made for, so as not to arouse suspicion.
117	14	"The Zoo"	Joe Johnston (supervising); Ricky Cometa & Elle Michalka (art)	Lamar Abrams & Katie Mitroff	February 1, 2017	1040-119	1.23
Steven finds Greg in Pink Diamond's "Human Zoo", and tries to look for a way out. This proves easier said than done as the humans there are guided through a strictly scheduled and regimented life.
118	15	"That Will Be All"	Joe Johnston (supervising); Ricky Cometa & Elle Michalka (art)	Colin Howard, Joe Johnston & Rebecca Sugar	February 2, 2017	1040-120	1.15
While Blue Diamond and Yellow Diamond argue over their diverging ways of coping with Pink Diamond's death, Steven, Greg and the Crystal Gems attempt to escape the space station before they are discovered.
119	16	"The New Crystal Gems"	Kat Morris (supervising); Ricky Cometa (art)	Raven M. Molisee & Paul Villeco	February 10, 2017	1040-121	1.06
Connie tells Steven the story of how she, Peridot, and Lapis attempted to take the Crystal Gems' places as the protectors of Beach City while he was in space.
120	17	"Storm in the Room"	Joe Johnston (supervising); Ricky Cometa (art)	Colin Howard & Jeff Liu	February 17, 2017	1040-124	1.02
Steven uses his room in the temple to create a simulated image of Rose Quartz in order to try to experience what it would be like to know his mother. He ends up confronting her with his troubled feelings about her complex legacy and her choice to create him.
121	18	"Rocknaldo"	Kat Morris (supervising); Ricky Cometa (art)	Hilary Florido & Lauren Zuke	February 24, 2017	1040-122	1.10
Ronaldo decides to join the Crystal Gems. However, once Steven lets him join the team, Ronaldo's self-centered attitude begins to try Steven's patience.
122	19	"Tiger Philanthropist"	Joe Johnston (supervising); Ricky Cometa (art)	Lamar Abrams & Katie Mitroff	March 3, 2017	1040-123	0.90
When Amethyst quits wrestling at the abandoned warehouse, Steven continues doing so himself as Tiger Philanthropist. However, Steven soon begins to doubt the point of wrestling when the audience doesn't take to his new persona.
123	20	"Room for Ruby"	Kat Morris (supervising); Ricky Cometa (art)	Raven M. Molisee & Lauren Zuke	March 10, 2017	1040-125	0.95
"Navy", one of the Rubies who came to Earth to find Jasper, crashes on Earth and is welcomed in by Steven to be a Crystal Gem. However, Lapis Lazuli does not trust Navy's overly optimistic nature, knowing of Navy's previous encounters with the Crystal Gems.
124	21	"Lion 4: Alternate Ending"	Kat Morris (supervising); Elle Michalka (art)	Hilary Florido & Paul Villeco	May 8, 2017 (Note: This episode was first released online on May 5, 2017.)	1040-126	1.01
Steven tries to search for secret messages Rose may have left him about his "magical destiny". Lion eventually leads him to a tape—but it's just an alternate version of the message from Rose he's already seen.
125	22	"Doug Out"	Joe Johnston (supervising); Elle Michalka (art)	Lamar Abrams & Katie Mitroff	May 9, 2017	1040-127	0.96
Connie's father, Doug, investigates a break-in at Funland. He invites Steven and Connie to join him to stake out the amusement park.
126	23	"The Good Lars"	Joe Johnston (supervising); Elle Michalka (art)	Colin Howard & Jeff Liu	May 10, 2017	1040-128	0.95
The Cool Kids invite Steven, Lars and Sadie to a potluck. Steven and Sadie encourage Lars to bake a cake for the party, but Lars is insecure about revealing his baking skills.
127	24	"Are You My Dad?" (Part 1)	Kat Morris (supervising); Elle Michalka (art)	Raven M. Molisee & Lauren Zuke	May 11, 2017	1040-129	1.14
Lars, Sadie, Onion and Jamie have mysteriously disappeared. While investigating the mystery, Steven comes across an unfamiliar Gem, who keeps asking "Are you my dad?".
128	25	"I Am My Mom" (Part 2)	Kat Morris (supervising); Elle Michalka (art)	Hilary Florido & Paul Villeco	May 11, 2017	1040-130	1.14
Steven and the Gems race to rescue all of Steven's friends from Aquamarine and Topaz, and find out the horrifying truth behind their actions, but as the stakes keep rising, Steven must make the most difficult decision of his life.

=== Season 5 (2017–19) ===
- Season 5 consists of the remaining 13 half-hours ordered alongside Season 4, plus 3 additional half-hours ordered after it was decided to bring the series to an end, to conclude the story. Together, they comprise 26 regular episodes, 1 double-length special, and 1 quadruple-length finale.
- The episodes "Stuck Together", "The Trial", "Off Colors", and "Lars' Head" aired together as a one-hour special, under the umbrella title Wanted.
- The episodes "Lars of the Stars" and "Jungle Moon" aired together as a half-hour special, under the umbrella title Stranded.
- Episode premieres moved to Monday nights beginning with the episode "Your Mother and Mine".
- The episodes "Now We're Only Falling Apart", "What's Your Problem", "The Question", "Made of Honor", and "Reunited" aired as a five-night special event titled Heart of the Crystal Gems.
- The episodes "Legs from Here to Homeworld", "Familiar", "Together Alone", "Escapism", and "Change Your Mind" aired as a five-week special event titled Diamond Days.
- Each episode was art directed by Liz Artinian.

No. overall	No. in season	Title	Supervising direction by	Written and storyboarded by	Original release date	Prod. code	U.S. viewers (millions)
129	1	"Stuck Together" (Part 1)	Kat Morris	Lauren Zuke	May 29, 2017 (Note: This episode was first released online on May 10, 2017.)	1053-133	1.53
Steven and Lars, stuck inside Topaz, try to look for a way to escape the Homeworld-bound ship. Their heartfelt conversation commiserating over their plight earns them Topaz's sympathy.
130	2	"The Trial" (Part 2)	Joe Johnston	Katie Mitroff & Paul Villeco	May 29, 2017	1053-134	1.53
Steven is put on trial before Blue and Yellow Diamond for Rose Quartz's assassination of Pink Diamond. During the trial, Steven's attorney, a Zircon, analyses the evidence and argues that the public account of Pink Diamond's death doesn't make sense, and suggests that the true facts of the case have been covered up.
131	3	"Off Colors" (Part 3)	Joe Johnston	Lamar Abrams & Jeff Liu	May 29, 2017	1053-131	1.52
After escaping from the Diamonds, Steven and Lars encounter and befriend the "off-colors", a group of "defective" Gems who live in hiding from Gem society.
132	4	"Lars' Head" (Part 4)	Kat Morris	Jeff Liu & Madeline Queripel	May 29, 2017	1053-132	1.52
After Steven brings Lars back to life with his healing powers, he discovers that Lars now shares the same powers as Lion. When Steven realizes that he can use Lars's hair to teleport himself back to Earth (via Lion's mane), he and Lars must make a difficult choice.
133	5	"Dewey Wins"	Joe Johnston	Lamar Abrams & Jeff Liu	December 15, 2017 (Note: This episode was first released on the Cartoon Network app and website on November 10, 2017.)	1053-135	0.85
Connie becomes upset with Steven following his return from Homeworld and refuses to talk to him. Feeling dejected, he decides to help Bill Dewey with his rather hopeless re-election campaign for mayor against Nanefua Pizza.
134	6	"Gemcation"	Kat Morris	Madeline Queripel & Lauren Zuke	December 15, 2017	1053-137	0.85
As Steven remains depressed over Connie's silence, Greg and the Gems misinterpret his sadness and take him to a ranch house for a vacation to cheer him up. The vacation just puts Steven more on edge, until he eventually tells Greg what it is he's upset about.
135	7	"Raising the Barn"	Kat Morris	Danny Kilgore & Hilary Florido	December 22, 2017	1053-136	0.89
When Lapis and Peridot learn what happened to Steven on Homeworld, Lapis wants to flee Earth to avoid getting caught up in another Gem war. However, Peridot wants to stay on Earth to protect it and has a hard time trying to tell Lapis how she feels.
136	8	"Back to the Kindergarten"	Joe Johnston	Katie Mitroff & Paul Villeco	December 22, 2017	1053-138	0.89
With Peridot upset over Lapis leaving Earth, Steven and Amethyst decide to help her cheer up by attempting to plant flowers at the utterly barren Kindergarten.
137	9	"Sadie Killer"	Joe Johnston	Lamar Abrams & Jeff Liu	December 29, 2017	1053-139	0.77
Steven and the Cool Kids start a band, but they have trouble finding their sound. They decide to recruit Sadie, who writes a dark song about her frustrating job at the Big Donut; but that same job keeps her from actually participating in the band.
138	10	"Kevin Party"	Kat Morris	Danny Kilgore & Hilary Florido	December 29, 2017	1053-140	0.77
Kevin is throwing a party, and invites Steven only so he can show up as Stevonnie. Steven doesn't want to go at first, but changes his mind when Kevin reveals that Connie will be there. When they see each other, Kevin decides to help Steven get his "ex" back so they can fuse.
139	11	"Lars of the Stars" (Part 1)	Kat Morris	Lamar Abrams & Lauren Zuke	January 5, 2018	1053-141	1.11
Steven and Connie travel through Lion's mane to visit Lars. When they reach the other side, they discover that Lars and the Off-Color Gems have stolen a spaceship from Emerald and are now on the run from their pursuers.
140	12	"Jungle Moon" (Part 2)	Joe Johnston	Miki Brewster & Jeff Liu	January 5, 2018	1053-143	1.11
Stevonnie crash-lands in a jungle on an alien moon and, unable to contact Lars, must fend for themself. They discover that the moon houses an abandoned Gem base and orbits a former Gem colony, and have a strange dream involving Yellow Diamond and Pink Diamond. Note: This episode was nominated for an Emmy Award for Outstanding Short-Form Animation. Background painter Patrick Bryson won an Emmy for Outstanding Individual Achievement In Animation for his work on this episode.
141	13	"Your Mother and Mine"	Joe Johnston	Katie Mitroff & Paul Villeco	April 9, 2018 (Note: This episode was first released on the Cartoon Network app and website on March 26, 2018.)	1053-142	0.77
Steven brings Garnet to meet Lars and his off-color crew. The Off-Colors' beliefs about Rose Quartz have been skewed by Homeworld propaganda, so Garnet tells them the history of Rose's rebellion from the Crystal Gems' perspective.
142	14	"The Big Show"	Kat Morris	Danny Kilgore & Hilary Florido	April 16, 2018	1053-144	0.56
In this documentary-style episode, Steven records the rise of Sadie's new band, Sadie Killer and the Suspects. The band hires Greg as their manager, who hooks them up with producer Sunshine Justice for a performance in Empire City, though Sadie worries about her mother getting in the way.
143	15	"Pool Hopping"	Joe Johnston	Joe Johnston, Katie Mitroff & Paul Villeco	April 23, 2018	1053-146	0.54
Garnet spends a day trying to behave unpredictably, attempting to train her future vision to account for the unexpected. When she and Steven eventually discover some homeless kittens, Garnet admits how lost and stressed she feels when she doesn't know what the future holds.
144	16	"Letters to Lars"	Kat Morris	Lamar Abrams & Colin Howard	April 30, 2018	1053-145	0.40
Lars receives a letter from Steven updating him about the current goings-on in Beach City. While the town and its population are changing, the now-former mayor Bill Dewey is having trouble trying to find his place in the new status quo.
145	17	"Can't Go Back" (Part 1)	Joe Johnston	Miki Brewster & Jeff Liu	May 7, 2018	1053-147	0.74
After Ronaldo sees Lapis's barn on the moon, Steven goes up there to try to persuade her to return to Earth. He almost convinces her, but ends up scaring her away after experiencing another dream about Pink Diamond.
146	18	"A Single Pale Rose" (Part 2)	Kat Morris	Danny Kilgore & Hilary Florido	May 7, 2018	1053-148	0.74
Steven confronts Pearl about the shattering of Pink Diamond, but she can't answer his questions. But when Pearl asks him to venture inside her gem to retrieve her cell phone, Steven discovers the secret that Pearl swore to keep long ago.
147	19	"Now We're Only Falling Apart"	Kat Morris	Lamar Abrams & Christine Liu	July 2, 2018	1053-149	0.84
After finding out that Rose Quartz was actually Pink Diamond, Garnet unfuses and Sapphire runs off, devastated. To try and calm her down, Steven and Pearl go after her and tell her the story of how Pink Diamond became Rose Quartz.
148	20	"What's Your Problem"	Joe Johnston	Katie Mitroff & Paul Villeco	July 3, 2018	1053-150	0.93
With Ruby missing, Steven and Amethyst go looking for her. Steven takes the search seriously while Amethyst goofs off, but her reasons behind it soon become clear.
149	21	"The Question"	Joe Johnston	Miki Brewster & Jeff Liu	July 4, 2018	1053-151	0.71
Ruby decides to explore her own life separate from Sapphire, and has a Wild West adventure as a lonesome cowboy with the help of Steven, Amethyst, and Greg. Although she has fun, she still misses Sapphire, and she returns to her with an important question to ask.
150	22	"Made of Honor"	Kat Morris	Lamar Abrams & Christine Liu	July 5, 2018	1053-152	0.83
As Ruby and Sapphire plan their wedding, Sapphire wishes that their friends from the war could be there to see it. Steven releases Bismuth, catches her up on everything, and tries to convince her to go to the wedding.
151	23	"Reunited"	Joe Johnston	Miki Brewster, Jeff Liu, Katie Mitroff & Paul Villeco	July 6, 2018	1053-154	0.97
152	24	"Reunited"	Joe Johnston	Miki Brewster, Jeff Liu, Katie Mitroff & Paul Villeco	July 6, 2018	1053-155	0.97
The wedding of Ruby and Sapphire, with the Gems and several Beach City citizens in attendance, goes without a hitch and Garnet reforms. However, during the reception, Blue and Yellow Diamond arrive and awaken the Cluster. While the Crystal Gems, with the Cluster's support, fight the Diamonds, Steven tries to get them to listen to the truth about Pink Diamond. This episode was nominated for an Emmy Award for Outstanding Short-Form Animation.
153	25	"Legs from Here to Homeworld"	Kat Morris	Danny Kilgore, Hilary Florido & Tom Herpich	December 17, 2018 (Note: This episode was first shown during the Steven Universe panel at San Diego Comic-Con on July 21, 2018. It was then released on the Cartoon Network app and website the following day.)	1053-153	0.63
Steven tells Blue and Yellow Diamond that their final attack on the Earth corrupted the remaining Gems on the planet, instead of destroying them outright as intended. The three together attempt to cure Centipeetle's corruption, and almost succeed. To try to finish the job and cure all the corrupted Gems, Blue, Yellow, and the Crystal Gems travel to Homeworld to seek White Diamond's help.
154	26	"Familiar"	Kat Morris	Danny Kilgore, Hilary Florido, Tom Herpich & Pendleton Ward	December 24, 2018	1053-156	0.74
Steven struggles to adapt to life as a Diamond. With the help of Pearl, Yellow Diamond and Blue Diamond, he hopes to find out more about Pink Diamond to familiarize himself with his new life on Homeworld. Along with that, he tries to find a way to get all four Diamonds together to finally heal the corrupted Gems.
155	27	"Together Alone"	Kat Morris	Lamar Abrams, Tom Herpich & Christine Liu	December 31, 2018	1053-157	0.65
Steven and the gang plan a ball for all of Homeworld in order to get all four Diamonds together in one room and possibly discuss curing Gem corruption. Steven is frustrated when White Diamond doesn't show up, and matters go from bad to worse.
156	28	"Escapism"	Joe Johnston	Joe Johnston & Adam Muto	January 7, 2019	1053-158	0.67
With Steven and Connie trapped in a prison tower, and the other Crystal Gems on Homeworld poofed, Steven tries using his psychic powers to contact Bismuth for aid. However, he ends up in the body of a Watermelon Steven on Mask Island, and has to find a way to get to them.
157	29	"Change Your Mind" (Note: An alternate title used for this episode is "Steven Universe: Battle of Heart and Mind".)	Joe Johnston & Kat Morris	Lamar Abrams, Miki Brewster, Danny Kilgore, Hilary Florido, Joe Johnston, Ian Jones-Quartey, Christine Liu, Jeff Liu, Katie Mitroff, Kat Morris, Rebecca Sugar & Paul Villeco	January 21, 2019	1053-159	0.99
158	30	"Change Your Mind"	Joe Johnston & Kat Morris	Lamar Abrams, Miki Brewster, Danny Kilgore, Hilary Florido, Joe Johnston, Ian Jones-Quartey, Christine Liu, Jeff Liu, Katie Mitroff, Kat Morris, Rebecca Sugar & Paul Villeco	January 21, 2019	1053-160	0.99
159	31	"Change Your Mind"	Joe Johnston & Kat Morris	Lamar Abrams, Miki Brewster, Danny Kilgore, Hilary Florido, Joe Johnston, Ian Jones-Quartey, Christine Liu, Jeff Liu, Katie Mitroff, Kat Morris, Rebecca Sugar & Paul Villeco	January 21, 2019	1053-161	0.99
160	32	"Change Your Mind"	Joe Johnston & Kat Morris	Lamar Abrams, Miki Brewster, Danny Kilgore, Hilary Florido, Joe Johnston, Ian Jones-Quartey, Christine Liu, Jeff Liu, Katie Mitroff, Kat Morris, Rebecca Sugar & Paul Villeco	January 21, 2019	1053-162	0.99
For their biggest mission yet, Steven, Connie, and the rest of the Crystal Gems attempt to change the way the Diamonds see Steven, other Gems, and themselves. Guest Animator: James Baxter

== Film (2019) ==
A television film based on the series, titled Steven Universe: The Movie, premiered on Cartoon Network on September 2, 2019; its production was first announced on July 21, 2018, at San Diego Comic-Con with the release of its first teaser trailer. The film is a musical, featuring musical collaborations with Chance the Rapper, Estelle, Gallant, Aimee Mann, James Fauntleroy, Macie Stewart, Mike Krol, and others, and takes place two years after the events of "Change Your Mind".

Title	Directed by	Written and storyboarded by	Original release date	Prod. code	U.S. viewers (millions)
Steven Universe: The Movie	Rebecca Sugar, Joe Johnston & Kat Morris (co-directors)	Story by : Matt Burnett, Hilary Florido, Joe Johnston, Ian Jones-Quartey, Ben Levin, Kat Morris, Jack Pendarvis & Rebecca Sugar; Teleplay and storyboards by : Lamar Abrams, Miki Brewster, Danny Kilgore, Hilary Florido, Joe Johnston, Amish Kumar, Jeff Liu, Katie Mitroff, Kat Morris, Chris Pianka, Madeline Queripel, Rebecca Sugar & Paul Villeco	September 2, 2019	1076-000	1.57
Two years after the events of "Change Your Mind", Steven thinks he has earned a happy ending after reforming the Gem Empire. However, Earth is attacked by a Gem named Spinel, a former playmate of Pink Diamond's come to take revenge on Steven for his mother abandoning her. Spinel erases Garnet, Amethyst and Pearl's memories and begins poisoning the planet. In a race against time, Steven must find a way to restore their memories and deactivate Spinel's poison injector before all organic life on Earth is destroyed.

== Steven Universe Future (2019–20) ==
A limited series, Steven Universe Future, intended to serve as an epilogue to the main series, premiered on December 7, 2019.

No.	Title	Animation directed by	Written and storyboarded by	Original release date	Prod. code	U.S. viewers (millions)
1	"Little Homeschool"	Haesung Park	Drew Green & Paul Villeco	December 7, 2019	001	0.81
2	"Guidance"	Ki-Yong Bae & Jin-Hee Park	Aaron Austin & Amish Kumar	December 7, 2019	002	0.80
3	"Rose Buds"	Seungwook Shin, Sangun Jeon & Sangman Park	Lamar Abrams & Adam Muto	December 7, 2019	003	0.84
4	"Volleyball"	Ki-Yong Bae & Eun-Ok Choi	Etienne Guignard & Maya Petersen	December 7, 2019	004	0.76
5	"Bluebird"	Ki-Yong Bae & Jin-Hee Park	Lamar Abrams & Miki Brewster	December 14, 2019	005	0.71
6	"A Very Special Episode"	Seungwook Shin, Sangun Jeon & Sangman Park	Aaron Austin & Amish Kumar	December 14, 2019	006	0.71
7	"Snow Day"	Haesung Park	Etienne Guignard & Maya Petersen	December 21, 2019	007	0.72
8	"Why So Blue?"	Seungwook Shin, Sangun Jeon & Sangman Park	Warren Fok, Joe Johnston & Amish Kumar	December 21, 2019	008	0.67
9	"Little Graduation"	Ki-Yong Bae & Eun-Ok Choi	Drew Green & Paul Villeco	December 28, 2019	009	0.41
10	"Prickly Pair"	Haesung Park	Drew Green & Paul Villeco	December 28, 2019	010	0.49
11	"In Dreams"	Seungwook Shin, Sangun Jeon & Sangman Park	Etienne Guignard & Maya Petersen	March 6, 2020	011	0.54
12	"Bismuth Casual"	Ki-Yong Bae & Jin-Hee Park	Lamar Abrams & Miki Brewster	March 6, 2020	012	0.51
13	"Together Forever"	Ki-Yong Bae & Choi Eunok	Etienne Guignard & Maya Petersen	March 13, 2020	013	0.57
14	"Growing Pains"	Ki-Yong Bae & Park Jinhui	Drew Green & Paul Villeco	March 13, 2020	014	0.55
15	"Mr. Universe"	Ki-Yong Bae & Eunok Choi	Warren Fok, Joe Johnston & Amish Kumar	March 20, 2020	015	0.50
16	"Fragments"	Haesung Park	Lamar Abrams & Miki Brewster	March 20, 2020	016	0.53
17	"Homeworld Bound" (Part 1)	Ki-Yong Bae & Choi Eunok	Drew Green & Paul Villeco	March 27, 2020 (Note: This episode was first released on the Cartoon Network app and website on March 23, 2020.)	017	0.69
18	"Everything's Fine" (Part 2)	Seungwook Shin, Sangun Jeon & Sangman Park	Amish Kumar & Maya Petersen	March 27, 2020	018	0.71
19	"I Am My Monster" (Part 3)	Haesung Park	Etienne Guignard & Miki Brewster	March 27, 2020	019	0.80
20	"The Future" (Part 4)	Ki-Yong Bae & Jinhui Park	Lamar Abrams & Miki Brewster	March 27, 2020	020	0.74

== Shorts ==
=== Season 2 (2015) ===
All six digital shorts combined make up one full production code of the second season (1031-058).

No.	Title	Written and storyboarded by	Original release date	Prod. code
1	"Lion Loves to Fit in a Box"	Katie Mitroff	May 28, 2015	1031-058D
Lion unsuccessfully attempts to get into various boxes.
2	"What Are Gems?"	Hilary Florido	July 6, 2015	1031-058A
Pearl teaches Steven about Gems, with some demonstrations from Garnet and Amethyst.
3	"We Are the Crystal Gems"	Hilary Florido, Joe Johnston, Jeff Liu & Katie Mitroff	September 4, 2015 (Note: This short was first shown during the Steven Universe panel at San Diego Comic-Con on July 10, 2015.)	1031-058F
Young Steven moves in with the three Crystal Gems, as the extended version of the title theme and second opening sequence shows.
4	"How Are Gems Made?"	Hilary Florido	October 1, 2015	1031-058C
Amethyst tells Steven how Gems are made.
5	"Unboxing"	Hilary Florido & Katie Mitroff	October 22, 2015	1031-058B
Steven creates a video where he receives and unboxes a new Hot Dog duffel bag from the Wacky Sack company.
6	"Fusion"	Katie Mitroff	November 2, 2015	1031-058E
Garnet takes over a dance studio to demonstrate to Steven how fusion works.

=== Season 4 (2016) ===
All five of these shorts combined make up one full production code of the fourth season (1040-112).

No.	Title	Written and storyboarded by	Original release date	Prod. code
1	"Cooking with Lion"	Colin Howard	October 3, 2016	1040-112A
Steven and Lion make cheese puff snack sushi for their online cooking show. Lion eats the dish at the end of the episode.
2	"Gem Karaoke"	Colin Howard	October 3, 2016	1040-112C
Connie records Steven and the Gems singing karaoke. Connie is reluctant to participate, but Steven convinces her to join in for the final verse.
3	"Steven Reacts"	Jeff Liu	October 3, 2016	1040-112D
Steven films a reaction video to the new episode of Crying Breakfast Friends. The events of the Crying Breakfast Friends episode and Steven's reactions humorously draw parallels to events in Steven Universe itself and fan reactions.
4	"Video Chat"	Colin Howard	October 3, 2016	1040-112B
On Connie's laptop, Steven video chats with Peridot on her tablet. Lapis, however, believes him to be trapped in the tablet. Steven rushes to the barn to explain.
5	"Steven's Song Time"	Jeff Liu	October 3, 2016	1040-112E
Steven makes a guitar tutorial for a song he composed. He explains that the song is his way of expressing feelings he has been having trouble talking about.

=== Dove Self-Esteem Project shorts (2018–19) ===
These shorts are written solely by Rebecca Sugar and are animated by Chromosphere Studio.

No.	Title	Storyboard by	Original release date
1	"Appearance-Related Teasing and Bullying"	Elizabeth Ito	March 31, 2018
Jasper and Amethyst talk about teasing and bullying.
2	"Competing and Comparing Looks"	Tiffany Ford	July 16, 2018
Smoky Quartz and Sardonyx talk about self-confidence and comparison.
3	"We Deserve to Shine"	Lamar Abrams	July 18, 2018
The Crystal Gems and Connie sing a musical number on the importance of deserving to stand out and shine.
4	"Media and Celebrities"	Hanna Nyström	October 10, 2018
Peridot talks about social media and its effects.
5	"Body Talk"	Seo Kim	December 21, 2018
Pearl and Bismuth talk about appearances and celebrating what makes us unique.
6	"Social Media"	Eusong Lee	June 24, 2019
Stevonnie talks about how to find positivity in social media.
7	"Body Functionality"	Jessie Wong	September 16, 2019
Garnet, Opal, and Stevonnie talk about body functionality.

=== The Crystal Gems Say Be Anti-Racist shorts (2020–21) ===
A series of public service announcement shorts where the Crystal Gems teach the audience about anti-racism. All of the shorts are written by Rebecca Sugar and Ian Jones-Quartey, and animated by Chromosphere Studio.

No.	Title	Original release date
1	"Don't Deny It, Defy It"	October 27, 2020
Garnet teaches a group of children about taking anti-racist action.
2	"Tell the Whole Story"	December 3, 2020
Pearl discusses the erasure of black people's accomplishments from history.
3	"See Color"	February 16, 2021
Amethyst discusses how color blindness is used to avoid conversations about racism.
4	"Be an Ally"	April 12, 2021
Greg Universe discusses how being an ally helps anti-racism efforts.

== Home media ==
Depending on the customer's region, Steven Universe is available through various video on demand services such as Hulu, Google Play, iTunes, Amazon Video, and Microsoft Movies & TV.

In North America, Warner Home Video has Steven Universe on DVD in several formats: single-disc compilations of select episodes, two Complete Season releases, and a Complete Collection box set. The Complete Collection, which was originally scheduled for November 3, 2020, and subsequently delayed until December 8, contains all 160 episodes of the original Steven Universe series, Steven Universe: The Movie, and all 20 episodes of Steven Universe Future; the bonus material from the Complete Season DVDs and The Movie was included alongside new content.

Madman Entertainment followed a similar pattern in Australia. They released two compilation DVDs, five Complete Season DVD and Blu-ray releases, and a standalone DVD of The Movie. Madman's season releases use an alternative episode order and lack all the bonus material included in the North American versions.

In the United Kingdom, Manga Entertainment released the first season on DVD and Blu-ray on February 24, 2020. This version used Madman's episode order but included the bonus material from the American DVD. The second season was planned to be released on March 16, 2020, but was cancelled before release.

Several episodes are re-ordered on home video. In the table below, the episodes are listed in the order they appear on the disc, and are numbered according to the episode tables above.

=== Region 1 ===
Title	Episode count	Running time (minutes)	Episodes	Extra features	Release date
Season releases
The Complete First Season	52	572	1–46, 50–55	Behind the Music and Listening Party featurettes, video performances and early demos of songs, animatics	January 30, 2018
The Complete Second Season	22	242	48–49, 47, 56-74	Animatics	April 16, 2019
Separate releases
Cartoon Network Holiday Collection	1	11	4	—N/a	October 7, 2014
Gem Glow	12	132	2, 1, 6, 7, 9, 10, 15, 12, 14, 19, 18, 22	Pilot episode	January 13, 2015
The Return	12	132	25, 26, 28, 35, 37, 36, 40, 44, 45, 50, 52, 53	—N/a	June 7, 2016
The Heart of the Crystal Gems	12	132	98/99, 107, 120, 130, 146, 147, 148, 149, 150, 151/152	—N/a	August 14, 2018
Steven Universe: The Movie	—N/a	90	—N/a	Behind the Curtain documentary, animatics, commentary	November 12, 2019
Steven Universe: The Complete Collection	180	—N/a	1–160, 1–20	Steven Universe: The Movie – Sing-a-Long Edition, minisodes, animatics, commentary, music videos, behind the scenes footage	December 8, 2020

=== Region 2 ===
Title	Episode count	Running time (minutes)	Episodes	Extra features	Release date
Season One	52	572	1–35, 37, 36, 38–47, 49-53 (Note: The packaging for this release incorrectly uses the same episodes listing as the American Season One DVD.)	Pilot episode, Behind the Music and Listening Party featurettes, video performances and early demos of songs, animatics	February 24, 2020

=== Region 4 ===
Title	Episode count	Running time (minutes)	Episodes	Extra features	Release date
Season releases
The Complete First Season	52	572	1–35, 37, 36, 38–47, 49-53	Pilot episode	May 4, 2016
The Complete Second Season	26	286	54–55, 48, 56-78	-	May 24, 2017
The Complete Third Season	25	275	79–103	Season 2 shorts	September 6, 2017
The Complete Fourth Season	25	275	104–128	Season 4 shorts	June 20, 2018
The Complete Fifth Season	32	360	129–160	-	October 6, 2021
Seasons 1–4	128	1,434	1–128	Pilot episode, Season 2 and 4 shorts	July 18, 2018
Seasons 1–5	160	1,794	1–160		October 6, 2021
Separate releases
Gem Glow	12	132	2, 1, 6, 7, 9, 10, 15, 12, 14, 19, 18, 22	Pilot episode	May 6, 2015
Arcade Mania	12	132	3, 4, 5, 8, 11, 16, 13, 20, 17, 35, 25, 26	-	January 6, 2016
Steven Universe: The Movie	—N/a	82	—N/a		October 6, 2021
