= Coach Steven =

- Steven Universe episode
- Steven (top middle) encourages his friends Sadie (left) and Lars (lower middle) and his father Greg during their workout.
- Episode no.: Season 1 Episode 20
- Directed by: Ki-Yong Bae (animation); Young-Wha Yoon (animation); Elle Michalka (art); Ian Jones-Quartey (supervising)
- Written by: Raven M. Molisee; Paul Villeco
- Production code: 1020-0516
- Original air date: August 21, 2014
- Running time: 11 minutes

Guest appearance
- Nicki Minaj as Sugilite

Episode chronology
← Previous "Rose's Room"	Next → "Joking Victim"

"Coach Steven" is the twentieth episode of the first season of American animated television series Steven Universe, which premiered on August 21, 2014 on Cartoon Network. It was written and storyboarded by Raven M. Molisee and Paul Villeco.

The episode features the debut of Sugilite (voiced by guest star Nicki Minaj), the fusion of Garnet and Amethyst. After witnessing the power of Sugilite, Steven becomes obsessed with becoming stronger, to the distress of Pearl, who believes he mistakes brute force for "real" strength.

== Plot ==
The Crystal Gems arrive at the ancient Gem Communication Hub to destroy the malfunctioning antenna. Garnet (Estelle) asks Amethyst (Michaela Dietz) to fuse with her to destroy it. Pearl (Deedee Magno Hall) objects, cautious of the instability of Garnet and Amethyst's combined form, but Garnet dismisses her misgivings and fuses with Amethyst, producing Sugilite (Nicki Minaj). Reveling in her immense size and strength, Sugilite begins recklessly smashing the pillars of the antenna with her giant, wrecking-ball–like flail. When Steven (Zach Callison) is hit by debris, Pearl takes him home, leaving Sugilite to finish the demolition alone. Moments after they teleport out, falling debris destroys the warp pad.

Later, Steven shows off his injury to his friends Lars (Matthew Moy) and Sadie (Kate Micucci). When they mock how much Steven is making of a tiny cut, he proposes that they all need to become stronger, and enlists his father Greg (Tom Scharpling) to build a makeshift gym on the beach. Steven explains to Pearl what he's doing: he wants to be stronger so he can be more useful, like Sugilite. When Pearl tells him, "There are different ways of being strong," Steven retorts, "I want to be strong in the real way."

As Lars, Sadie, and Greg begin their workout, Pearl sings the song "Strong in the Real Way", lamenting Steven's admiration of Sugilite's brute strength and hoping she herself can be a more positive role model for him. Steven sings a second verse, coaching the others in their workout before beginning his own.

The next morning, Steven is too sore to move. Sugilite comes stomping up the beach, outraged that Pearl and Steven left her behind and unwilling to separate. She begins attacking Pearl and smashing Greg's gym. As Pearl despairs that she isn't strong enough to protect Steven, he grabs his megaphone and coaches her back into self-confidence. Heartened, Pearl allows Sugilite to chase her to the top of the hill, and then throws her spear at the cliff beneath Sugilite's foot so she loses her footing. Sugilite falls to the beach below, and her flail lands on her head, separating her. As Garnet and Amethyst reel on the sand, Pearl embraces them; and Garnet apologizes for not listening to Pearl's advice earlier.

== Music ==
The episode features the song "Strong in the Real Way", performed by Deedee Magno Hall (as Pearl) and Zach Callison (as Steven), composed by series creator Rebecca Sugar. Guitars were performed by Stemage.

== Broadcast and reception ==
"Coach Steven" had an advance screening at San Diego Comic-con and had its television premiere on Cartoon Network on August 21, 2014. Its initial American broadcast was viewed by approximately 1.852 million viewers and received a Nielsen household rating of 0.35, meaning it was viewed by 0.35% of all households.

Cecilia Mazumdar Stanger of the Minnesota Daily wrote that she found the episode disappointing at first, especially because guest star Minaj did not participate in the episode's song. However, she adds that the episode "had all of the elements that make Steven Universe such a compelling cartoon."

In the Italian dub of the episode, Lars' line "We're not married" was censored.
