= Bismuth (Steven Universe) =

- Steven Universe episode
- Steven (right) meets Bismuth. Atypically, the episode's title was displayed during the story instead of after the opening theme.
- Episode no.: Season 3 Episode 24
- Directed by: Hye Sung Park (animation); Ki-Yong Bae (animation); Jin-Hee Park (animation); Jasmin Lai (art); Joe Johnston (supervising)
- Written by: Lamar Abrams; Colin Howard; Jeff Liu; Katie Mitroff
- Original air date: August 4, 2016
- Running time: 23 minutes

Guest appearance
- Uzo Aduba as Bismuth

Episode chronology
← Previous "Steven vs. Amethyst"	Next → "Beta"

"Bismuth" is the twenty-fourth episode of the third season (and the 100th episode overall) of American animated television series Steven Universe; it premiered on August 4, 2016 on Cartoon Network. A special double-length episode featuring guest star Uzo Aduba, it was advertised as the 100th episode of the series. (although the very next episode, "Beta", is the actual 100th episode) It was written and storyboarded by Lamar Abrams, Colin Howard, Jeff Liu and Katie Mitroff. The episode was viewed by 2.153 million viewers.

In the episode, Steven accidentally discovers and frees a Gem bubbled within Lion's mane, who is introduced as Bismuth, one of the original Crystal Gems from 5,300 years ago. As her old friends Pearl and Garnet rejoice, Steven eventually learns why Bismuth was kept hidden all these years.

The episode aired as part of the "summer of Steven" event, in which 20 new episodes of Steven Universe aired over the course of four weeks; a clip from the episode was released in advance to promote the event.

== Plot ==
While in Lion's mane, Steven (Zach Callison) accidentally pops a bubbled Gem that was stored there, which regenerates into Bismuth (Uzo Aduba). Steven brings her out of Lion's mane, and Garnet (Estelle) and Pearl (Deedee Magno Hall) joyfully introduce her to Steven and Amethyst (Michaela Dietz) as one of the original Crystal Gems, thought lost during the Gem War. Bismuth is dismayed to learn that thousands of years have passed and they are the last of the Crystal Gems.

Bismuth takes the Crystal Gems to her forge, where she used to make weapons for the Rebellion. She speaks passionately about her desire to overthrow the "upper crust" of the Gem Homeworld and allow all Gems the freedom of self-determination. Bismuth gives the Gems upgrades for their weapons, and they all return to the temple to spar. Steven, intimidated by the intensity of the sparring, offers to show Bismuth some Earth traditions: badminton, card games, making pizzas and watching movies.

That night, Bismuth reminisces about Rose Quartz. When Steven says that he feels he'll never be able to live up to his mother's legacy, Bismuth tells him he can be someone even better—himself. She offers to give Steven a new weapon of his own.

Back at the forge, Bismuth shows Steven her masterpiece: the Breaking Point. While Rose's sword can compromise a Gem's physical form without damaging the gem itself, the Breaking Point is capable of shattering a gem in one hit, thus killing them permanently. Steven rejects the weapon, saying its use would make the Crystal Gems no better than Homeworld. Bismuth says that that's what Rose said when Bismuth first showed the Breaking Point to her, and concludes that Steven is just Rose in disguise. They fight, while Bismuth accuses "Rose" of hypocrisy and not valuing the lives of her followers.

At the end of the fight, in despair, Bismuth points the Breaking Point at her own gem and dares Steven to pull the trigger. When he refuses, she turns it around to point at him, forcing Steven to run her through with Rose's sword. Steven promises Bismuth that, unlike Rose, he'll tell the others what happened; her last words are "Then you really are better than her." Steven destroys the Breaking Point. Back at the temple, Steven and the other Crystal Gems sadly place Bismuth's gem, bubbled again, in the basement.

== Broadcast and reception ==
"Bismuth" premiered on August 4, 2016 on Cartoon Network. Its initial American broadcast was viewed by approximately 2.153 million viewers. It received a Nielsen household rating of 0.56, meaning that it was seen by 0.56% of all households, making it the highest rated show of the night. This was the fifteenth episode of the "Summer of Steven" event, where a new episode aired every weekday for four weeks.

This episode received a great deal of praise, particularly toward Aduba's performance as Bismuth. Eric Thurm of The A.V. Club lauded the episode, giving it an A. Thurm felt there were great character moments in the episode and that the double length helped the audience bond with Bismuth. Furthermore, Thurm felt that the episode was "the opening of a floodgate" into the experiences of the Gem War. Vrai Kaiser of The Mary Sue made particular emphasis on the episode's portrayal of the ethical turmoil of war and its inevitability as "a means of Steven finally having to draw a line in what he believes that isn't a categorical win".
