= Gem Drill =

- Steven Universe episode
- Steven and Peridot reach the Cluster inside the Earth.
- Episode no.: Season 3 Episode 2
- Directed by: Ki-Yong Bae (animation); Jin-Hee Park (animation); Jasmin Lai (art); Kat Morris (supervising); Ian Jones-Quartey (co-executive producer)
- Written by: Raven Molisee; Paul Villeco
- Original air date: May 12, 2016
- Running time: 11 minutes

Episode chronology
← Previous "Super Watermelon Island"	Next → "Same Old World"

"Gem Drill" is the second episode of the third season of American animated television series Steven Universe, which premiered on May 12, 2016 on Cartoon Network. It was written and storyboarded by Raven Molisee and Paul Villeco. The episode was viewed by 1.693 million viewers.

The episode deals with one of the two prominent threats of the second season, the Cluster. Steven and Peridot use their completed drill to travel down into Earth's mantle to stop The Cluster from taking form and destroying the Earth after it starts showing signs of manifestation.

== Plot ==
Picking up immediately after the events of "Super Watermelon Island", with the other Crystal Gems stranded on Mask Island, Steven (Zach Callison) tells Peridot (Shelby Rabara) that it is up to the two of them to stop the Cluster, the underground geo-weapon that threatens to destroy the Earth. Steven and Peridot climb into their drill and begin tunneling. As they drill, Steven and Peridot discuss Peridot's previous life on the Gem homeworld and how it compares to her life on Earth. When Cluster prototypes—artificial, deformed fusions of broken Gem shards buried in the Earth—attack the drill, Steven fights them off but feels uneasy about not trying to help them.

The drill eventually arrives at the Cluster, an immense spherical formation of millions of Gem shards. It is trying to take a physical form, but is not yet able to. Peridot prepares the drill as Steven frets that maybe the Cluster just doesn't know what it is doing. Peridot is still determined to destroy it, as there is a possibility that it still could destroy Earth if they don't stop it, and begins to drill into the Cluster, but is unable even to pierce the surface.

Rendered unconscious by the resulting ordeal, Steven experiences a vision of himself floating among the shards of the Cluster. He realizes he can communicate with the shards, which are obsessed with trying to take form in order to feel whole. He tries to persuade them that perhaps all they need is each other's company. The shards begin conversing with each other, but cannot resist the impulse to take form. Steven encases a few shards in bubbles, and then wakes up in the drill to see the shards slowly begin to bubble each other. Steven eventually merges all the small bubbles into one huge bubble, encasing the Cluster.

After Steven and Peridot arrive back on the surface, Pearl (Deedee Magno Hall), Garnet (Estelle), and Amethyst (Michaela Dietz) finally return with an unconscious Lapis Lazuli, and Steven tells them what happened. The last shot of the episode is the Cluster, peacefully lying deep in the Earth inside of Steven's bubble.

== Production ==
The episode was written and storyboarded by Raven Molisee and Paul Vileco and directed by Ki-Yong Bae and Jin-Hee Park (animation), Jasmin Lai (art), Kat Morris (supervising) and Ian Jones-Quartey (co-executive producer).

== Broadcast and reception ==
"Gem Drill" premiered on May 12, 2016 on Cartoon Network. Its initial American broadcast was viewed by approximately 1.693 million viewers. It received a Nielsen household rating of 0.46, meaning that it was seen by 0.46% of all households. The episode was the second of a two-part episode which was the first episode of the "In Too Deep" special event in which five new episodes aired across four weeks.

This episode was met with mixed reception. The episode was praised for the drilling scenes, the creepy atmosphere, and Peridot's characterization. However, the conclusion to the Cluster arc, which involved the component shards of the Cluster bubbling each other, was heavily criticized. Many people believed it to be an unsatisfying conclusion to the story arc, and that this conclusion was rushed and anticlimactic.

Eric Thurm of The A.V. Club praised the episode, giving the episode an A.
