= A Single Pale Rose =

- Steven Universe episode
- Rose Quartz becomes Pink Diamond, revealing that they are the same Gem.
- Episode no.: Season 5 Episode 18
- Directed by: Ki-Young Bae (animation); Jin-Hee Park (animation); Kat Morris (supervising); Liz Artinian (art)
- Written by: Danny Kilgore; Hilary Florido
- Story by: Matt Burnett; Ben Levin; Rebecca Sugar; Kat Morris; Joe Johnston
- Original air date: May 7, 2018
- Running time: 11 minutes

Guest appearance
- Susan Egan as Rose Quartz/Pink Diamond

Episode chronology
← Previous "Can't Go Back"	Next → "Now We're Only Falling Apart"

"A Single Pale Rose" is the eighteenth episode of the fifth season of the American animated television series Steven Universe. It first aired on May 7, 2018 on Cartoon Network as the second half of a two-part special with the preceding episode "Can't Go Back". It was directed by Kat Morris and Liz Artinian and written and storyboarded by Danny Kilgore and Hilary Florido from a story by Matt Burnett, Ben Levin, Kat Morris, Joe Johnston, and series creator Rebecca Sugar.

Sugar described it and "Can't Go Back" as "huge episodes that we’ve been building to for a very long time" that would have major implications for the rest of the series, and change viewers' interpretations of the events of previous episodes.

The episode focuses on Steven Universe confronting Pearl with questions about the supposed shattering of Pink Diamond millennia ago, and builds to a major plot twist for the series: the revelation that Steven's mother Rose Quartz was actually Pink Diamond herself, who faked her death with Pearl's assistance.

This episode received critical acclaim for Deedee Magno Hall's performance as Pearl, the quality of the artwork, and the structure of the episode's story, as well the significance of the plot twist for the broader narrative of the series.

== Plot ==
Steven (Zach Callison) is contemplating the conflicting information he has received about Pink Diamond's shattering and anxiously waits while Amethyst (Michaela Dietz) teaches Pearl (Deedee Magno Hall) how to use her new cell phone. After Amethyst leaves, Steven confronts Pearl and asks her if she is the one who shattered Pink Diamond. Pearl does not answer, seemingly shocked. When Amethyst returns, Pearl immediately changes the subject and stores her phone in her gem, leaving Steven confused.

Later, Steven receives a text message from Pearl: "I want to tell you but I can't.🙊" Steven returns home and confronts her about it, but Pearl says she has not used her phone since that morning. As she tries and fails to retrieve her phone from her gem, Steven receives another text — a pink hibiscus emoji(🌺), which shocks Pearl. She asks him to enter her gem and get it himself, hinting that he will find the answers to his questions there.

Inside Pearl's gem, Steven meets a personification of Pearl's ability to compartmentalize. She cannot find the phone stored with Pearl's other belongings and sends Steven deeper into Pearl's mind to look for it. He visits her traumatic memories of Rose Quartz's pregnancy and the aftermath of the Gem War. He eventually arrives at the moment after Pink Diamond's shattering. He sees gem shards on the ground and Rose holding her sword, crying in despair. When he steps closer, he realizes that it is not Rose but Pearl, shape-shifted into Rose's form. She reveals Pink Diamond's undamaged gemstone in her hand and sends Steven further back through her memories.

Steven ends up inside Pink Diamond's palanquin hearing a conversation between Rose (Susan Egan) and Pearl. While Pearl is hesitant to do what Rose is asking, Rose insists and tells her that they will be free afterward. Pearl finally agrees to Rose's plan and, to Steven's shock, Rose reverts into her true form: Pink Diamond. She creates some fake diamond shards and swallows them, and gives one last command to Pearl as a Diamond: to never again speak of what really happened. As Pink Diamond leaves the palanquin, Pearl turns to Steven and gives him the missing cell phone. She assumes the form of Rose Quartz and heads out to fake the shattering. Steven texts Pearl back in the real world and is pulled out of her mind.

Steven somberly states what he has learned: his mother was actually Pink Diamond. Behind him, Amethyst and Garnet gasp in shock.

== Production ==
This episode was written and storyboarded by Danny Kilgore and Hilary Florido. The episode was directed by Liz Artinian (art director) and Kat Morris (supervising director).

== Broadcast and reception ==
The broadcast of both "Can't Go Back" and "A Single Pale Rose" was viewed by 0.74 million viewers.

The episode has received acclaim for its resolution of one of the show's biggest mysteries and its compelling narrative. Eric Thurm of The A.V. Club describes it as a "fundamental shift" in the show's narrative that created excitement about the unfolding plot. Vrai Kaiser of The Mary Sue calls it "one of the best episodes in a long, long time", praising Deedee Magno Hall's performance, and says that the episode leaves the show at a crossroads with regard to how it will deal with the aftermath of this revelation. Shamus Kelley at Den of Geek gave the episode five out of five stars, calling the episode "compelling" and saying that it "casts a whole new light on Rose and Pearl's relationship".
