= Off Colors =

- Steven Universe episode
- Steven (center) cries on Lars's body (right) after he dies protecting the Off-Colors, unknowingly reviving him.
- Episode no.: Season 5 Episode 3
- Directed by: Sang Un Jeong (animation); Seung Wook Shin (animation); Joe Johnston (supervising); Liz Artinian (art)
- Written by: Lamar Abrams; Jeff Liu
- Original air date: May 29, 2017
- Running time: 11 minutes

Guest appearances
- Ashly Burch as Rutile Twins; Kathy Fisher as Fluorite; Erica Luttrell as Padparadscha; Enuka Okuma as Rhodonite

Episode chronology
← Previous "The Trial"	Next → "Lars' Head"

"Off Colors" is the third episode of the fifth season of the American animated television series Steven Universe, which premiered on May 29, 2017 on Cartoon Network. It was written and storyboarded by Lamar Abrams and Jeff Liu. The episode was viewed by 1.524 million viewers.

A direct continuation of the previous episode "The Trial", "Off Colors" depicts Steven and Lars, fleeing from the Diamonds, as they encounter a group of Gems known as the "Off-Colors", who are rejected by other Gems and live in hiding.

== Plot ==
Continuing immediately after "The Trial", Steven Universe (Zach Callison) and Lars Barriga (Matthew Moy) escape the Diamonds via the abandoned lower area of Homeworld. They are spotted by Shattering Robonoids, Gem-hunting robots that attack them. A Gem called the Rutile Twins (Ashly Burch), who has two conjoined bodies from the waist up, helps save them. The Twins lead Steven and Lars to what they describe as a place "where those who don't belong... belong". They are led to an enormous abandoned Kindergarten where the Rutile Twins call out the other Gems in hiding: a fusion named Rhodonite (Enuka Okuma), who is fearful that they have been followed; an orange Sapphire called Padparadscha (Erica Luttrell), who can only predict the "future" after it has already occurred; and a large fusion called Fluorite (Kathy Fisher). These Gems are dubbed "Off-Colors" for their differences, unusual formation, or aberrant behavior, which are seen as defective by Gem Homeworld standards; if caught, they would be shattered.

Three Robonoids appear as everyone scrambles to hide. Since Lars is not a Gem, the Robonoids cannot detect him, and he risks himself to protect the others, throwing rocks at the Robonoids and blocking their scanners with his body. Steven destroys two of the Robonoids by reflecting their beams with his shield, and Lars jumps onto the third, hitting it with a broken stalactite. Lars thrusts the stalactite into the Robonoid, causing it to explode. The explosion results in Lars' body being flung against a rock column, killing him.

Devastated, Steven tearfully cradles Lars' body to his chest, his tears falling onto Lars' face. As Steven's tears are absorbed into his skin, Lars' body starts to glow bright pink. As the glowing fades, Lars comes back to life, now with a scar through one eye, as well as pink skin and hair.

== Production ==
This episode was written and storyboarded by Lamar Abrams and Jeff Liu. The episode was directed by Sang-Un Jeon and Seung Wook Shin (animation directors), Liz Artinian (art director), Joe Johnston (supervising director), and Nick DeMayo (animation director).

The death and revival of Lars had been a planned story element from the very beginning of the series; creator Rebecca Sugar had conceived of the character before the show itself, and this development had been considered to appear as early as the show's second episode. However, justifying it within the story required pushing its arrival further forward over time.

== Broadcast and reception ==
"Off Colors" premiered on May 29, 2017 on Cartoon Network, as the third part of the four-episode "Wanted" special. Its initial American broadcast was viewed by 1.532 million viewers and received a .40 on the Nielsen household rating.

The episode received positive reviews from critics, several critics lauding Matthew Moy's performance. The A.V. Club writer Eric Thurm argued it was one of the slower episodes of the "Wanted" special, but praised the handling of Lars' death. Lauding its graphic portrayal and emotional weight, he wrote that "It's stunning that the Steven Universe team got away with depicting this in so much detail—what's the last death you can remember in a cartoon or movie that was this explicit?" In the same review, he praised the episode's unexpected revelation of Rose Quartz's resurrection abilities and the show's unpredictability, stating that "for the first time in a while, there's no way to know what's going to happen on Steven Universe—and it's thrilling."
