= List of Secret Mountain Fort Awesome and Uncle Grandpa characters =

The characters in the two American animated television shows Secret Mountain Fort Awesome, and its spin-off, Uncle Grandpa, are created by Peter Browngardt. The two shows are produced by Cartoon Network Studios for Cartoon Network.

== Secret Mountain Fort Awesome characters ==
The characters of Secret Mountain Fort Awesome.

=== Festro ===
Festro (voiced by Peter Browngardt) is a purple monster with large tusks, fangs and wears a pair of briefs. Festro is brash, crude, selfish, and inconsiderate, preferring to is slack off and party, and loves to punch himself in the face. He rarely takes responsibility for any of his actions and is usually taking advantage of his friends. Despite his disgusting behavior, Festro has moments where he owns up to his mistakes. He also has moments where he will do anything to defend his friends.

=== Fart ===
The Fart (voiced by Pat Duke) is a monster with buttocks on his head, face, chest, and in place of his hands and feet. The Fart is the most sensitive and caring out of all the Disgustoids. His tastes and actions are more refined as he tries to make more of an effort to understand the humans and abide by their culture in hopes of abolishing their hatred for Disgustoids. He is also the most logical out of all of them, preferring to think things through before just jumping into them.

=== Gweelok ===
Gweelok (voiced by Paul Rugg) is a slimy green monster with red pimples, clawed hands, and no legs. He is the smartest person in the group, but can also be stubborn and anti-social among others. He sometimes manages to take care of things himself and keeps a tight lid on his emotions. In the episode "Gweelok Cracks", it is shown that he becomes red whenever jealous or aggressive, making him quite scary to be around.

=== Slog ===
Slog (voiced by Steve Little) is a short Disgustoid with black fur covering his body and face. He has a large nose with peach colored flesh. Slog usually wears a stained orange shirt with no pants or shoes and has long yellow nails. Slog is not well educated, making him more vulnerable to the other Disgustoids manipulating or taking advantage of him. He is usually quick to follow along with whatever Festro tells him to do, though he sometimes questions the morality of the actions (IE in The Bet) and even tries to encourage Festro to do the right thing.

=== Dingle ===
Dingle (voiced by Peter Browngardt) is a small blue Disgustoid with long arms and scraggly straight black hair with a bald spot at the top. Dingle’s personality is usually quite calm despite his voice sounding a bit crazed. Like The Fart, he can serve as a voice of reason sometimes amongst the other disgustoids.

== Uncle Grandpa characters ==
The main characters of Uncle Grandpa.

=== Main characters ===
==== Uncle Grandpa ====
Uncle Larry Grandpa (voiced by Peter Browngardt, and Pendleton Ward in "For Pete! Love, Pen") is a magical, shapeshifting human who is described as the uncle and grandfather of everyone in the world. His outward appearance is depicted as rather clownish and unsophisticated, but he is well-meaning, fun-loving, supportive, and surprisingly competent when in need. His catchphrase is "Good morning!"

==== Mr. Gus ====
Mr. Michael Marshal Breakfast Gusford (better known as Mr. Gus; voiced by Kevin Michael Richardson) is a large green dinosaur who wears a white tank top and is usually the voice of reason. Debuting as Uncle Grandpa's rival in "Leg Wrestler", he eventually becomes his friend and bodyguard. He is unfazed by most of Uncle Grandpa's eccentricities and seems to have an even temper despite his roommates, but often loses his temper, especially where Pizza Steve's antics are concerned. One of Gus' favorite parts of the day is 9:00 PM, which is his designated bathroom time, and during that period he likes to take a bubble bath and read for an hour.

==== Pizza Steve ====
Pizza John Stevens "Steve" (voiced by Adam DeVine, and Pendleton Ward in 'For Pete! Love, Pen') is an anthropomorphic pepperoni pizza slice with sunglasses and a member of Uncle Grandpa's crew. He is vain, troublesome, and often brags about himself, pretending to be very popular with women. Steve is featured in his own cartoon shorts entitled "A Slice of Life with Pizza Steve", which usually involve Steve exaggerating his abilities.

==== Giant Realistic Flying Tiger ====
Giant Realistic Flying Tiger (often referred to by her initials, GRFT) is a static photographic cutout of a tiger and Uncle Grandpa's pet, whom he uses as a means of flying transportation. She is the only female member of Uncle Grandpa's crew. While she exhibits normal tiger traits such as only being able to communicate by roaring, she is able to fly and leaves a rainbow trail behind. Her personality is a cross between that of a stereotypical teenage girl, a house cat, and a real-life tiger. In order for Tiger's emotions to be shown, only certain parts of her body (specifically her facial ones) are animated. This is done in a stop-motion style.

==== Belly Bag ====
Belly Bag (voiced by Eric Bauza) is a talking red fanny pack and Uncle Grandpa's best friend. He carries all of Uncle Grandpa's valuables, especially his robotic laser hammer Samantha. Belly Bag's insides contain many unusual objects and pocket dimensions. Despite being usually attached to Uncle Grandpa, he has the ability to walk and can produce multiple hands from inside his body. In the second Uncle Grandpa short "Secret Mountain Uncle Grandpa", he is referred to as Fanny Pack and voiced by Paul Rugg.

=== Recurring characters ===
==== Tiny Miracle ====
Tiny Michael "Miracle" Grandpa the Robot Boy (voiced by Tom Kenny) is Uncle Grandpa's imaginary ROBO-UG-JUNIOR model robot grandson that can perform tiny miracles. He can be summoned by a person saying something that includes the words "tiny miracle" in it and then the task he/she is attempting.

==== Beary Nice and Hot Dog Person ====
Beary Nice (voiced by Audie Harrison) and Hot Dog Person (voiced by Eric Bauza) are the stars of their own recurring segment, "New Experiences with Beary Nice and Hot Dog Person". Beary is an anthropomorphic bear with a bow tie and a positive outlook on life and Hot Dog Person is a cynical anthropomorphic hot dog. Each of their segments consist of them trying something different for the first time.

==== Charlie Burgers ====
Charlie Burgers the Ball-Loving Dog Next Door (voiced by Brian Posehn) is a talking dog who befriends Uncle Grandpa and his friends. He is well-behaved and he enjoys going on adventures with Uncle Grandpa.

==== Santa Claus ====
Brother Santa Claus Grandpa (voiced by Bob Joles) is the famous figure for Christmas and revealed to be Uncle Grandpa's brother in the Christmas special. They have had a troubled relationship since 1983.

==== Baby Frankie ====
Baby "Frankie" Frankenstein (vocal effects by Mark Hamill) A tag-along with Uncle Grandpa in his adventures. Because of his condition, he is unable to talk, communicating only through groans. He is usually seated next to Uncle Grandpa in his chair.

==== Xarna the She-Warrior of the Apocalypse ====
Xarna the She-Warrior of the Apocalypse (pronounced Zarna; voiced by Eric Bauza) is a masculine cyborg girl. She is on a mission to get some gas for the Mad Motorcycle. She is a spoof of Xena the Warrior Princess and She-Ra.

==== Evil Wizard ====
Evil Wizard (voiced by Rob Schrab) is a wizard that goes around trying to make everyone's day horrible by humiliating them but actually ends up making their lives better.

==== Priscilla Jones ====
Little Priscilla Jones (currently known as Aunt Grandma; voiced by Lena Headey) is Uncle Grandpa's nemesis with a British accent and is the main antagonist of the series. She wants revenge on him for ruining her science project and rather than help her played hacky sack instead resulting in her getting second place in the science fair. She prefers to solve children's problems using simple practical solutions, the complete opposite of what Uncle Grandpa does.

=== Children and adults characters ===
==== Belly Kid ====
Belly Kid (voiced by Zachary Gordon) is a kid who has a big belly. He was first ashamed of it, but Uncle Grandpa taught him the best features of having a big belly. He appeared in "Belly Bros".

==== Caleb ====
Caleb (voiced by Jonathan Adams) is a boy that Uncle Grandpa takes out of a math test to go battle Evil Wizard in outer space. He appeared in "Tiger Trails".

==== Melvin ====
Melvin (voiced by Jarid Root) is a bratty kid who likes to play Space Emperor, with him being the emperor. When Uncle Grandpa accidentally sent him into another dimension, he was sent to a planet where he is the emperor. He discovered what it is like being a servant, and learns his lesson after Emperor Krell bosses him around.

==== Melvin's Babysitter ====
Melvin's Babysitter (voiced by Grey DeLisle) is a teenage girl with braces who babysits Melvin in the episode "Space Emperor".

==== Eric ====
Eric (voiced by Eric Bauza) is a kid who does not have a nickname but Uncle Grandpa helps him. Uncle Grandpa helps him be legendary to get his nickname. In the process of becoming legendary he becomes tall and muscular. In the end he gets the nickname, "Cupcake", because he loves cupcakes.

==== Mary ====
Mary (voiced by Pamela Adlon) is a nervous girl. She takes her driver's test, but fails. Uncle Grandpa takes her on a test and helps her pass. Uncle Grandpa gives her her own "Freedom and Independence USA" truck for passing her test.

==== Dennis ====
Dennis (voiced by Tom Kenny) is a kid who wanted to finally pass his teacher's hard class and avoid going to summer school, until Uncle Grandpa comes and eats his homework and putting Dennis in danger of going to summer school. So Dennis and Uncle Grandpa go to Egypt to get a real pyramid to make sure Dennis gets a good grade on his project.

==== Mrs. Numty ====
Mrs. Numty (voiced by Grey DeLisle) is Dennis' teacher.

==== Guillermo ====
Guillermo (voiced by Eric Bauza) is a kid who had an awesome new bike until the Perpetual Persistence crushed it. So in Uncle Grandpa and Belly Bag's absence Mr. Gus and Pizza Steve help Guillermo by giving him a trashcan and saying it was a "Magical Uncle Grandpa Bike".

==== Susie ====
Susie (voiced by Grey DeLisle) is a little girl who was afraid of the dark, but learned how to combat her fears by imagining herself as a scary monster.

==== Adam ====
Adam (voiced by Dee Bradley Baker) is a kid who could not become the master of a very hard video game, until Uncle Grandpa and Pizza Steve shrink to get inside his brain to become better at video games. He would always have his eyes barely open showing that he has been playing videogames too much, and his eyes are sore from playing too much.

==== Angry Man Johnson ====
Angry Man Johnson (voiced by Roger Craig Smith) is a grumpy old man who hates Charlie Burgers. Judging by his name, he is always angry at everyone, including Uncle Grandpa.

==== Austin ====
Austin (voiced by Carlos Alazraqui) is a kid who has a lot of imperfections and asks Uncle Grandpa to turn him into a robot to become the most perfect kid, and to eliminate all imperfections.

==== Shaquille O'Neal ====
Shaquille O'Neal (voiced by himself) is a professional basketball player who is an old friend of Uncle Grandpa. In the past, Uncle Grandpa helped O'Neal realize his dream of being a stand-up comedian.

==== Akira ====
Akira (voiced by Laura Bailey) is a Japanese kid who wanted to make the best action packed monster movie of all time.

==== Riley ====
Riley (voiced by Scott Menville) is a teenage boy who fails a test, his father grounds him and demands him to fold laundry all weekend instead of going to a party.

==== Josie ====
Josie (voiced by Grey DeLisle) is a girl who was trying to make duck lips for a site called "face hole" and tries to get a lot of followers and likes.

==== Emily ====
Emily (voiced by Kari Wahlgren) is a girl scout. She didn't know how to earn a badge at anything until Uncle Grandpa taught her.

==== Isabella ====
Isabella (voiced by Nika Futterman) is an Italian girl who is an aspiring inventor but her inventions are useless, so Uncle Grandpa helps her by bringing Leonardo da Vinci there.

=== Ule Gapa ===
Ule Gapa (voiced by Tom Kenny) is an unfriendly, grumpy big mouthed alien creature. He appeared occasionally after Uncle Grandpa used a magical spell to fight another magical spell, in the process destroying his own logo in an intermission.

=== Pilot characters ===
==== Ham Sandwich Jones ====
Ham Sandwich Jones (voiced by Steven Blum) is a rotund nerdy teenager who started out hating Uncle Grandpa, but later grew to like him. In the Secret Mountain Fort Awesome episode "5 Disgustoids and a Baby", he appeared as less responsive, and more stingy while intensely playing a portable gaming system.

==== Little Judy Jones ====
Little Judy Jones (voiced by Grey DeLisle) is Ham Sandwich's mother.

==== Remo ====
Remo (voiced by Tom Kenny) is a destructive popular kid, who similarly started off hating Uncle Grandpa, but ends up warming up to his antics. He appears in Secret Mountain Fort Awesome episode "Secret Mountain Uncle Grandpa".

==== Remo's Friends ====
Remo's Friends (voiced by Steve Little and Tom Kenny) are the cool-dude friends of Remo.

===== Kev =====
Kev (voiced by Jon Heder) is a destructive teenager who thought art was dumb until Uncle Grandpa convinced him that art is pretty fun. Kev appears in "Viewer Special". The character originally appeared in a live-action film starring Browngardt called The Last American.

==== Crazy Driving Man ====
Crazy Driving Man (voiced by Paul Rugg, Wallace Shawn, and Kevin Michael Richardson) is a man who wears framed glasses, who is the somewhat "uncool" father of his son Remo. He reappears as a driving instructor in Uncle Grandpa's 7th episode, "Driver's Test", and claims to be the father of a crazy driving baby from another universe.
