= The Answer (Steven Universe) =

- Steven Universe episode
- After being rebuked by Homeworld, Garnet (left) joins the Crystal Gems
- Episode no.: Season 2 Episode 22
- Directed by: Byung Ki Lee (animation); Jasmin Lai (art); Joe Johnston (supervising)
- Written by: Lamar Abrams; Katie Mitroff
- Original air date: January 4, 2016
- Running time: 11 minutes

Guest appearances
- Susan Egan as Rose Quartz; Erica Luttrell as Sapphire; Lo Mutuc (Note: Credited as Charlyne Yi) as Ruby

Episode chronology
← Previous "Too Far"	Next → "Steven's Birthday"

"The Answer" is the 22nd episode of the second season of American animated television series Steven Universe, which premiered on January 4, 2016 on Cartoon Network. It was written and storyboarded by Lamar Abrams and Katie Mitroff. The episode was viewed by 1.384 million viewers.

In this episode, Garnet tells Steven the story of how Ruby and Sapphire met each other, fused to create Garnet, began their romantic relationship, and eventually joined the Crystal Gems. The episode received a nomination for a Primetime Emmy Award for Short-format Animation and was adapted as a best-selling children's book.

== Plot ==
Garnet (Estelle) awakens Steven (Zach Callison) at midnight on his birthday to tell him the tale of how Ruby (Lo Mutuc) and Sapphire (Erica Luttrell) first met and fused to become Garnet.

5,750 years in the past, the Gem Homeworld is in the process of colonizing Earth, but a group of rebels is halting progress. A team of diplomats is sent to Earth to investigate, among them being Sapphire and three Ruby bodyguards. Sapphire reports her vision of the future to Blue Diamond, the leader of the mission: in the upcoming battle, the rebels will defeat seven Gems, including Sapphire herself and two Rubies, but will be captured, ending the rebellion.

The rebels—Rose Quartz (Susan Egan) and Pearl (Deedee Magno Hall)—attack the Sky Arena. The battle proceeds as Sapphire had foreseen, and once two of the Rubies have been defeated, Sapphire thanks the remaining Ruby for her efforts and prepares for the inevitable. Ruby refuses to accept this outcome and leaps towards Sapphire, saving her but unintentionally fusing with her and forming Garnet for the first time. The crowd of diplomats stares in surprise and disgust at the confused Garnet, and Rose and Pearl flee during the distraction.

Garnet immediately unfuses, and Ruby takes the blame for the failure of Sapphire's prediction and the illicit fusion. Blue Diamond sentences Ruby to be shattered, but Sapphire grabs her and escapes, jumping down to Earth's surface. On the ground, Ruby and Sapphire find shelter and discuss their feelings about the unexpected fusion. Over a montage of the two of them exploring Earth and getting to know each other better, they sing the song "Something Entirely New", trying to understand what it means to have become Garnet. They end with a fusion dance, fusing into Garnet once more.

Having difficulty getting used to her body, Garnet tumbles down a hill into Pearl and Rose. Rose welcomes Garnet and encourages her to talk about how she feels. Garnet peppers Rose with questions about Ruby, Sapphire, and their fusion, but Rose tells Garnet that she already is "the answer" she seeks to all her questions.

In the present, as Garnet finishes her story, Steven asks her what the answer was. She tells him: "love".

== Production ==
Episodes of Steven Universe are written and storyboarded by a single team. "The Answer" was written by Lamar Abrams and Katie Mitroff, and directed by supervising director Joe Johnston, while Byung Ki Lee provided animation direction, and Jasmin Lai served as art director. The episode's art was inspired by Lotte Reiniger, an animator most well known for directing The Adventures of Prince Achmed, the oldest surviving animated feature film. Rebecca Sugar liked her for doing something new in an era where there wasn't much precedence for animation. Sugar herself has been compared to Reiniger for her milestone of being the first woman to independently create a series for Cartoon Network. Storyboarder Katie Mitroff called this her favorite episode.

=== Music ===
The episode features the song "Something Entirely New". The song was arranged by Aivi & Surasshu, the music team for the series, and written by series creator Rebecca Sugar. It features vocals by Lo Mutuc (as Ruby) and Erica Luttrell (as Sapphire). Jeff Ball plays violin for the song. The episode also features several instrumental songs by Aivi & Surasshu: "Happy Birthday, Steven/5,750 Years Ago", "Blue Diamond", "The Rebels/Garnet's First Fusion", "Escaping the Colony/Feelings of Love" and "The Answer".

== Broadcast and reception ==
"The Answer" premiered on Cartoon Network on January 4, 2016. Its initial American broadcast was viewed by approximately 1.384 million viewers. It received a Nielsen household rating of 0.30, meaning that it was seen by 0.3% of all households. The episode was the first in a "StevenBomb", a programming schedule in which one new episode of Steven Universe airs daily during the regular work week.

The episode received mostly positive reviews from critics, with particular praise going to the song "Something Entirely New" and the voice acting by Estelle. Several critics favorably compared the episode to a fairy tale. Lyn Muldrow of Autostraddle said that Steven Universe had "out-gayed" itself with this episode. Eric Thurm of The A.V. Club was somewhat critical of the episode, giving it a B+, and stating that it "doesn’t really tell us anything we couldn’t have guessed, or anything that we really needed to know". He also felt that Ruby and Sapphire were still one-note characters, not complex enough to compare to the other characters of the show. Sarra Sedghi of Paste listed "Something Entirely New" as the fifth best song of the show's first two seasons.

== Book adaptation ==
The Answer
- Author: Rebecca Sugar
- Illustrator: Tiffany Ford, Elle Michalka
- Language: English
- Publication date: September 6, 2016
- ISBN: 978-0399541704

A children's book adaptation of the episode was released on September 6, 2016. It was published by Cartoon Network Books and written by Rebecca Sugar, with art by Elle Michalka and Tiffany Ford. The book reached no. 7 of the New York Times Best Seller List for Children's Middle Grade Hardcover books on October 2, 2016. According to Sugar, after the book's publication she was brought into a meeting and "asked to explain herself," noting that she would, in meetings like this, defend the show's stories and "audience of queer youth."

Fusion praised the book as "a subversive fairy tale that both upends and queers the storybook canon". Like Fusion, PBS's report described the book as "part of a larger, changing story about how cartoons portray LGBTQ characters for kids."
