= Garnet (Steven Universe) =

Steven Universe character

- Steven Universe character
- Garnet's 2019 design
- First appearance: "The Time Thing" (as Garnet; 2013) "Jail Break" (as Ruby and Sapphire; 2015)
- Created by: Rebecca Sugar
- Voiced by: Estelle (Garnet); Lo Mutuc (Ruby); Erica Luttrell (Sapphire)

In-universe information
- Species: Gem
- Gender: Sexless / Non-binary woman (she/her pronouns used)
- Fighting style: Boxing

Garnet is a fictional character from the American animated series Steven Universe, created by Rebecca Sugar. Based on the real world mineral garnet, Garnet is a Gem, a fictional alien being that exists as a magical gemstone projecting a holographic body. Garnet is a fusion—i.e., two Gems combining personalities and appearances as one shared holographic body—formed by two Gems named Ruby and Sapphire, who choose, out of love for each other, to remain permanently (but reversibly) fused.

Garnet is voiced by Estelle, a British singer. Estelle's performance has seen a positive reception, particularly for her songs "Stronger than You" and "Here Comes a Thought". Garnet has been frequently praised for being a depiction of a positive lesbian relationship.

== Role in Steven Universe ==
The de facto leader of the Crystal Gems, who protect humanity and the Earth from danger, Garnet is initially presented as stoic and unfeeling but pragmatic and capable. The show's writers have described Garnet as characterized by great self-confidence; they represent this through the fact that she never asks questions. Eric Thurm of The A.V. Club described Garnet as "initially the most reticent, distant, and simply alien" of the Crystal Gems. After the Crystal Gems' original leader Rose Quartz gave her life to create her son Steven Universe, Garnet took on the role of the group's de facto leader. Early in the series, she appears relatively distant, as she rarely speaks out. As the story of Steven Universe progresses, however, she becomes more relatable. Writing for Minnesota Daily, Cecilia Mazumdar Stanger pointed out that Garnet is far from a perfect leader and can make mistakes.

From the gemstones in her palms, Garnet can summon two powered gauntlets. Her "future vision" allows her to view different possible outcomes to predict future events, and she can temporarily share this ability with Steven by kissing him on the forehead. Eric Thurm noted that scenes in which Garnet uses her future vision are among the show's best visual accomplishments. Garnet also appears in the OK K.O.! Let's Be Heroes crossover episode "Crossover Nexus", in which she says that her visor helps her channel her future vision.

=== Ruby and Sapphire ===
According to Rebecca Sugar, Garnet was intended to be a fusion since the pilot episode, though Ruby and Sapphire came into focus while Sugar was writing for Garnet. Sugar described the process as "reverse engineering" the two personalities based on what the production team brought to the show.

Viewers learn that Garnet is a fusion in the first-season finale, "Jail Break", but foreshadowing in earlier episodes led many viewers to suspect it before it was revealed. Ruby is characterized as a feisty and aggressive fighter, while Sapphire is a stoic and contemplative oracle, resulting in a complex dynamic between them. Garnet's stable relationship while fused is used as a metaphor for the power of healthy relationships, as Ruby and Sapphire together are stronger than any one Gem on their own. Garnet is described as being made of "literal love, the romantic love of two queer individuals," as most Gems, including Ruby and Sapphire, present in a feminine manner.

The second-season episode "The Answer" features a flashback of Ruby and Sapphire's first meeting: Sapphire was a member of Blue Diamond's court who came to Earth to assist in the capture of Rose Quartz, and Ruby was one of her bodyguards. Ruby and Sapphire accidentally fuse for the first time when Ruby pushes her out of the way of danger, and they flee to escape execution for the taboo of mixed-Gem fusion. Garnet joins the Crystal Gems after encountering Rose Quartz, who tells her that Ruby and Sapphire's love is "the answer" to all her questions. A later episode, "Now We're Only Falling Apart", reveals how Garnet's creation influenced Rose Quartz's ideals to fight for her right to exist.

In a story arc late in the fifth season, Garnet unfuses when Sapphire feels betrayed by Rose, who had encouraged their fusion in the first place, and parts ways with Ruby, saying that their relationship is based on a lie. As Sapphire learns Rose's full story from Pearl, Ruby realizes she has never spent any time exploring her identity apart from Sapphire, and leaves to embark on a quest of self-discovery. Eventually the two both realize that they still want to be together, and in the episode "Reunited", they are married as their way of being together on their own terms, rather than just because of Rose Quartz.

== Reception ==
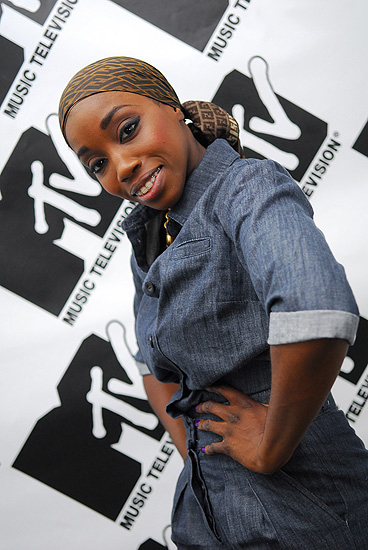
Estelle

Garnet is voiced by Estelle in the original English dub of Steven Universe. Estelle's vocal performance is commonly praised by critics: Vrai Kaiser of The Mary Sue commended Estelle's voice work in "Jail Break" by stating that "the amount of love, layers, and history she packs into so few words goes right to the heart no matter how many times you watch it." Garnet's narration in "The Answer" was praised by Eric Thurn because Estelle got the opportunity to do voice work that was more fun and "soft". AJ Adejare of The Fandom Post criticized the voice director of Steven Universe for under-utilizing Estelle's talents, as Garnet is mostly silent in the show. Garnet is Estelle's first voice-over role, and the character was designed by Rebecca Sugar while she was listening to Estelle's music.

Garnet has commonly been praised as a depiction of a romantic lesbian relationship in an animated series. Since 2010, animated television series such as The Loud House and The Legend of Korra have shown a larger amount of LGBT representation. Steven Universe makes frequent use of LGBT-related themes: Pearl has strong romantic feelings to Rose Quartz, and Stevonnie is a genderqueer character. Writing for The Lawrentian in January 2016, Bridget Keenan described Garnet as "first canon lesbian couple on Cartoon Network". However, Keenan also criticized Garnet for portraying as healthy a relationship that would realistically be "unhealthy, unstable and controlling," as Ruby and Sapphire seemed completely controlled by the relationship.

=== Censorship ===
Some of the romantic interactions between Ruby and Sapphire have been censored during localization to other countries. In the Swedish translation of the episode "Hit the Diamond", flirting between the two characters was replaced with more neutral dialogue, causing controversy in Sweden; some fans of the series demanded that Cartoon Network Sweden not censor Ruby and Sapphire's relationship again.

=== Science ===
In 2025, a South American flower of the genus Commelina was named Commelina almandina, a name referring to the garnet colour of the "gem-like" fruits. The authors noted that this was intended to honour of the character Garnet, as a way of bringing "much-needed attention to BIPOC and LGBTQIA+ researchers in STEM." The same authors named another species C. sugariae in honour of Rebecca Sugar.
