= Change Your Mind (Steven Universe) =

- Steven Universe episodes
- Title card
- Episode nos.: Season 5 Episodes 29–32
- Directed by: Joe Johnston; Kat Morris
- Written by: Lamar Abrams; Miki Brewster; Danny Kilgore; Hilary Florido; Joe Johnston; Ian Jones-Quartey; Christine Liu; Jeff Liu; Katie Mitroff; Kat Morris; Rebecca Sugar; Paul Villeco
- Original air date: January 21, 2019
- Running time: 44 minutes

Guest appearances
- Uzo Aduba as Bismuth; Christine Ebersole as White Diamond; Lisa Hannigan as Blue Diamond; Alastair James as Rainbow Quartz 2.0; Patti LuPone as Yellow Diamond; Natasha Lyonne as Smoky Quartz; Shoniqua Shandai as Sunstone

Episode chronology
← Previous "Escapism"	Next → Steven Universe: The Movie

"Change Your Mind" is the series finale of the American animated television series Steven Universe; a 44-minute quadruple-length episode, it is counted as the 29th to 32nd episode of the series' fifth season and as the 157th to 160th episodes of the series overall. The only 44-minute episode of the series, it was directed by Joe Johnston and Kat Morris, with art direction by Liz Artinian, and written and storyboarded by Johnston, Morris, Lamar Abrams, Miki Brewster, Danny Kilgore, Hilary Florido, Ian Jones-Quartey, Christine Liu, Jeff Liu, Katie Mitroff, Paul Villeco, and series creator and executive producer Rebecca Sugar.

The conclusion of the original storyline conceived by Sugar when developing Steven Universe, the episode serves as the culmination of the story arcs developed over the course of the series, most notably the Crystal Gems' conflict with the Gem Homeworld and the healing of the monstrous corrupted Gems. It also features the debut of new designs for most of the main characters and several previously unseen fusions. In "Change Your Mind", Steven must reunite with the Crystal Gems and open the eyes of the three Diamonds to the dysfunctionality of their family dynamic.

Officially promoted under the alternative title "Steven Universe: Battle of Heart and Mind", the episode premiered on Cartoon Network on January 21, 2019. It received a viewership of 0.989 million people and was acclaimed by critics, with most praise going to its themes, animation, writing, and voice performances. Reviewers unanimously agreed that "Change Your Mind" felt like a crucial turning point for the series that could effectively serve as a series finale, (Note: The episode was not marketed as a series finale, but future content in the series was not yet formally announced; while ultimately serving as the final episode of Steven Universe, it was later followed by Steven Universe: The Movie and epilogue series Steven Universe Future.) with The Post stating "Steven Universe can never go back to how it was before."

The series was followed by the television film Steven Universe: The Movie (2019) and the epilogue limited series Steven Universe Future (2019–2020), both of which take place two years after the events of "Change Your Mind".

== Plot ==
Imprisoned in a tower on the Gem Homeworld, Steven (Zach Callison) dreams a memory of his mother, Pink Diamond, being scolded by Blue Diamond (Lisa Hannigan) millennia ago. When he wakes up, Blue, thinking he is Pink Diamond, arrives to scold him again. However, he helps her understand that Pink abandoned the Diamonds because of their dysfunctional family dynamic, and she decides to help the Crystal Gems escape. Yellow Diamond (Patti LuPone) tries to stop them, but Steven helps her realize that deferring to White Diamond's perfectionism has made her miserable. Steven and Connie (Grace Rolek) prepare to escape with the dormant gems of Garnet (Estelle), Amethyst (Michaela Dietz), and Pearl (Deedee Magno Hall), but are intercepted by White Diamond's spaceship.

Shortly thereafter, Bismuth (Uzo Aduba), Lapis Lazuli (Jennifer Paz), and Peridot (Shelby Rabara) arrive from Earth in Yellow and Blue's repaired spaceships, and attack White's ship. After a brief battle, Yellow and Blue finally tell White about how they feel, but she responds by turning them into colorless drones acting as extensions of herself. Steven accidentally drops Amethyst, Pearl, and Garnet's gems, but dives after them and helps them regenerate their bodies by briefly fusing with each. Ultimately, all four fuse into Obsidian to reach White's chamber.

White Diamond (Christine Ebersole) turns Garnet, Amethyst, and Pearl into drones, and tries to convince Steven that he really is Pink Diamond, wrongly convincing herself that she is someone else. Attempting to restore Pink to her true self, White pulls Steven's gem from his body. It regenerates a body in Steven's form, which rebukes White by yelling "She's GONE!" and blocks White's attempts to control it. Connie carries Steven's weakened human body over to his Gem counterpart, and the two fuse back into Steven. White refuses to acknowledge that Pink is gone, saying that Pink is just "acting like a child"; Steven responds, "I am a child—what's your excuse?" White blushes in embarrassment, releasing the others from her control. As White, realizing for the first time she is fallible, suffers an existential crisis, Steven suggests that she should let everyone, including herself, "be whoever they are".

The Crystal Gems and Diamonds travel back to Earth. Shortly after they arrive, Steven's friend Lars (Matthew Moy) arrives as well, in his starship crewed by Off-Color rebel Gems. The Diamonds help Steven heal the corrupted Gems that the Crystal Gems have spent centuries capturing, including Jasper. The episode ends with Steven spending a peaceful evening with his friends and family; he sings the song "Change Your Mind", celebrating his newfound emotional security.

== Production ==
=== Writing, art and animation ===
The episode was directed by supervising directors Joe Johnston and Kat Morris and art director Liz Artinian, and written and storyboarded by Johnston, Morris, Lamar Abrams, Miki Brewster, Danny Kilgore, Hilary Florido, Ian Jones-Quartey, Christine Liu, Jeff Liu, Katie Mitroff, Paul Villeco, and series creator and executive producer Rebecca Sugar. Former supervising director Jones-Quartey, who had departed from the series to create OK K.O.! Let's Be Heroes, returned to storyboard a brief segment of the episode. This marked the most writers/storyboard artists credited for a single episode; they were credited in the alphabetical order of their last names. The sequence in which Steven's Gem and human bodies reunite was animated by guest animator James Baxter, a veteran of Disney animated films.

The episode features the debut of three new fusions: Steven fuses for the first time with Pearl, forming "Rainbow Quartz 2.0" (Note: The original Rainbow Quartz, the fusion of Pearl and Rose Quartz, appeared in a flashback in the episode "We Need to Talk".) (voiced by Alastair James), and with Garnet, forming Sunstone (voiced by Shoniqua Shandai). Shortly afterwards, all four main Crystal Gems fuse to form Obsidian.

In October 2020, Sugar said that she hoped that the episode is "relatable to a lot of LGBTQIA+ kids and teens" with those in places of authority telling you something that isn't true and thinking they are at fault, instead of it being something bigger.

=== Music ===
"Change Your Mind" features three songs; the first two are new versions of previously heard songs from the series. When the Crystal Gems and Diamonds return to Earth, Sadie (Kate Micucci) and her band are performing "Let me Ska My Van Into Your Heart", a ska cover of "Let Me Drive Me Van Into Your Heart", a song from "Laser Light Cannon", the second episode of the series. Over a montage in which the corrupted Gems are cured, Steven sings a reprise of "We Are the Crystal Gems", the main theme song of the show, with a new verse celebrating the success of the Crystal Gems' philosophy of peaceful coexistence.

The third song is an original song titled "Change Your Mind" and written by Sugar; the episode concludes with Steven performing the song for Garnet, Amethyst and Pearl on vocals and ukulele. When the song is performed, the four main characters mirror the pose they take at the end of the opening credits in every episode. Sugar originally wrote the song as an expression of her own feelings while fighting with Cartoon Network for the right to include a same-sex wedding in the episode "Reunited" earlier in the season.

=== Promotion ===
The episode was promoted by Cartoon Network as "Steven Universe: Battle of Heart and Mind". It was the last part of a five-week story arc revolving around White Diamond and the Gem Homeworld titled Diamond Days, which started with the TV premiere of "Legs from Here to Homeworld" on December 17, 2018. The official synopsis was "Steven faces his biggest challenge yet."

== Release and reception ==
=== Viewership ===
"Change Your Mind" first aired on Cartoon Network on January 21, 2019, when it was seen by 0.989 million viewers and gained a 0.30 in the 18-49 demographic.

=== Critical reception ===
"Change Your Mind" was acclaimed by critics. The handling of the episode's themes was largely praised in regard to the overall themes of the series, particularly during the final face-off between Steven and White Diamond. The scale, animation, writing, and voice performances, particularly of Christine Ebersole as White Diamond, were also highly praised. Despite this, some minor criticism was made towards the pacing of its first half and resolution.

In a positive review published at Polygon, Eric Thurm called the episode "an impressive feat of compassion, and the narrative endpoint of 156 episodes of television", praising how the episode illustrated the evolution of Steven from being "irritating" and "a huge goofball incapable of taking anything seriously" at the beginning of the series to "a remarkably mature, emotionally intelligent person", stating "Steven Universe isn't about Steven discarding the things that made, and still make, him childish — it's about figuring out how to use them in more specific, salutary ways." Writing for The A.V. Club, Thurm called it "a pretty damn good and impressive episode, and a really wonderful, hectic capper to Era Two of Steven Universe. [...] And beyond all of this plot, thematic material, and character development, "Change Your Mind" is still an animated episode of television—one with some pretty visually stunning sequences." He praised White Diamond's character and Christine Ebersole's performance, calling White "the perfect villain" for the series' themes, and called the moment White removes Steven's gem "the best, most gut-wrenching moment of the episode, and probably of the series". He also stated "Do [the Diamonds'] epiphanies happen too quickly? Maybe! As thrilling as all of this is, and as bold as it is that it's all happening at once, there are some moments in 'Change Your Mind' that veer a little too much into outright corniness, above and beyond the normal level we should expect from the show.”

In a highly positive review for The Post Joseph Stanichar stated: "The first half of 'Change Your Mind' is action-packed and filled to the brim with answers to fans' pleas. Chances are, if fans have been wanting to see something in Steven Universe, they will finally see it in 'Change Your Mind.'" The Mary Sue's Vrai Kaiser praised the episode, calling it "the proper conclusion of the story. [...] What's important is that the overall tone is a hopeful one. Each plot thread we see touched on is heading in a positive direction, implying it will continue in that vein." Shamus Kelley at Den of Geek! gave a positive review, stating "The animation, especially in the final White Diamond climax, is movie level. The music, the acting, the staging, everything is incredible" but being critical of the ending, giving the episode a 3.5 rating out of 5. Writing for Bubble Blabber, Noelle Ogawa also gave a highly positive review, and gave the episode a 9.5/10 rating.

=== Analysis ===
==== White Diamond confrontation ====
Several media outlets analyzed the episode, in particular the treatment and characterization of White Diamond, and the climax of the episode, interpreted as a confrontation between her ideology and Steven's, as Steven's emotion-based personality, focused on empathy and open-mindedness, eventually wins her over despite her originally unshakeable positions on right and wrong and disregard for feelings.

Polygon largely praised how the confrontation with White Diamond emphasized the series' theme of understanding and empathy, as "the ostensibly villainous Gems, from Peridot to Lapis Lazuli to the Diamonds themselves, are just misguided people who could use a friend. [...] Instead of punching White Diamond in retaliation or giving in to her manipulation, Steven remains insistently himself — even as White Diamond does the unthinkable and removes Steven's Gem from his body. [...] She has, essentially, been infected with Steven's feelings, and with her own. He's won."

The Post stated that despite the large battle preceding it, "it isn't until when the Crystal Gems finally reach White Diamond (Christine Ebersole) that things truly get serious. White Diamond doesn't throw a single punch or kick, but instead fights with her mind and words. After draining the color from Steven's friends, new and old, and possessing them, White digs into Steven's greatest insecurities, both about himself, his friends and about his past as Rose [and Pink Diamond]. Steven perseveres, though. Following a traumatic series of events, Steven resolves his dedication to his friends, positivity in the face of danger, and most of all, accepting himself as his own person. 'I've always been me,' Steven tells White Diamond. This pure love exposes White as imperfect, and she finally gives up, agreeing to help Steven."

Bubble Blabber stated: "White is stuck in her head, yes, but it is because of a sense of responsibility she feels. She sees herself as the ultimate being, and so she doesn't really believe in the abilities of anyone other than herself. It's the 'if you want to do it right, do it yourself' taken to extremes, because she believes that she has no flaws, and by contrast, is very aware of everyone else's. This includes independent thought, personality traits, and really anything that makes someone beyond a function, but an actual person. White fundamentally doesn't trust other people, and so she can't imagine ideas that don't match her own."

==== Story arcs conclusion ====
"Change Your Mind" marks the conclusion of the story arcs originally conceived by Rebecca Sugar when she first created the series. Reviewers unanimously agreed that it felt like a landmark and turning point for Steven Universe, as it completed all the ongoing storyline arcs for the series up until then, and that the episode would have been a fitting series finale; as such, it also led them to question the direction the show was going to take afterwards.

The Post called "Change Your Mind" "the end of an era. With a new revelation nearly every second of the episode's 45-minute runtime, Steven Universe can never go back to how it was before. [...] Steven Universe is not over, but what it was certainly is. It's future is uncertain, and it's hard to even imagine the show continuing from what was once intended to be the series' definitive end. But even if by some disaster the show goes to crap after this, at least this era of the series ended with not with a bang — although there were plenty of those along the way — but with a song. A song of love." Analyzing the ending of the episode, they concluded that "Steven Universe has been rightly hailed as a haven for the LGBTQ community, and others who have been demonized or ostracized by society. Paralleling Steven's message to the Diamonds, [the 'Change Your Mind' song] makes one last plea to those who still won't accept these people. Not all of them will listen. But maybe, in time, those of future generations will."

Bubble Blabber stated "We know that a sixth season is confirmed, but what could that entail? A lot of the major plot points have been wrapped up, and this seemed like as good of an ending as we'd get. More problems could occur, of course, but the big issues that had been set up since the start have now been resolved. What else is there left to do?" Polygon stated "In this week's episode, 'Change Your Mind,' which marks the conclusion of creator Rebecca Sugar's originally planned five-season arc for the series (but is not the series finale), Steven prevails over the entire Gem empire by flexing his sentimental muscles. The bulk of the hour (also dubbed the Battle of Heart and Mind) is devoted to Steven opening the eyes of the three other Diamond rulers of the Gem civilization to his, and his mother Pink's, view of humanity. It's an impressive feat of compassion, and the narrative endpoint of 156 episodes of television."

The Mary Sue stated "This certainly had the feel of things coming to an end [...] When an hour-long special closes the book on the show's major antagonists and ends by mirroring the final shot of the show's opening theme, it's hard not to call it an ending of sorts, even if more content arrives at a later date. As a finale, it's in fine form." Questioning the future of the series, they claimed that "If the show wants to carry on, it has to open [its own] questions back up and answer them. Where are the corrupted gems going to go? How far have the Diamonds actually come in dismantling millennia of toxic mentalities, which 'Change Your Mind' only really has to represent as a one-off change of heart done in an intense moment of connection rather than the hard day-to-day work of becoming a better person. And what about that oppressive totalitarian regime, though?"

==== Other themes ====
The A.V. Club stated "The nature of White's ability, and the way her character forms around it (or vice versa), are the cause of so many small, careful moments of storytelling in 'Change Your Mind' that it feels like a daunting task to list even half of them. She forces Pearl to fight Connie, forcing the student to confront the master. (Note: Pearl is the one that taught Connie how to fight by giving her sword fighting lessons in the season two episode "Sworn to the Sword".) [...] Her Pearl, we learn, was originally Pink's Pearl—a neat piece of writing, given the way the episode starts. And her ability is a kind of combination of Yellow's force blasts and Blue's empathetic field, transforming other Gems into puppet-like extensions of her own being. And she first does this to Yellow and Blue after they express their feelings, in a scene that also confirms the Diamonds' redemption as Steven refers to them with the formal Crystal Gems salutation, 'Guys?' [...] The show's position has long been that no one in its universe is fundamentally evil, and that just talking to people is often enough to get them to open up—especially for Steven, who is inhumanly kind and understanding."

Cord Cutters believed that the fact that Peridot and Lapis Lazuli do not perform fusion in the episode despite their strong relationship was a meaningful choice from the crew of Steven Universe: "Lapis Lazuli was in an abusive relationship for months before she was set free by Steven and the Crystal Gems. (Note: Lapis previously showed signs of psychological trauma after a lengthy reluctant fusion with Jasper, which lasted from the season one finale "Jail Break" to the season three premiere "Super Watermelon Island".) Peridot, on the other hand, was someone who never got to learn how to love herself because she spent most of her life being looked down on or forced to think logically to the point of self-deprivation. Now look at them. Lapis stands tall while sporting a smile instead of cowering with her arms folded across her chest. Peridot never stops trying to do better things and smiles with her friends instead of finding the little moments to be useless. These gems now have confidence and love for themselves."

Despite being very positive about the episode, Den of Geek! heavily criticized the lack of nuance of the ending and a perceived absolute redemption of the villains, stating "Jasper was a horrific abuser. The Diamonds murdered so many people. Are we just supposed to forget about that? How do the other Gems feel? What about the rest of Crystal Gem society? It leaves the episode on a sour note, which is unfortunate because the rest is so good. [...] Not everyone can be reasoned with. Not everyone will come around to your side. It's a nice aspirational idea but not practical. Steven Universe should be better than this."

Steven's efforts to get the Diamonds to recognize his identity has been interpreted as an allegory for transgender individuals struggling to get their families to accept their gender identity. Eric Thurm of The A.V. Club notes "When Blue forcefully tells Yellow, 'She prefers to be called Steven,' she's finally listening to Steven when he says that he's not his mom—but she could just as easily be talking about a trans relative asking to be called by their chosen name"; and Julie Muncy at io9 also identifies White Diamond's assumption that Steven is "just an expression of Pink's own psychological issues" as "a rhetorical gesture that's bound to be sadly familiar to a lot of trans viewers".
