= Jail Break (Steven Universe) =

- Steven Universe episode
- During the song "Stronger Than You", a re-fused Garnet prepares to fight Jasper.
- Episode no.: Season 1 Episode 49
- Directed by: Ki-Yong Bae (animation); Jin-Hee Park (animation); Elle Michalka (art); Ian Jones-Quartey (supervising)
- Written by: Joe Johnston; Jeff Liu; Rebecca Sugar
- Production code: 1026-052
- Original air date: March 12, 2015
- Running time: 11 minutes

Guest appearances
- Kimberly Brooks as Jasper/Malachite; Erica Luttrell as Sapphire; Jennifer Paz as Lapis Lazuli/Malachite; Shelby Rabara as Peridot; Lo Mutuc (Note: Credited as Charlyne Yi) as Ruby

Episode chronology
← Previous "The Return"	Next → "Full Disclosure"

"Jail Break" is the 49th episode of the first season of American animated television series Steven Universe, which premiered on March 12, 2015 on Cartoon Network. The episode was written and storyboarded by Joe Johnston, Jeff Liu, and series creator Rebecca Sugar. The episode acts as a continuation of the arc started in the previous episode, "The Return", and the two aired alongside each other as a two-part special. Both episodes were watched by 1.697 million viewers.

The episode covers Steven's attempt to save the Gems from the captivity of Peridot and Jasper, two Homeworld Gems leading a scouting mission on Earth. The episode reveals that Garnet is a fusion, and introduces the characters Ruby and Sapphire, Garnet's component Gems. The romantic relationship between Ruby and Sapphire has been interpreted as one of the ways Steven Universe provides LGBT representation.

== Plot ==
Having been knocked unconscious by Jasper (Kimberly Brooks) in the previous episode, Steven (Zach Callison) awakens in a prison cell on the Gem warship. The door of the cell is a force field which can neutralize the strength of any Gem, but Steven can pass through it unharmed. While searching for the Crystal Gems, Steven comes across an unfamiliar Gem, Ruby (Lo Mutuc), and disrupts the force field with his body so she can escape. He then helps her search for her companion, Sapphire (Erica Luttrell), by following the sound of her singing. Steven and Ruby encounter Lapis Lazuli (Jennifer Paz), but she insists that Steven leave her in her cell to avoid exacerbating their current problems. As Steven and Lapis talk, Ruby runs off in impatience.

Steven finds Sapphire and frees her from her cell. Soon, Ruby and Sapphire meet up again; as they happily reunite, to Steven's surprise, Ruby and Sapphire fuse into Garnet (Estelle). She sends Steven to find Amethyst (Michaela Dietz) and Pearl (Deedee Magno Hall) and free them from their cells. After he leaves, Jasper confronts Garnet. As they fight, Garnet sings the song "Stronger Than You", celebrating the power of Ruby and Sapphire's relationship. Meanwhile, Steven, Amethyst, and Pearl overpower Peridot (Shelby Rabara) and take control of the ship. Garnet and Jasper's battle destroys the ship's power core, causing the ship to crash-land onto Earth as Peridot flees in an escape pod.

After the ship hits Earth's surface, the Crystal Gems, Jasper, and Lapis emerge from the wreckage. Jasper convinces Lapis to fuse with her to defeat the Crystal Gems. However, once they fuse into Malachite, Lapis uses her water powers to drag the fusion into the ocean and subdue Jasper. The episode ends with Steven receiving a frantic phone call from Connie (Grace Rolek).

== Production ==
Episodes of Steven Universe are written and storyboarded by a single team. "Jail Break" was written by Joe Johnston, Jeff Liu, and series creator Rebecca Sugar, and directed by co-executive producer Ian Jones-Quartey, while Ki-Yong Bae and Jin-Hee Park provided animation direction, and Elle Michalka served as art director.

In the combat scene between Jasper and Garnet, Jasper's fighting style pays homage to the video game character Sonic the Hedgehog. Johnston indicated on his blog that Ruby and Sapphire's fusion dance is a reference to a dance between Pazu and Sheeta in Castle in the Sky, and that the series often references Studio Ghibli films. The fact that Garnet was a fusion had been previously foreshadowed; for example, in "Coach Steven", the fusion Sugilite (Amethyst and Garnet) is shown to have three gems rather than two. Sugar had intended for Garnet to be a fusion since the show's pilot episode.

=== Music ===
The episode features the song "Stronger Than You", written by Rebecca Sugar and arranged by Aivi & Surasshu, the music team for the series. The song was performed by Estelle as Garnet, and includes strings performed by Jeff Ball. Steven Velema (Surasshu of Aivi & Surasshu) wrote that Estelle's vocals were originally recorded over a demo by Jeff Liu. Sugar wanted the duo to create an arrangement "to capture the feeling of 'there's no way [Garnet] could lose'". To "emphasize" Garnet's new form, they changed the timbre of the bass, which represents Garnet in the series.

== Themes ==
The episode has been cited as an important example of LGBT representation in children's media because of the relationship between Ruby and Sapphire. Writer Joe Johnston clarified that the two are romantically involved and Jones-Quartey specified that their relationship could be considered lesbian. An Autostraddle article compares their relationship and fusion to a marriage, where "two parts [make] one whole". The relationship was also compared to similar lesbian relationships in other animated series, such as Adventure Time and The Legend of Korra.

The episode also explores the power of "partnership, love, and community over power-based hierarchy", according to Vrai Kaiser, writing for The Mary Sue. This is represented in the fight between Jasper and Garnet, which is also a performance by voice actor Estelle of the song "Stronger Than You". In the scene, Garnet represents love—specifically, between two gay non-binary individuals—which creates her "emotional balance" and strength. Eric Thurm elaborates on this point, noting that Jasper's quote, "Fusion is just a cheap tactic to make weak Gems stronger", can be interpreted as a criticism of emotional relationships. This makes the physical fight abstractly represent "a contest between Jasper's lone-wolf warrior ideology and Garnet's harmony between two people". According to Thurm, Garnet's victory supports the "thesis statement" of the series, which is that "loving relationships are the most important thing in life".

The episode acts as a turning point for the show because of how Steven's relationship with the Gems changes. According to Sugar, what interviewer Lan Pitts calls "a more serious tone" in episodes following "Jail Break" stems from the fact that Steven has become a more "equal" and capable member of the Crystal Gems. Sugar states that after this point, it almost "becomes another show".

== Broadcast and reception ==
"Jail Break" premiered on Cartoon Network on March 12, 2015. 1.697 million viewers watched its initial American broadcast, and the episode received a Nielsen household rating of 0.4, meaning 0.4% of all households viewed it. It aired as part of a programming event advertised as a "Stevenbomb", in which new episodes aired every day for five consecutive days. In order to give the Stevenbomb a strong plot arc, several episodes written as part of the first season were postponed to air as part of the second season, after the Stevenbomb. Thus, although "Jail Break" was written as the 52nd episode of the first season, it was the 49th episode to air.

The episode received positive attention from critics, both for its animation quality and the song "Stronger Than You", performed by Estelle voicing the character Garnet. Writing for The A.V. Club, Eric Thurm called the song "funky as hell". Estelle also received praise for the strength carried in her succinct lines of dialogue.

The episode was nominated twice at the 43rd Annie Awards, in the categories of Best Animated TV/Broadcast Production For Children's Audience and Outstanding Achievement, Storyboarding in an Animated TV/Broadcast Production. However, it did not win either category.
