= Sarah Stiles =

American singer and actress (born 1979)

- Stiles in 2019
- Born: Sarah Grace Stiles; June 20, 1979 (age 47); Massachusetts, U.S.
- Occupations: Singer; actress
- Years active: 1991–present

Sarah Grace Stiles (born June 20, 1979) is an American singer and actress known for her work in Off-Broadway and Broadway theatre.

She performed the role of Kate Monster/Lucy the Slut in Avenue Q, and performed in the musical Vanities, in which she played the character of Joanne. She was nominated for the Tony Award for Best Featured Actress in a Play in 2015 for her performance in Hand to God and the Tony Award for Best Featured Actress in a Musical in 2019 for her performance in Tootsie. She also voiced Spinel in Steven Universe: The Movie (2019), and Steven Universe Future (2020). She can also be heard as diva Emma Olivia in As the Curtain Rises, an original Broadway soap opera from the Broadway Podcast Network.

== Early life ==
Stiles was born on June 20, 1979, in Massachusetts and was later raised in Strafford, New Hampshire attending Strafford Elementary School. After middle school, Stiles began her high school career at Coe-Brown Northwood Academy in New Hampshire.

== Career ==
At the age of 12, Stiles started getting involved with theater productions in Portsmouth, New Hampshire. Her first role was the titular character in Annie at the Seacoast Repertory Theater. As a teenager, Stiles played two other major roles while living in New Hampshire: Dorothy in The Wizard of Oz, and Cinderella in Cinderella. Stiles loved the performing arts so much that she spent her summers working at the Prescott Park Arts Festival in Portsmouth.

Before she got involved with Broadway productions, she trained at the American Musical and Dramatic Academy in New York City. Stiles is known for her two roles in the Off-Broadway production Avenue Q, the story of a college student who moves to New York City with big dreams but lives on Avenue Q and has very little money. Stiles plays Kate Monster and Lucy the Slut, who are two puppets that she controls throughout the show.

After Stiles spent much of her time in the production of Avenue Q, she later was offered the role of Joanne in Vanities, a project that Stiles had been involved with for two years. Vanities was performed at the Pasadena Playhouse in Pasadena, California, but eventually moved to Second Stage in New York. This role in Vanities eventually led Stiles to be involved in recording an album for the songs.

She played the role of Little Red Riding Hood in Stephen Sondheim and James Lapine's musical Into the Woods at the Delacorte Theater in New York as part of Shakespeare in the Park. She starred opposite Academy Award nominee Amy Adams and Tony Award winners Donna Murphy and Denis O'Hare.

In 2017, Stiles appeared in the Epix television series Get Shorty. Stiles also appeared in the 2018 film Unsane. Additionally in 2018, Stiles was cast in the recurring role of Axe Capital stock trader Bonnie Barella on the Showtime series Billions (season 3–6).

She appeared in the stage musical version of the film Tootsie beginning in September 2018, which ran at the Cadillac Palace Theatre in Chicago from September 11 to October 14, 2018. The musical opened on Broadway in April 2019. In the third season of the Epix television series Get Shorty, Stiles' character, Gladys Parrish, a singer/actress, is cast in the Broadway musical Tootsie playing the character Stiles actually played in the musical. This plot development allowed Stiles to recreate one of her numbers from the Broadway show on the TV series.

== Discography ==
Along with having performed on many different stages in various off-Broadway shows, Stiles has found the time to be involved in three different albums for three plays. Her first album recording was singing for the role of Joanne, for the musical, Vanities the Musical. Her second album recording was when she sang the character Nazirah for the musical, The Road to Qatar. Most recently, she can be heard on the album for the musical adaptation of Roald Dahl's James and the Giant Peach as the Spider. In 2016, she teamed up with Gary Lucas to record Gary Lucas' Fleischerei: Music from Max Fleischer Cartoons. In 2020, she released her first EP, You Can Ukulele With Me. On that album, Stiles shows her skill at playing the ukulele, an instrument she has been known to play: in one episode of Get Shorty, Stiles played the ukulele for two songs (one of which, "Simple Song of Love (The La La Song)", was performed for her show Squirrel Heart, and would show up in re-recorded form as the lead-off track from You Can Ukulele With Me); and she played it in the aforementioned Squirrel Heart show.

Aside from album recordings, Stiles and her friend Howie have been working on their sketches for their comedy channel on YouTube. The YouTube channel is called Sillyocity, and together, the two of them combine their ideas to make short comedic webisodes.

== Theatre credits ==
Year	Production	Role	Venue	Notes
2001	Titanic	Kate Mullins	Multiple venues	Non-Equity tour
2002	The Wizard of Oz	Dorothy Gale	North Shore Music Theatre	Regional
2003	Grease	Frenchy	Paper Mill Playhouse	Regional
2003	Summer	Ensemble	Musical Theatre Works	Reading
2005	Captain Louie	Ensemble	York Theatre	Off-Broadway
2005	The Full Monty	Estelle Genovese	North Shore Music Theatre	Regional
2006	What a Glorious Feeling	Performer	Roundabout Theatre Studios	Reading
2006	Doctor Dolittle	Polynesia	Multiple venues	National tour
Unknown	The 25th Annual Putnam County Spelling Bee	Marcy Park/Olive Ostrovsky/Logainne Schwartzandgrubenierre understudies	Circle in the Square Theatre	Broadway
Unknown	The 25th Annual Putnam County Spelling Bee	Logainne Schwartzandgrubenierre	Multiple venues	National tour
2007–2008	Avenue Q	Kate Monster/Lucy the Slut	John Golden Theatre	Broadway
2009	Vanities, A New Musical	Joanne	Second Stage Theater	Off-Broadway
2011	The Road to Qatar	Nazirah	York Theatre Company	Off-Broadway
2011–2012	On a Clear Day You Can See Forever	Muriel Bunson	St. James Theatre	Broadway
2014	Hand to God	Jessica	Lucille Lortel Theatre	Off-Broadway
2015–2016	Hand to God	Jessica	Booth Theatre	Broadway
2016	Do I Hear a Waltz?	Giovanna	New York City Center	Concert
2018	Tootsie	Sandy Lester	Cadillac Palace Theatre	Regional
2019	Tootsie	Sandy Lester	Marquis Theatre	Broadway
2023	A Transparent Musical	Sarah Pfefferman/Queerdo	Mark Taper Forum	Regional
2026	Iceboy!	Lambert	Goodman Theatre	Chicago

== Filmography ==
=== Film ===
Year	Title	Role	Notes
2018	Unsane	Jill	
2021	Here Today	Sarah	
2023	Transformers: Rise of the Beasts	Jillian Robinson	

=== Television ===
Year	Title	Role	Notes
2012-2013	Lab Rats	Edie, White House representative	Episodes: "Commando App", "Memory Wipe"
2016	The Blacklist	Receptionist	Episode: "Dr. Adrian Shaw: Conclusion"
2017	Superior Donuts	Dana	Recurring role
2017	I'm Dying Up Here	Toni Luddy	Episode: "Sugar and Spice"
2017–2019	Get Shorty	Gladys	22 episodes
2017–2018	Sunny Day	Lacey (voice)	3 episodes
2018	Half Life	Patty	Episode: "Pilot"
2018	My Astronaut	Sarah Pevsner	3 episodes
2018–2022	Billions	Bonnie Barella	25 episodes
2018	Dietland	Suzy	Episode: "Pilot"
2019	Steven Universe: The Movie	Spinel (voice)	Television film
2020	Steven Universe Future	Spinel (voice)	2 episodes
2021	The Crew	Beth Paige	10 episodes
2022	The Marvelous Mrs. Maisel	Angry Wife	Episode: "Ethan... Esther... Chaim"
2024–present	Hazbin Hotel	Mimzy (voice)	Episode: "Dad Beat Dad"

== Awards and nominations ==
Year	Awards	Category	Work	Result
2015	Tony Awards	Best Featured Actress in a Play	Hand to God	Nominated
2019	Clarence Derwent Awards	Most Promising Female	Tootsie	Won
2019	Outer Critics Circle Awards	Outstanding Featured Actress in a Musical	Tootsie	Nominated
2019	Drama Desk Awards	Outstanding Featured Actress in a Musical	Tootsie	Nominated
2019	Tony Awards	Best Featured Actress in a Musical	Tootsie	Nominated
2019	Annie Awards	Best Voice Acting TV/Media	Steven Universe: The Movie	Nominated
