= Steven Universe Future =

American animated television series

- Genre: Action; Comedy-drama; Coming of age; Musical; Science fantasy; Psychological drama
- Created by: Rebecca Sugar
- Showrunner: Rebecca Sugar
- Directed by: Kat Morris; Alonso Ramirez Ramos
- Voices of: Zach Callison; Estelle; Michaela Dietz; Deedee Magno Hall; Shelby Rabara
- Theme music composer: Rebecca Sugar; Aivi & Surasshu
- Opening theme: "Steven Universe Future" by: Zach Callison, Estelle, Michaela Dietz, Deedee; Magno Hall, Shelby Rabara, Uzo Aduba & Jennifer Paz
- Ending theme: "Being Human" by Emily King
- Composers: Aivi & Surasshu; Jeff Ball; Jeff Liu
- Country of origin: United States
- Original language: English
- No. of episodes: 20

Production
- Executive producers: Rebecca Sugar; Tramm Wigzell; Jennifer Pelphrey; Brian A. Miller; Rob Sorcher
- Producer: Jackie Buscarino
- Running time: 11 minutes
- Production company: Cartoon Network Studios

Original release
- Network: Cartoon Network
- Release: December 7, 2019 – March 27, 2020

Related
- Steven Universe; Steven Universe: The Movie

Steven Universe Future is an American animated series created by Rebecca Sugar for Cartoon Network. It serves as an epilogue to Steven Universe (2013–2019) and a follow-up to its television film sequel Steven Universe: The Movie (2019). It premiered on December 7, 2019, and concluded on March 27, 2020.

The series focuses on the aftermath of the events of Steven Universe, where extraterrestrial magical Gems coexist in harmony with humans after the end of the war between the Crystal Gems and Gem Homeworld. Without the threats of the Diamonds or corrupted Gems, Steven must deal with the everyday challenges that still come with his now relatively peaceful life, and question his new life objectives.

Like the original series, Steven Universe Future received critical praise for its design, music, voice acting, characterization, and prominent LGBT themes. The series was also praised for addressing issues some had with the original series, as well as for choosing to focus on the aftermath of the main story's climax and promoting mental health awareness through Steven's experience with psychological trauma. The episode "Fragments" was nominated for the 2020 Primetime Emmy Award for Short Form Animated Program.

== Premise ==
Flag of Earth as displayed in the series

The series is set after the events of Steven Universe: The Movie, which itself takes place two years after the Steven Universe series finale "Change Your Mind". In "Change Your Mind", teenage protagonist Steven persuaded the Diamonds, the rulers of the intergalactic Gem empire, to cease their abusive, imperialist ways, and to heal the monstrous corrupted Gems that had been menacing the planet Earth. Now, Steven and his friends and family, the Crystal Gems, have constructed Little Homeworld, a community on Earth where humans and Gems can live in harmony. Steven now dedicates his time to inviting Gems to come to "Little Homeschool", and educating those who do not know how to find their new place in the galaxy.

Steven Universe Future follows Steven's everyday life trying to help Gems find new purpose; it also depicts the disappointments he faces with his new life, including the realization that there are things he cannot fix and his own feelings of aimlessness after successfully liberating the Gem empire. He confronts old foes who are looking for revenge, tries to master a new power that he doesn't fully understand, and is challenged to decide what he wants for his own future.

== Voice cast and characters ==
=== Main ===
- Zach Callison as Steven Universe/Monster Steven, Onion, Cactus Steven, and Jingle Singer
- Estelle Swaray as Garnet
- Michaela Dietz as Amethyst, and other Quartz Gems
- Deedee Magno Hall as Pearl, Pink Pearl/Volleyball, Shell, Brandish, Mega Pearl and Aubergine Pearl
- Shelby Rabara as Peridot

=== Recurring ===
- Tom Scharpling as Greg Universe
- Grace Rolek as Connie Maheswaran
- Lo Mutac (Note: Credited as Charlyne Yi) as Ruby, Eyeball, and other Rubies
- Erica Luttrell as Sapphire
- Jennifer Paz as Lapis Lazuli and other Lapises
- Miriam A. Hyman as Bismuth (in "Everything's Fine", "I Am My Monster" & "The Future")
- Kimberly Brooks as Jasper and other Quartz gems
- Sarah Stiles as Spinel
- Christine Ebersole as White Diamond
- Patti LuPone as Yellow Diamond
- Lisa Hannigan as Blue Diamond
- Michelle Maryk as Larimar
- Dee Bradley Baker as Lion

=== Guest ===
- Uzo Aduba as Bismuth (in "Bismuth Casual") and Khadijah
- Matthew Moy as Lars Barriga
- Kate Micucci as Sadie Miller
- Reagan Gomez-Preston as Jenny Pizza
- Brian Posehn as Sour Cream
- Mary Elizabeth McGlynn as Priyanka Maheswaran
- Lamar Abrams as Wy-Six, Jaime, and Daniel
- Indya Moore as Shep
- Johnny Hawkes as Rodrigo and Cookie Cat
- Marieve Herington as Jasmine
- Tahani Anderson as Patricia
- Ian Jones-Quartey as Snowflake Obsidian
- Natasha Lyonne as Smoky Quartz
- Alastair James as Rainbow Quartz 2.0
- Shoniqua Shandai as Sunstone
- Christine Pedi as Holly Blue Agate
- Della Saba as Aquamarine
- Larissa Gallagher as Bluebird Azurite
- Chris Jai Alex as Drew the Dog and Announcer
- Jemaine Clement as Kerry Moonbeam

Archival recordings and footage of Susan Egan as Rose Quartz/Pink Diamond are utilized.

== Episodes ==
The series consisted of a total of 20 11-minute episodes, with a four-part finale that aired on March 27, 2020.

All episodes were supervised directed by Kat Morris and Alonso Ramirez Ramos, with Liz Artinian directing all of the art. The art was also co-directed by Patrick Bryson for the first four episodes.

No.	Title	Animation directed by	Written and storyboarded by	Original release date	Prod. code	U.S. viewers (millions)
1	"Little Homeschool"	Haesung Park	Drew Green & Paul Villeco	December 7, 2019	001	0.81
Steven and the Gems have opened up Little Homeschool, a place where Gems can learn to integrate into Earth society. Meanwhile, Jasper, still bitter about having lost her purpose, is living in self-imposed exile in the woods. Steven's attempt to reason with her escalates into a fight, during which he develops new powerful abilities.
2	"Guidance"	Ki-Yong Bae & Jin-Hee Park	Aaron Austin & Amish Kumar	December 7, 2019	002	0.80
Amethyst has started a new program wherein Gems choose jobs in Beach City. While happy with the effort, Steven is unhappy that most have chosen jobs that resemble what they did on Homeworld. He attempts to open them up to new experiences by assigning them different occupations, but this results in panic and destruction as the Gems work at jobs they are unsuited for.
3	"Rose Buds"	Seungwook Shin, Sangun Jeon & Sangman Park	Lamar Abrams & Adam Muto	December 7, 2019	003	0.84
The Rose Quartzes that Pink Diamond created to resemble her Rose Quartz persona travel to Beach City to visit Steven. He, Greg, and the Crystal Gems are uncomfortable around the Rose Quartzes due to one of them having the same appearance as Steven's deceased mother; but Steven doesn't have the heart to ask them to leave.
4	"Volleyball"	Ki-Yong Bae & Eun-Ok Choi	Etienne Guignard & Maya Petersen	December 7, 2019	004	0.76
Pink Diamond's original Pearl, nicknamed Volleyball, has a crack on her face that is impossible to heal, even after Steven and Pearl take her to the Reef, a Pearl repair station. At the Reef, a new conflict ensues when Volleyball explains how Pink Diamond caused the crack.
5	"Bluebird"	Ki-Yong Bae & Jin-Hee Park	Lamar Abrams & Miki Brewster	December 14, 2019	005	0.71
Aquamarine and Eyeball Ruby seek revenge on Steven for ruining their careers. This leads them to fuse into Bluebird Azurite, who arrives in Beach City and pulls a series of pranks against Steven; the others warm up to her, but Steven has difficulty trusting her, and his suspicions are proven correct when Bluebird takes Greg hostage.
6	"A Very Special Episode"	Seungwook Shin, Sangun Jeon & Sangman Park	Aaron Austin & Amish Kumar	December 14, 2019	006	0.71
Steven has fused with Pearl to babysit Onion on the same day that he is scheduled to fuse with Garnet to teach a safety seminar. Steven rushes between fusions to try to fulfill both obligations, becoming stressed that he cannot do both activities at the same time. The episode is ultimately revealed to be a safety video hosted by Sunstone herself about the dangers of poor time management.
7	"Snow Day"	Haesung Park	Etienne Guignard & Maya Petersen	December 21, 2019	007	0.72
Steven is becoming overworked running Little Homeschool and is spending less time with Garnet, Amethyst, and Pearl; their attempts to hang out with him fall flat as they keep planning activities he has outgrown. When an overnight snowstorm forces Steven to close Little Homeschool for the day, the Gems try to use this as a bonding opportunity by playing a game of "Steven Tag" against his will.
8	"Why So Blue?"	Seungwook Shin, Sangun Jeon & Sangman Park	Warren Fok, Joe Johnston & Amish Kumar	December 21, 2019	008	0.67
Steven and Lapis visit an alien planet being terraformed by a pair of other Lapis Lazulis and try to convince them to find other ways of expressing themselves. Their efforts prove difficult, and Lapis soon becomes agitated at how much they remind her of her former disregard for life.
9	"Little Graduation"	Ki-Yong Bae & Eun-Ok Choi	Drew Green & Paul Villeco	December 28, 2019	009	0.41
As the Off-Colors graduate from Little Homeschool, Steven learns that Sadie Killer and the Suspects have broken up to pursue their own interests; Sadie is now dating a new partner, Shep; and Lars has decided to leave his bakery in Beach City and return to space. Worried that his friends are drifting away from him, Steven literally tries to keep everyone together.
10	"Prickly Pair"	Haesung Park	Drew Green & Paul Villeco	December 28, 2019	010	0.49
Steven resigns from Little Homeschool, and unhealthily takes up gardening as a hobby. He accidentally brings a cactus to life, which soon begins to look like and imitate him by repeating his innermost feelings. Things get out of control when "Cactus Steven" grows into a monster while acting out Steven's aggression.
11	"In Dreams"	Seungwook Shin, Sangun Jeon & Sangman Park	Etienne Guignard & Maya Petersen	March 6, 2020	011	0.54
Steven and Peridot watch a reboot of their favorite show, Camp Pining Hearts, and are dismayed by the new characters and plotlines. When they discover that Steven is capable of projecting his dreams onto the television screen, they try to use this as an opportunity to create new episodes of Camp Pining Hearts more to their liking; but Steven's anxiety prevents his subconscious from following the script.
12	"Bismuth Casual"	Ki-Yong Bae & Jin-Hee Park	Lamar Abrams & Miki Brewster	March 6, 2020	012	0.51
Steven, Connie, Pearl, and Bismuth head to the skating rink together. Steven is introduced to Connie's friends from cram school, but finds himself awkwardly detached from humans. Pearl tries to get Bismuth to socialize with humans, but Bismuth confides in Steven that she only came to spend time with Pearl while convincing Steven to assert his friendship with Connie.
13	"Together Forever"	Ki-Yong Bae & Choi Eunok	Etienne Guignard & Maya Petersen	March 13, 2020	013	0.57
When Steven learns that Connie is going to be leaving Beach City for college, he realizes he can't visualize his future without her. He asks Ruby and Sapphire for advice, and becomes convinced that their kind of marriage is the only way to keep Connie close to him.
14	"Growing Pains"	Ki-Yong Bae & Park Jinhui	Drew Green & Paul Villeco	March 13, 2020	014	0.55
After Connie rejects his proposal, Steven's body begins deforming and swelling up to massive size. Connie's mother, a physician, examines Steven and concludes that he is suffering physical consequences of the emotional trauma he experienced as a child.
15	"Mr. Universe"	Ki-Yong Bae & Eunok Choi	Warren Fok, Joe Johnston & Amish Kumar	March 20, 2020	015	0.50
Greg takes Steven on a road trip in an attempt to help him figure out what he wants out of life. They end up at Greg's childhood home, where Steven learns that Greg rebelled against his restrictive parents. While Greg encourages Steven to find his own path, Steven envies Greg for having grown up with structure and supervision. Steven loses some respect for Greg for giving him too much freedom.
16	"Fragments"	Haesung Park	Lamar Abrams & Miki Brewster	March 20, 2020	016	0.53
With Steven's condition worsening, he runs away from home and turns to Jasper for help in taking control of his powers. Jasper's training methods prove to be too effective, however, and her rematch with Steven leads to her being shattered. Steven uses the essences of the Diamonds to repair her, and when she reforms, she bows to him as her Diamond.
17	"Homeworld Bound" (Part 1)	Ki-Yong Bae & Choi Eunok	Drew Green & Paul Villeco	March 27, 2020 (Note: This episode was first released on the Cartoon Network app and website on March 23, 2020.)	017	0.69
Steven flees to Homeworld to ask the Diamonds for advice about his condition. He finds them doing the opposite of what they used to do: Yellow Diamond fixes broken Gems, Blue Diamond makes people happy, and White Diamond lets other beings control her. After Steven attempts to hurt White Diamond while controlling her body, his condition worsens and he flees again.
18	"Everything's Fine" (Part 2)	Seungwook Shin, Sangun Jeon & Sangman Park	Amish Kumar & Maya Petersen	March 27, 2020	018	0.71
After coming back from Homeworld unsettled, Steven insists that everything is fine. Things prove otherwise, however, as he attempts to be helpful around Little Homeschool; his denial of his problems and lack of control over his powers causes havoc. When finally confronted at home by his concerned loved ones, it's the last straw, Steven sees himself as a monster just like his mother and loses control.
19	"I Am My Monster" (Part 3)	Haesung Park	Etienne Guignard & Miki Brewster	March 27, 2020	019	0.80
In his emotional meltdown, Steven has transformed into a giant monster and is in danger of destroying Beach City. Everyone scrambles to help him and protect the town, including Spinel, the Diamonds, and even the Cluster. Ultimately, Connie convinces them that they need to be there for Steven and emotionally support him as he always has for them.
20	"The Future" (Part 4)	Ki-Yong Bae & Jinhui Park	Lamar Abrams & Miki Brewster	March 27, 2020	020	0.74
A few months following his meltdown, Steven, now back to normal, is preparing to leave Beach City and start a new journey in life. He is disappointed that Pearl, Garnet and Amethyst are taking his departure in stride and acting like they won't miss him. Just as he is about to leave, he finally confronts the three and they admit that they have been holding their emotions back so as not to dissuade him from leaving. Steven finally moves on, knowing they will always remain a part of his life.

== Production ==
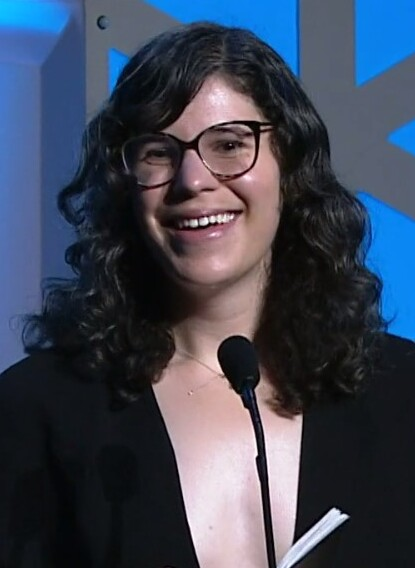
Rebecca Sugar, creator of Steven Universe Future

According to Rebecca Sugar, when she was notified in 2016 that Steven Universe would be canceled after the end of the fifth season, she prevailed upon Cartoon Network to allow her to produce the followup film, Steven Universe: The Movie. When Cartoon Network approved the movie, they also green-lighted an additional season of episodes that the movie could serve to promote; 6 of the 26 additional episodes were used to extend the original series' fifth season in order to wrap up the story, and the remaining 20 became Steven Universe Future.

=== Writing ===
In April 2022, Kate Tsang, a series writer, and for Adventure Time: Distant Lands, said that for the series she could write what she "wanted to see". She also stated that the series had a "heart to it" and optimism which she incorporated into her 2022 film, Marvelous and the Black Hole. It was also said that the series helping Tsang with how she approached her rewrites.

=== Music ===
The opening theme, "Steven Universe Future", is a new version of the song "Happily Ever After" from Steven Universe: The Movie, replacing "We Are the Crystal Gems" from the original series. The show's main voice actors, Zach Callison (Steven), Estelle (Garnet), Michaela Dietz (Amethyst) and Deedee Magno Hall (Pearl), who had performed both the opening of the original series and "Happily Ever After" in The Movie, perform "Steven Universe Future" alongside additional cast members Jennifer Paz (Lapis), Shelby Rabara (Peridot), Uzo Aduba (Bismuth) and Grace Rolek (Connie)

=== LGBTQ representation ===
Like its precursor, the series has many examples of queer and non-binary representation.

Sadie's romantic interest, Shep, is a person of color who is referred to with gender neutral language including the singular they pronoun, and who is voiced by Transgender actress Indya Moore. Unlike Stevonnie, Shep is the show's first non-binary character who is fully human. Reviewers argue that this could mean Sadie is not heterosexual. Den of Geek states, "Straight people can obviously date non-binary people but...Sadie is more than likely queer and that's incredible."

During the episode Bismuth Casual, Stevonnie, the intersex and non-binary fusion of Steven and Connie, appears.

In "Volleyball", Pink Pearl (nicknamed "Volleyball") reminisces romantically over Pink Diamond, to which Pearl sneers, "Looks like someone's still got it bad", insinuating that - like Pearl once did - Pink Pearl still harbors romantic feelings towards the late Pink Diamond. However, it is later revealed that Pink Diamond physically abused Pink Pearl, causing irreparable psychological trauma that is reflected in Pink Pearl's physical form as a head injury. In "Bismuth Casual", Bismuth indirectly confesses she has a crush on Pearl. Both characters are female-coded and use feminine pronouns, like all gems, though some sources argue that all gems are non-binary, as they are "genderless sentient aliens".

In 2020, Maya Peterson, a storyboarder for the show, stated that Peridot's disinterest in fusion is meant to represent asexuality and aromanticism, despite Peterson's reservations that she is only a secondary creator of the show. Before (and after this point), fans had shipped Peridot with various other characters, specifically Lapis Lazuli and Amethyst, some reviewers even seeing Peridot and Lapis in a "close, loving relationship" in 2018 when the two characters lived together in a barn. The announcement of Peridot's asexuality/aromanticism pleased many fans. Peterson also stated that the show's writers did not discuss whether or not Peridot was autistic, although it was a possibility, and many fans perceived Peridot to be on the spectrum. When Rebecca Sugar, who created the character, was asked if Peridot might be autistic, she said that she doesn't think of any of the gems as neurotypical, and that she's thrilled autistic viewers can relate to Peridot.

In addition to LGBTQ characters, the series also engages in camp, an aesthetic sensibility historically associated with LGBTQ culture, to tackle complex issues such as decolonization.

== Release ==
=== Announcement ===
Prior to the announcement of Future, Sugar and the crew of Steven Universe stayed silent regarding a potential sixth season of Steven Universe, leaving fans with uncertainty over the future of the series, with some believing The Movie to be the conclusion of Steven's story; at New York Comic Con in October 2019, Sugar confirmed that there would be no sixth season of Steven Universe (therefore retroactively confirming the season 5 finale "Change Your Mind" as the series finale), but announced Future, and shared the opening of the epilogue limited series with the audience. Several media outlets misinterpreted the announcement as a confirmation of a sixth season, with Future as a simple sub-title.

The official premise of the show was: "After saving the universe, Steven is still at it, tying up every loose end. But as he runs out of other people's problems to solve, he'll finally have to face his own."

=== Broadcast ===
Steven Universe Future premiered on December 7, 2019 on Cartoon Network. It premiered on Cartoon Network UK on December 23, 2019.

=== Home media ===
On December 8, 2020, all 20 episodes of the series were released on the Steven Universe: The Complete Collection DVD, alongside the entirety of the original series and the movie.

== Reception ==
Steven Universe Future has been acclaimed by critics. Like the original series and Steven Universe: The Movie, the characterization, themes, animation, voice acting, music, and LGBT representation have been widely praised; Future in particular is praised for its new ways of exploring previously developed themes (in particular Steven's dedication to solve other characters' problems), and its unconventional choice of focusing on the smaller-scale aftermath of the main storyline. Reviewers have pointed out that it addresses issues several fans and reviewers had with the original series, such as its perceived tendency to solve characters' problems in overly simple ways and to redeem all antagonists.

Caroline Cao of /Film called Steven Universe Future "a messy and beautiful tale of trauma, healing, and survival", stating: "Sugar and her team are the greatest visual maximalists in animation, pushing imageries to their most emotional and thematic extremes—particularly through the inventiveness of the flexible Fusion metaphor—and unraveling difficult revelations about surviving trauma." She praised the exploration of Steven's tendency to help other people with their problems, claiming that "Steven faces the reoccurring lesson of 'biting more than you can chew.' Steven wants to heal everyone, anything, but falls short, and even unleashes destruction at times. As Future moves forward, Steven will contend with his own management of the new world order he has created, and his mother's past will continue to haunt his future. Then there's the matter of Steven's newest Gem power that manifests through his rage and insecurities. Steven Universe Future is on a roll in delivering hard and relevant messages about victimhood and survivorhood solidarity. There are kids and adults alike who need someone to tell them 'I'm sorry for not believing you'."

The Mary Sue labeled Steven Universe Future "fantastic", praising "the amazing storytelling" and the "beautiful" animation. Reuben Baron of CBR praised the series for "challenging Steven's savior mentality", stating that the first four episodes were "developing a clear thematic throughline. Picking up the loose ends from the original series, it's working to address criticisms of Steven as a character without betraying the show's essential ethos." In his review of the episode "Bluebird", Shamus Kelley of Den of Geek stated that Future "finally addressed something of a complaint many had towards the series. As much as Steven Universe is all about love being the answer and Steven trying to be friends with everyone, there's still a nagging sense that it's all a bit... simple. Obviously what Steven and the Crystal Gems is incredibly taxing [sic] but the end result just being everyone is mostly friends? That's fairly unrealistic [...] So the fact that Aquamarine and Eyeball Ruby just flat out hate him? It's an acknowledgement, one that show takes it time to make explicit, that not everyone wants to change. Not everyone is down for learning to love and be friends".

Charles Pulliam-Moore of Gizmodo heavily praised Steven Universe Future for further establishing Pink Diamond/Rose Quartz as "the villain of the decade", stating "When Steven Universe Future reveals exactly how Volleyball, the Pink Pearl, got her cracked face, the series is cluing viewers into the specific reasons why the other Diamonds were reluctant to give Pink what she wanted. It wasn't just that she was inexperienced, but rather she was inexperienced, dangerous, and all too capable of letting her powers run wild in ways that would actively harm others. [...] You see just how Not Over™ Pink basically all of the Gems still are. Pink's legacy is one of the lasting, seemingly unending sadness that the other Gems are attempting to work through. The majority of them don't feel much ill will toward her, but she's still hurting them in ways that only the dead and dearly missed can. There are Gems like Spinel who have all the reasons in the galaxy to hate Pink, but that's not really where any of the people in the series are coming from. Rather, everyone's in different stages of mourning and not a single one of them can really be sure if and when the pain they're dealing with is going to go away."

The introduction of Shep, a non-binary character who appears in the episode "Little Graduation" and is played by non-binary actor Indya Moore, received attention from various outlets. The Mary Sue stated that with Future, Steven Universe "continues to be one of the most wonderfully diverse shows on television. We got to see in 'Little Graduation' a new human character named Shep—who is non-binary and voiced by a non-binary voice actor, Pose's Indya Moore—canonically queer couples, and one of them being a brown-skinned person!". /Film stated about the episode "Little Graduation": "what a fine way to wrap up 2019 by pushing the bar for queer representation through the introduction of the loveably chill Shep [...] They pop as the sort of character who has earned a Fan Favorite Title. Despite knowing the titular character for an hour, Shep participates in the proceedings by cooling down Steven."

100% of 7 critic reviews compiled by review aggregator website Rotten Tomatoes are positive, and the average rating is 10/10.

=== Awards and nominations ===
Year	Award	Category	Nominee(s)	Result	Ref.
2020	Primetime Emmy Awards	Outstanding Short Form Animated Program	Jennifer Pelphrey, Brian A. Miller, Rob Sorcher, Tramm Wigzell, Rebecca Sugar, Kat Morris, Alonso Ramirez Ramos, Jackie Buscarino, Lamar Abrams, Miki Brewster, Jack Pendarvis, Kate Tsang, Taneka Stotts, Joe Johnston, Hilary Florido, Nick DeMayo, Maureen Mlynarczyk and Sarah Gencarelli (for "Fragments")	Nominated	
2021	32nd GLAAD Media Awards	Outstanding Kids & Family Programming	Steven Universe (Note: For episodes of Future aired during eligibility year)	Nominated	

== Future ==
While Rebecca Sugar has confirmed that this is the series finale of the franchise and that there is no continuation in development, nor any ongoing projects, she has hinted that possible future stories exist. "The story is continuing off screen and I do know what happens next...But I would have to decide how and when I'd want to dig into that, or if it's best to give them their privacy."

Sugar later told Fast Company: "I'm certainly interested in spending more time in this world with these characters. But the thing about Steven Universe, it's about Steven Universe and I want to give him the time to heal", [Sugar says.] "I want to give that to my team as well. So I'm not really sure for certain what's going to happen in the future. I have a few ideas, but I'm going to take a little time to reevaluate everything before I jump into them." When asked by TVLine, Sugar responded similarly, "I love these characters and this world, and I have theories about the timelines that follow Future. But I want to give the characters some time and some privacy, at least for a while. I need a little of that too."

In November 2023, Sugar reiterated her desire for a potential revival, suggesting that the show would come back if the public demand is high, adding, "I love these characters and I love this world, and I would love to return to it. And I hope, if everyone else feels the same as I do, I may have an opportunity to do something like that."

In June 2025, a spin-off titled Steven Universe: Lars of the Stars was announced.
