= Steven Universe: The Movie =

2019 animated television film

- Promotional release poster
- Genre: Action; Science fantasy; Comedy-drama; Musical
- Based on: Steven Universe by Rebecca Sugar
- Written by: Lamar Abrams; Miki Brewster; Danny Kilgore; Hilary Florido; Joe Johnston; Amish Kumar; Jeff Liu; Katie Mitroff; Kat Morris; Chris Pianka; Maddie Queripel; Rebecca Sugar; Paul Villeco
- Story by: Ben Levin; Hilary Florido; Ian Jones-Quartey; Jack Pendarvis; Joe Johnston; Kat Morris; Matt Burnett; Rebecca Sugar
- Directed by: Rebecca Sugar
- Starring: Zach Callison; Estelle; Michaela Dietz; Deedee Magno Hall; Sarah Stiles
- Music by: Rebecca Sugar; Aivi & Surasshu; Stemage; Estelle; Gallant; Aimee Mann; Ted Leo; Lena Raine; Jeff Liu; James Fauntleroy; Macie Stewart; Mike Krol; Jeff Ball; Julian "Zorsy" Sanchez; Chance the Rapper
- Composers: Aivi & Surasshu; Jeff Ball; Stemage
- Country of origin: United States
- Original language: English

Production
- Executive producer: Rebecca Sugar
- Producer: Jackie Buscarino
- Editor: Paul Douglas
- Running time: 82 minutes
- Production companies: Warner Animation Group; Cartoon Network Studios

Original release
- Network: Cartoon Network
- Release: September 2, 2019

Related
- Steven Universe Future

Steven Universe: The Movie is a 2019 American animated musical science fantasy comedy-drama television film and a sequel to the television series of the same name, taking place two years after the series finale "Change Your Mind". Directed and co-written by series creator Rebecca Sugar with co-direction by Joe Johnston and Kat Morris, the film stars Zach Callison, Estelle, Michaela Dietz, and Deedee Magno Hall returning from the series, joined by Sarah Stiles. Its plot follows the Crystal Gems as they attempt to save all organic life on Earth from a deranged gem named Spinel with a history with Steven's mother.

The film was announced at San Diego Comic-Con 2018, and a short teaser trailer was later released on Cartoon Network's YouTube channel. At San Diego Comic-Con 2019, an official trailer was released, along with the announcement of a making-of documentary bundled with the film's DVD. The film premiered on Cartoon Network on September 2, 2019, to 1.57 million viewers. It was the first Cartoon Network original film since Regular Show: The Movie (2015). The film was followed by the epilogue limited series Steven Universe Future (2019–2020).

== Plot ==
After an introduction from the Diamonds ("The Tale of Steven"), Steven Universe, now 16 years old, greets the citizens of the Gem Empire. The Diamonds want him to stay to fulfill his mother Pink Diamond's role as a leader alongside them ("Let Us Adore You"), but Steven refuses. Back on Earth, the Crystal Gems celebrate their newfound peace ("Happily Ever After"). Almost immediately, a giant drill lands on the hillside, and Spinel, a deranged and cartoonish Gem, appears, announcing her intent to kill Steven and the rest of the Earth ("Other Friends"). Using a scythe-like weapon, she "poofs" Pearl, Garnet, and Amethyst back into their gem forms. Her attacks also weaken Steven's Gem powers, though his body is unharmed. Steven eventually manages to poof Spinel with the scythe.

Steven calls his father, Greg, for help. The Gems regenerate their bodies (including Ruby and Sapphire separately), but their memories have been erased; Pearl assumes that she is Greg's servant ("system/BOOT.pearl_final(3).Info"). With her memories gone, Spinel is a goofy and happy-go-lucky Gem whose function is to entertain her companion. Steven seeks advice from Peridot, Lapis Lazuli, and Bismuth, and they try to raise Steven's spirits ("Who We Are"). Bismuth recognizes Spinel's weapon as a "Rejuvenator", a device used to reset the minds of rebellious Gems back to their default state. Spinel compares the situation to a puzzle, suggesting that they find the Gems' "missing pieces" to restore their memories, inspiring Steven to try to reenact Ruby and Sapphire's first fusion. Spinel's antics cause scaffolding to collapse, almost crushing Ruby. When Sapphire pushes her to safety, they fuse into Garnet ("Isn't It Love?"), but she still has no memory of her life.

After Steven recovers Amethyst's memory by reenacting experiences the two had together ("No Matter What"), Peridot discovers that Spinel's drill is injecting a toxic chemical that will kill all life on Earth. In a moment of panic, Steven attempts to remove the injector, but his weakened efforts only serve to accelerate the process. Realizing that Pearl is the only one who knows who Spinel is, the group takes her to a "Sadie Killer and the Suspects" concert, hoping their music will bring back her memories of rebellion ("Disobedient"), but Pearl insists that as long as Greg exists, she will obey him. Steven uses what little energy he has left to fuse with Greg ("Independent Together"), which enables Pearl to recover her memory. Overcome with sadness, Spinel flees; Pearl tells Steven that Spinel was once Pink Diamond's playmate.

Steven follows Spinel to a desolate garden in space, where she recovers her memory and reveals her backstory: when Pink Diamond began the Gem colonization of Earth and did not want Spinel to join her, she tricked Spinel into "playing a game", in which Spinel was to stand frozen in the garden. Spinel was left alone there for 6,000 years before learning that Pink Diamond no longer exists ("Drift Away"). Steven tells her that Pink was wrong to treat her that way, and she needs to find someone else who will treat her better ("Found").

Back in Beach City, Spinel turns off the injector, but when Steven begins shifting his attention back to everyone else, she accuses Steven of using her, suggesting he'll abandon her or wipe her memory again. Spinel, now seething with rage, turns the injector back on and attacks Steven. As he tries to explain the truth to her, Garnet recovers her memory ("True Kinda Love"). Steven sends the others to rescue the humans of Beach City while he confronts Spinel. Steven finally realizes why his Gem powers have not yet returned: his desire for an unchanging "happily ever after" has left him resistant to the notion of growth and change, which he needs to re-experience. Embracing this fact, he regains his powers and battles Spinel, trying to convince her that she too can change ("Change"). Their fight destroys the injector, and Spinel relents after realizing how much she hates what she has become.

The Diamonds suddenly arrive, intending to live on Earth with Steven. He introduces Spinel to them, and they take an immediate liking to her because of her goofy personality and how she reminds them of Pink Diamond ("Let Us Adore You (Reprise)"). The Diamonds accept her in place of Steven, and she happily goes with them, now with a family who will love her. Steven and his friends gather to rebuild Beach City, and he, Connie, Pearl, Garnet, Amethyst, and Greg perform a Takarazuka-style "Finale".

== Voice cast ==
- Zach Callison as Steven Universe, a 16-year-old Gem-human hybrid member of the Crystal Gems.
- Sarah Stiles as Spinel, the former playmate of Pink Diamond, Steven's late mother. She is drawn in a "rubber-hose" style of 1930s animation and originally had a childlike personality before becoming vengeful about Pink Diamond abandoning her.
- Michaela Dietz as Amethyst, one of the Crystal Gems.
- Deedee Magno Hall as Pearl, one of the original members of the Crystal Gems.
- Estelle as Garnet, a fusion who is the de facto leader of the Crystal Gems.
- Erica Luttrell as Sapphire, one of Garnet's components, a cool and collected precognitive Gem and spouse of Ruby.
- Lo Mutuc (Note: Credited as Charlyne Yi) as Ruby, one of Garnet's components, a hotheaded soldier Gem and spouse of Sapphire.
- Uzo Aduba as Bismuth, one of the original members of the Crystal Gems.
- Jennifer Paz as Lapis Lazuli, a member of the Crystal Gems who was formerly aligned with Homeworld.
- Shelby Rabara as Peridot, a member of the Crystal Gems who was formerly aligned with Homeworld.
- Grace Rolek as Connie Maheswaran, Steven's best friend turned girlfriend.
- Tom Scharpling as Greg Universe, Steven's father.
- Christine Ebersole as White Diamond, the leader of the Great Diamond Authority, who rules over the Gem race.
- Patti LuPone as Yellow Diamond, a member of the Great Diamond Authority.
- Lisa Hannigan as Blue Diamond, a member of the Great Diamond Authority.
- Matthew Moy as Lars Barriga, a friend of Steven.
- Kate Micucci as Sadie Miller, a friend of Steven.
- Ted Leo as Steg, the fusion of Steven and Greg Universe.
- Aimee Mann as Opal, the fusion of Pearl and Amethyst.
- Toks Olagundoye as Nanefua Pizza, the mayor of Beach City.

== Production ==
The film is a musical, with songs written by Steven Universe creator Rebecca Sugar featuring musical collaborations with Aivi & Surasshu, Chance the Rapper, Gallant, James Fauntleroy, Macie Stewart, Mike Krol, Grant Henry (Stemage), Jeff Liu, Jeff Ball, and Julian "Zorsy" Sanchez, as well as Estelle, Ted Leo, and Aimee Mann, who have voice roles. Lena Raine is also credited for song and score mixing. The film is executive produced by Rebecca Sugar. The co-executive producers are Chance the Rapper, Kat Morris, Joe Johnston, Alonso Ramirez Ramos and Ian Jones-Quartey. The film was directed by Rebecca Sugar, Kat Morris, and Joe Johnston. The story for the film was developed by Ben Levin, Hilary Florido, Ian Jones-Quartey, Jack Pendarvis, Joe Johnston, Kat Morris, Matt Burnett, and Rebecca Sugar.

== Marketing ==
The film was announced at San Diego Comic-Con 2018, and a short teaser trailer was later released on Cartoon Network's YouTube channel. A poster was released a week before San Diego Comic-Con 2019, revealing a glimpse of the film's antagonist and a visibly older Steven, setting the film two years after the events of "Change Your Mind".

At San Diego Comic-Con 2019, a trailer for the film was released, along with the announcement of a documentary based on the film's creation to be released along with the DVD.

Adult Swim's action-oriented Toonami block aired a second trailer for the film during their August 24 broadcast.

== Release ==
The film was released on September 2, 2019, on Cartoon Network; a three-day long Every Steven Ever marathon aired all-day (during Cartoon Network's standard broadcast hours only, ending for Adult Swim at 8:00 p.m. ET) starting at 6:00 a.m. ET on August 31, 2019, leading directly up to the film's premiere at 6:00 p.m. ET on September 2. A digital release followed on September 3, 2019. The film was released on DVD by Warner Bros. Home Entertainment on November 12, 2019; this release contains the documentary Behind the Curtain: The Making of Steven Universe: The Movie and animatics both with and without commentary. The film was later released on the Steven Universe: The Complete Collection DVD on December 8, 2020, alongside the entirety of the original series and Future.

=== Theatrical ===
Ahead of the film's television premiere, an early screening was held at The Theater at Ace Hotel in downtown Los Angeles on August 26, 2019. In Argentina, Paraguay and Uruguay, the film was released theatrically from October 24 to October 30, 2019, in Cinemark Theatres. Through its limited run, the film made $24,012 at the international box-office.

A one-night theatrical sing-along screening through Fathom Events was planned for March 23, 2020, including a premiere screening of an episode of Steven Universe Future, but the event was cancelled due to the COVID-19 pandemic. Instead, the sing-along edition of the film premiered on Cartoon Network on March 6, 2020, preceding 2 new episodes of Future, while the attached episode was released digitally on the event's original date.

== Reception ==
=== Viewership ===
Steven Universe: The Movie was seen by 1.57 million viewers on its original telecast, which was commercial-free. This made the film the highest-rated broadcast of the series in over three years.

=== Critical response ===
The film was universally acclaimed by critics prior to broadcast, with the music, animation and performance of Stiles highlighted in particular.

Rotten Tomatoes gives the film a 100% approval rating based on nine reviews with an average rating of 9.3/10.

Speaking of its effectiveness as a stand-alone story in Forbes, Dani Di Placido described the film as "both approachable to newcomers and deeply rewarding for longtime fans of the series". ComicBook.com's Rollin Bishop summarised that the film contains "amazing musical numbers with striking illustrations and breathtaking animation to outdo anything the franchise has attempted before", while Shamus Kelley of Den of Geek commented on the strong emotional content, saying that "this is a movie that will stick with you long after it's finished airing. Like the best entertainment, it holds up a mirror and lets you examine your life in a safe way".

=== Accolades ===
Year	Award	Category	Nominee(s)	Result
2019	Annie Awards	Best Voice Acting TV/Media	Sarah Stiles as "Spinel"	Nominated
2020	GLAAD Media Awards	Outstanding Kids & Family Programming	Steven Universe: The Movie	Nominated

== Soundtrack ==
The first single from the film's soundtrack, "True Kinda Love", performed by Estelle and Callison, was released on July 19, 2019. The soundtrack was released on September 2, 2019.

The soundtrack peaked at number 57 on the US Billboard 200 chart, number 6 on the Independent Albums chart, and number 5 on the Soundtracks chart. Additionally, two songs from the soundtrack charted on the Billboard Kid Digital Songs chart. "Other Friends" and "True Kinda Love" peaked at number 1 and number 8 respectively. The song "Happily Ever After" was later adapted into the title theme of the epilogue limited series Steven Universe Future. A deluxe version (featuring demo versions of a few songs) was released on November 15, 2019.
