= Steven Universe (character) =

Fictional character from the television series Steven Universe

- Steven Universe character
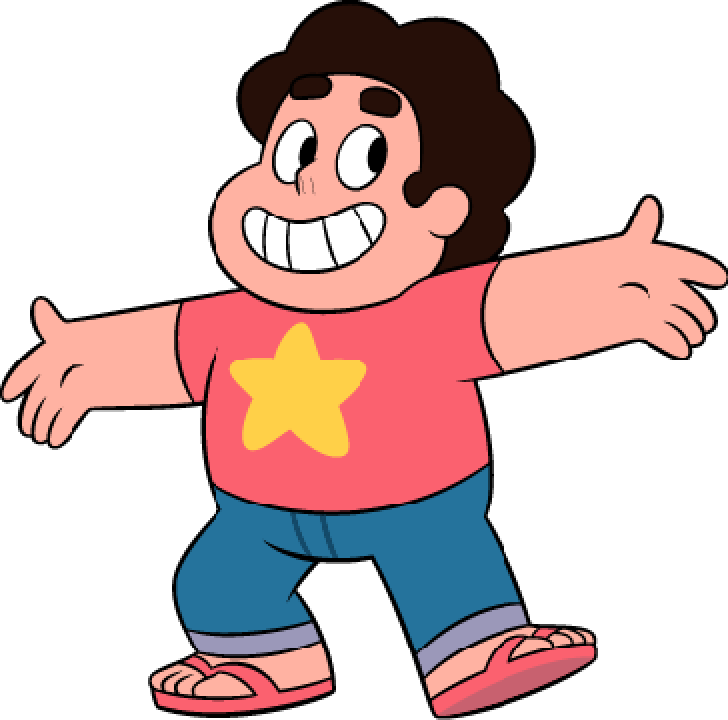
- Left: Steven's appearance in Steven Universe; Right: Steven's appearance in Steven Universe Future
- First appearance: "The Time Thing" (2013) (pilot debut) "Gem Glow" (2013) (proper series debut)
- Created by: Rebecca Sugar
- Based on: Steven Sugar
- Voiced by: List: Zach Callison; Daniel DiVenere (MultiVersus)

In-universe information
- Full name: Steven Quartz Cutiepie Danger Demayo Diamond Universe
- Species: Human-Gem hybrid
- Gender: Male
- Family: List: Greg Universe (father); Rose Quartz (mother)

Steven Quartz Universe is the eponymous protagonist of the American animated series Steven Universe, its epilogue series Steven Universe Future, and the film Steven Universe: The Movie, created by Rebecca Sugar. Steven is a hybrid between a normal human being and a "Gem", a fictional race of alien beings that exist as magical gemstones projecting bodies of light. Voiced by Zach Callison, he debuted in the series' pilot episode and made his main series debut in the first episode, "Gem Glow".

The show generally takes place around Steven's perspective: the audience always follows Steven and learns about the plot and backstory as he does. As such, the only scenes without the character are those that he sees as visions, that are told to him as stories or when he's fused and seeing through the eyes of the fusion.

The character was received positively, with his evolution through the series, ideology revolving around kindness and empathy, and gender non-conformity receiving most praise.

== Creation ==
Steven was created by Rebecca Sugar, with his appearance and name based on Rebecca Sugar's brother Steven Sugar, a background artist for the show. During the development of the pilot, Rebecca Sugar had a conversation with Hellboy creator Mike Mignola in which he emphasized the importance of repetitive imagery to create a motif. This inspired Steven's iconic star t-shirt.

== Role within the series ==
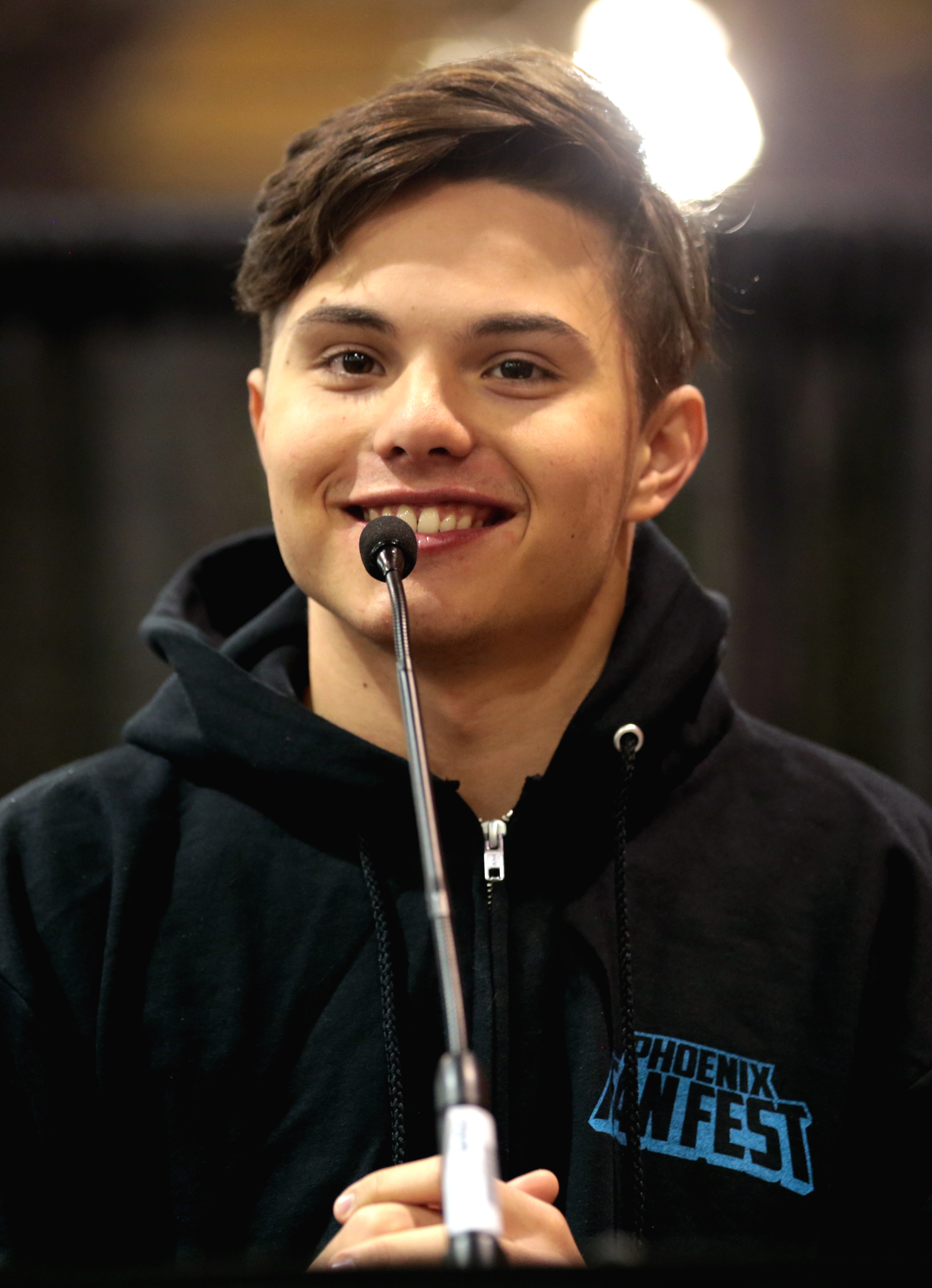
Zach Callison, Steven's voice actor.

Steven, in his early teens when the series begins, is the youngest member of the Crystal Gems. He is the first and only known Gem–human hybrid, the product of the union between the Crystal Gems' original leader, Rose Quartz, and Greg Universe, a human musician and car-wash owner. Rose "gave up her physical form" to create Steven, leaving behind only her pink, pentagonal-faceted gem, now embedded in his navel. As a result, some Gems have considered Steven and Rose to be the same entity; a major character arc for Steven involves his wrestling with his mother's complex legacy, and whether he must take responsibility for her choices.

With this gem, Steven develops a wide variety of magical abilities. He is able to summon his mother's shield; create a spherical force field; heal Gems, humans, and objects with his saliva; create sentient plant life; shapeshift; float through the air; use empathetic telepathy and astral projection; combine bodies and minds with other Gems and/or humans to form powerful "fusions"; and revive the dead with his tears. By the movie, Steven has fully mastered his Gem abilities.

Cheerful, kind-hearted, carefree, and always willing to see the best in people, Steven is beloved by the Gems and well-liked by the people of Beach City, including his best friend Connie Maheswaran. Steven is said to take after Rose in terms of personality, as he is empathetic and all-loving, though Rebecca Sugar says that he actually inherited this attitude from Greg. Over the course of the series, Steven matures greatly, garnering new respect for his position as a protector of Earth and becoming more aware of the dangers of being a Crystal Gem. According to Sugar, Steven's greatest flaw is his self-sacrificing nature; he continually sets aside his own safety and emotional well-being in favor of others, which eventually takes a toll on his mental health.

Late in the series, Steven grows concerned about his role as the inheritor of his late mother's legacy, especially after he finds out that Rose Quartz herself was in actuality originally Pink Diamond, a member of the Great Diamond Authority that reigns supreme over the Gem race. The other Diamonds—Yellow, Blue, and White Diamond—assume Steven is Pink Diamond in an alternate form and attempt to hold him responsible for her actions and make him reclaim Pink Diamond's place among them. In the series finale, "Change Your Mind", White Diamond briefly removes his gem from his body; it regenerates itself into a form identical to that of Steven's physical body, thus finally reassuring him that he truly is his own individual, not merely a reincarnation of his mother.

In the epilogue series, Steven Universe Future, Steven struggles with feelings of purposelessness after the Gem empire is reformed and his friends and family no longer need his help, and his unresolved emotional trauma from the events of the original series leads him to overreact to minor stresses and life changes. Near the end of the series, this stress builds up to the point that he turns into a giant, kaiju-like monster, endangering Beach City, but the love and support of his friends and family help turn him back to normal. In the final episode of the series, Steven leaves Beach City indefinitely to seek out a new purpose and live like a normal human.

Steven usually wears a red T-shirt with a yellow star in the center, blue jeans, and salmon-pink flip-flops. In cold weather, he often wears a hooded sweatshirt or knitted sweater. In Steven Universe: The Movie, he retains his jeans and flip-flops but now wears a sky blue T-shirt, again bearing a yellow star and a pink varsity jacket with white trims. In Steven Universe Future, he retains his clothing from the film but now wears a black T-shirt instead of a blue one.

== Reception ==
Steven has been well-received by fans and critics alike. Susana Polo of Polygon praises Steven for being the "toxic masculinity antidote" in that his dominant traits of empathy and kindness are what make him such a vital member of the Crystal Gems. Polo also commends Steven's subversion of gender definitions, him being a young boy in a feminine role with defensive abilities that manifest in shades of pink. Similarly, in a post on Bitch Flicks, Ashley Gallagher also praises Steven's characterization outside of typical masculinity and his stereotypically defensive and feminine powers such as his shield and his healing while also expressing approval of his relationship with Connie.

Highly praising the evolution of the character through the series, Eric Thurm of Polygon stated after the season five finale: "Back in the show's first season, Steven was far more irritating. He was myopic, focusing on what was right in front of him to the detriment of more important priorities — especially when what was right in front of him was the prospect of getting ridiculously buff. He was a huge goofball incapable of taking anything seriously. And he had a child's instinct for deception when it seemed like he might be in trouble, whether that meant forming a 'Secret Team' to hide a mistake or asking the Gems to pretend to be his human mother. But the story of Steven Universe isn't about Steven discarding the things that made, and still make, him childish — it's about figuring out how to use them in more specific, salutary ways. The idea that there are childish qualities worth cultivating, alongside others that can and should be avoided or shed, is a refreshingly nuanced (and accurate) take on how to be a person, even if being that kind of person requires fusing with your own body, especially for kids. Being able to gain emotional maturity, insight, and wisdom while still retaining the best parts of being new to the world — that's the disposition Steven Universe asks of us as we, whether 14 or 34 or 34,000, continue to grow."
