= Deedee Magno Hall =

American actress (born 1975)

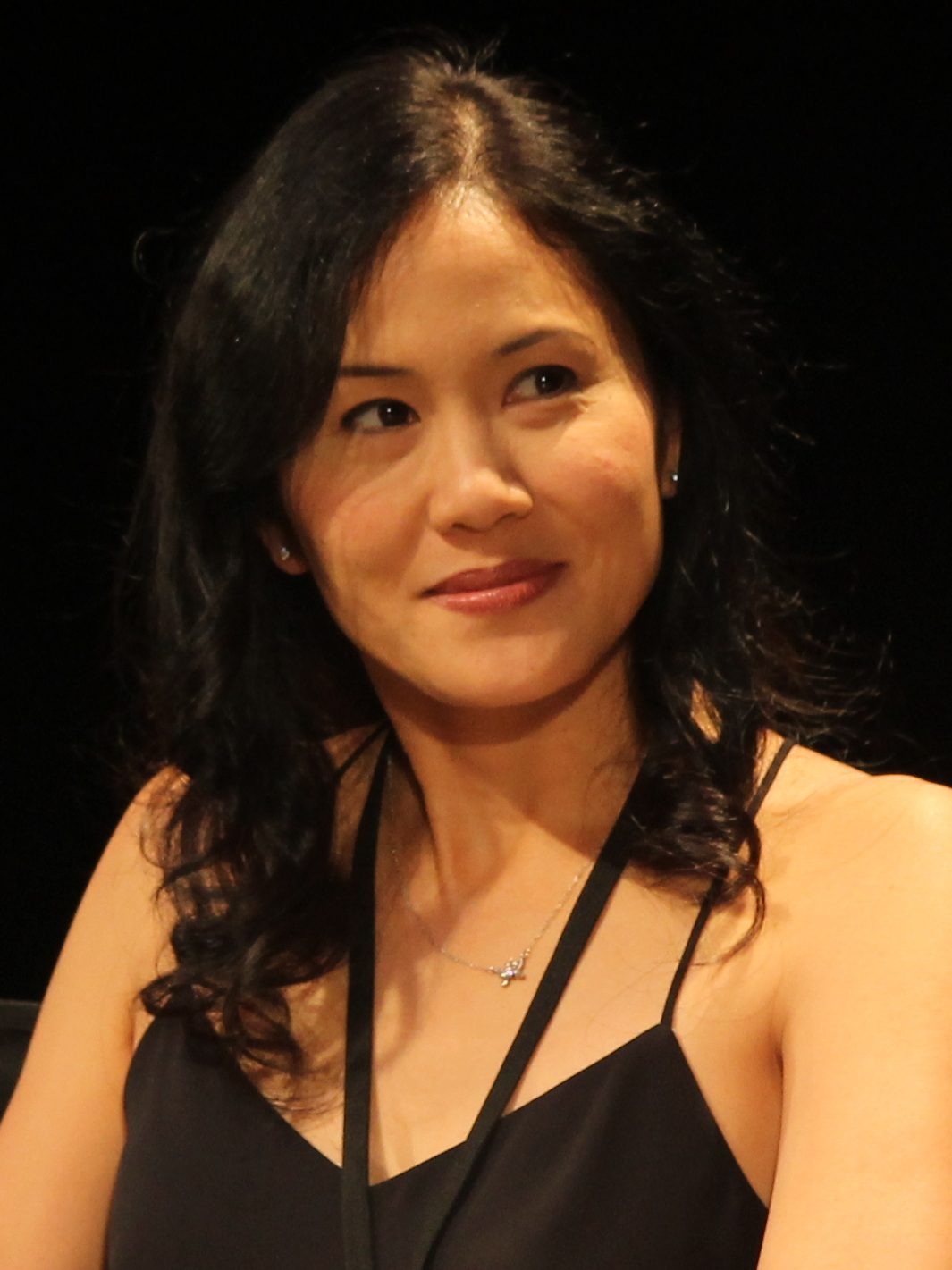
- Hall at Florida Supercon in 2016
- Born: Deedee Lynn Magno; April 2, 1975 (age 51); Portsmouth, Virginia, U.S.
- Occupations: Actress; singer
- Years active: 1988–present
- Spouse: Cliffton Hall (m. 2003)
- Children: 2
- Hall's speaking voice On voice acting auditions

Deedee Lynn Magno Hall (née Magno; born April 2, 1975) is an American actress and singer. She is best known for her work in the pop group The Party, and as the voice of Pearl in the Steven Universe franchise.

== Early life ==
Deedee Magno grew up in San Diego, California, and Orlando, Florida.

== Career ==
Magno Hall began acting at a young age on the Disney Channel series The All New Mickey Mouse Club (first recorded in 1989) from 1989-1991, and occasionally in 1992. She also appears as Jasmine on the Disney's Aladdin: A Musical Spectacular soundtrack. She is credited as one of the students in the 1993 film Sister Act 2: Back in the Habit and voiced Princess Dinner Guest in an episode of Happily Ever After: Fairy Tales for Every Child.

After The Party, Magno Hall went on to perform in musical theatre, most notable was her role of Kim in the Broadway production of Miss Saigon, a role she later reprised on the national tour. She later played the role of Nessarose on the first national tour of Wicked, from December 12, 2006, to November 16, 2008. She reprised the role in the San Francisco sit-down production at the Orpheum Theatre. Performances began January 27, 2009, with an opening night of February 6, 2009. She played her final performance on September 5, 2010, when the production closed. She joined the ensemble for the US tour of If/Then in October 2015, listed as "Cathy and others" and was the understudy for Elizabeth and Kate. Magno Hall starred in the East West Players production of Next to Normal as Diana Goodman from May 12 to June 18, 2017.

Magno Hall came to wider attention for voicing Pearl on the Cartoon Network program Steven Universe from 2013 to 2019, and the follow-up series Steven Universe Future from 2019 to 2020. She also voiced other Pearls and miscellaneous characters in both series. Magno Hall provided both the spoken and singing voice for Pearl in Steven Universe: The Movie, Spinel Finds Out About Pearl's Secret Rap Career, video games such as Steven Universe: Attack the Light, Steven Universe: Save the Light, Steven Universe: The Phantom Fable, and Steven Universe: Unleash the Light, and animated shorts. Magno Hall also voiced Snuggs in the animated series Doc McStuffins, from 2016 to 2017, and three characters (Dorris, Dominel, and Pyllis) in the video game Epic Seven.

In 2021, Magno Hall voiced multiple characters, specifically Emissary, Vina, and Newscaster, in Trese and two characters in Dogs in Space, Penelope and Elder Shrubdub. She also voiced the character of Rory in Craig of the Creek, two characters in We Baby Bears (Snowball and Fairy #2), Lola Belen in an episode of Firebuds, and Queenie Santos in the video game We Are OFK. Since 2023, Magno Hall has voiced Miss Deer Teacher in the Disney animated series Kiff.

== Personal life ==
Magno Hall is married to Cliffton Hall, who has starred opposite her in both Miss Saigon and Wicked national tours, and as Fiyero in the San Francisco production of Wicked. He also played the role of Dan Goodman alongside her in East West Player's production of Next to Normal. They played opposite each other as Donna Sheridan and Sam Carmichael in a Guam production of Mamma Mia!. They have two sons named Kaeden and Brycen.

== Filmography ==
=== Live-action ===
==== Film ====
Year	Title	Role	Notes	Source
1993	Sister Act 2: Back in the Habit	Classroom Kid		
2002	Face	Kelly		
2013	Riff Rockit	Hanna Hat (voice)	Direct-to-video	
TBA	And One	Melissa Alvarez		

==== Television ====
Year	Title	Role	Notes	Source
1989–1991	The All New Mickey Mouse Club	Herself		
1993	Blossom	Herself		
1998	Dellaventura	Lin Chang	Episode: "Made in America"	
1998	Rear Window	Popoff Nurse	TV movie	
2000	Third Watch	Lori Tan	Episode: "Alone in a Crowd"	
2017	Curb Your Enthusiasm	Wife #3	Episode: "Fatwa!"	
2018	Ching Chong Blue	Dana	Episode: "Rickshaw to Hollywood"	
2019	Goliath	Ms. Kwok	Episode: "Fer-De-Lance"	
2020	Grey's Anatomy	Katrina Scott	Episode: "Put on a Happy Face"	
2021	9-1-1	Surgeon	Episode: "Suspicion"	

=== Voice roles ===
==== Film ====
Year	Title	Role	Notes	Source
2019	Steven Universe: The Movie	Pearl, Blue Pearl, Yellow Pearl (voice)	Television film	

==== Television ====
Year	Title	Role	Notes	Source
1995	Happily Ever After: Fairy Tales for Every Child	Princess Dinner Guest (voice)	Episode: "The Princess and the Pea"	
2013–2019	Steven Universe	Pearl, Yellow Pearl, Blue Pearl, Pink Pearl, Holo-Pearl, Hopper, additional voices	Main cast	
2016–2017	Doc McStuffins	Snuggs (voice)	5 episodes	
2018–2019	Steven Universe and the Dove Self-Esteem Project	Pearl (voice)		
2019–2020	Steven Universe Future	Pearl, Holo-Pearl, Shell, Pink Pearl, Mega Pearl, Aubergine Pearl, Brandish (voice)	Main role	
2020	The Crystal Gems Say Be Anti-Racist	Pearl (voice)	2 episodes	
2021	Trese	Emissary, Vina, Newscaster (voice)	2 episodes	
2021–2022	Dogs in Space	Penelope, Elder Shrubdub (voice)	5 episodes	
2022	Craig of the Creek	Rory (voice)	2 episodes	
2022	We Baby Bears	Snowball, Fairy (voice)	2 episodes	
2022	Firebuds	Lola Belen (voice)	1 episode	
2023–present	Kiff	Miss Deer Teacher (voice)		

==== Video games ====
Year	Title	Role	Source
2014	Cartoon Network Superstar Soccer: Goal	Pearl	
2015	Steven Universe: Attack the Light	Pearl	
2017	Steven Universe: Save the Light	Pearl	
2018	Fallout 76	Gloria Chance	Steel Dawn DLC
2018	Epic Seven	Dominiel, Pyllis, Doris	
2019	Steven Universe: The Phantom Fable	Pearl, Lonely Pearl	
2019	Steven Universe: Unleash the Light	Pearl	
2022	We Are OFK	Queenie Santos	

=== Theatre ===
Year	Title	Role	Source
1995–2000	Miss Saigon Broadway, 2nd US National Tour	Kim	
2003–2016	Disney's Aladdin: A Musical Spectacular	Princess Jasmine	
2006–2008	Wicked Emerald City Tour	Nessarose	
2009–2010	Wicked San Francisco Production	Nessarose	
2017	Next to Normal	Diana Goodman	
2019	Mamma Mia!	Donna Sheridan	

== Awards and nominations ==
Year	Title	Category	Role	Result
2014	BTVA Voice Acting Award	Best Female Lead Vocal Performance in a Television Series - Comedy/Musical	Pearl (Steven Universe)	Nominated
2015	BTVA Voice Acting Award	Best Vocal Ensemble in a Television Series - Comedy/Musical; Shared with Zach Callison, Michaela Dietz, Estelle, Grace Rolek, Tom Scharpling, Jennifer Paz, Susan Egan, Matthew Moy and Kate Micucci	Steven Universe	Won
2015	BTVA Voice Acting Award	Best Female Lead Vocal Performance in a Television Series - Comedy/Musical	Pearl (Steven Universe)	Won
2015	BTVA Voice Acting Award	Best Female Lead Vocal Performance in a Television Series - Comedy/Musical (People's Choice)	Pearl (Steven Universe)	Won
2016	BTVA Voice Acting Award	Best Vocal Cast in a Television Series; Shared with Zach Callison, Michaela Dietz, Estelle, Kate Micucci, Matthew Moy, Shelby Rabara, Mary Elizabeth McGlynn, Charlyne Yi and Erica Luttrell	Steven Universe	Nominated
2016	BTVA Voice Acting Award	Best Vocal Cast in a Television Series (People's Choice); Shared with Zach Callison, Michaela Dietz, Estelle, Kate Micucci, Matthew Moy, Shelby Rabara, Mary Elizabeth McGlynn, Charlyne Yi and Erica Luttrell	Steven Universe	Won
2017	BTVA Voice Acting Award	Best Vocal Cast in a Television Series; Shared with Zach Callison, Michaela Dietz, Estelle, Shelby Rabara, Tom Scharpling, Jennifer Paz, Grace Rolek, Kimberly Brooks, Charlyne Yi, Reagan Gomez-Preston, Kate Micucci, AJ Michalka, Colton Dunn, and Matthew Moy	Steven Universe	Nominated
