= List of Steven Universe characters =

American cartoon characters

Characters of Steven Universe Future: Steven Universe (center, below), Connie Maheswaran (to Steven's right), and Lars Barriga (behind Connie), along with several of the major gems in the series.

Steven Universe is an American animated television series created by Rebecca Sugar and produced by Cartoon Network Studios. The series focuses on the adventures of the Crystal Gems—magical alien warriors who protect the Earth from their own kind—and the humans they interact with in the fictional town of Beach City.

The series has received critical acclaim for the diversity and deep characterization of its characters; its portrayal of relationships, including queer relationships; and subversion of stereotypical gender norms, along with its art style, voice acting, music, and storytelling.

== Main characters ==
=== Steven Universe ===
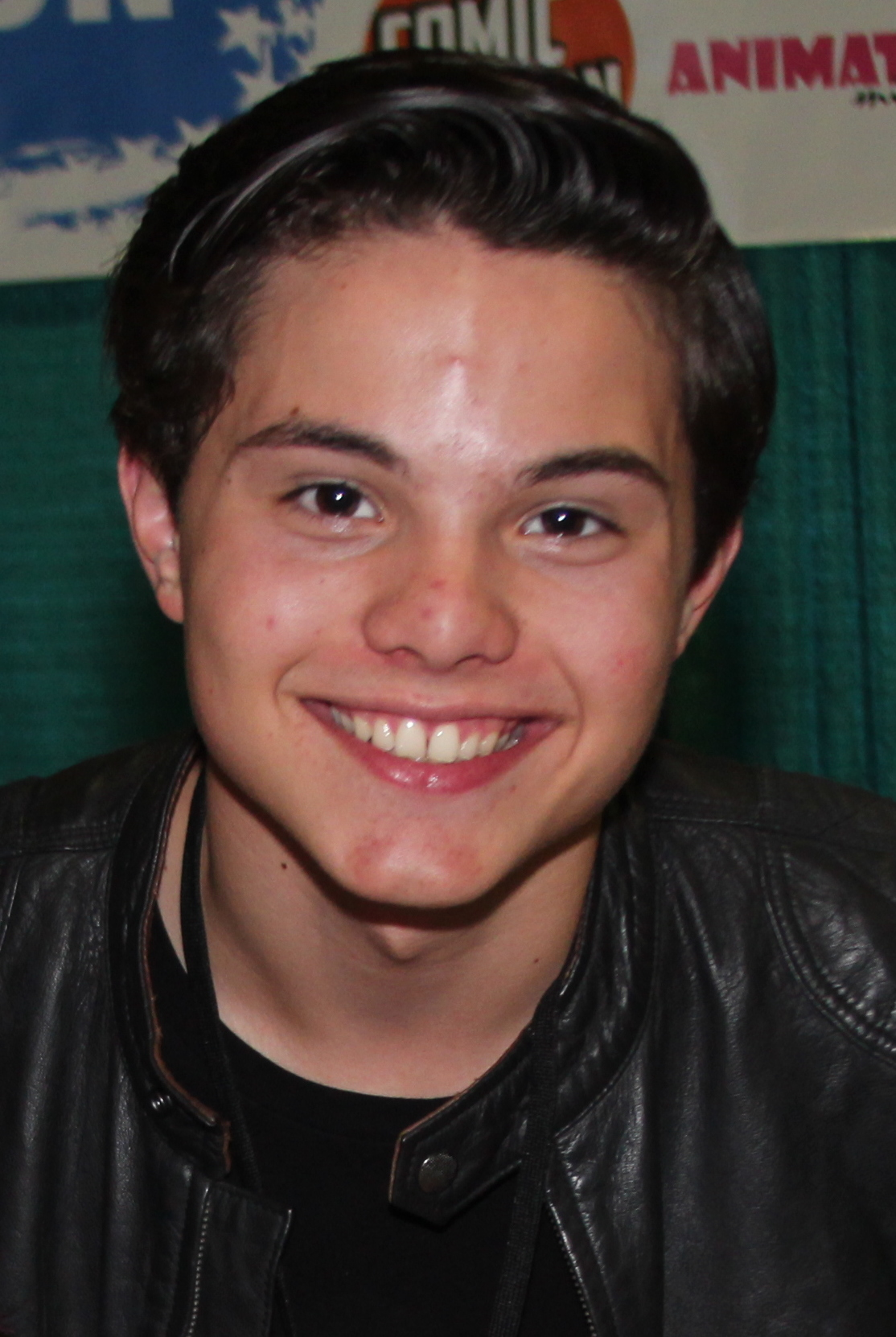
Steven Universe is voiced by Zach Callison.

The titular protagonist of the series, Steven Universe (voiced by Zach Callison) is the youngest and only male member of the Crystal Gems. His characterization is loosely inspired by series creator Rebecca Sugar's younger brother Steven Sugar, a background artist for the show. His portrayal as a male character whose heroism is based on traditionally feminine attributes such as empathy and nurturing, and who seeks to live up to the legacy of his heroic mother, has drawn favorable reaction from critics.

In the show, Steven is the son of Greg Universe, a human musician, and Rose Quartz, the former leader of the Crystal Gems. Rose is described as having "given up her physical form to bring [Steven] into the world" as the first Gem-human hybrid, and her gemstone is embedded in his navel. At the beginning of the show's narrative, he is in his early teens but appears younger due to the interaction of his Gem magic with his aging process. Steven is caring, protective, brave, gentle, forgiving, and eager to help the people he loves with their problems; his optimism is often a source of strength for the other Crystal Gems. His gemstone gives him a wide range of magical abilities; one of the long-term story arcs of the series is his progress in learning about and mastering these abilities, beginning in the first episode with his first successful attempt to summon his Gem weapon, a pink shield. Other long-lasting character arcs involving Steven include his anxiety about filling his mother's place in the Crystal Gems and coping with her complex legacy and his developing friendship with his human best friend Connie.

The sequel series, Steven Universe Future, focuses on Steven's psychological state in the aftermath of the events of the main series. In Future, Steven wrestles with feelings of purposelessness now that the battles he spent his early adolescence fighting are resolved, and copes with the lasting psychological trauma from the stress he experienced while fighting them.

=== Garnet ===
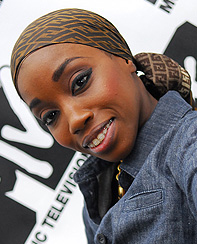
Garnet is voiced by Estelle.

The disciplined current leader of the Crystal Gems, Garnet (voiced by Estelle) is quiet, stoic, pragmatic, and described by Steven as "mysterious", but over the course of the series she becomes more emotionally open, especially in expressing her love for Steven. According to the writers, her great self-confidence is reflected in the fact that she never asks questions. She possesses two gems in the palms of her hands, from which she summons her Gem weapon, a pair of heavy gauntlets. She also has a precognitive ability she refers to as "future vision". Garnet has three eyes, over which she wears a visor.

In the first-season finale "Jail Break", it is revealed that Garnet is a fusion of two smaller Gems named Ruby and Sapphire. Garnet's existence is thus a personification of Ruby and Sapphire's loving relationship—she describes herself as "a conversation" and "made of love"—and her personality is a stable blending of Ruby and Sapphire's traits. The character of Garnet has won acclaim from critics as a representation of a queer relationship. Though she is normally stoic, Garnet's strongest emotional displays are often centered around fusion: anger and revulsion at what she perceives as abuses or perversions of fusion, and delight when Steven develops the ability to fuse. The second-season episode "The Answer", a flashback showing how Ruby and Sapphire met and formed Garnet for the first time, was nominated for an Emmy Award and adapted into a children's book.

==== Ruby and Sapphire ====
Ruby (voiced by Lo Mutuc (Note: Credited as Charlyne Yi)) and Sapphire (voiced by Erica Luttrell)—the two smaller Gems who are the components of Garnet—first appeared in "Jail Break". They have contrasting personalities and abilities: Sapphire is an emotionally reserved Gem who held a high rank on Homeworld, with ice-related powers and the ability to see into the future; while Ruby is impulsive and hotheaded, has fire-related abilities, and was a common foot soldier on Homeworld. Garnet's qualities are the result of a "conversation" between these two contrasting personalities. Near the end of the fifth season, after a period of questioning the basis of their relationship in the wake of revelations about Rose Quartz's past, Ruby and Sapphire recommit themselves to each other through marriage; critics described the characters' marriage as a milestone of progress in the history of queer representation in children's television.

=== Amethyst ===
Amethyst (voiced by Michaela Dietz) is the shortest and youngest of the Crystal Gems other than Steven. Her mischievous sense of humor often provides comic relief, and her fun-loving, childish nature bolsters her friendship with Steven. Her amethyst gemstone, from which she can summon a whip, is located on her chest; she also makes frequent use of shapeshifting capabilities. She was the last of the Gems created on Earth as part of the Gem Homeworld's "Kindergarten" project to convert Earth into a Gem-occupied world and learns in the second season that she is smaller and weaker than other Gems of her type (the "Quartz" warrior caste). Her rebellious and hedonistic personality covers for deep-seated feelings of inadequacy, resentment, and fear that the other Crystal Gems do not respect her, and a long-term character arc involves her learning to respect herself and her capabilities.

=== Pearl ===
Resembling a ballerina in her slender build, costume, and graceful style of movement, Pearl (voiced by Deedee Magno Hall) is a temperamental, precise strategist and technician. Her gemstone is a white pearl in her forehead from which she can summon a spear and create holographic images, and store other items. She is the most motherly and protective of Steven out of the Gems. Pearl harbored a deep romantic devotion to Rose Quartz, leading to lasting grief over Rose's absence and jealousy over her relationship with Greg; major character arcs for Pearl include learning how to cope with and move beyond these emotions. On the Gem Homeworld, pearls are "made-to-order" servants for high-ranking Gems, and the fifth season reveals that Pearl originally served Rose Quartz in Rose's original identity of Pink Diamond. Pearl has learned to move beyond her caste role as a fighter and technician, but still has difficulty learning to feel independent rather than subordinate. Critical response to Pearl has largely appreciated her portrayal as a complex and sympathetic, yet flawed queer character.

== Major supporting characters ==
=== Greg Universe ===
Steven's father Greg (voiced by Tom Scharpling) is a former rock musician who now lives in his van and runs a car wash in Beach City. Although Steven lives with the Gems, Greg remains a constant presence in his life. Though he is often made uncomfortable by Gem magic, Greg is laid-back, accepting, and supportive of Steven's adventures; it is largely from Greg that Steven inherits his optimistic, empathetic temperament. As a young adult, Greg ran away from his controlling parents to become a traveling musician; the freedom and lack of structure he gave young Steven was a reaction against his own strict upbringing.

=== Connie Maheswaran ===
Connie Maheswaran (/məˈheɪʃwɔːrən/ mə-HAYSH-wor-ən; voiced by Grace Rolek) is Steven's best friend. Introduced as an intelligent yet lonely person in the episode "Bubble Buddies" early in the first season, she rapidly develops a close relationship with Steven. An avid reader of fantasy literature, she admires what she calls Steven's "magical destiny" and is eager to be part of it. Her involvement in Gem adventures gradually increases over the course of the series; she inherits Rose Quartz's sword and is eventually accepted as a member of the Crystal Gems. Long-term character arcs involving Connie include her learning to see herself as Steven's equal despite not having magical abilities of her own and to push back against her own overprotective parents. Some viewers have interpreted Steven and Connie's relationship as romantic or potentially romantic. In Steven Universe Future, Steven proposes marriage to Connie; she turns him down because they are still teenagers, but this does not end their relationship, and they share a kiss in the final episode.

Connie is Indian American.

=== Lars and Sadie ===
At the beginning of the series, Lars Barriga (voiced by Matthew Moy) and Sadie Miller (voiced by Kate Micucci) are teenage employees at the Big Donut, a donut shop that Steven frequently visits. Lars is inconsiderate, irresponsible, and abrasive, but insecure and desperate to be accepted by those he considers to be the "cool kids". Sadie is friendly and shy, but has difficulty asserting herself and tends to try and fix Lars' issues for him without his consent. Despite Lars's negative attitude, Steven considers Lars to be a close friend, and Sadie has a crush on him. Lars and Sadie's intermittently affectionate and antagonistic relationship is a recurring focus of episodes in which both characters feature. Matthew Moy has stated that Lars is one of his favorite acting roles, and has described his character as a "complicated fellow". According to Rebecca Sugar, Lars and Sadie are based upon characters she created while in college. They appeared in both the pilot episode of Steven Universe and the first episode of the series proper; they are the only characters other than the Crystal Gems to have speaking roles in those episodes.

Lars is prominently featured at the end of season 4 and beginning of season 5, during which he is abducted and taken to the Gem Homeworld with Steven; his character arc in these episodes focuses on him learning to overcome his fear of embarrassing himself and being perceived as inadequate. This storyline culminates when he is killed defending Steven and others from Homeworld security robots and then revived by Steven's healing powers. When revived, Lars's body has turned pink, and he manifests magical properties, including the ability for Steven to teleport to a pocket dimension via his hair. With his newfound confidence, Lars becomes the leader of a band of fugitive Gems and captain of a stolen spaceship. At the same time, Sadie, left behind on Earth, develops the self-confidence to quit her job at the Big Donut and form a horror rock band with the "cool kids", "Sadie Killer and the Suspects". The story arc of Lars and Sadie's relationship concludes with their final appearance in Steven Universe Future, which depicts the characters acknowledging that they have grown apart and moved on from each other amicably.

=== Rose Quartz (Pink Diamond) ===
The original leader of the Crystal Gems, Rose Quartz (voiced by Susan Egan) is Steven's mother, who "gave up her physical form" to allow Steven to be born. Her gem is located in her abdomen. Although she appears only in flashbacks, her legacy and her absence define the lives and relationships of the other main characters. She led the ancient rebellion against the Gem Homeworld, and the Crystal Gems describe her to Steven as loving and seeing beauty in all forms of life. Flashback episodes show the development of her relationship with Greg from infatuation into love and understanding, and eventually her earlier history as well. Steven initially feels great pressure to live up to her example as a compassionate leader, but his relationship with her memory becomes complicated at the end of the third season when he learns of morally questionable actions that she undertook during the war. "Lion 3: Straight to Video", the first episode in which she appeared (via a videotaped message to Steven), was nominated for an Emmy Award for short-form animation.

In the fifth-season episode "A Single Pale Rose", Rose Quartz is revealed to have originally been Pink Diamond, the Gem leader overseeing the Gem colonization of the planet Earth. Originally immature and believing herself undervalued by the other Diamonds, she was made miserable by the strict expectations placed on her by her status as a Diamond. She created the alternate identity of Rose Quartz to alleviate her boredom while running the colonization of Earth and ended up falling in love with the diversity of the planet's life and the possibilities that came with it. Unable to protect the life on Earth any other way, she used her new alternate identity to lead the rebellion to protect the planet, and eventually faked her own assassination to break free from her former life.

=== Lion ===
Lion (animal noises by Dee Bradley Baker) is Steven's mysterious pink pet lion who possesses a variety of magical abilities. Lion provides Steven with connections to Rose Quartz's legacy—he brings Steven and Connie to Rose's secret armory, and a number of Rose's keepsakes are stored in a pocket dimension accessible via his mane, including her sword and a videotaped message to Steven. He is introduced in the episode "Steven's Lion" early in the first season, in which he appears mysteriously in the desert and follows Steven home. In season 5, it is implied that Lion was originally an ordinary lion, and, like Lars, developed his magical nature after dying and then being resurrected by Rose Quartz. In the same season, after Lars's resurrection, Lars's hair becomes another portal to the pocket dimension.

=== Lapis Lazuli ===
Lapis Lazuli (voiced by Jennifer Paz) is a Gem who was trapped in a magical mirror on Earth for thousands of years. When the mirror is given to Steven in the first-season episode “Mirror Gem”, she befriends him, but initially mistrusts the other Crystal Gems and attacks them when Steven frees her. As the first sentient Gem other than the Crystal Gems to appear in the series, Lapis's appearance sets the stage for deeper plot developments; the show's writers cite it as "really the beginning of the show". In "Jail Break", the first-season finale, she prevents the Homeworld Gem Jasper from attacking the Crystal Gems by fusing with her and imprisoning themselves at the bottom of the ocean. After being freed in the third-season premiere, she forms a close relationship with Peridot and comes to accept living on Earth. Her character arc in her intermittent appearances thereafter involves her slow recovery from the psychological trauma of having been imprisoned and being part of an abusive fusion, and coping with the fear of being victimized again. Late in the fifth season, she joins the Crystal Gems to fight Blue Diamond. She has powerful telekinetic control over water and can produce wings made of water from the lapis lazuli gemstone on her back.

=== Peridot ===
At her introduction late in the first season, Peridot (voiced by Shelby Rabara) is a technician dispatched by the Gem Homeworld to check on remaining Gem installations on Earth; her appearance becomes an ominous sign that the Crystal Gems are under threat from Homeworld. Stranded on Earth after the events of the first-season finale, Peridot becomes a recurring antagonist in the first half of the second season before being eventually captured and convinced to ally with the Crystal Gems to defuse the Cluster. When the Crystal Gems first encounter her she wears technological "limb enhancers", which give her a robotic appearance; after she is captured, she loses them and appears much shorter and weaker without them. She plays a prominent role in the last part of the second season, during which her character arc centers around her learning to outgrow Homeworld's hierarchical, utilitarian mindset and to appreciate the value of friendship, individuality, and life on Earth. She eventually declares herself a member of the Crystal Gems and forms a close relationship with Lapis Lazuli. She is stubborn and self-aggrandizing in demeanor but demonstrates a willingness to learn from her mistakes and to treat others with greater respect and kindness. Her gemstone is a triangular peridot on her forehead, and she discovers in the third season that she can telekinetically control metal objects. Rabara is credited as a series regular in Future.

=== Jasper ===
Introduced at the end of the first season, Jasper (voiced by Kimberly Brooks) is a powerful Quartz warrior serving Homeworld and a renowned veteran of their ancient war against the Crystal Gems. Her gemstone is a yellow jasper in the place of her nose, and her Gem weapon is a heavy helmet. A subordinate of Pink Diamond created on Earth, she bears a long-standing grudge against the planet and Rose Quartz for Pink's purported destruction. She is openly contemptuous of those she perceives as weak or defective and is "determined to never be weak or vulnerable" herself. Jasper serves as the principal antagonist in the second half of the third season; as a perfectly formed Quartz warrior, she becomes the target of Amethyst's resentment and desire to prove herself. She ends up fusing with a corrupted Gem monster in an attempt to defeat the Crystal Gems, becomes corrupted herself, and is neutralized and captured, until the corrupted Gems are healed in the series finale. Steven Universe Future reveals a defeated and resentful Jasper living in self-imposed exile in the woods; she is shattered in a rematch with Steven, and swears loyalty to him after he manages to repair her gemstone; at the end of the series, she's seen living in Little Homeworld.

=== Bismuth ===
The Crystal Gems' weaponsmith during the ancient rebellion, Bismuth (voiced first by Uzo Aduba and later by Miriam Hyman) is passionately devoted to overthrowing the hierarchical structure of Gem society and grateful to Rose Quartz for showing her that an alternative existed. However, her radicalism led to a dispute with Rose over the use of a weapon designed to permanently destroy enemy Gems, leading Rose to bubble her gem and hide her fate from the other Crystal Gems. In the show's special hundredth episode, Steven accidentally frees Bismuth and befriends her, but is later forced to bubble her again when the same conflict repeats itself. Steven later frees Bismuth again in the fifth season so she can attend Ruby and Sapphire's wedding; upon her release, she comes to understand Rose's choices after learning of her true identity as Pink Diamond.

Aduba's guest performance in Bismuth's debut episode, and Bismuth's portrayal as a sympathetic character whose complex disagreement with Steven had no easy answers, won praise from critics, although some commentators objected to the possible stereotypical implications of an African-American woman playing a character with a dangerously militant ideology. Aduba continued to voice the character in the majority of her appearances, but was replaced by Miriam Hyman in the video game Unleash the Light and the final three episodes of Steven Universe Future due to scheduling conflicts for Aduba.

=== The Great Diamond Authority ===
The Great Diamond Authority are the leaders of the Gem Empire, whom all other Gems are created to serve without question, and the primary antagonists in the fourth and fifth seasons. The first two Diamonds introduced in the series are the vindictive, impatient, and disdainful Yellow Diamond (voiced by Patti LuPone) and the depressive and sentimental Blue Diamond (voiced by Lisa Hannigan). Yellow and Blue, despite their different approaches, are both motivated to destroy Earth by their mutual grief and guilt over Pink Diamond's death, before finally learning late in the fifth season that her demise was faked. Yellow and Blue themselves are intimidated by their superior White Diamond (voiced by Christine Ebersole), a passive-aggressive, condescending, and narcissistic perfectionist who sees all other Gems as flawed reflections of herself and possesses the ability to turn other Gems into colorless puppet thralls she can act through. It is her vision of complete perfection attained through strictly-enforced standards that shaped the Gem empire into its current state, at the cost of making her subjects miserable, including Pink. The Diamonds' relationships are portrayed as those of an abusive and controlling family, and it was this dynamic that would drive Pink away to become Rose Quartz and rebel against and eventually abandon them. In the fifth-season finale, the Diamonds are eventually persuaded by Steven to attempt to fix their mistakes rather than ignore them or project them onto others.

=== Spinel ===
The main antagonist of Steven Universe: The Movie, Spinel (voiced by Sarah Stiles) was created to be Pink Diamond's playmate on Homeworld, but was left behind when Pink took charge of the Gem colonization of Earth. Spinel is furious that Pink abandoned her, made new friends and ended her life without ever returning for her; in revenge, she tries to kill Steven and destroy life on Earth. Steven manages to convince her to let go of her revenge and live with the Diamonds. She reappears in Steven Universe Future still living with the Diamonds. Her character design was influenced by the rubber-hose style of animation, which Rebecca Sugar describes as symbolizing that she is "frozen in time" and "didn't get [a] chance to develop." Her pink heart-shaped gemstone is located on her chest; it was originally right-side-up, but turned upside-down as a result of her emotional devastation at Pink Diamond abandoning her.

== Other recurring characters ==
=== Humans ===
Steven Universe possesses a large cast of occasionally-appearing human characters, many of whom become the focus of episodes that explore their relationships with the main characters and each other. According to critic Sara Goodwin, one of the great strengths of Steven Universe is the depth of development it gives to its "normal human being" characters and how the superpowered characters are affected by them.

Recurring human characters include:

- Buck Dewey (Lamar Abrams), Jenny Pizza (Reagan Gomez-Preston), and Sour Cream (Brian Posehn): the "Cool Kids", three older teenagers who become friendly with Steven, and whose friendship Lars seeks. They form the band "Sadie Killer and the Suspects" with Sadie in Season 5, but go their separate ways to pursue their individual interests in Steven Universe Future.
- Onion (Zach Callison): The son of Yellowtail and Vidalia. Sour Cream's younger maternal half-brother, whose odd and destructive unsupervised behavior other characters often find disturbing. Onion does not speak, but Zach Callison voices his occasional mumbling noises.
- Ronaldo Fryman (Zach Steel): A conspiracy theorist blogger who occasionally attempts to investigate the paranormal events caused by the Gems. His blog, "Keep Beach City Weird", was maintained in-character on Tumblr by Steven Universe writers.
- Peedee Fryman (Atticus Shaffer): Ronaldo's cynical and world-weary younger brother.
- Mr. Fryman (Billy Merritt): Ronaldo and Peedee's father, and the proprietor of the French-fry stand "Beach Citywalk Fries."
- Kiki Pizza (Reagan Gomez-Preston): Jenny's hard-working twin sister. She is Nanefua's granddaughter and Kofi's daughter.
- Kofi Pizza (Godfrey): Jenny and Kiki's temperamental father, who owns the family's pizza parlor, "Fish Stew Pizza."
- Nanefua Pizza (Toks Olagundoye): Kofi's mother. Steven Universe animator/director Ian Jones-Quartey based Nanefua on his grandmother, noted Ghanaian stateswoman Theodosia Okoh. In the fifth season, Nanefua is elected mayor of Beach City.
- Bill Dewey (Joel Hodgson): Buck's father, the approval-seeking mayor of Beach City. In the fifth season, after Nanefua Pizza becomes the new mayor of Beach City, he gets a job at the Big Donut.
- Priyanka Maheswaran (Mary Elizabeth McGlynn) and Doug Maheswaran (Crispin Freeman): Connie's strict and overprotective parents. Priyanka is a physician, and Doug is a private security guard.
- Harold Smiley (Sinbad in season 1, later Colton Dunn): the overworked manager of the Beach City Funland amusement park and video arcade.
- Vidalia (Jackie Buscarino) and Yellowtail (Tom Scharpling): Onion's parents. Vidalia, an artist, is also Sour Cream's mother, and an old friend of Amethyst and Greg; her husband Yellowtail is a fisherman. Like Onion, Yellowtail does not speak intelligibly; Tom Scharpling voices his occasional mumbling noises.
- Marty (Jon Wurster): Greg's greedy and manipulative former manager, and Sour Cream's estranged father.
- Jamie (Eugene Cordero): A postman and aspiring actor. He enjoys Shakespearean poetry and has a dramatic flair.
- Barb Miller (Kate Flannery): Sadie's energetic and strong-willed mother, who works as a postal carrier.
- Kevin (Andrew Kishino): An arrogant teenager who makes unwelcome advances on Stevonnie.
- Andy DeMayo (Dave Willis): Greg's cousin, a biplane pilot who is initially uncomfortable with Greg and Steven's unconventional lifestyle and regretful of how his family has grown apart. His late parents owned the barn where Lapis and Peridot take up residence.
- Dante Barriga (Matthew Moy) and Martha Barriga (Nancy Linari): Lars's parents.

=== Ruby squad ===
Rubies (all voiced by Lo Mutac (Note: Credited as Charlyne Yi)) are a variety of Gem who act as foot soldiers and bodyguards on Homeworld. Aside from the Crystal Gems' Ruby, a squad of five gullible but ruthless Rubies, sent by Yellow Diamond to retrieve Jasper, appear as recurring characters beginning in the third season. Steven nicknames the quintet according to the location of their gems: the rookie Leggy, the cheerful Navy, the violent Army, the veteran Eyeball, and the leader Doc. In the sequel series Steven Universe Future, one of the rubies, Eyeball, partners with Aquamarine to get revenge on Steven. Yi's performance of their diverse personalities has drawn praise from critics.

=== Pearls ===
Pearls (all voiced by Deedee Magno Hall) are a type of Gem who act as servants to high-ranking Gems on Homeworld. Aside from the Crystal Gems' Pearl, Pearls belonging to the other Diamonds have appeared. The docile and artistic blue Pearl and the prideful yellow Pearl serve as attendants to Blue and Yellow Diamond. Another Pearl, later nicknamed "Volleyball", preceded Pearl as Pink Diamond's servant before spending millennia under White Diamond's control. She has a scar over her left eye, caused by trauma from accidentally being hit by the force of Pink Diamond's power.

=== The Off-Colors ===
A group of fugitive Gems from Homeworld, first appearing in season 5, who lived in hiding underground because they are regarded as defective or do not conform to Homeworld's expectations. They are the Rutile Twins (voiced by Ashly Burch), a Gem with two conjoined bodies from the waist up; Fluorite (voiced by Kathy Fisher), a huge caterpillar-like fusion of six Gems; Padparadscha (voiced by Erica Luttrell), a Sapphire whose defective "future vision" can only predict the recent past; and Rhodonite (voiced by Enuka Okuma), an anxious "star-crossed" fusion of a Ruby and a Pearl. Under Lars's leadership, they steal a spaceship and flee Homeworld.

=== Nephrite ===
Nephrite (voiced by Aparna Nancherla) was an officer of the Homeworld army who was left behind on Earth when the Homeworld Gems abandoned the planet and became corrupted by the Diamonds' attack. She appears in her corrupted form as Centipeetle (vocal effects by Dee Bradley Baker), an acid-spitting, centipede-like monster that the Crystal Gems fight and capture in a bubble in the series premiere "Gem Glow". In the first-season episode "Monster Buddies", Steven frees her from her bubble, causing her to assume a diminutive form, and befriends her. In the third-season episode "Monster Reunion", he partially and temporarily heals her corruption and learns her history. At the end of the fifth season, she and other corrupted Gems are successfully healed with the help of the Diamonds.

=== Holly Blue Agate ===
Holly (voiced by Christine Pedi) is the supervisor of Pink Diamond's human zoo; she is abusive and dismissive to her Quartz subordinates. In the epilogue series Steven Universe Future, the loss of her status and power has left her flustered and confused.

=== Aquamarine ===
Aquamarine (voiced by Della Saba) is a Gem sent by Homeworld to capture humans from Earth at the end of the fourth season; she ends up apprehending Steven. Her childlike, innocent appearance contrasts with her ruthless and sadistic personality; Steven describes her as "awful, small, and mean". In Steven Universe Future, Aquamarine partners with Eyeball Ruby to get revenge on Steven for indirectly ruining their careers. The duo's mutual hatred for Steven allows them to fuse into Bluebird Azurite (voiced by Larissa Gallagher).

=== Topaz ===
Topaz (voiced by Martha Higareda) is a fusion of two Topazes, acting as Aquamarine's enforcer, who imprisons captured humans by fusing around them. Although silent and menacing in her first appearance, she soon reveals a sentimental and sympathetic side.

=== The Cluster ===
The Cluster is an artificial fusion embedded within the Earth after Homeworld's war against the Crystal Gems to destroy the planet. It is formed of millions of broken Gem shards, their minds shattered and desperate to feel whole. In the episode "Gem Drill", Steven helps its numerous components to find connections among themselves and eventually bubble itself to keep it from destroying Earth. In the episode "Reunited", when it is reawakened by the Diamonds, it temporarily comes to the surface, takes the form of a giant arm, and fights Yellow Diamond's ship, revealing that it is in control of itself and now intends to protect the Earth.

=== Fusions ===
Fusion is a process whereby two or more Gems combine their physical forms and minds to create a larger, more powerful individual who possesses all of the powers of their component Gems and more. Fusions are often able to combine their components' Gem weapons into a more powerful weapon. A strong bond between Gems is the primary driving force enabling them to form and maintain fusions. While the Gem Homeworld allows Gems of the same caste to fuse, usually for combat purposes, mixed-Gem fusions are considered offensive, and those that exist usually keep themselves from public knowledge. Same-Gem fusions form a larger version of their components' identical forms, but mixed-Gem fusions usually have extra body parts; for example, Garnet has three eyes and Opal has four arms. The concept of fusion is used by the show's writers for thematic purposes as a broad metaphor for a variety of types of intimacy and relationships.

Garnet is listed above as a main character; other fusions involving major characters are listed here in order of appearance.

- Opal (voiced by Aimee Mann): The fusion of Amethyst and Pearl, who first appears in the first-season episode "Giant Woman" as Steven's introduction to the concept of Gem fusion. Amethyst and Pearl rarely fuse, as their conflicting personalities make it difficult for them to achieve the necessary harmony to fuse. Opal can combine Pearl's spear and Amethyst's whip into a bow.
- Sugilite (voiced by Nicki Minaj): The fusion of Garnet and Amethyst, introduced and featured prominently in the first-season episode "Coach Steven". In that episode, Sugilite's behavior is dangerously violent, as Amethyst and Garnet's personalities when fused together become more unrestrained and aggressive, making her unwilling to separate. She can combine Garnet's gauntlets and Amethyst's whip into a giant flail.
- Alexandrite (voiced by Rita Rani Ahuja): The fusion of Garnet, Amethyst, and Pearl, introduced in the first-season episode "Fusion Cuisine". She is formidable in battle due to her massive size, six arms, and flame breath, but confused and unstable when she attempts to socialize with Connie's parents. She appears in the mobile video game Steven Universe: Attack the Light! as a powerful combined-attack move.
- Stevonnie (voiced by AJ Michalka): The fusion of Steven and Connie, and the first known instance of a human successfully participating in Gem fusion. Introduced in the first-season episode "Alone Together", Stevonnie has the appearance of an androgynous teenager of non-binary gender. The character has received critical acclaim both as a rare example of a non-binary character and as a metaphor by which the writers explore themes of puberty, maturation, consent, and healthy communication.
- Malachite (voiced by Kimberly Brooks and Jennifer Paz): The fusion of Jasper and Lapis Lazuli. In the first-season finale, Jasper fuses with Lapis to defeat the Crystal Gems, only for Lapis to take control of the fusion and imprison themselves at the bottom of the ocean. Though unstable, Malachite remains fused until eventually defeated by Alexandrite in the third-season premiere. In the third-season episode "Alone at Sea", in the aftermath of Malachite's separation, Malachite is used as a metaphor for an abusive relationship; and her grotesque appearance has been described as reflecting the relationship's unhealthiness.
- Rainbow Quartz: The fusion of Rose Quartz and Pearl. Her only fully formed appearance was in the flashback episode “We Need To Talk”, where she took the form of an elegant dancer wearing a leotard and leggings and had no spoken lines. Rose and Pearl's first attempt to fuse, inspired by Garnet, was a turning point in the history of the Crystal Gem rebellion.
  - Rainbow Quartz 2.0 (voiced by Alastair James): The fusion of Pearl and Steven, who uses a parasol created from Pearl's spear and Steven's shield. Their design and characterization resembles a combination of Mary Poppins and Bert from the film Mary Poppins.
- Sardonyx (voiced by Alexia Khadime): The fusion of Garnet and Pearl, who has the personality of an elegant and attention-seeking entertainer. She can combine Garnet's gauntlets and Pearl's spear into a giant sledgehammer. A major plot arc in the second season, advertised as the "Week of Sardonyx", deals with Pearl tricking Garnet into fusing for fabricated reasons, and the emotional consequences of that violation.
- Smoky Quartz (voiced by Natasha Lyonne): The fusion of Steven and Amethyst. Smoky Quartz first appears in the third-season episode "Earthlings", formed during a moment of commiseration between Steven and Amethyst over their shared fears of not being able to live up to their potential. Smoky has a playful, self-effacing personality, and can combine Steven's shield and Amethyst's whip into a massive yo-yo that they use in combat.
- Sunstone (voiced by Shoniqua Shandai): The fusion of Steven and Garnet, described by reviewer Eric Thurm as "a loose parody of kid-friendly ’80s action characters". They can attach Steven's shield to Garnet's gauntlets to use as suction cups.
- Obsidian (voiced by Zach Callison, Michaela Dietz, Deedee Magno Hall, and Estelle): The fusion of Steven, Amethyst, Pearl, and Garnet, a lava-skinned giant who first appeared in the fifth-season finale. Obsidian can combine their components' weapons into the hilt of a giant sword, producing a blade from the magma in their second mouth. The original form of Obsidian, containing Rose Quartz rather than Steven, was the basis for the design of the Crystal Gems' temple.
- Steg (voiced by Ted Leo): The fusion of Steven and Greg, appearing in Steven Universe: The Movie.
- Mega Pearl (voiced by Deedee Magno Hall): The fusion of Pearl with "Volleyball", the pink Pearl who once served Pink Diamond. First appears in the fourth episode of Steven Universe Future, ‘Volleyball' .

=== Sentient plants ===
==== Watermelon Stevens ====
The Watermelon Stevens are living watermelons shaped like Steven, created in the first-season episode "Watermelon Steven" as a result of Steven's ability to create sentient plants. Soon after their creation, they go on a rampage in Beach City, but after being reprimanded by Steven for their actions, they leave Beach City and form a civilization on the remote Mask Island. This civilization is shown to develop throughout the show, and helps fight off Lapis and Jasper's fusion, Malachite. They sometimes serve as vessels that Steven can project his mind into.

==== Pumpkin ====
Pumpkin is a living pumpkin that behaves like a dog. It was created by Steven in the fourth-season episode "Gem Harvest", and adopted as a pet by Peridot and Lapis.
