= Grace Rolek =

American actress and musician

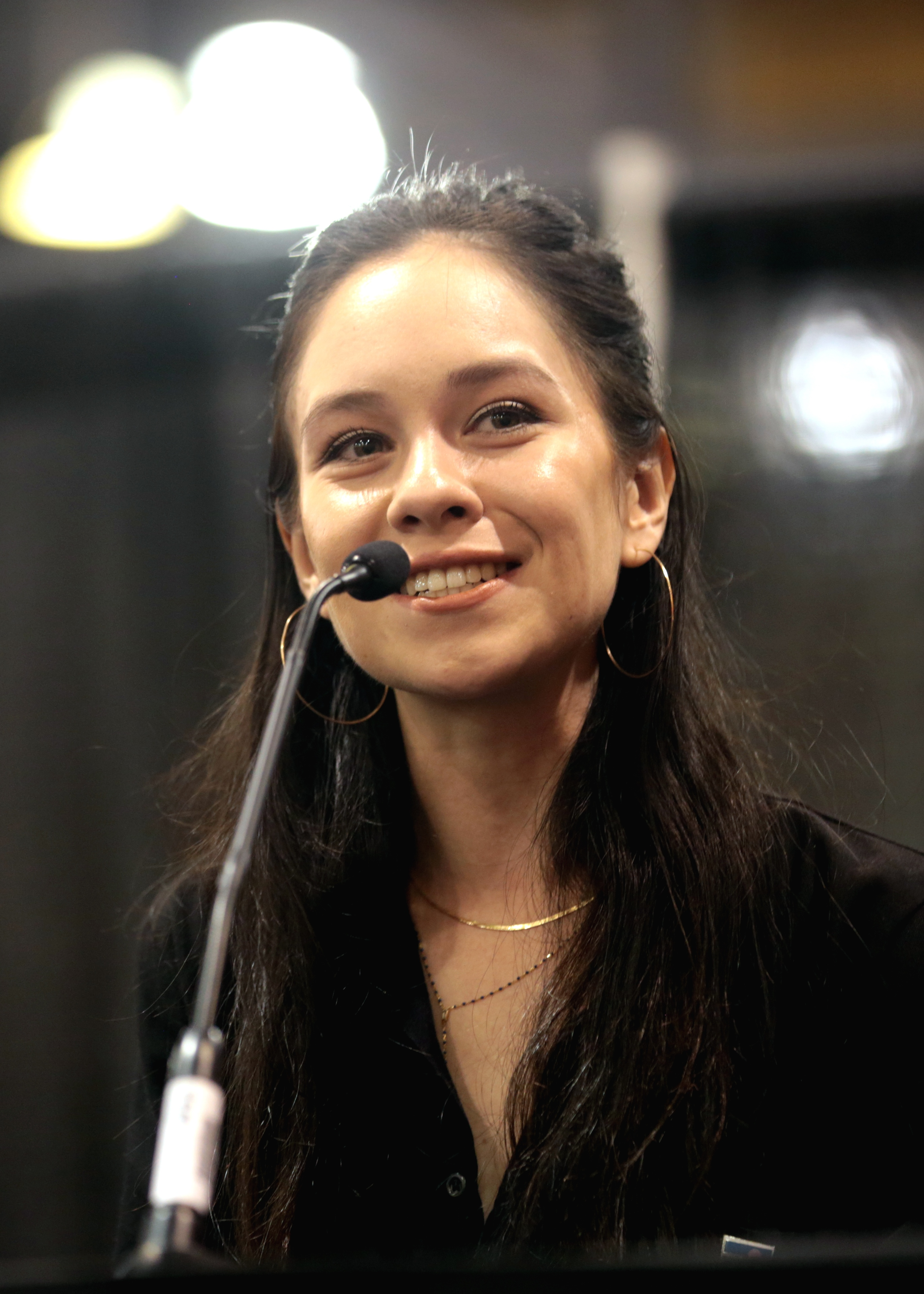
- Rolek at Phoenix Comicon in November 2017

Background information
- Born: Grace Sakura Rolek; October 10, 1997 (age 29); Burbank, California, U.S.
- Genre: Alternative rock
- Occupations: Actress; Musician
- Instrument: Bass guitar
- Years active: 2004–present
- Member of: Starling

Grace Sakura Rolek (born October 10, 1997) is an American actress and musician. Rolek is also the bassist for the band Starling.

As an actress, she features across numerous TV and film roles as Connie Maheswaran, Steven's best friend and eventual girlfriend on the Cartoon Network animated series Steven Universe and its two follow-ups, Steven Universe: The Movie and Steven Universe Future. As a musician, Rolek worked as a vocalist on the Steven Universe. In 2024, she became the bassist for four-piece alternative rock band, Starling. They went on to release their first EP in 2024 the same year, and toured with She's Green as their opening act. In 2025, the band released their second EP "Forgive Me."

== Career ==
=== Acting ===
Rolek is known for voicing Connie Maheswaran on Steven Universe, as well as for appearing in Happiness Is a Warm Blanket, Charlie Brown, radio host for Appalachia radio in Fallout 76, and Final Fantasy VII: Advent Children. She also made voice acting appearances in Cloudy with a Chance of Meatballs, Kung Fu Panda: Secrets of the Furious Five and Horton Hears a Who!.

She made several public appearances as a guest of many fan conventions and gatherings, such as Cartoon Fair in France, Florida Supercon in Miami, and Beach City Con in Virginia Beach.

In addition to voice acting, Rolek made her directorial debut on her short film Mailboxes with fellow Steven Universe crewmate Zach Callison.

=== Musician ===
In the 2010s, Rolek began writing and recording music. While working as a voice actor on Steven Universe, she featured as a vocalist on the official soundtrack, which was her first venture into music. In 2023, friend Kasha Souter-Willett required a bassist for her solo project, and Rolek agreed to start playing bass for her. A year later in 2024, this grew from a solo project to become the band Starling. Gitai Vinshtok and Erik Sathrum Johnson joined as the two additional members, and the band was officially formed in 2024.

Starling has since gone on multiple tours in the United States, opening for numerous acts. This has included indie rock band She's Green, and other acts including trio Cryogeyser and shoegaze band, Glixen.

Starling has released three EPs since forming. In September 2024 their debut EP "2324" was released independently, with the second EP "Forgive Me" following shortly after in June 2025 through the label Sunday Drive Records. Starling's third EP "Plexus" was released September 2026 via Broke Records.

== Personal life ==
Rolek is of African-American, Italian, Polish, and Japanese descent.

Rolek is bisexual.

== Filmography ==
Television roles
Year	Title	Role	Notes
2004	George Lopez	Sara	Episode: "E.I.? E.I. OH"
2006–2008	Lou and Lou: Safety Patrol	Louise	Voice, main role
2008	Handy Manny	Nelson	Voice, episode: "Bake Sale/Camping Tools"
2009	Special Agent Oso	Molly	Voice, episode: "To Grandma With Love/Gold Flower"
2013–2019	Steven Universe	Connie Maheswaran	Voice, main cast
2020	Steven Universe Future	Connie Maheswaran	Voice, 6 episodes

Film roles
Year	Title	Role	Notes
2004	U.S. Air Marshals	Little Girl	Short film
2004	Mulan II	Additional voices	Direct-to-video
2005	Tarzan II	Additional voices	Direct-to-video
2005	Nausicaä of the Valley of the Wind	Additional voices	2005 Disney dub
2005	Final Fantasy VII: Advent Children	Marlene Wallace	Voice
2005	Kronk's New Groove	Additional voices	Direct-to-video
2007	Meet the Robinsons	Additional voices	
2007	The Killer	Girl in Blue	Short film
2008	Horton Hears a Who!	Additional voices	
2008	Kung Fu Panda: Secrets of the Furious Five	Shy Bunny	Voice, short film
2009	An American Girl: Chrissa Stands Strong	Additional voices	Direct-to-video; uncredited
2009	Imagine That	Additional voices	Uncredited
2009	Cloudy with a Chance of Meatballs	Additional voices	
2011	Happiness Is a Warm Blanket, Charlie Brown	Lucy Van Pelt	Voice, direct-to-video
2015	So Wildly	Chloe	Short film
2018	Mailboxes	Gertrude	Short film; writer and director
2019	Steven Universe: The Movie	Connie Maheswaran	Voice, television film
2026	Other Half	Jade	Short film

Video game roles
Year	Title	Role	Source
2006	Dirge of Cerberus: Final Fantasy VII	Additional voices	
2012	Guild Wars 2	Helena	
2017	Steven Universe: Save the Light	Connie Maheswaran	
2019	Steven Universe: The Phantom Fable	Connie Maheswaran	
2019	Steven Universe: Unleash the Light	Connie Maheswaran	
2020	Fallout 76: Wastelanders	Julie	
