= She's Green =

American indie rock band

she's green
- Origin: Minneapolis, Minnesota, U.S.
- Genres: Indie rock; shoegaze; dream pop
- Years active: 2022–present
- Label: Photo Finish Records
- Members: Zofia Smith; Liam Armstrong; Raines Lucas; Teddy Nordvold; Kevin Seebeck

She's Green (stylized in all lowercase) is an American indie rock band originating from Minneapolis, Minnesota. The band, which began performing in 2022, consists of vocalist Zofia Smith, guitarists Liam Armstrong and Raines Lucas, bassist Teddy Nordvold, and drummer Kevin Seebeck.

== History ==
She's Green began doing live performances in 2022. Zofia Smith and Liam Armstrong had already been collaborating throughout the pandemic as roommates; Armstrong, who worked at the Minneapolis radio station Radio K, recruited coworker Teddy Nordvold. They began receiving attention for their 2022 singles "Smile Again" and "Mandy" and started collaborating with other bands such as Slow Pulp. They released their debut EP Wisteria in June 2023. The tracks featured on the EP were created in Armstrong's bedroom and basement. In February 2025, soon after signing with New York City-based record label Photo Finish Records, the band released a new single "Graze", paired with a music video shot by Armstrong.

== Discography ==
=== Studio Albums ===
- swallowtail (2026)

=== EPs ===
- Wisteria (2023)
- Chrysalis (2025)

=== Singles ===
- "River" (2022)
- "Smile Again" (2022)
- "Mandy (Demo)" (2022)
- "Smile Again" (2022)
- "Bleed" (2023)
- "Graze" (2025)
- “Figurines” (2025)
- “Willow” (2025)
- “mettle” (2026)
- “paper thin” (2026)
- "empty house" (2026)
- "close your eyes" (2026)
