= Shelby Rabara =

American actress and dancer (born 1983)

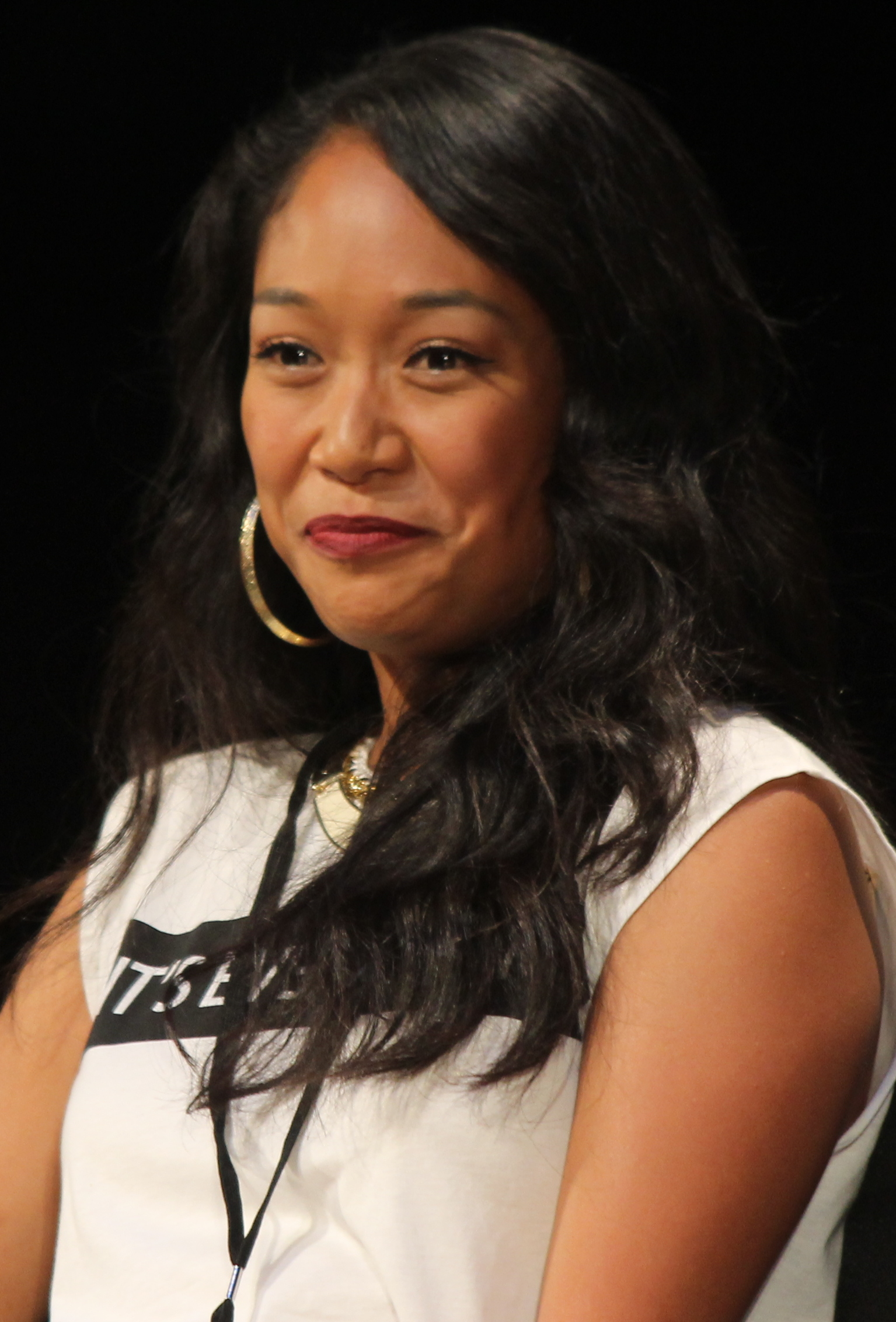
- Rabara at the Florida Supercon in 2016
- Born: Shelby Ann Narito Rabara; October 5, 1983 (age 43); Orange County, California, U.S.
- Education: University of California, Los Angeles
- Occupations: Actress, dancer
- Years active: 2004–present
- Spouse: Harry Shum Jr. (m. 2015)
- Children: 1

Shelby Ann Narito Rabara Shum (née Rabara; born October 5, 1983) is an American actress and dancer who has appeared in a number of films, television series and commercials as both an actress and a dancer. Rabara is known for providing the voice of Peridot for the Steven Universe franchise on Cartoon Network.

== Early life ==
Rabara was born in Orange County, California. She was raised by her mother in a single-parent household, along with her two siblings. She graduated with a degree in world arts and cultures from the University of California, Los Angeles in 2003.

== Career ==
Rabara initially began her career as a dancer and was a member of the Laker Girls, the cheerleading squad of the Los Angeles Lakers basketball team. In 2005 she won a role at her very first audition, which was for the sitcom Grounded for Life. She said, in response to autistic fans of Peridot, the character she voices in Steven Universe and Steven Universe Future, that she was "happy that I can voice a character that gives people on the spectrum somebody to identify with."

== Personal life ==
Rabara is of Filipino descent.

Rabara began a relationship with actor and dancer Harry Shum Jr. in 2007. The two became engaged in October 2013 while on vacation in Hawaii and were married on November 22, 2015, in Costa Rica. The birth of their daughter was announced on March 28, 2019.

== Filmography ==
=== Live-action ===
==== Film ====
Year	Title	Role	Notes
2009	Spring Breakdown	Sorority Girl	
2009	17 Again	Cheerleader (1989)	
2009	Dance Flick	Ballet Dancer	
2009	Fame	Dancer	
2009	A Fuchsia Elephant	Shelby	Short film
2010	The LXD: The Uprising Begins	The Dark Nurse	
2011	The LXD: Rise of the Drifts	Bella / Dark Nurse	
2014	Ballon	Marin	Short film

==== Television ====
Year	Title	Role	Notes
2005	Grounded for Life	Jessica	Episode: "Crazy"; replacing Miranda Cosgrove
2005	The Bold and the Beautiful	Cheerleader	Episode: "Episode #1.4482"
2007	Cold Case	80s Female Teen Dancer	Episode: "Shuffle, Ball Change"
2007	Greek	Zeta Beta Sorority Girl	Episode: "The Rusty Nail"
2007	Viva Laughlin	Casino Dancer	Episode: "Pilot"
2008	My Name Is Earl	Jenny	Episode: "Quit Your Snitchin'"
2009	House M.D.	Corps Dancer	Episode: "Under My Skin"
2009	Community	Randi	Episode: "Home Economics"
2009–2010	Glee	Shoshandra	2 episodes
2010–2011	The Legion of Extraordinary Dancers	Bella / Dark Nurse	5 episodes
2011	CSI: Crime Scene Investigation	Dancer #7	Episode: "All That Cremains"
2013	Bunheads	Dancer #2	Episode: "Next"
2015	Dr. Ken	Dancer #1	Episode: "Pilot"
2016	2 Broke Girls	Girlfriend	Episode: "And the Sax Problem"
2016	Awkward.	Mia	Recurring
2016–2019	Goliath	Sumi Sen	Recurring; 11 episodes
2017	Me and My Grandma	Heidi	Main role; 6 episodes
2022	Dollface	Lucy	S02E02 "Right-Hand Woman"
2023	9-1-1: Lone Star	Tabitha	S04E013 "open"

=== Voice roles ===
==== Film ====
Year	Title	Role	Notes
2019	Steven Universe: The Movie	Peridot	
2026	Toy Story 5	Snappy	

==== Television ====
Year	Title	Role	Notes
2015–2019	Steven Universe	Peridot	Recurring role; 36 episodes
2019–2020	Steven Universe Future	Peridot	5 episodes
2022	Samurai Rabbit: The Usagi Chronicles	Kitsune	Main role
