= Jennifer Paz =

Filipino actress (born 1974)

- Born: April 24, 1974 (age 52); Manila, Philippines
- Education: University of Washington
- Occupation: Actress
- Years active: 1992–present
- Spouse: Anthony Fedorov (m. 2019)
- Children: 1

Jennifer Paz-Fedorov (born April 24, 1974) is a Filipino actress. She is mostly known for her recurring role as Lapis Lazuli in Steven Universe and Steven Universe Future.

== Career ==
The youngest of four children, Paz moved with her family at the age of 5 from the Philippines to Seattle, where her mother's brother was living at the time.

After completing her freshman year at the University of Washington in Seattle, Paz - then at the age of 21 - played the alternate of the lead role of Kim in the 1st National Miss Saigon US Tour. Since this professional debut, Paz has received multi-award nominations and wins including a 2008 LA Stage Alliance Ovation Award for Best Lead Actress, and has since reprised her role in Miss Saigon in various regional productions. She appeared on Broadway in Les Miserables and in the pre-Broadway run of David Henry Hwang's revised Flower Drum Song at the Los Angeles Mark Taper Forum in the role of Mei-Li during the production's celebrated 5-week extension.

In 2013, Paz returned to playing the lead role of Kim in Miss Saigon at the Casa Mañana theatre.

Paz is known for providing the voice of Lapis Lazuli and part of the voice of Malachite on the Cartoon Network television series, Steven Universe. Paz is a recipient of the 2022/23 NAMT (National Alliance of Musical Theatre) Writers Residency Grant and winner of the Outstanding Screenplays TV Pilot Competition 2021 for her original comedy "Proud Marys."

== Personal life ==
Paz became engaged to boyfriend Anthony Fedorov on December 25, 2012. Their son, Julian Paz Fedorov, was born on April 1, 2013.

== Filmography ==
Live action
Year	Film	Role	Notes
1993	The Legend II	Ting Ting (voice)	
1994	The Defender	Michelle Yeung (English version, voice)	
1996	High Tide	Toni Green	One Episode: Mission Improbable
1996	Santa with Muscles	Helen Chu	
1998	Girl	Barn Girl #1	
1998	Can't Hardly Wait	Girl Mike Hits On #2	
1999	Touched by an Angel	Am-Nhac Nguyen	One Episode: Made in the U.S.A.
2003	The Yellow Truth	Na-Ta-Ta Weeeeee	
Animation
Year	Title	Role	Notes
1997	The Angry Beavers	Singer (voice)	Two Episodes: Beach Beavers A-Go-Go, Deranged Ranger
2000	As Told by Ginger	Tracy / Traci (voice)	Two Episodes: Of Lice and Friends, Sleep on It
2003	The Electric Piper	Betty Robinson (voice)	TV film
2014–19	Steven Universe	Lapis Lazuli / Malachite (with Kimberly Brooks) / Cluster (voice)	19 episodes
2019	Steven Universe: The Movie	Lapis Lazuli (voice)	
2019–20	Steven Universe Future	Lapis Lazuli / Nice Lapis / Mean Lapis (voice)	3 episodes
Video games
Year	Title	Role	Notes
2017	Steven Universe: Save the Light	Lapis Lazuli	
2019	Steven Universe: Unleash the Light	Lapis Lazuli	

== Recordings ==
- The Lost Chords: Cinderella - "I Lost My Heart At the Ball", "The Face That I See in the Night"
- Walt Disney Records The Legacy Collection: Cinderella - "I Lost My Heart At the Ball", "The Face That I See in the Night"
- Awakening - Featured Vocals
- The Lost Chords: The Rescuers - "The Need to Be Loved"
- Steven Universe, Vol. 2 (Original Soundtrack) - "That Distant Shore"
- Steven Universe the Movie (Original Soundtrack) - "Happily Ever After", "Who We Are", "Finale"
- Steven Universe Future (Original Soundtrack) - “Shining Through”
