= Zach Callison =

American actor (born 1997)

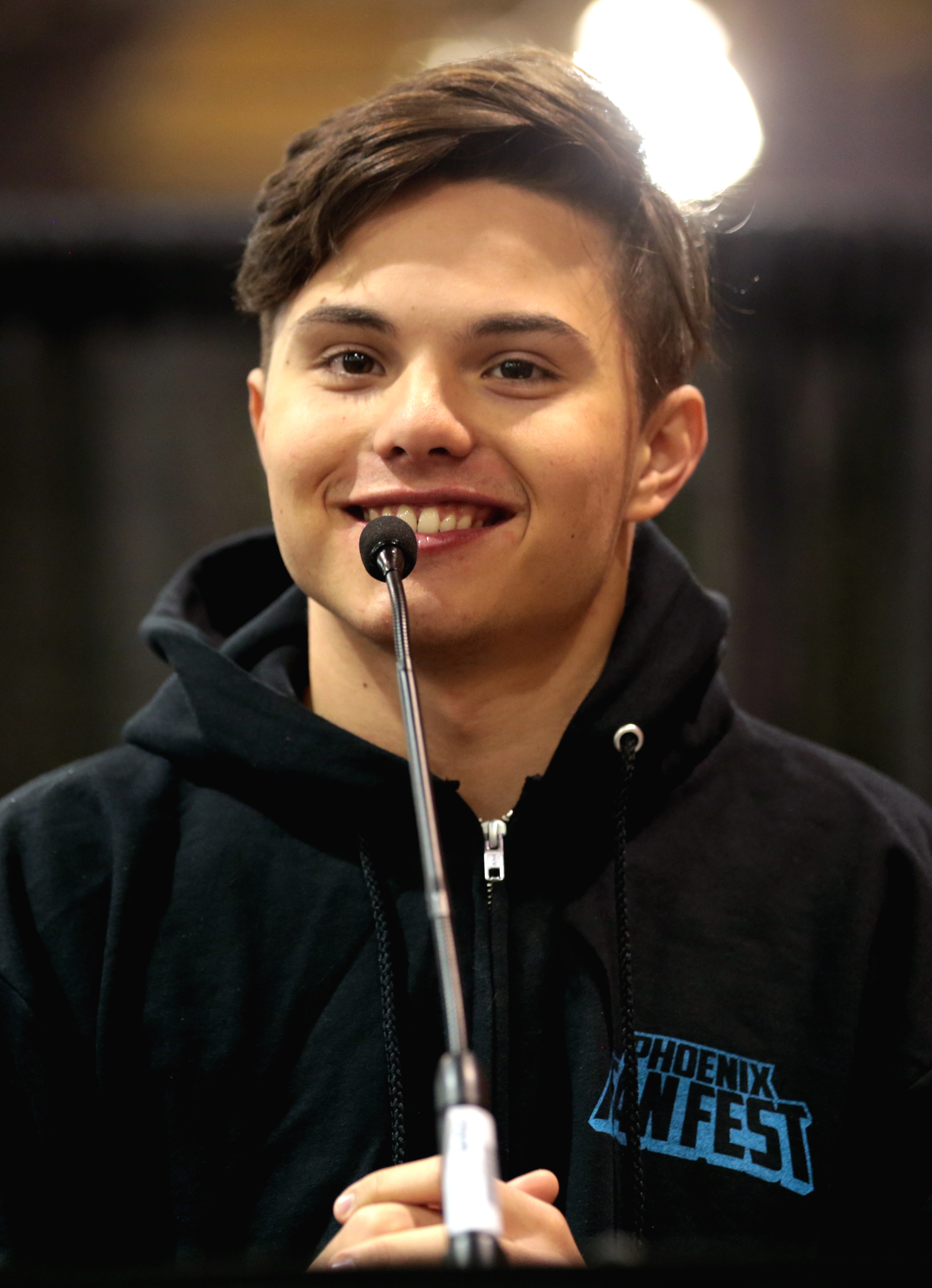
- Callison in 2017
- Born: Zachry Dean Callison; October 23, 1997 (age 28); St. Louis, Missouri, U.S.
- Occupations: Actor; singer
- Years active: 2007–present
- Musical career
- Genres: Alt-rock; rap rock; pop rock
- Instruments: Vocals; Piano

Zachry Dean Callison (born October 23, 1997) is an American actor and singer. He is primarily known as the voice of the titular character Steven in the Steven Universe franchise.

== Career ==
Callison began acting on television in 2009, with a recurring role on Diary of a Single Mom. For the next few years, he had a variety of one-off television roles. In 2013, he was cast in the main voice role of Prince James on Sofia the First, and in the lead voice role of Steven Universe. He is also known for his role as Billy from I'm in the Band and additional voices from Kinect Disneyland Adventures. He voiced King Tut in Mr. Peabody & Sherman, Young Jiro in The Wind Rises, and Billy Batson in the direct-to-video films Superman/Shazam!: The Return of Black Adam and Justice League: War.

In January 2018, Callison released his debut single, "War!", followed by the singles "Curtain Call" and "She Don't Know". In August 2018, he released his debut EP, A Picture Perfect Hollywood Heartbreak. The EP is a concept album about celebrity life and mental illness revolving around the protagonist's breakup with a mysterious woman named Juanita, as well as his thoughts of suicide and substance abuse. Callison detailed his inspiration behind the album, saying "It's also a commentary on a lot of young actors and artists who have lost the battle; there's been a lot of dead 20 and 21-year-olds in the industry this year, some of whom I knew or admired. I don't know how we fix the problem, but I needed to say something." In 2018, he starred as a magician in the music video for Nathan Sharp's song "Phantom".

== Personal life ==
Zachry Dean Callison was born on October 23, 1997. He is a youth representative for the Sea Shepherd Conservation Society. He graduated from Oak Park High School in Oak Park, California on June 11, 2015. (Note: ABC 7 says that Oak Park's 2015 graduation was on June 11.)

== Filmography ==
=== Live-action ===
Television
Year	Title	Role	Notes
2009	Are You Smarter than a 5th Grader?	Himself	
2009–2010	Diary of a Single Mom	Ian	Recurring
2010	Hannah Montana	Douglas	Episode: "Hannah's Gonna Get This"
2011	Funny or Die Presents	Lonni Donovan	1 episode
2011	Perfect Couples	Young Dave	Episode: "Perfect Crime"
2011	I'm in the Band	King Billy	Episode: "Lord of the Weasels"
2011	iCarly	10-Year-Old Boy #1 (voice)	Episode: "iStill Psycho"
2012	Little Brother	Ethan	TV pilot
2014	NCIS: Los Angeles	Devin Johnson	Episode: "Reign Fall"
2015	Fresh Off the Boat	Dan	Episode: "Miracle on Dead Street"
2015	Henry Danger	Chet	Episode: "Henry's Jelly"
2015	Astrid Clover	Hipster 2	Episode: "#Holiday (full)"
2016	Sanders Shorts	Steven	Episode: "Life with the Crystal Gems is Tough"
2016–2019	Just Add Magic	Chuck Hankins/Charles Peizer	Recurring
2016–2021	The Goldbergs	Brian Corbett	Recurring
2017	Record Rant	Zach	1 episode
2017	Suspense	Scooter Stevens	Episode: "Indomitable the Magnificent"
2017	Micah the Asshole Ghost	Micah	TV pilot
2017	Grey's Anatomy: B-Team	Oscar	Episode: "Two"
2018	Stream of Many Eyes	Werblund	TV pilot

Film
Year	Title	Role	Notes
2007	Ghost Image	Keiner Plaza Pedestrian	
2009	Land of the Lost	Tar Pits Kid	Uncredited
2010	Kingshighway	Dominic	
2012	Rock Jocks	Dylan	
2012	Ultraman Zero: The Revenge of Belial	Nao	US dub
2013	All American Christmas Carol	Bully Johnny	
2015	The Sound of Magic	Peasant Boy	
2015	A Terrible Fate	Ben	Short film
2018	Mailboxes	Lionel	Short film
2019	Skywatch	Shaun	Short film

=== Animation ===
List of voice performances in animation
Year	Title	Role	Notes
2010	Scooby-Doo! Mystery Incorporated	Arthur Baywosenthal, Child #6, Child #7	Episode: "The Song of Mystery"
2010	Sym-Bionic Titan	Arthur	Episode: "Shadows of Youth"
2010	Superman/Shazam!: The Return of Black Adam	Billy Batson	Short film; direct-to-video
2012	The Legend of Korra	Skoochy, Young Tarrlock	Voice, 2 episodes
2012–2015	Sofia the First	Prince James	Voice, main role (Season 1-early Season 2)
2013	The Wind Rises	Young Jiro Horikoshi	Voice (English dub)
2013–2019	Steven Universe	Steven Universe, Onion, Pumpkin, Pebbles, Watermelon Stevens, Obsidian, additional voices	Voice, main role
2014	Justice League: War	Billy Batson	Voice, direct-to-video
2014	Mr. Peabody & Sherman	King Tut	Voice
2016	Hulk: Where Monsters Dwell	Eric / Ninja	Voice, direct-to-video
2016	Uncle Grandpa	Steven Universe	Voice, episode: "Pizza Eve"
2019	Steven Universe: The Movie	Steven Universe	Voice, television film
2019–2022	DreamWorks Dragons: Rescue Riders	Winger	Voice, main role
2019–2020	Steven Universe Future	Steven Universe, Onion, Pumpkin, Cactus Steven, Jingle Singer, Topiary Stevens	Voice, main role
2019–2020	Cleopatra in Space	Zuzz	Voice, recurring role
2019	Lego DC Batman: Family Matters	Billy Batson	Voice, direct-to-video
2020	Lego DC Shazam! Magic and Monsters	Billy Batson, Jimmy Olsen	Voice, direct-to-video
2021	Batman: The Long Halloween, Part Two	Young Bruce Wayne	Voice, direct-to-video
2021	Injustice	Damian Wayne, Jimmy Olsen	Voice, direct-to-video
2024	Justice League: Crisis on Infinite Earths	Robin / Dick Grayson of Earth-Two, Robin / Damian Wayne	Voice, direct-to-video

Video games
Year	Title	Role
2011	Kinect: Disneyland Adventures	Additional voices
2015	Steven Universe: Attack the Light	Steven Universe
2017	Steven Universe: Save the Light	Steven Universe, Onion, Pumpkin
2018	Lego DC Super-Villains	Billy Batson
2019	Steven Universe: Unleash the Light	Steven Universe, Onion, Pumpkin
2019	Steven Universe: The Phantom Fable	Steven Universe

== Discography ==
=== EPs ===
List of albums, with selected information
Title	Album details
A Picture Perfect Hollywood Heartbreak	Released: August 3, 2018; Label: Self-released; Formats: CD, digital download

=== Soundtrack albums ===
List of albums, with selected information
Title	Album details	Peak chart positions					
Title	Album details	US	US OST	US Kids	US Indie	BEL Flanders	UK OST
Steven Universe, Vol. 1 (Original Soundtrack)	Released: June 2, 2017; Label: Cartoon Network Music; Formats: digital download, LP	22	2	10	1	174	9
Steven Universe, Vol. 2 (Original Soundtrack)	Released: April 12, 2019; Label: Cartoon Network Music; Formats: Digital download	— (Note: "Steven Universe, Vol. 2 (Original Soundtrack)" did not enter the Billboard 200, but did chart at number 23 on the Billboard Digital Albums chart)	24	14	28	—	—
Steven Universe the Movie (Original Soundtrack)	Released: September 3, 2019; Label: Cartoon Network Music; Formats: Digital download, LP	57	5	2	6	—	—
Steven Universe Future (Original Soundtrack)	Released: October 23, 2020; Label: Cartoon Network Music; Formats: Digital download	—	—	—	—	—	—

=== Singles ===
List of albums, with selected information
Title	Year	Peak chart positions	Album
Title	Year	US Kid Digital	Album
"War!"	2018	—	A Picture Perfect Hollywood Heartbreak
"Curtain Call"	2018	—	A Picture Perfect Hollywood Heartbreak
"She Don't Know"	2018	—	A Picture Perfect Hollywood Heartbreak
"Nightmare"	2018	—	
"For Just One Day Let's Only Think About (Love)" (with Uzo Aduba, Shelby Rabara, Tom Scharpling, Michaela Dietz, Deedee Magno Hall, & Estelle)	2018	—	Steven Universe, Vol. 2 (Original Soundtrack)
"We Deserve to Shine" (with Charlyne Yi, Erica Luttrell, Estelle, Deedee Magno Hall, Michaela Dietz, Grace Rolek, & AJ Michalka)	2018	—	Steven Universe, Vol. 2 (Original Soundtrack)
"Familiar"	2018	—	Steven Universe, Vol. 2 (Original Soundtrack)
"Escapism" (with AJ Michalka & Grace Rolek)	2019	—	Steven Universe, Vol. 2 (Original Soundtrack)
"We Are the Crystal Gems (Change Your Mind Version)"	2019	—	Steven Universe, Vol. 2 (Original Soundtrack)
"Change Your Mind"	2019	—	Steven Universe, Vol. 2 (Original Soundtrack)
"True Kinda Love" (with Estelle)	2019	8	Steven Universe: The Movie (Original Soundtrack)
"Other Friends" (with Sarah Stiles, Deedee Magno Hall, Estelle, & Michaela Dietz)	2019	1	Steven Universe: The Movie (Original Soundtrack)
"I'd Rather Be Me (With You)"	2020	—	Steven Universe Future (Original Soundtrack)

== Awards and nominations ==
Callison was nominated for "Best Performance in a Voice-Over Role (Television) – Young Actor" category in the 34th Young Artist Awards which he shared with Jake Sim. He was also nominated in the "Best Performance in a Feature Film – Supporting Young Actor" for his role in "Rock Jocks". In 2012, he was nominated in the "Best Performance in a TV Series – Guest Starring Young Actor 11-13" for his role in Disney's I'm in the Band.

Year	Category	Award	Result
2012	Best Performance in a TV Series – Guest Starring Young Actor 11-13 (I'm in the Band)	Young Artist Awards	Nominated
2013	Best Performance in a Feature Film – Supporting Young Actor (Rock Jocks)	Young Artist Awards	Nominated
2013	Best Performance in a Voice-Over Role (Television) – Young Actor (Sofia the First)	Young Artist Awards	Won
2014	Best Male Vocal Performance by a Child (Steven Universe)	Behind The Voice Actor Awards	Nominated
2014	Best Performance in a Voice-Over Role – Young Actor (Steven Universe)	Young Artist Award	Nominated
2014	Best Performance in a DVD Film – Young Actor (All American Christmas Carol)	Young Artist Award	Won
2016	Young Artist Award Best Performance in a TV Series – Guest Starring Young Actor (14 -21) Henry Danger	Young Artist Award	Nominated
