= Steven the Sword Fighter =

- Steven Universe episode
- Holo-Pearl attacks.
- Episode no.: Season 1 Episode 16
- Directed by: Ki-Yong Bae (animation); Seon-Jae Lee (animation); Seo Whan Kim (animation); Elle Michalka (art); Ian Jones-Quartey (supervising)
- Written by: Joe Johnston; Jeff Liu
- Production code: 1020-013
- Original air date: April 9, 2014
- Running time: 11 minutes

Episode chronology
← Previous "Onion Trade"	Next → "Lion 2: The Movie"

"Steven the Sword Fighter" is the sixteenth episode of the first season of the American animated television series Steven Universe. It is written by Joe Johnston and Jeff Liu. The episode shows Pearl attempting to teach Steven the art of sword-fighting using a holographic version of herself. However, during the lessons, Pearl gets injured and retreats into her gem to heal and make a new body to project.

In the United States, the episode originally aired on Cartoon Network on April 9, 2014, the first new episode to air on the series' new Wednesday time slot. The episode was viewed by 1.098 million viewers, becoming the thirty-sixth most watched episode aired by the network for the week of April 7 to April 13, 2014.

== Plot ==
While Steven (Zach Callison), Garnet (Estelle), Amethyst (Michaela Dietz) and Pearl (Deedee Magno Hall) are watching the fictional Japanese movie Lonely Blade, Pearl critiques the film's sword fighting techniques and offers to give Steven a proper demonstration. At her arena, Pearl summons "Holo-Pearl", a holographic version of herself to spar with. After Pearl wins a sparring match with Holo-Pearl, she begins to show Steven the basics of sword-fighting. However, Pearl's lessons bore Steven, making him clamor for Pearl to teach him the signature move from the Lonely Blade movie, much to Pearl's chagrin. While Pearl is distracted talking to Steven, Holo-Pearl impales Pearl with her sword, which causes Pearl to lose her physical form, leaving nothing but her gemstone. Although Steven is distraught, Garnet and Amethyst assure him that Pearl has simply retreated into her gem and will return, projecting a new body, once she has healed.

Two weeks pass, and Pearl is still healing inside her gem. Steven decides to use Holo-Pearl as a replacement for the real Pearl. However, Holo-Pearl only knows how to sword fight, seeing everything as a potential opponent. Garnet and Amethyst urge Steven to stop using it and wait for the real Pearl to come back. After Holo-Pearl cuts down the real Pearl's favorite tree, Steven becomes infuriated and tries to drive Holo-Pearl away.

Later that night, Holo-Pearl continues to ask Steven to be challenged in combat, though he repeatedly refuses. But when she destroys the television, Steven becomes fed up and fights back against Holo-Pearl, accidentally activating her "advanced" mode. After an intense fight, Steven is able to destroy Holo-Pearl permanently. Garnet and Amethyst hear the commotion and come to check on Steven; and while he is explaining what he has learned, Pearl finally regenerates with a new outfit and faces the mess left from what recently happened, while Steven happily parades around celebrating her return.

== Production ==
The episode was written by Joe Johnston and Jeff Liu. Ki-Yong Bae, Seon-Jae Lee and Seo Whan Kim provided animation direction, Elle Michalka served as art director, and Ian Jones-Quartey provided supervising direction. A sneak peek of the episode was shared on io9 on April 7, 2014, with Johnston first announcing the episode on the series' production blog the following day, shortly after the series' new Wednesday time slot was promoted on April 2. In addition, several promotional pieces were published by him, Rebecca Sugar and color stylist Tiffany Ford, encouraging followers to watch. A panel from the storyboard was also promoted, before various background art and animation props were released before and after its premiere; the animation props indicate the episode was produced thirteenth in production order.

The soundtrack features the instrumental pieces "Dance of Swords" and "Holo Pearl" by pianist Aivi Tran and sound designer Steven Velema of the musical group Aivi & Surasshu. The latter track was composed to resemble the "broken facsimile" nature of the Pearl clone who bears the song's title. The group utilized a "glitchy" piano and "an erratic collection of sounds" for it. The tracks were released onto SoundCloud on April 12 and 13, respectively.

== Cultural references ==
Gergo Vas from Kotaku observed various video game references during Pearl's lecture on swordfighting, including Pokémon, Final Fantasy VII, Gitaroo Man and Sonic the Hedgehog. In addition, he identified an homage to Revolutionary Girl Utena upon looking at GIFs of Pearl's sword-fighting scene with her hologram clone. Writing for Cartoon Brew, Kendra Beltran noted that Lonely Blade imitated the style of anime, stating that "while the Universe team didn't overdo the animation on the anime, you could tell what they were going for without hearing the accents."

== Reception ==
"Steven the Sword Fighter" was the first episode to premiere outside of Monday, onto its new time slot of Wednesdays, on Cartoon Network. Upon its premiere on April 9, 2014, the episode was seen by 1.098 million viewers. It received a Nielsen household rating of 0.7, and was ranked as the thirty-sixth most watched episode aired by the network for the week of April 7 to April 13, 2014.

Beltran highlighted elements of horror in the episode, noting it to come "in small spurts toward the end", while writing about the "eerie tone of the rainy night matched with the sword-wielding psychopath hologram." She found it "weird to see Steven trying to not replace her," regarding her as the established mother figure in the series. She concluded her review stating that while "not much for characterization," Amethyst and Garnet's acts of "sitcom comedy" were "the source of laughter this time around" for the series.

Eric Thurm of The A.V. Club graded the episode an A−, calling it, "in many ways, a perfect distillation of what makes Steven Universe special." He noted Steven's attempts to learn sword-fighting as a callback to the first episode, "Gem Glow", which aired alongside "Steven the Sword Fighter" upon its premiere. Finally, he contrasted Steven's childishness and refusal to completely learn lessons to Adventure Time and Regular Show, where the protagonists of each have taken steps toward maturity.
