= Michaela Dietz =

American voice actress

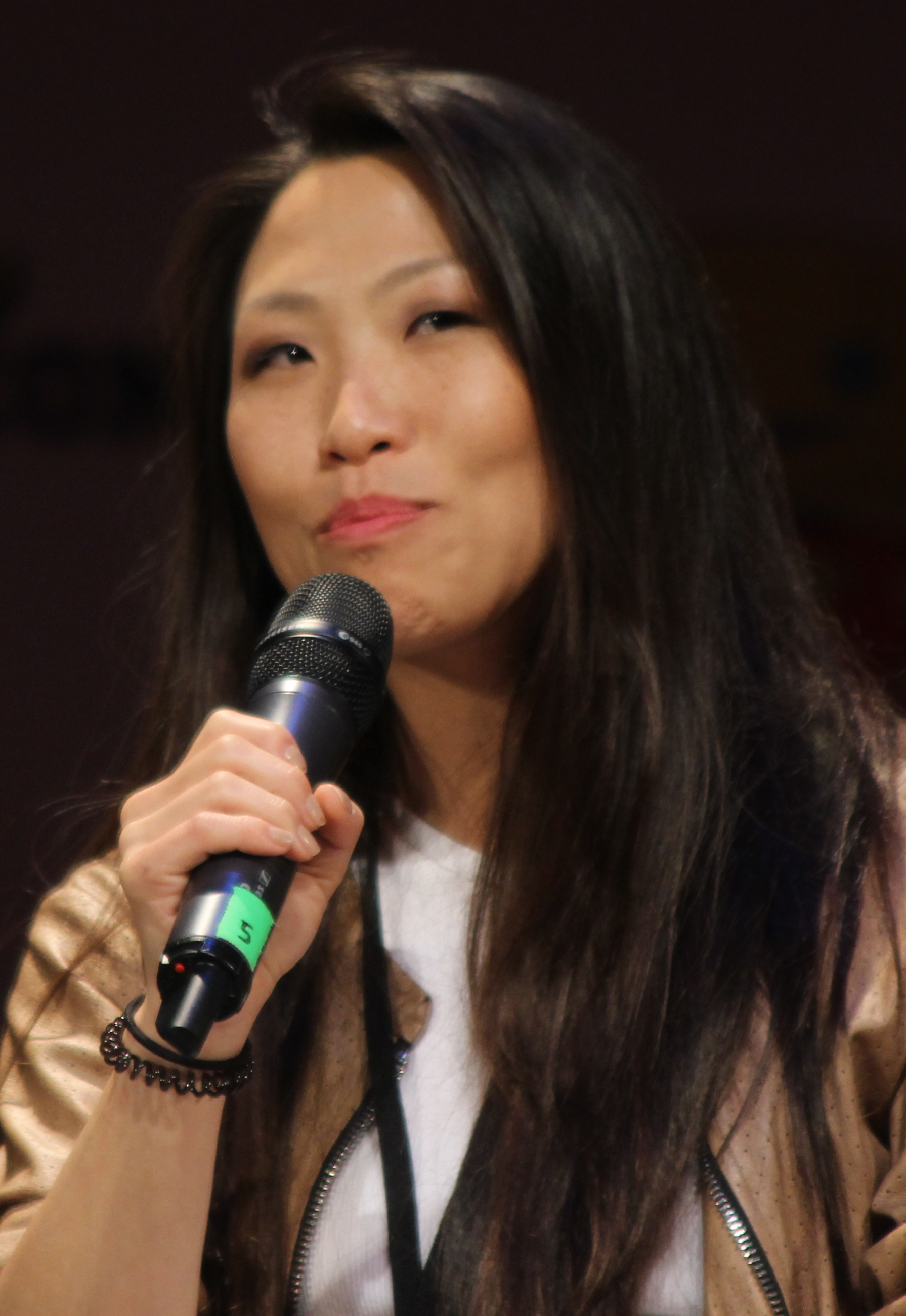
- Dietz at the 2016 Florida Supercon
- Born: 1982 or 1983 (age 43–44)} South Korea
- Education: Middlebury College
- Occupation: Voice actress
- Years active: 2005–present

Michaela Dietz (born 1982 or 1983) is an American voice actress. Starting her professional career in 2005, she voiced Riff on PBS children's television series Barney & Friends, Amethyst on Cartoon Network television series Steven Universe and Steven Universe Future, Dolly Dalmatian on Disney Channel's 101 Dalmatian Street, Pita in Fallout 76, Vee on Disney Channel's The Owl House, and Darryl McGee on Disney Channel's The Ghost and Molly McGee.

== Early life and career ==
Dietz was born in South Korea then was adopted and raised in Cooperstown, New York at three months old. She studied International Studies at Middlebury College. She has spoken about how her experience as an adoptee inspired her performance as Amethyst on Steven Universe.

Dietz began acting on television in 2005 with the role Ellie in Discover Me. She later appeared in a short in 2009 entitled Red, Black & Blonde as an Auditioning Dancer #1 and Interracial Couple #3 in K-Town.

== Later career ==
Dietz has voiced ongoing characters in two American children's animated TV series, Riff in Barney & Friends and Amethyst in the Steven Universe franchise. However, her role as Amethyst was the first time she had voiced an animated character.

She voiced Amethyst in the mobile games Cartoon Network Superstar Soccer: Goal (2014), Steven Universe: Attack the Light (2015), Steven Universe: Save the Light (2017), and Steven Universe: Unleash the Light (2019). In 2019, she voiced Amethyst in the TV film, Steven Universe: The Movie, a continuation from the Steven Universe animated series. She reprised the role in a 2021 anti-racism PSA by Rebecca Sugar and Ian Jones-Quartey.

She has since gone on to voice several characters for Disney, such as Dolly Dalmatian on 101 Dalmatian Street, Vee on The Owl House, and Darryl McGee on The Ghost and Molly McGee. She also voiced Glass Boy in the Adventure Time: Distant Lands episode "Obsidian", and Danelda in two episodes of Mighty Magiswords.

She also voiced Blue Behemoth in Kid Cosmic, and Dottie in two episodes of Tuca & Bertie. Additionally, she voiced various characters in Monsters at Work, Jennifer in an episode of Fairfax, and Michelle Green in four episodes of Craig of the Creek. (Note: The season 2 episode "Into the Overpast" and the season 3 episodes "The Rise and Fall of the Green Poncho", "Capture the Flag Part 3: The Legend", and "Capture the Flag Part 5: The Game".) She recently voiced Ariel in the 2022 episode, "Ariel Force One", of Middlemost Post.

She also voiced characters in video games such as Grand Theft Auto V, Fallout 76: Wastelanders, and Lego Dimensions.

In 2021, she voiced Tomas in the film, The Witcher: Nightmare of the Wolf. The previous year she provided narration for a series of narrated videos which were part of a Cartoon Network digital series celebrating Asian American and Pacific Islander Heritage Month.

In 2025, Dietz voiced Hannah Schwooper in Long Story Short. She also voiced Bex in Super Duper Bunny League.

== Filmography ==
=== Film ===
| Year | Film | Role | Notes |
|---|---|---|---|
| 2005 | Discover Me | Ellie | |
| 2009 | Red, Black & Blonde | Auditioning Dancer #1 | Short |
| 2009 | K-Town | Interracial Couple #3 | |
| 2012 | Totally Smooth | Sherry | Short |
| 2019 | Steven Universe: The Movie | Amethyst | Voice, television film |
| 2021 | The Witcher: Nightmare of the Wolf | Tomas | Voice |

=== Television ===
| Year | Title | Role | Notes |
|---|---|---|---|
| 2006–2010 | Barney & Friends | Riff | Voice |
| 2013–2019 | Steven Universe | Amethyst, additional voices | Voice, main role |
| 2017–2018 | Mighty Magiswords | Danelda | Voice, 2 episodes |
| 2019–2020 | 101 Dalmatian Street | Dolly Dalmatian | Voice, main role |
| 2019–2020 | Steven Universe Future | Amethyst, additional voices | Voice, main role |
| 2020 | Adventure Time: Distant Lands | Glass Boy | Voice, episode: "Obsidian" |
| 2020 | Craig of the Creek | Michelle Green | Voice, 2 episodes |
| 2021 | Kid Cosmic | Blue Behemoth | Voice, 2 episodes |
| 2021 | Tuca & Bertie | Dottie | Voice, episode: "Planteau" |
| 2021 | American Dad! | New Doctor, Clephanie | Voice, 2 episodes |
| 2021 | Fairfax | Jennifer, Hans Kim | Voice, episode: "Secure the Bag" |
| 2021–2023 | The Owl House | Vee | Voice, 3 episodes |
| 2021–2024 | Monsters at Work | Snore, additional voices | Voice, recurring role |
| 2021–2024 | The Ghost and Molly McGee | Darryl McGee | Voice, recurring role |
| 2022 | Middlemost Post | Ariel, Tilly | Voice, 3 episodes |
| 2022 | Lego Monkie Kid | Scorpion Queen | Voice, episode: "Amnesia Rules" |
| 2022 | Baby Shark's Big Show! | Wallace | Voice, episode: "Welcome Wagon" |
| 2024 | Star Trek: Prodigy | Maj'el | Voice, recurring role (season 2) |
| 2024 | Jentry Chau vs. the Underworld | Tokki | Voice, 3 episodes |
| 2024 | Kiff | Banana | Voice, episode: "Rotten Banana" |
| 2025 | Super Duper Bunny League | Bex | Voice, main role |
| 2025 | Long Story Short | Hannah Schwooper | Voice, recurring role |
| 2026 | The Bad Guys: The Series | Chi-Hoon | Voice, minor role |
| 2026 | Rick and Morty | Stephanie Jergins | Voice, episode: "Rick Fu Hustle" |
| 2026 | Pupstruction | Gigi | Voice, episode: "Tank's Big Little Brother" |

=== Video games ===
| Year | Title | Role | Notes |
|---|---|---|---|
| 2013 | Grand Theft Auto V | Additional voices | |
| 2014 | Cartoon Network Superstar Soccer: Goal | Amethyst | Mobile phone game |
| 2015 | Steven Universe: Attack the Light | Amethyst | Mobile phone game |
| 2015 | Lego Dimensions | Chunk | Level Packs |
| 2017 | Steven Universe: Save the Light | Amethyst | |
| 2019 | Steven Universe: Unleash the Light | Amethyst | |
| 2020 | Fallout 76: Wastelanders | Various voices | DLC |
