= Wispin =

2010 video game

- App icon
- Developer(s): Grumpyface Studios
- Publisher(s): Grumpyface Studios
- Platform(s): iOS
- Release: November 18, 2010
- Genre(s): Action
- Mode(s): Single-player

Wispin is a 2010 action game developed and published by Grumpyface Studios. It was released on November 18, 2010, for iOS.

== Reception ==
Reception

Aggregate score
Aggregator	Score
Metacritic	86/100

Review scores
Publication	Score
Pocket Gamer	3.5/5
TouchArcade	4/5

The game received "generally favorable reviews" according to the review aggregation website Metacritic.

Multiple critics gave positive reviews.
