= Steven Universe: Unleash the Light =

2019 video game

Steven Universe: Unleash The Light
- Image featuring Steven Universe, Garnet, Amethyst, Pearl, Peridot, Pumpkin, Lapis Lazuli, and Bismuth.
- Developer: Grumpyface Studios
- Publisher: Cartoon Network Games
- Writer: Rebecca Sugar
- Series: Steven Universe
- Platforms: iOS; macOS; Nintendo Switch; PlayStation 4; PlayStation 5; Windows; Xbox One; Xbox Series X
- Release: iOS; November 27, 2019 macOS, Windows, PS4, Switch, Xbox One; February 19, 2021
- Genre: Role-playing
- Mode: Single-player

Steven Universe: Unleash the Light is a role-playing video game developed by Grumpyface Studios and published by Cartoon Network Games. It is based on, and taking place after, the Steven Universe animated series. The game is the third and final game in the Light trilogy, after Attack the Light and Save the Light. The storyline was written by Rebecca Sugar and features voices by the show's original cast.

The game was initially only released on iOS via Apple Arcade in November 2019. Just over a year later, in February 2021, the game was simultaneously released on Windows, macOS, Nintendo Switch, PlayStation 4, and Xbox One.

On December 24, 2024, Unleash the Light and other Cartoon Network games were withdrawn from online distribution platforms.

== Plot ==
As Steven is dismantling the Gem Empire, he learns that two Light Prisms have been unaccounted for, and are in the possession of two elite Gems, Demantoid and Pyrope, who refuse to submit to the new order. He and his friends set out to save them with the help of Steven's own Light Prism, who has taken the name George. Along the way, they help the Gems inhabiting Demantoid and Pyrope's colonies, who are uncertain of what to do since they no longer have a purpose.

In the climactic battle, Demantoid and Pyrope force George to fuse with the other two Prisms, creating a giant monster that the team has to fight. However, Steven manages to appeal to the Prisms, enabling them to unfuse. Demantoid and Pyrope, blaming each other for their defeat, fight and knock each other out; afterward, the Crystal Gems decide to stay on the Gem Homeworld for a while to help establish Era 3.

=== v2.0 ===
After reaching Chapter 3, a strange transmission appears in Pyrope's World. While investigating, George reveals the signal's source: Crystal System Colony 215. Returning to the alien plant reveals a new area. When the Gems arrive, they encounter a flustered Peridot, and together they journey into the Kindergarten and encounter the source of the transmission, Squaridot. The angry gem demands Steven deliver the Prism to her, before awkwardly signing out.

Peridot reveals that she let Squaridot out of her bubble, hoping to have her unite with the Crystal Gems. She also tracks Squaridot's location to Hessonite's warship, and the Gems travel there to confront her.

On the warship, power is turned off and Steven and his friends make their way through the locked doors to Squaridot. Finally, they arrive at the ship's controls and fight Squaridot, but it turns out to be a Squaribot decoy. The real Squaridot emerges, controlling the computer, and the team battles her and her army of Squaribots as Peridot hacks the system to shut it down.

After the final battle, Peridot successfully hacks the system and releases Squaridot of her control. However, she has no memory of the events and was only trying to locate Hessonite. Upon activating the ship's emergency protocol, Squaridot was controlled by the program to find the Prism. Squaridot begrudgingly thanks the Gems and is taught about Era 3, while Steven invites her to Beach City.

== Gameplay ==
Unleash The Light is a role-playing video game similar in gameplay to other RPGs including Super Mario RPG or Dragon Quest, with the player leveling up characters through fighting enemies in various areas that act like dungeons. Battling is strategic, with turn-taking and a limited amount of attacks per turn. Each character has their own unique moves, with many of Steven's being support-based, and the other characters' varying based on their in-show personalities and abilities.

The player may only bring four characters with them at a time. Steven Universe himself is always in the party, and the player can choose to add Garnet, Pearl, Amethyst, Lapis Lazuli, Bismuth, Peridot, Connie Maheswaran and Lion, Greg Universe or Hessonite, who are all unlocked throughout different forms of gameplay. During battle, all characters have unique Teamwork attacks between themself and Steven, with some characters having the ability to fuse with him. Unlike in the previous games, players have the option to unlock alternate costumes for the characters, which also include buffs that come with each and can be equipped separately. Similar to previous games, players can collect Badges which can be equipped to any character, along with Charms, a new class of equipment which has many sub-classes, each usable by only a few characters.

The player starts with Steven, Garnet, Amethyst, and Lapis Lazuli, and unlocks Pearl and Bismuth casually through the main story. To unlock Connie and Lion, the player must either visit the fireplace in the Palace of Light after opening two Rainbow Light Key Doors, each requiring three Rainbow Light Keys, or visiting the Palace in general after defeating Demantoid. The only way to get Connie and Lion to appear using the first method is to leave and re-enter the Palace after opening the second door. To unlock Peridot, the player must trace a 'mysterious distress signal' received during the main story back to an earlier stage, and complete part of her side quest.

The Rose's Room game mode features infinitely replayable missions similar to rogue-like games such as The Binding of Isaac, where the map and unlockable abilities are randomly generated each playthrough, but upon either completing a run or failing, the player earns permanent rewards which improves their abilities for future runs. This game mode is the only way to unlock Greg Universe and Hessonite for the main game mode.

== Update history ==
In 2020, the game was updated to v2.0, adding Peridot as a playable character and Smoky Quartz as a fusion. On February 19, 2021, the game was released on Nintendo Switch, PlayStation 4, Xbox One, Steam and PC and updated to v3.0, adding Connie and Lion as playable characters. On June 16, 2022, the game's v4.0 update added Greg Universe and Hessonite as playable characters and the Rose's Room game mode.

== Reception ==
The iOS version of the game was praised by critics. It received 5 stars on TouchArcade, which described it as an "Apple Arcade gem", while Game Informer called it "a diamond in the rough among movie/television-to-videogame adaptions." George Foster of RPGSite commented that while fans of the show will appreciate the game the most, with gameplay that "will be enough on its own" for non-fans and praised the character interactions as having improved since Save The Light. Mike Fahey of Kotaku stated that he appreciated the simplicity of the game, comparing it to Paper Mario in its game mechanics, and saying that it never felt bloated.
