= Steven Universe: Save the Light =

2017 video game

- Developer: Grumpyface Studios (Note: Ported to macOS and Windows by Finite Reflection Studios)
- Publisher: Cartoon Network Games (Note: Published physically by Outright Games)
- Platforms: PlayStation 4; Xbox One; macOS; Windows; Nintendo Switch
- Release: PlayStation 4: WW: October 31, 2017; Xbox One: WW: November 3, 2017; macOS, Windows: WW: August 13, 2018; Nintendo Switch: NA: October 30, 2018; EU: November 3, 2018
- Genres: Action-adventure, role-playing
- Mode: Single-player

Steven Universe: Save the Light is an action-adventure role-playing video game developed by Grumpyface Studios and published by Cartoon Network Games. Based on the television series Steven Universe, it is a sequel to the 2015 mobile game Steven Universe: Attack the Light, and is set before Steven Universe: Unleash the Light. It was released digitally on October 31, 2017 for PlayStation 4, on November 3, 2017 for Xbox One, and on August 13, 2018 for macOS and Windows; and ported on October 30, 2018 for Nintendo Switch.

== Gameplay ==
After the events of Attack the Light!, Steven, the Gems and their friends go on a quest to retrieve the Light Prism when the Homeworld Gem Hessonite (voiced by Christine Baranski) steals it.

Save the Light features seven playable characters from the series, Steven, Garnet, Amethyst, Pearl, Connie, Greg and Peridot, with four characters being equipped to a party at a time. The game has a "blend of real-time and turn-based combat", and more of a focus on exploration and puzzle-solving than its predecessor. Players are able to explore Beach City and surrounding areas, and engage in battles with enemies. During battle, the players' actions, which include attacking and defending, will build up the star meter, which allows the characters to pull off more powerful moves. A new feature allows characters to build up a relationship-based meter during battles and dialogue interactions; when filled, certain characters are able to fuse, such as Steven and Connie into Stevonnie.

== Development and release ==
Grumpyface Studios collaborated on the story with series creator Rebecca Sugar, and cited the increased gameplay complexity compared to Attack the Light! as a reason for the switch to consoles. The game was announced at PAX East in March 2017. A port of the game to PC and Mac, by Finite Reflection Studios, was announced in July 2018, and confirmed to release on Steam in August 2018. The developers later teased another big announcement related to the game, eventually revealed to be a Nintendo Switch port, and a physical release of the game bundled with Capybara Games' OK K.O.! Let's Play Heroes for PlayStation 4, Xbox One, and Switch was released in May 2019 by Outright Games.

On December 24, 2024, Save the Light and other Cartoon Network games were withdrawn from online distribution platforms.

== Reception ==
Reception

Aggregate score
Aggregator	Score
Metacritic	(PS4) 54/100

Review scores
Publication	Score
Destructoid	4.5/10
Game Informer	6.25/10
GameSpot	6/10
Nintendo World Report	7.5/10
Polygon	5/10

Upon release, Save the Light received mostly positive reviews. Polygon and Destructoid both praised the game's art direction, battle system, and connection to the series, but criticized the amount of bugs and glitches found at launch.
