= Steven Universe =

American animated television series

- Genre: Adventure; Science fantasy; Comedy drama; Coming-of-age; Musical
- Created by: Rebecca Sugar
- Showrunner: Rebecca Sugar
- Voices of: Zach Callison; Estelle; Michaela Dietz; Deedee Magno Hall
- Theme music composer: Rebecca Sugar; Aivi & Surasshu
- Opening theme: "We Are the Crystal Gems" by: Zach Callison, Estelle, Michaela Dietz and Deedee Magno Hall
- Ending theme: "Love Like You" by Rebecca Sugar
- Composers: Aivi & Surasshu
- Country of origin: United States
- Original language: English
- No. of seasons: 5
- No. of episodes: 160 (list of episodes)

Production
- Executive producers: Rebecca Sugar; Curtis Lelash; Jennifer Pelphrey; Brian A. Miller; Rob Sorcher
- Producer: Jackie Buscarino
- Editors: Mattaniah Adams; Paul Douglas
- Running time: 11 minutes
- Production company: Cartoon Network Studios

Original release
- Network: Cartoon Network
- Release: November 4, 2013 – January 21, 2019

Related
- Steven Universe: The Movie; Steven Universe Future

Steven Universe is an American animated television series created by Rebecca Sugar for Cartoon Network. It tells the coming-of-age story of a young boy, Steven Universe (Zach Callison), who lives with the Crystal Gems—magical, mineral-based aliens named Garnet (Estelle), Amethyst (Michaela Dietz) and Pearl (Deedee Magno Hall)—in the fictional town of Beach City. Steven, who is half-Gem, has adventures with his friends and helps the Gems protect the world from their own kind. The pilot premiered in May 2013, and the series ran for five seasons, from November 2013 to January 2019. The television film Steven Universe: The Movie was released in September 2019, and an epilogue limited series, Steven Universe Future, ran from December 2019 to March 2020. Books, comics, video games and soundtracks based on the series have also been released.

The themes of the series include love, family and the importance of healthy relationships. Sugar based the lead character on her younger brother Steven, who was an artist for the series. She developed Steven Universe while being a writer and storyboard artist on the animated television series Adventure Time, which she left when her show was greenlit for full production. The series adopted a storyboard-driven approach, where storyboard artists drew scenes, wrote dialogue and shaped the narrative. The design of Beach City and the Crystal Gems reflected Sugar's personal inspirations, such as Delaware beaches and childhood experiences, while incorporating influences from anime, video games and art history. Animation was handled by the South Korean studios Sunmin Image Pictures and Rough Draft Korea, while the music of composers Aivi & Surasshu became an integral part of the show's identity.

The series received critical acclaim for its storytelling, character development and visual design. Critics praised its exploration of complex themes such as identity, relationships and mental health, as well as its prominent LGBTQ representation, which included the character Garnet, a fusion embodying a same-sex relationship, whose component characters made history in the first same-sex wedding in children's animation. The voice acting and music were also lauded, with songs like "Stronger Than You" becoming popular and resonating with its audience. Steven Universe earned numerous accolades, including a GLAAD Media Award for Outstanding Kids & Family Program, becoming the first animated series to win the award, and a Peabody Award for Children's & Youth Programming, both respectively in 2019. It has consistently appeared on "best-of" lists for animation, including being ranked number 99 on BBC's 100 Greatest Television Series of the 21st Century list. Additionally, its influence inspired other creators and fostered a broad fanbase.

== Synopsis ==
Steven Universe is set in the fictional town of Beach City, where the Crystal Gems live in an ancient temple and protect humanity from monsters and other threats. The Gems are ageless, genderless alien warriors who project female humanoid forms from magical gemstones at the core of their being. The Crystal Gems include Garnet, Amethyst, Pearl and Steven—a young, half-human, half-Gem boy who inherited his gemstone from his mother, the Crystal Gems' former leader Rose Quartz. As Steven tries to understand his gradually expanding range of powers, he spends his days accompanying the Gems on their missions, as well as interacting with his father Greg, his best friend Connie, his magical pet lion named Lion, and the other residents of Beach City. He explores the abilities inherited from his mother, which include fusion—the ability of Gems to merge their bodies and abilities to form new, more powerful personalities.

As Steven explores his Gem heritage, he gradually learns that the Crystal Gems are fugitives from a vast interstellar empire ruled by the Gem Homeworld. During their missions, they visit ruins that were once important to Gem culture but have been derelict for millennia, and Steven learns that many of the monsters and artifacts they encounter are Gems who were corrupted by a Gem weapon of mass destruction and can no longer maintain rational, humanoid form. The Gem empire originally intended to sterilize the planet Earth to incubate new Gems, but Rose Quartz led her supporters, the Crystal Gems, in a violent and apparently successful rebellion against this genocidal plan. Midway through the first season of the series, the release of Lapis Lazuli, a Gem trapped on Earth for millennia, puts the Crystal Gems at risk from the Gem empire once more, leading to the arrival of hostile envoys Peridot and Jasper.

Peridot joins forces with the Crystal Gems in the second season to neutralize a buried Gem "geo-weapon" that could destroy the planet. In the third season, Lapis decides to reside on Earth with Peridot, Jasper is defeated and captured, and Steven learns that his mother assassinated Pink Diamond, one of the Gem homeworld's leaders. As he wrestles with his conflicted feelings following this revelation, Pink's counterparts Blue and Yellow Diamond begin to turn their attention back to Earth; the fourth season ends with Steven taken to the Gem homeworld to stand trial for his mother's crimes. After escaping, he discovers in the fifth season that his mother actually was Pink Diamond, who faked her death to assume the identity of Rose Quartz full-time. Steven uses this revelation to persuade the other Diamonds to take responsibility for and fix the damage they have caused.

== Development ==
=== Conception ===
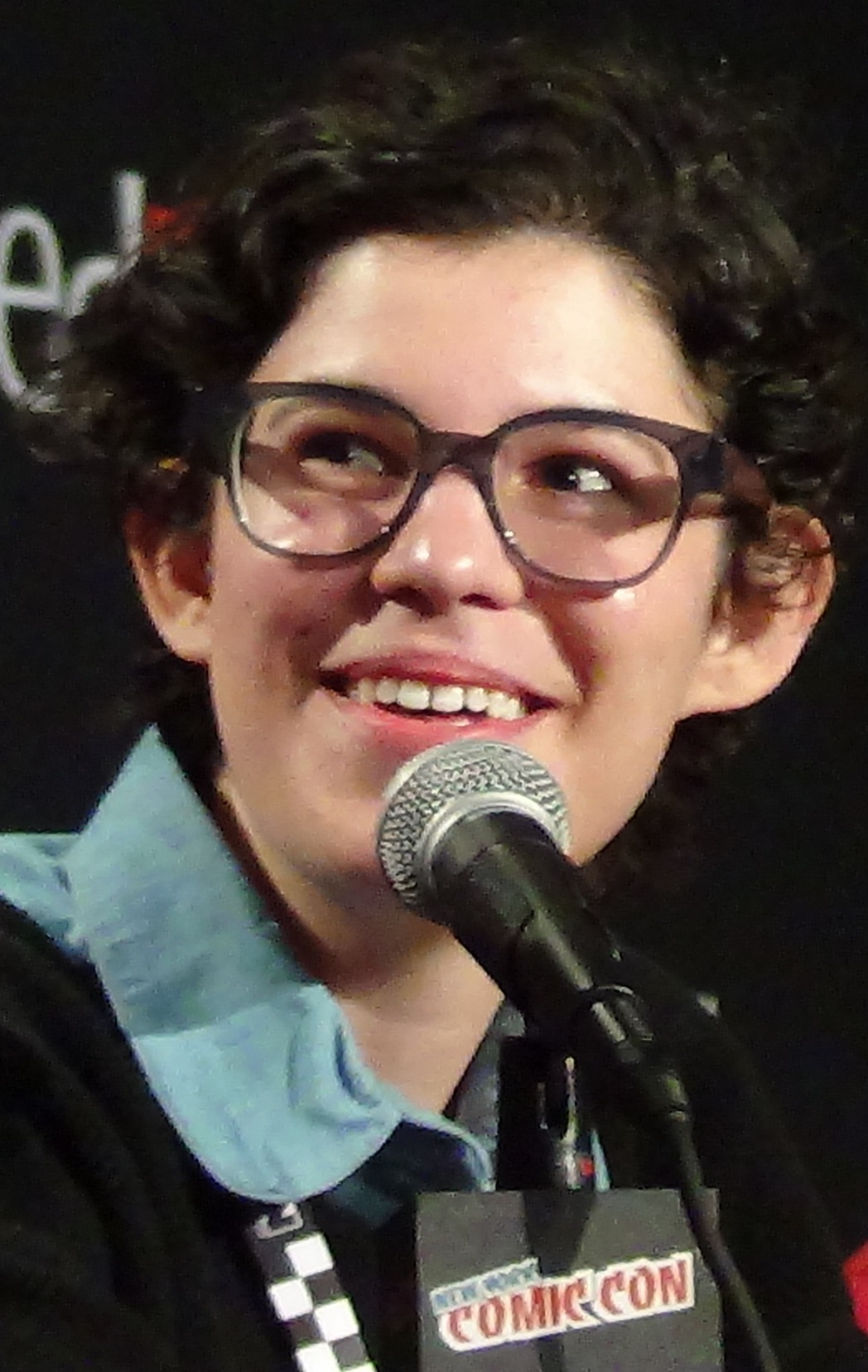
Rebecca Sugar, creator of Steven Universe

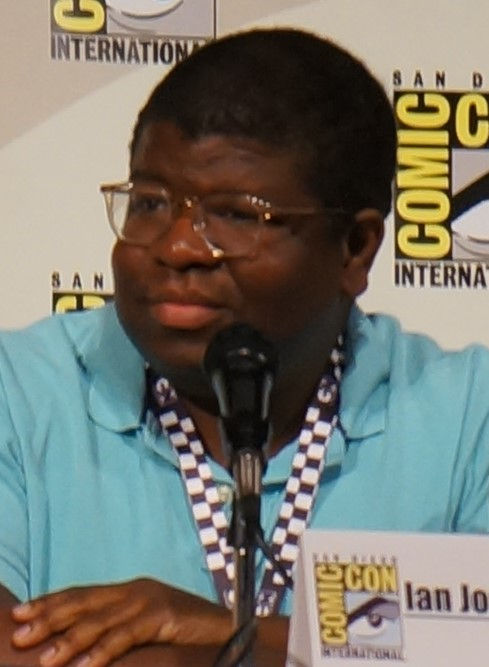
Ian Jones-Quartey, supervising director of Steven Universe

In 2011, after Cartoon Network Vice President of Comedy Animation Curtis Lelash asked the staff for ideas for a new show, Adventure Time storyboard artist Rebecca Sugar described her initial ideas for what would become Steven Universe, and the project was chosen for development. Sugar continued working on Adventure Time while crafting the series. The series evolved from a short story written by Sugar entitled "Ballad of Margo and Dread", about a sensitive child helping teenagers with problems they cannot verbalize. The title character Steven is loosely based on Steven Sugar, Rebecca's younger brother. During Steven Universe's development, Sugar repeatedly asked her brother whether naming the show after him was a good idea; she stopped asking when it was commissioned. Her brother had no problem with it and trusted Sugar to use his name wisely. In an interview with The New York Times, Sugar discussed developing the background of the show's protagonist, saying she wanted to base the character's viewpoint on her brother growing up "where you're so comfortable in your life because you get all the attention, but you also want to rise up and not be the little brother".

To prepare for the potential greenlighting of the show, Sugar began assembling a production crew. Jackie Buscarino was brought in as a producer in September 2012 and was tasked with hiring people and supervising the show's crew. During this period of development, Sugar and her team were moved to a building behind the main Cartoon Network studio and based on the same floor as the crew of The Powerpuff Girls CGI special. Some artists who had worked on the special, such as colorist Tiffany Ford and art directors Kevin Dart, Ellie Michalka and Jasmin Lai, were later invited to join the Steven Universe team. Cartoon Network also provided Sugar with a list of suggested writers; when she saw Ben Levin and Matt Burnett (former writers for Level Up) on the list she immediately asked them to join her team because she was familiar with their work. Freelance artist Danny Hynes, whom the supervising director Ian Jones-Quartey knew from his own project Lakewood Plaza Turbo, became the show's lead character designer. Steven Sugar was assigned as the background designer after his work on the original pilot, and was assisted by Dart, Michalka, Lai, background painter Amanda Winterston and others.

During the art presentation, Jones-Quartey, Guy, Hynes and Steven Sugar created artwork that differed from their previous work. Jones-Quartey wanted to work with something new, retaining elements of the show's previous project. He worked with Elle Michalka, who later took over his role as background painter for the presentation, to create concept art for an "action-comedy" series. Around this time, Jones-Quartey added stars to the series' logo because he saw them as a versatile symbol. He later said he overused them, and they were criticized for doing so. The art presentation's drawings were by Rebecca Sugar, Jones-Quartey, Hynes, Paul Villeco (a writer and storyboard artist) and Steven Sugar. Michalka did the painting. Cartoon Network executives commissioned the show after the crew's art presentation, and Sugar became the first non-binary person to create a show independently for the network. Prior to coming out as non-binary, she was described as the first woman to do so. Before a production team had been appointed, Sugar tried to alter elements of the show's plot and developed the character's identity so her crew would have the creative freedom to implement their own ideas, like she did when she worked for Adventure Time.

When Sugar's show was commissioned, she resigned from Adventure Time to focus on her own series. Sugar centered the pilot short on the main characters and their personalities to demonstrate the series' humor. The pilot is a slice-of-life episode that does not involve major events because the series' world was still in development. Sugar and her production team focused the plot on interaction between the Crystal Gems and Steven. Sugar strove to make her pilot distinctive in terms of its artistic and aesthetic detail but was hampered by the time limit imposed upon her by Cartoon Network. The problems with the pilot helped Sugar develop the show's concept; she said, "to know that there is so much more that you can't see and the way that knowledge frustrates and excites and confuses and scares you". When the pilot was presented to Cartoon Network executives, they told the crew the series would air in 2013. Cartoon Network released the original pilot in May 2013. Sugar and her team panicked because the series was going to be very different from the pilot episode. The pilot was popular when it was released, engendering forum discussions in which people expressed their hopes of seeing it on the air soon. Those who knew Rebecca Sugar from Adventure Time were also interested. Positive reaction to the show reassured its crew that the series could be much greater.

=== Design ===
During the development of the Steven Universe pilot, Sugar focused much attention on the design of the world, adding notes to her drawings. Inspired by the idea of foreign figures (Gems) living human lives, she drew many sketches depicting their world and history. The series' design was also inspired by her and her brother's interest in video games, comics and animation. After the series was commissioned, Sugar decided to redesign everything to make the series "flexible and simple" for future production staff to add ideas of their own. During this time, the art director was Kevin Dart, followed by Jasmin Lai, Elle Michalka, and Ricky Cometa. Dart's artistic style remained a great influence on the show long after his departure. Steven Sugar was inspired by Dart in his college years and praised his work, saying Dart had more ideas for the art than he did.

In the pilot, only two locations appeared: the ancient Temple that is the Gems' home, and the Big Donut, a nearby doughnut shop. The Temple was designed by Jones-Quartey, Steven Sugar, Ben Levin, Matt Burnett, Tom Herpich and Andy Ristaino. The Temple's dual faces were based on Guy Davis' ideas. Steven Sugar designed the rest of Beach City for the series; he was painstaking in his attention to detail, e.g. carefully considering the interior layouts of buildings. Sugar also designed people, houses, cars, buildings and restaurants. Because of Rebecca Sugar's redesigned drawings, the two original locations had to be redrawn.

To find inspiration for the show's backgrounds, the Sugars and Jones-Quartey went to their favorite beaches. The series' setting, Beach City, is loosely based on Delaware beaches Rehoboth Beach, Bethany Beach and Dewey Beach, all of which Rebecca Sugar visited as a child. Steven Sugar drew Beach City with a boardwalk lined with a variety of shops. He wanted it to have a "specific style" so viewers could believe it was based on a real location; he drew the roads and shops consistently oriented with the Temple and a water tower. The concept for the primary setting was inspired by Akira Toriyama's manga Dr. Slump, which features a small environment in which the recurring characters live where they work. Steven Sugar made the boardwalk the focus of Steven Universe's human world.

=== Characters ===
During the early stages of production, Rebecca Sugar worked on character appearances and personality development simultaneously; during this process of conception, she was heavily inspired by fantasy television characters she and her brother used to draw when they were younger. Lead character designer Danny Hynes, influenced by the design of Mickey Mouse by Disney artists, wanted the characters to be standardized, simple and recognizable. He proposed 24 human characters to the crew; Rebecca and Steven Sugar drew 22 designs—13 of which were made official. The coloring was done by Jones-Quartey. Rebecca Sugar merged several characters during the pilot's development; supporting characters Lars and Sadie were originally created when she was in college. The family that runs Beach City's pizza shop was based on Jones-Quartey's Ghanaian family, and the character Ronaldo was created by Ben Levin and Matt Burnett. Guy Davis, a childhood friend of the Sugars, designed the early monsters and Gem architecture.

According to Jones-Quartey, making a character "look alive" was always a priority in their design, and a character's emotions should be clearly delineated. The character design team's mission was for the characters to resemble those of older animation, such as 1940s Disney cartoons, Dragon Ball Z or the works of Osamu Tezuka and Harvey Kurtzman. In drawing the characters for each episode, the crew had two weeks to make modifications. Character names and some designs were inspired by types of food, and some characters were redesigned because the pilot revealed discrepancies between appearances and personalities. Sugar planned for the characters' designs to receive visual benchmarks so the show's artists could draw them consistently. Sugar aimed to make the designs for her characters simple, flexible and consistent so the production team members would not become bogged down by overly complex details. This redesigning meant the appearances of the characters in the pilot episode differ substantially from their depiction in the television series.

Sugar wanted the Crystal Gems to resemble humans; she developed them to navigate the complexities of family life with Steven, whom they would treat like a brother. She wanted their gems to reflect their personalities; Pearl's perfect smoothness, Amethyst's coarseness and Garnet's air of mystery. According to Sugar, the Gems were made as "non-binary women" in order to express herself as a non-binary woman through them. Their facial designs were influenced by Wassily Kandinsky, who taught at the Bauhaus and encouraged his students to pair three primary colors—red, yellow and blue—with the three basic shapes—square, triangle and circle. Because of the characters' personalities, Garnet is square, Amethyst is a sphere and Pearl is a cone. Sugar wanted to give the Gems a surrealistic power similar to those of classic cartoon characters such as Bugs Bunny. The Gems' ability to shape-shift is a reference to older cartoons such as Tex Avery's work for MGM, where characters would change size and shape at will. Although the Gems are intended to be serious characters, the writers wanted them to be "funny and weird" as well.

=== Themes ===
Sugar wanted Steven Universe to be thematically consistent with her and her brother's shared interests. As a coming-of-age series, the theme of family within the show is important since Sugar based the titular character on her brother. Additionally, the theme of love was inspired by her relationship with Jones-Quartey. The series also expresses the importance of acceptance, and explores relationships, LGBTQ identity, diversity in body shapes and sizes, and "hues of skin in a colorful sci-fi magic display of diversity", as quoted by Sugar. Supervising director Kat Morris stated that the series' central concepts were developed over time in an organic way, rather than being "overly calculated" from the start. Burnett said the series' simple-life theme prevented the inclusion of "cynicism" or "snarkiness", and expressed the writers had no interest in a superhero theme.

The unusually strong female presence in a series with a male lead—all major characters except Steven and Greg are female—was intentional according to Sugar. She aimed to challenge and explore the portrayal of gender in children's cartoons, calling it "absurd" that television shows for boys should be fundamentally different from those for girls. She developed the series' plot towards a distant goal, with everything in between kept flexible, partly because her intentions had "changed since I've started because I've grown up a lot" while working on the show. Sugar described the series as "reverse escapism": the idea that fantasy characters would become interested in real life and would want to participate in it. Steven personifies the "love affair between fantasy and reality". Sugar said Steven Universe was influenced by The Simpsons and anime series Future Boy Conan and Revolutionary Girl Utena.

==== LGBTQ representation ====
Pearl (left) and Steven's mother, Rose Quartz, embrace in a flashback shot edited out of the British broadcast. Their past relationship is gradually seen to affect Pearl's relationship with Steven and those around him.

During a 2016 Comic-Con panel, Sugar said the LGBTQ themes in Steven Universe were largely based on her own experience as a bisexual woman. For her to challenge gender norms as an analogy for the intimidating unknowns that come with a first love, characters like Stevonnie (a they/them fusion between Steven and Connie debuted in episode "Alone Together") and Fluorite (a fusion of six Gems debuted in episode "Off Colors" who represents a polyamorous relationship) were introduced in the series. She stated the LGBTQ themes are not intended to make a point but to help children understand themselves and develop their identities. In her opinion, queer youth deserve to see themselves in stories as much as other children—and, given pervasive heteronormativity, not allowing them to do so can be harmful.

The censorship of LGBTQ themes in the series generated controversy in 2016 when Cartoon Network UK removed an embrace between Rose and Pearl but did not remove a kiss between Rose and Greg from its British broadcast. The network, which said the decision was intended to make the episode "more comfortable for local kids and their parents", was criticized as homophobic by fans and the media. In 2017, the Kenya Film Classification Board banned Steven Universe and other cartoon series from being broadcast for "glorifying homosexual behavior".

Sugar stated she had been determined to make queer relationships integral to the story in ways that are "impossible to censor," and had to fight internally for the representation. Obstacles from Cartoon Network executives included requests to make Ruby a boy, to have the characters never kiss on the mouth, and for there to be no romantic relationship between Ruby and Sapphire. They issued a warning regarding the possibility of cancelation if anyone on the crew, including Sugar, gave confirmation one of the characters were homosexual. Sugar said that when she began to talk publicly about the need of creative control of her show to tell these stories, she garnered support from the fandom and the LGBTQ organization GLAAD.

In June 2021, Sugar said that "[b]eing at the forefront [of LGBTQ representation] meant that there was very little queer content beyond what we were creating". She also said that apart from threats and backlash from homophobic viewers, she feared that her identity and content in the show could lead to its cancelation if she spoke about it openly, noting that support for the show was "often very qualified and hurtful". She also noted that non-binary creators such as herself have additional challenges, going through a world where non-binary people are dehumanized, and hoped that "visible queer content and multiple queer creators means no one has to feel isolated" in the ways that she did. The same month, Sugar told NPR that she wanted "little boys to experience girl show things" and vice versa, and for "nonbinary, gender-expansive kids to have a show".

== Production ==
=== Writing ===
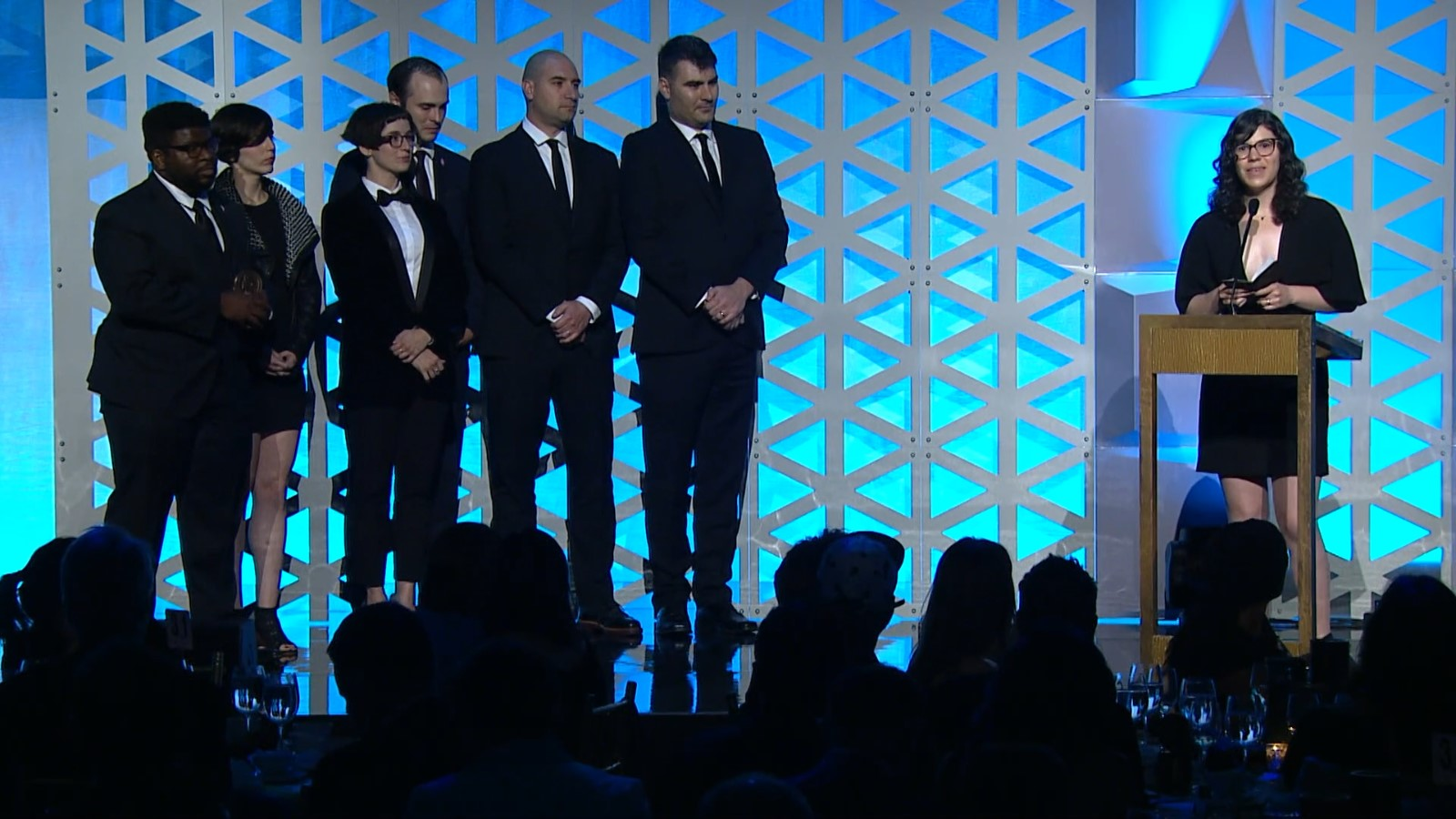
The crew of Steven Universe at the 78th Annual Peabody Awards in 2019, accepting the Children's & Youth Programming award. (From left to right: Ian Jones-Quartey, Kat Morris, Hilary Florido, Joe Johnston, Ben Levin, Matt Burnett and Rebecca Sugar)

During the pilot's development, Sugar wrote and sketched a number of plot ideas that later became episodes. The series' initial premise focused mostly on Steven's human side, rather than his Gem side, but the premise was later changed. Sugar developed the Gems' history in conjunction with the pilot episode. While the first season of the show introduced the human and Gem characters and their relationships, Sugar began to plot and explore second-season storylines involving the Crystal Gems. To make it easier, Sugar created a chart with taped printouts about a 2,000-year Gem and Earth history, with a number of events needing to be elaborated for production. Although the series' overall plot was established, the writers improvised to arrive at its ending; according to Matt Burnett, the storylines would be resolved by the series' end. Sugar wanted the series to focus on comedy and positivity before exploring controversial subjects involving the main characters, thinking it was "more honest" to begin the show with happiness instead of action or drama.

Writers Levin and Burnett would script the premises and outlines while the storyboarders wrote and drew the episodes. Everyone would wait at least a day to get together and discuss. They wrote potential episode names on paper cards and pinned them to the conference room wall, using this display to review their work and plan meetings. They discussed episode pacing and varied each season's texture by balancing casual and dramatic story arcs. Changes in major-character appearances—such as Yellow Diamond—in a storyline could be difficult for the writers. According to Levin, drafting a season of Steven Universe was like a "jigsaw puzzle" because the writing team must assemble a number of plot ideas, which were discarded if they did not benefit character growth. After further discussion and questions about what they came up with, an idea would become an episode. After discussing a season's proposed episodes, the "puzzle" was complete, and they began drafting a major story arc or a season finale. Burnett said formulating a season was like an algebraic equation "where one side is the season finale, and the x's and y's are the episodes we need for that solution to make sense"; he cited "Ocean Gem", "Steven the Sword Fighter", "Monster Buddies", "An Indirect Kiss" and "Serious Steven" as examples. Those episodes led to the season one finale as a minor story arc. To develop new ideas for episodes, the writers played brainstorming games. In one, a scenario with characters was drawn and passed to a colleague. Each participant would add a few sentences before passing it along, continuing until the drawing evolved into a three-act story. Episodes such as "Island Adventure", "Future Boy Zoltron" and "Onion Friend" were crafted this way. The writers also played drawing games, which designed new Gem characters and technological ideas. Burnett said he and Levin used fewer ideas from the storyboarders than they previously did; storyboarders changed fewer things than they did before because the episodes had a "stronger continuity".

According to Levin, he and Burnett tried to balance the focus between the main characters—with Steven in the center—and the theme of the episodes in their writing. The balance indicated Steven had the same interests on his human side as he did on his Gem side. Levin said early development of Steven was crucial to the Gem mythology and drama. Grateful to work on a show which was unafraid to be "sincere and vulnerable", he said if every episode was emotional, the series would become formulaic; lighthearted episodes balance out emotional ones. Levin said he and Burnett found ways to integrate Steven's powers into the plot. The character's powers and home-world technology are revealed at a "measured (very slow) pace", satisfying the viewer and steering the series clear of superhero territory. Before significant plotlines aired, the writers revealed information relevant to a "climactic" episode for the audience. According to storyboard artist Hilary Florido, much of the series' action and magic are narrative climaxes, demonstrating the characters' discoveries, difficulties and views. Florido said if a character's evolution is not directly related to the plot, there is no drama. The crew was discouraged from breaking perspective involving episode development, as they wanted the audience to know the protagonist's point of view. Although the writers could hint at future events, they preferred to focus on plot and develop Steven in real time. Levin said if the pilot tried to present Gem history in five minutes, the audience and protagonist would be equally confused.

=== Storyboarding ===
Portion of the storyboard and script from the episode "Island Adventure". The series' storyboard artists are also its writers.

During storyboard meetings, artists drew their ideas on post-it notes, which are then attached to walls, tables and boxes in the corners of their conference room. The drawings played a major role in forming episode ideas; Sugar looked at these designs and occasionally made changes to key poses. Sugar liked to review and re-draw scenes and characters to add extra pathos and emotion to storyboards. Each episode's storyboards were created by two artists, each of whom wrote half of the dialogue and drew panels similar to comic strips. This process could be quite complex; the storyboard artists would have to create the cinematography and focus on scenic design in a way similar to film production. After the panels were made, the thumbnail-storyboard artists drew mannerisms and wrote dialogue based on their own experiences; Sugar drew "quintessential" scenes from her memories of hanging out with her brother after school. The storyboard artists then discussed their work with the rest of the crew and make any necessary changes. After the team discussion, the storyboard artists drew a revised board—based on the thumbnail board—on a full-size panel with notes. The storyboards were again discussed, corrected and finally approved. Although Sugar worked as executive producer on the series' art, animation and sound, she considered herself "the most hands on" at the storyboarding stage.

=== Backgrounds ===
The production of background art would begin after the approved storyboards were received. If the characters visited old locations, the pre-existing backgrounds would be modified for authenticity; locations would likely change slightly over time. Steven Sugar liked to hide narrative bits in the backgrounds, believing the key to worldbuilding is "having a cohesive underlying structure to everything". Art director Elle Michalka said the backgrounds' artistic style was inspired by French post-impressionist painter Paul Cézanne, whose apparent lack of focus belied detail and specificity. The art was also inspired by Tao Te Ching, whose work highlights the importance of empty spaces, "like the space within a vase as being part of the vase that makes it useful". During the painting phase, the painters saw the lines as "descriptive bones" and color is used loosely, meaning the color is intentionally slightly off register, highlighting the distinction between color and line. The painters used "superimposed" watercolor texture before switching to Photoshop because the former made the backgrounds "very chunky". When painting the backgrounds, they used one primary color and several secondary colors; Amanda Winterston and Jasmin Lai found suitable color combinations. After the primary backgrounds were painted, they were sent to the color stylist, who chose colors for a character or prop from model sheets, matching and complementing the storyboard and background. The lines of the character or prop were rarely colored. The lines were removed when scene needed light effects. The coloring in early season one episodes was experimental because the stylist would have difficulty if a storyboard's character and background mixed together or a bright character walked unchanged into a shadow. Mistakes became rare as the crew planned and checked storyboards. The primary backgrounds were made in Burbank; the secondary ones were made by Korean artists.

=== Animation ===
After the crew finished constructing an episode, the production team sent it to animators in South Korea. The series was animated at Sunmin Image Pictures and Rough Draft Korea. The production team and animators communicated via email and sometimes video called when animating a major episode. Before sending the episode to one of the studios, animation director Nick DeMayo and his team created a plan for the animators after reviewing the animatics. They then added character movements on exposure sheets to guide the animators. Mouth assignments for the characters, describing mouth shapes and timing for lip-syncing, followed. The episode would then be sent to one of the animation studios. The black-and-white version was sent first, followed about two weeks later by the colored version. The animation was drawn and inked on paper, then scanned and colored digitally. Afterward, the crew would have a "work print" meeting to discuss the episode and review it for errors. DeMayo found errors, removed them and sent the episode back to the animation studio or to Cartoon Network's post-production department to fix any remaining issues. Minor animation mistakes or omissions were fixed by the crew.

=== Voice cast ===
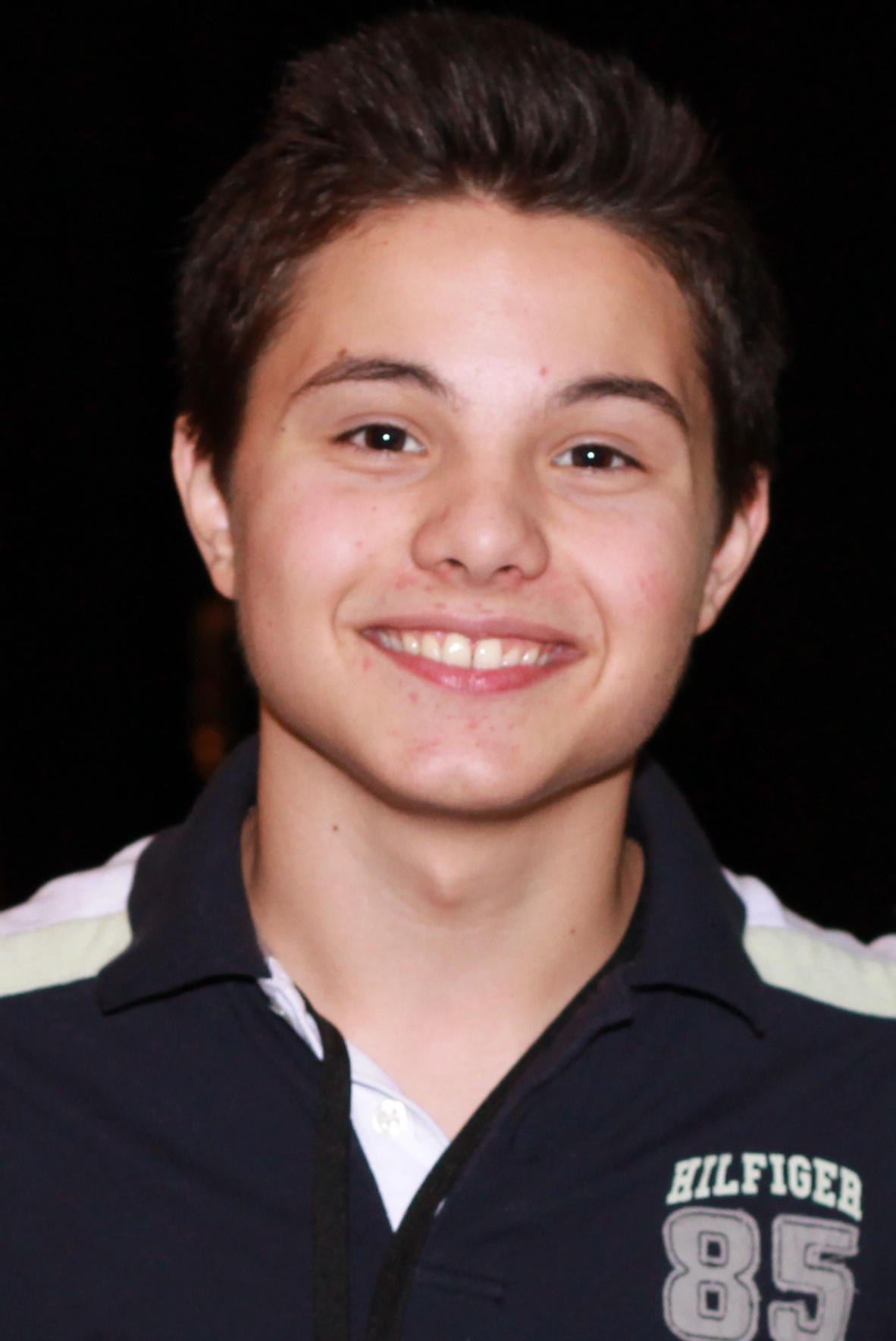
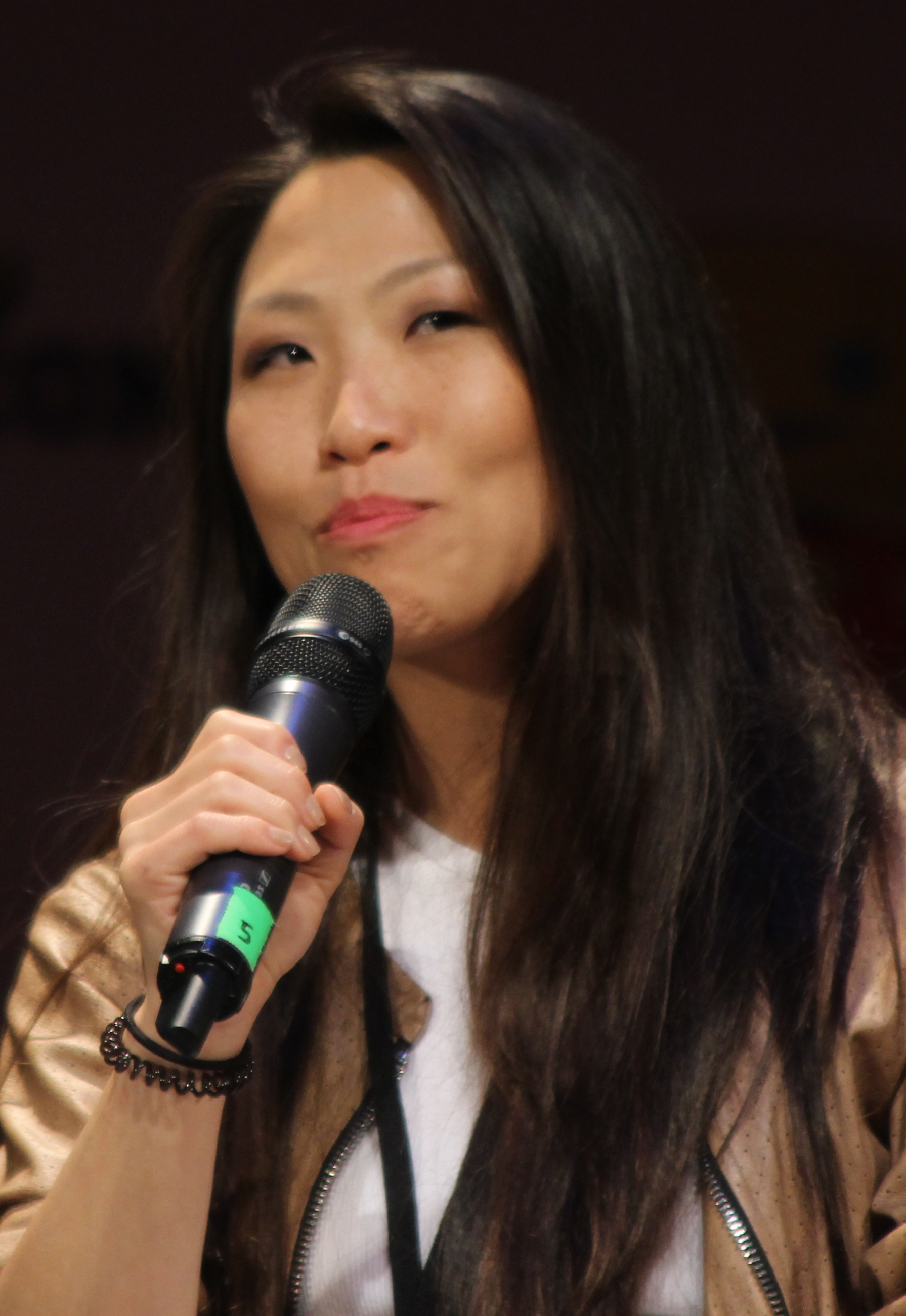
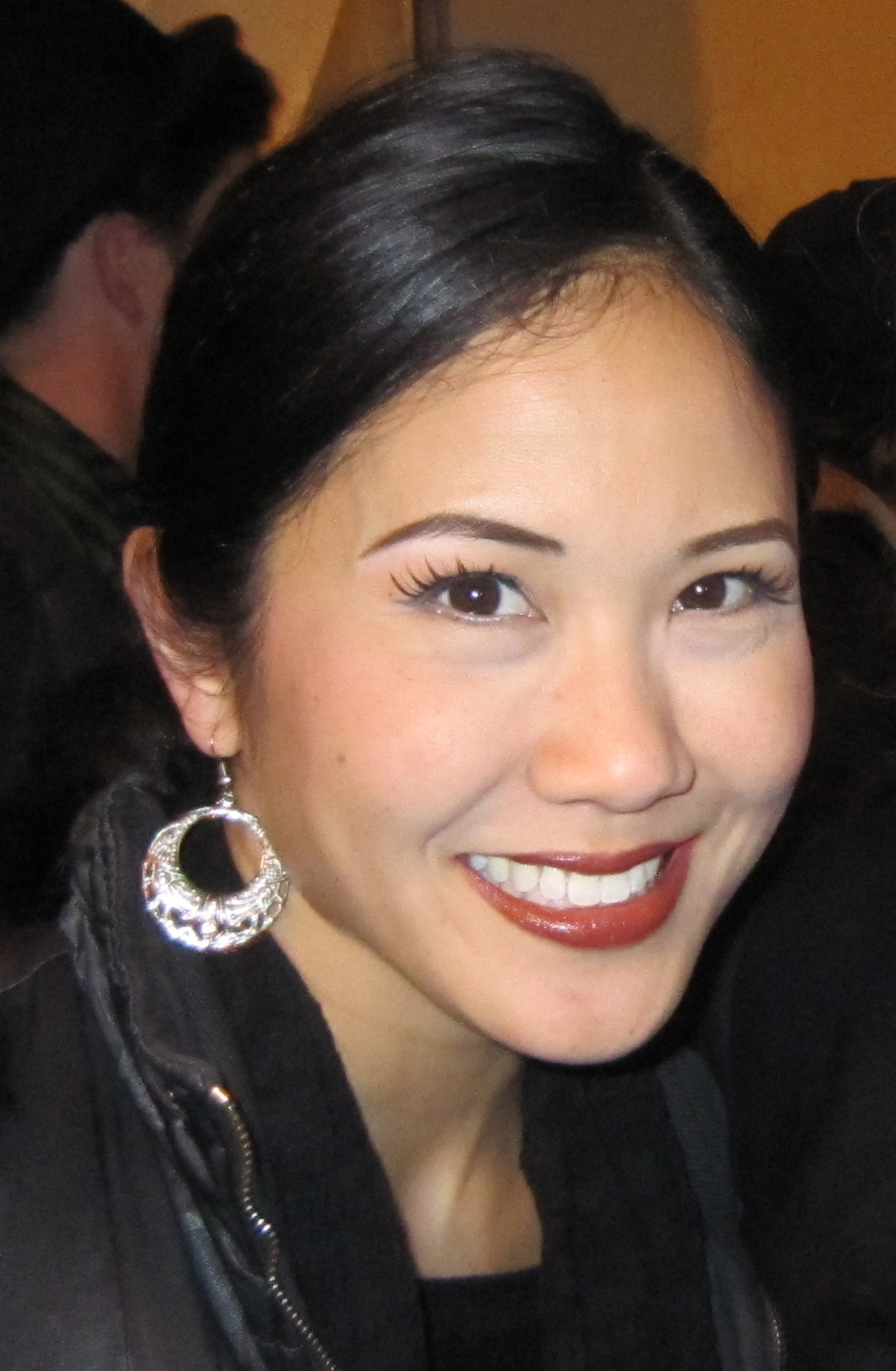
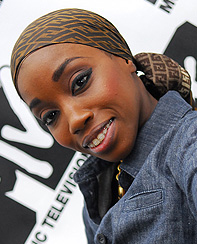
The main voice cast (clockwise from top left): Zach Callison (Steven), Michaela Dietz (Amethyst), Estelle (Garnet) and Deedee Magno Hall (Pearl)

American actor Zach Callison voiced Steven. The role of Steven was his first lead role on television. For his audition, Callison spoke ten lines of dialogue from the pilot and sang the theme song. Garnet, the Crystal Gem leader, was voiced by Estelle, a singer, songwriter and actor. Cartoon Network asked Estelle to take the part, her first voice-acting role. Steven Universe was also the first animation voice role for actor Michaela Dietz, who voices Amethyst and The Party singer Deedee Magno Hall, who voices Pearl. Sugar wanted Tom Scharpling, whom she knew from his podcast The Best Show with Tom Scharpling, to voice a character for one of her projects before Steven Universe was conceived. She approached Scharpling for the part of Greg Universe, who was originally named Tom. The Ruby Gems are voiced by Lo Mutuc, to whom Sugar wrote to say she was confident Mutuc would be perfect for the role. Grace Rolek, who voices Steven's friend Connie, was 16 years old when the series began; Rolek has been a voice actor in animated productions since the age of five or six.

The show's four main voice actors—Callison, Dietz, Magno Hall and Estelle—spent three to four hours recording per session; three to four weeks a month for ten months each year. Cast members could be recorded together or separately; they would often record multiple episodes within a single recording period. However, each individual session primarily focused on one episode at a time, allowing for retakes specific to that episode or previous ones if needed. In group recording sessions, a maximum of six actors stood in a semicircle. Sugar and voice director Kent Osborne attended the sessions, advising the actors about voicing the characters in specific situations. If they liked a take, the production assistant marked it and gave it to the animation editor for the episode's rough cut. When a recording session began, Sugar explained the storyboards and described the sequences, character intention and the relationship between them; Osborne did the recording. Before the sessions, Sugar and the voice actors discussed new plot elements and showed them the advanced storyboards. Magno Hall said she enjoyed the group recording sessions because the funny faces the cast members made while recording lines requiring emotion or movement often caused them to laugh.

=== Music ===
An orchestral rendition of "We Are the Crystal Gems" in MultiVersus.

Steven Universe features songs and musical numbers produced by Sugar and her writers, who collaborated on the lyrics. Multiple drafts of the theme song's lyrics were written. Sugar composed the extended theme song while waiting in line for a security check at Los Angeles International Airport. The series relies on leitmotifs for its soundtrack; instruments, genres and melodies are allotted to specific characters. The music was influenced by the works of Michael Jackson and Estelle, with Sugar also citing Aimee Mann as "a huge influence". Sugar wrote songs for the series during her travels, accompanying herself on a ukulele. Not every episode features a song; according to Sugar, she used them occasionally, to avoid forced creativity.

Most of the show's incidental music was composed by the chiptune piano duo Aivi & Surasshu, with guitars by Stemage. Jeff Liu, who was familiar with producer Aivi's musical score for the video game Cryamore, recommended them to Sugar as a composer. Sugar asked Aivi to audition and agreed that producer Surasshu could join them. Aivi & Surasshu scored a clip from "Gem Glow", the series' first episode; Sugar liked their work and hired them as series composers. Before composing an episode, Aivi & Surasshu video called with Sugar and the creative director to discuss the episode; they had a week to send Sugar a preview score. After any necessary changes, Aivi & Surasshu sent the score to Sabre Media Studios for the final mix with their sound designs.

Each character has a leitmotif expressing their personality, which changes slightly depending on the situation. Pearl is often accompanied by a piano, Garnet by a synth bass, Amethyst by a drum machine with electric bass and synths, and Steven with chiptune tones. Sound palettes were produced for the human characters to represent the evolution of the series, its characters and their relationships. Sound motifs and palettes were also created for locations, objects and abstract concepts. When Sugar or the other writers drafted a song for an episode, they would record a demo that was sent to the composers. The same musical style for a song and the character singing appeared for each song. Over time, the songs had become increasingly complex and production has become more difficult because the show's original musical style no longer fit perfectly with the newer lyrical themes. An example is "Here Comes a Thought", sung by Estelle and AJ Michalka (who voices Stevonnie). The two were less inspired by a specific musical style, but rather by the song's "feel", which Sugar had explained to them.

== Broadcast ==
=== Episodes ===
Season	Episodes	Originally released	
Season	Episodes	First released	Last released
Pilot		May 21, 2013	
1	53	November 4, 2013	March 12, 2015
2	25	March 13, 2015	January 8, 2016
3	25	May 12, 2016	August 10, 2016
4	25	August 11, 2016	May 11, 2017
5	32	May 29, 2017	January 21, 2019
Film		September 2, 2019	
Future	20	December 7, 2019	March 27, 2020

The pilot episode of Steven Universe was released on Cartoon Network's video platform on May 21, 2013, and an edited version was released on July 20. The pilot was shown at the 2013 San Diego Comic-Con in July of that year, and Sugar hosted a 30-minute panel discussion about the series at the 2013 New York Comic Con on October 13. Initially, 13 episodes were ordered for the first season; on November 14, the season was picked up for double the amount. The series was renewed for a second season on July 25, 2014, which began airing on March 13, 2015, and for a third season in July 2015. In March 2016, Cartoon Network issued its last renewal to the series for an additional two seasons.

The series premiered in the United States on November 4, 2013, on Cartoon Network with two episodes. In Canada, it began airing on Cartoon Network on November 11, 2013, and on Teletoon on April 24, 2014. It began airing on Cartoon Network channels in Australia on February 3, 2014, and in the United Kingdom and Ireland on May 12 of that year.

Beginning in 2015, Cartoon Network often aired new episodes in groups of five over one week—marketed as "Stevenbombs"—rather than one episode per week. The hiatuses between groups have irritated fans according to The A.V. Club, causing "agonized cries of a rabid, starving, pained cult following". The format, which is also used for other Cartoon Network series, has, in the website's view, contributed to the network's spikes in Google Trends associated with each "bomb". The A.V. Club attributed the effect to Steven Universe's unusual—for a youth cartoon—adherence to an overarching plot, which can generate "massive swells of online interest"—similar to the release of full seasons of adult TV series—which are "crucial to a network's vitality in an increasingly internet-based television world".

In May 2018, Cartoon Network apologized to fans after one of the channel's promotional videos contained unaired footage with significant spoilers for future episodes. In response to the video, Jones-Quartey noted in a later-deleted tweet that "being a Steven Universe fan is suffering", alluding to the series' irregular and unpredictable airing schedule. In an October 2020 art book for the series, Sugar stated that when clips from unaired episodes, giving away major spoilers, were leaked or those clips were used in official promotional videos, it was "very demoralizing for the crew".

=== Crossovers ===
"Say Uncle" is a crossover episode with Uncle Grandpa that aired on April 2, 2015. In the episode, Uncle Grandpa helps Steven use his Gem powers when he cannot summon his shield. The episode contains an acknowledgement by Uncle Grandpa that the episode is not canonical. Steven, Garnet, Amethyst, Pearl and other Cartoon Network characters from current and former shows made cameo appearances in the Uncle Grandpa episode "Pizza Eve". Additionally, Garnet appeared in "Crossover Nexus", an episode of OK K.O.! Let's Be Heroes, which aired on October 8, 2018. In the episode, Garnet teams up with K.O., Ben Tennyson from Ben 10 and Raven from Teen Titans Go! to stop the villain Strike.

=== Minisodes ===
Two volumes of mini-episodes have been released by Cartoon Network. The first one includes the extended title theme "We Are the Crystal Gems"; shorts in which the Crystal Gems teach Steven about Gems in a classroom setting; an unboxing video of Steven's new duffel bag; and a short in which Steven's pet lion is playing with a cardboard box. The second volume contains five minisodes that show Steven cooking, performing karaoke, reacting to an episode of his favorite cartoon, video calling with Lapis and Peridot, and playing a new song. In 2018, Sugar collaborated with Dove to create six shorts addressing self-esteem issues, and two years later, created four shorts promoting anti-racism.

=== Cancellation and sequels ===
According to Rebecca Sugar, she was notified in 2016 that the series would be canceled at the end of the fifth season. She prevailed upon Cartoon Network to extend the fifth season to 32 episodes, in order to have room to complete the story, as well as a follow-up television film, Steven Universe: The Movie (2019). Along with the film, Cartoon Network also greenlit an additional season of 20 episodes, which would become the sequel miniseries Steven Universe Future (2020), taking place after the events of the film. Despite the show's end, Sugar has indicated that more stories could exist, but has stated that she needs a long break before deciding how to approach such a continuation. In June 2025, a spin-off titled Lars of the Stars was announced to be in development for Amazon Prime Video.

== Other media ==
=== Books ===
A number of companion books have been published:

- Steven Universe's Guide to the Crystal Gems (October 2015, ISBN 978-0-8431-8316-0) by series creator Rebecca Sugar, with information about the Crystal Gems.
- Quest for Gem Magic (October 2015, ISBN 978-0-8431-8317-7) by Max Brallier is a "colorful journal and activity book" for 8- to 12-year-olds.
- Steven Universe Mad Libs (October 2015, ISBN 978-0-8431-8309-2) by Walter Burns is a Mad Libs word-game book.
- Steven Universe: Live from Beach City (February 2016, ISBN 978-0-8431-8349-8) is a music and activity book with chord charts and sheet music for the first season's major songs.
- What in the Universe? (February 2016, ISBN 978-0-8431-8348-1) by Jake Black is a collection of trivia about Steven and the Gems.
- Best Buds Together Fun (June 2016, ISBN 978-1-101-99516-7) by Jake Black is a "quiz and activity book" for at 8- to 12-year-olds.
- The Answer (September 2016, ISBN 978-0-399-54170-4) by Rebecca Sugar is a children's-book adaptation of the episode, "The Answer". It was seventh on the New York Times best-seller list on October 2, 2016.
- The Tale of Steven (October 2019, ISBN 978-1-4197-4148-7) by Rebecca Sugar is a children's book companion to the episode "Change Your Mind". Inspired by Sugar's experience of coming out, it retells Pink Diamond's decision to become Rose Quartz and to create Steven from the perspectives of White Diamond, Rose and Steven himself, each readable by rotating the pages of the book in different directions.

Nonfiction books covering the development of the franchise and compiling production artwork have also been published:

- Steven Universe: Art and Origins (July 2017, Abrams Books, ISBN 978-1-4197-2443-5) by Chris McDonnell, with an introduction by Dexter's Laboratory creator Genndy Tartakovsky and a foreword by Rebecca Sugar. The book contains concept art, production samples, early sketches, storyboards and commentary by the Steven Universe production crew.
- The Art of Steven Universe The Movie (March 2020, Dark Horse, ISBN 978-1-5067-1507-0) by Ryan Sands, which contains preliminary character designs and storyboards.
- Steven Universe: End of an Era (October 2020, Abrams Books, ISBN 978-1-4197-4284-2) by Chris McDonnell, with a foreword by N. K. Jemisin.

=== Video games ===
The tactical role-playing video game Steven Universe: Attack the Light! was released on April 2, 2015, for iOS and Android devices. It was developed by Grumpyface Studios in collaboration with Sugar for mobile devices. Players control Steven and three Crystal Gems to fight light monsters. A sequel, Steven Universe: Save the Light, was released for consoles in October 2017. Another sequel, Steven Universe: Unleash the Light, was released exclusively on Apple Arcade in November 2019. It was then rereleased on PC (Steam) and consoles in February 2021.

A rhythm-based mobile game, Steven Universe: Soundtrack Attack, was released on July 21, 2016, in the United States. A player-created Gem flees her pursuer through side-scrolling stages set to remixes of the series' music. Another mobile game, Steven Universe: Dreamland Arcade, was released in 2017; it is a collection of arcade games with characters from the series.

Steven Universe characters appear in Cartoon Network's kart racing game Formula Cartoon All-Stars and in the side-scrolling, beat-'em-up game Battle Crashers. In common with other Cartoon Network series, several browser-based games—including Heap of Trouble, Goat Guardian and Gem Bound—are available on the channel's website. In 2019, Minecraft released a Mash-Up Pack based on Steven Universe, and Brawlhalla, a free-to-play fighting game, added Steven Universe characters. In 2021, the platform fighter MultiVersus features characters, locations and elements from the show.

=== Comics ===
BOOM! Studios has published several limited comics series based on Steven Universe:

- An 8-month comic series, written by Jeremy Sorese and illustrated by Coleman Engle, was first published in August 2014.
- A graphic novel, the first in a planned series, was published on April 6, 2016. Also written by Sorese, drawn by Asia Kendrick Holton, and illustrated by Rosemary Valero-O'Connell, and based on a story by Ian Jones-Quartey, Too Cool for School is about Steven accompanying Connie to school.
- A four-part comic miniseries titled Steven Universe and the Crystal Gems was published in 2016. It is written by Josceline Fenton and illustrated by Chrystin Garland, and the covers are illustrated by Kat Leyh.
- A reboot comic series written by Melanie Gillman and illustrated by Katy Farina began publication in January 2017.
- A second graphic novel called Anti-Gravity was released in July 2017. It is written by Talya Perper and illustrated by Queenie Chan.
- A five-issue miniseries called Steven Universe: Harmony was first released in August 2018. It is written by S.M. Vidaurri and illustrated by Mollie Rose. The covers are illustrated by Marguerite Sauvage.

=== Toys and merchandise ===
In October 2015, Cartoon Network announced a line of toys based on Steven Universe, which would be sold by specialty retailers. For the 2015 holiday season, Funko made "Pop!" vinyl figures and Just Toys offered "blind bag" novelty products. PhatMojo sold plush figures and foam weapons, and Zag Toys released collectible bobbleheads and other mini-figures in early 2016. The following year, Toy Factory planned to sell a line of plush and novelty items. Cartoon Network sells a variety of products, including mugs, blankets and clothing, based on the show's episodes and characters.

=== Soundtracks ===
The first soundtrack album collecting songs from the first four seasons, Steven Universe Soundtrack: Volume 1, was released on June 2, 2017. The soundtrack debuted at number 22 on the Billboard 200, number two on the Soundtracks chart, and number one on the Independent Albums chart. In Europe, it reached number 28 on the UK Album Downloads Chart, nine on the country's Soundtrack chart, 56 on the nation's official Compilation chart, and 174 on the Ultratop Flanders album chart. An album of songs from the fifth and final season, Steven Universe: Volume 2 (Original Soundtrack) as well as a karaoke album were released on April 12, 2019. Volume 2 debuted at number 24 on the Soundtracks chart, number 28 on the Independent Albums chart, and number 14 on the Kid Albums chart. A soundtrack for the movie featuring its songs and score was released on September 3, 2019, peaking at number 57 on the Billboard 200, number five on the soundtrack chart, number six on the Independent chart, and number two on the Kid Albums chart. The soundtrack for Steven Universe Future was released on October 23, 2020. Five albums featuring the music score were released on May 29, June 26, July 31, August 28, and September 25, 2020, respectively.

== Reception ==
=== Popularity ===
Steven Universe has been considered one of the greatest animated television series of all time in various publications, particularly for its recognition of LGBTQ representation in children's television. The series ranked number 99 on BBC's 100 Greatest Television Series of the 21st Century, the last of four animated shows in the 21st century to be included on the list. IndieWire and GamesRadar+ ranked the series number 6 and number 12 as the greatest animated TV series in history lists, respectively. In a list by Vanity Fair, it is ranked at number 4 as one the best TV shows from the 2010s.

All five seasons of Steven Universe hold a perfect 100% rating on Rotten Tomatoes. The website's critical consensus for season five reads: "Having blossomed into a sophisticated mythology with a deeply moving subtext, Steven Universe remains a sparkling entertainment and perfect introduction to LGBTQ representation for children." Public interest in the series measured by Google Trends vastly outstripped that of Cartoon Network's other series in April 2016, which The A.V. Club called "definitive proof that Steven Universe is now Cartoon Network's flagship series". In 2019, TV Guide ranked Steven Universe number 61 in its selection of the top 100 contemporary television series, describing the series as "groundbreaking" with an "uplifting, self-affirming message".

=== Critical response ===
Steven Universe has been widely praised for its art, music, voice performances, storytelling and characterization. According to James Whitbrook of io9, it is an "equally rewarding watch" for adults and children, and Eric Thurm of Wired has called it "one of the stealthiest, smartest, and most beautiful things on the air". Critics have praised the "breathtaking beauty", "intriguing, immersive environments" and "loveably goofy aesthetic" of Steven Universe's art, writing highly of its distinctive, soft pastel backgrounds and its "gorgeous, expressive, clean animation". Reviewers also enjoyed the diverse, ensemble cast's voice acting, particularly that of Tom Scharpling's Greg, Zach Callison's "exuberant and expressive" work as Steven and Grace Rolek "singing her heart out" as Connie.

Aivi Tran and Steven "Surasshu" Velema's chiptune-inspired music has also been praised in reviews: Oliver Sava of The A.V. Club mentioned its range from "peppy retro" to Ghibli-esque "smooth jazz piano", Eric Thurm wrote that the musical numbers are characterized by "uplifting determination", and Whitbrook wrote that they have evolved from being "little ... goofy ditties" to an integral part of the show's storytelling. Thurm wrote for Pitchfork that "music matters in Rebecca Sugar's work", more than in most musicals, by structuring the characters' lives rather than merely telling a story. The series' original songs have also been praised. "Stronger Than You" has been referred to as a "power ballad", and the end credits song, "Love Like You", has been called "gutting" and an accurate depiction of the meaning of love.

=== Style and themes ===
Steven Universe, according to Eric Thurm, is a low-key, slice of life portrayal of childhood, an examination of unconventional family dynamics, a homage to anime, video games and other pop culture mainstays, and a "straightforward kids' show about superheroes". Jacob Hope Chapman of Anime News Network said the anime series Revolutionary Girl Utena and Sailor Moon are Steven Universe's strongest influences visually and structurally, reflected by its "predominantly playful tone, interrupted by crushing drama at key moments", and its "glorification of the strengths of femininity, dilution of gender barriers, and emphasis on a wide variety of relationships between women, aimed at a family audience". Steven Universe is known for making frequent references to Japanese anime, including Neon Genesis Evangelion, Akira, Cowboy Bebop, Dragon Ball Z, and Studio Ghibli films, along with Junji Ito's horror manga The Enigma of Amigara Fault.

According to Whitbrook, the series' "masterful sense of pace" allows it to integrate foreshadowing and worldbuilding into scenes, which makes an overarching, dramatic narrative emerge from what might otherwise be "monster of the week" episodes. The narration of a complex story from a child's perspective means its exposition remains "artfully restrained, growing in ambition with the series" and Steven's character. Whitbrook also says that Steven Universe's measured pace allows its characters to become "more complex and interesting than most of their counterparts on prestige dramas", developing "as real people and not entities serving narrative functions". The series explores increasingly-challenging facets of relationships, such as the possibility Pearl may partially resent Steven because he is the reason his mother Rose no longer exists, and the growing self-destruction of Pearl's "all-consuming passion" for Rose. Its action scenes—such as Estelle's song presenting the climactic fight in "Jail Break" as a contest between Garnet's loving relationship and Jasper's lone-wolf attitude—are occasionally cast as philosophical arguments.

==== Characters ====
Adams highlighted the "groundbreaking and inventive" portrayal of the complicated "mentor/caregiver/older sibling dynamic" between Steven and the Crystal Gems in a series which, at its core, is about sibling relationships. Thurm wrote that a notable emotional difference between Steven Universe, Adventure Time and Regular Show, is that the latter two series deal with their protagonists' transitions to adulthood whereas during its first season, Steven Universe was content to be "enamored with the simplicity of childhood". Steven slowly grows from being an obnoxious, tag-along child to an accepted member of the Crystal Gems in his own right by the end of the first season, a change brought about by increased insight and experience rather than age. Joe Cain noted in The Mary Sue that unlike heroes from antiquity (Hercules) and modern fiction (Luke Skywalker from Star Wars), Steven is defined by his mother's legacy rather than his father's; the preponderance of mother figures in the series underscores their rarity in other fiction. According to Kat Smalley of PopMatters, the Gems' alien nature, which prevents them from fully understanding the world they protect, is handled with "remarkable depth and intellectual rigor", even as they deal with human issues such as "depression, post-traumatic stress, and self-loathing" remaining from the long-past war for Earth.

Smalley characterized Steven Universe as part of a growing trend of cartoons that appeal to adults and children alike, which includes Avatar: The Last Airbender (2005), its sequel The Legend of Korra (2012), Adventure Time (2010) and Regular Show (2010). This is reflected in the series' outreach to minorities that seldom appear elsewhere in animation and its broader themes: instead of delivering genre-typical, mustache-twirling villains, Steven Universe "deals with issues of extraordinary violence and horror, depicts its characters in shades of grey, and subtly plays with matters of philosophy, morality, and interpersonal conflicts, all while refusing to reset any development to a status quo".

==== Gender and sexuality ====
"Gender is at the forefront of the conversation surrounding Steven Universe", according to Erik Adams of the A.V. Club, who noted that "the show's superheroes are all women". As a self-aware pastiche of magical girl anime, the series subverts the genre's premises by having Steven embody the loving 'femininity' of the typical magical girl protagonist without ridicule or losing his 'masculine' side. Whitbrook characterized the series as being "about love—all kinds of love", including non-traditional forms such as the motherly and friendly bond between Steven and the Gems, and Garnet as the "physical embodiment of a lesbian relationship".

When placing the series on the honor list of the 2015 Tiptree Award, which recognizes works of science fiction or fantasy that explore and expand gender roles, the jury wrote: "In the context of children's television, this show deals with gender in a much more open and mature way than is typical for the genre, and has some of the best writing of any cartoon ... In addition to showing men and women who do not necessarily conform to standard American gender ideals, the show also gives us an agender/non-binary character and a thoughtful exploration of growing up".

In 2015, Autostraddle's Mey Rude wrote that Steven Universe was the most-recent animated series for a younger audience with significant queer themes, such as the androgynous fusion Stevonnie and the romantic relationship between the Gems Ruby and Sapphire, whose fusion is the main character Garnet. This, according to Rude, reflects the growing prominence of these themes in children's cartoons; previous depictions were subtextual or minimal, such as the 2011 Adventure Time episode "What Was Missing", the 2014 series Clarence or (more explicit but unexplored) the 2014 finale of Nickelodeon's The Legend of Korra. In Steven Universe, LGBTQ themes are prominent as early as the first season's second half. The fifth season's engagement and wedding between Ruby and Sapphire was reportedly the first same-sex marriage proposal in a children's animated series. In their 2015 report, GLAAD stated that the show reflected the "diversity of the real world," noting that one of the show's protagonists, Garnet, is "the physical form of two female-presenting Gem beings who are in love", shown in episodes such as "The Answer", focusing the romantic relationship between Ruby and Sapphire. This led some to say the show has "heavy queer undertones." "The Answer" later earned the show its second Emmy nomination, one of the six for the show.

In September 2021, Abbey White, a non-binary reporter for Insider and The Hollywood Reporter, told the latter publication's "Hollywood Remixed" podcast that the whole idea behind the show is "an upending of gender expectation", with Steven as a "gender nonconforming boy" with a family of "feminine non-binary, non-gendered aliens", saying this is "laced in very conscious, purposeful ways throughout the entire series." Previously, Mashable had stated that some fans relate to Lars Barriga in certain respects to the transgender experience, like feelings of societal pressure and conformity, even though he is not a confirmed transgender character.

=== Fandom ===
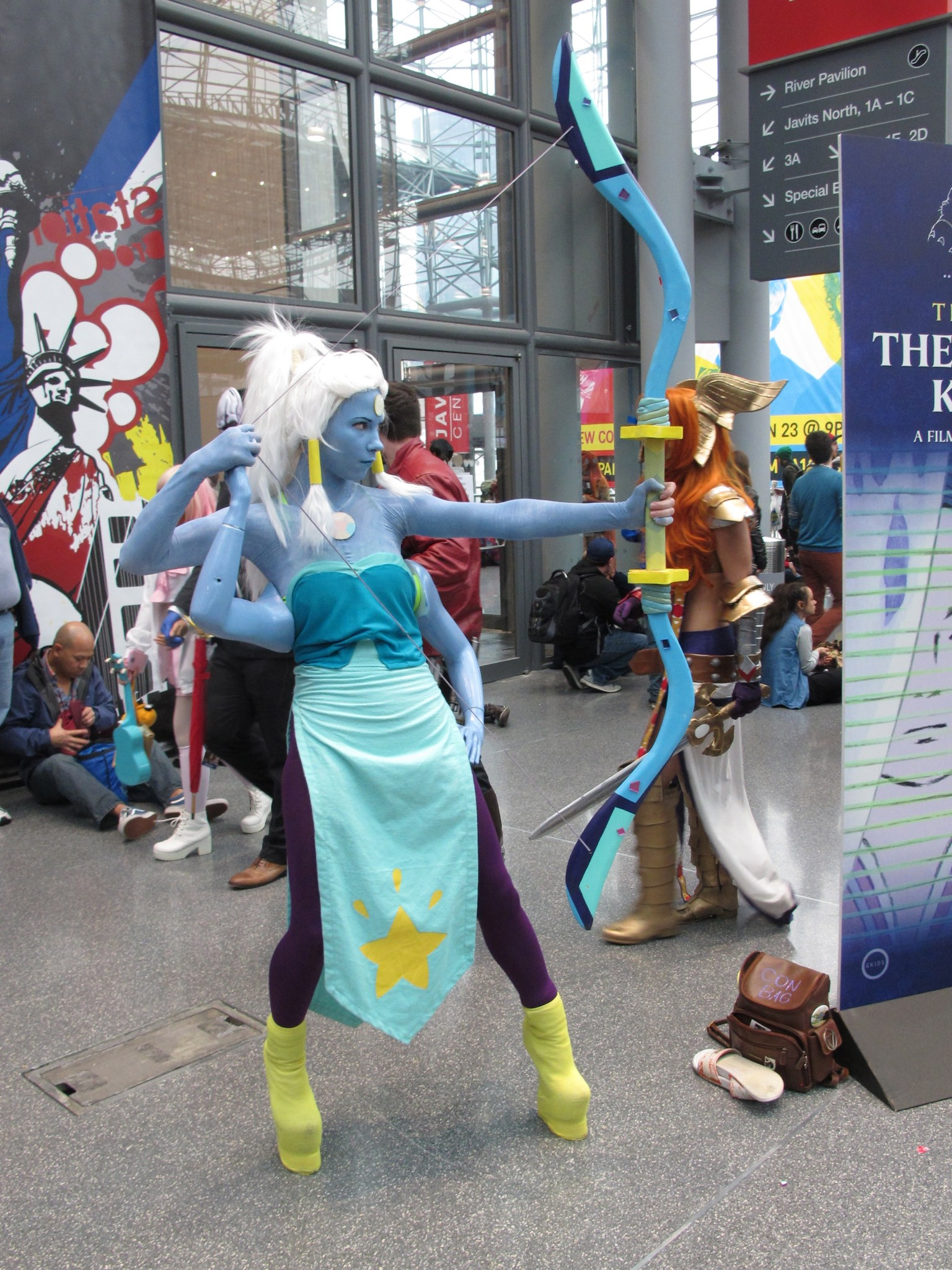
Cosplay of the character Opal in 2014

Fans have campaigned against censorship outside the United States of the series' representation of LGBT relationships. A fan campaign persuaded Cartoon Network's French subsidiary to re-record the song "Stronger than You" with a translation making the singer's love as explicit as the original, and another was launched in 2016 to protest Cartoon Network's British subsidiary's practice of removing scenes of affection between Gems from UK broadcasts. Swedish fans originated a protest petition after flirting between Gems was changed to unrelated dialogue in the Swedish broadcast of the episode "Hit the Diamond".

According to io9, "while most of the Steven Universe fandom is supportive and welcoming, there is a small subsection that's known for being extreme and hostile under the guise of inclusiveness". A fan artist attempted suicide in 2015 after she was bullied on social media because of the body proportions in her art, and in 2016 storyboard artist and writer Jesse Zuke quit Twitter after being harassed by fans over perceived support for a particular romantic relationship between characters.

A full-length fan-made episode titled "The Smothering", set in an alternate version of the story's continuity, was called "one of the more impressive pieces of work to come out of the Steven Universe fandom" in 2017 by io9. Beach City Con, a Steven Universe fan convention, was held in Virginia Beach on October 13–15, 2017.

=== Influence and legacy ===
Jones-Quartey, who left the show in 2015 to develop his OK K.O.! Let's Be Heroes, noted how the focus of Steven Universe on identity struck a chord with audiences, while ND Stevenson, showrunner of She-Ra and the Princesses of Power, described the show's effect on LGBTQ+ representation in Western animation, arguing that it changed the "landscape of animated shows when it first hit the air." In a later interview, Stevenson said their early conversations about queer relationships and characters in their own show were only possible because of Steven Universe. Additionally, in an interview with GLAAD's Raina Deerwater, Stevenson talked about queer representation in animation, citing Steven Universe alongside The Legend of Korra as an inspiring example of show that taught young fans to expect "nothing less than a variety of solid queer representation and central queer characters." Tracy Brown, a reviewer for the Los Angeles Times, argued that during its run, the show became the "gold standard" for Cartoon Network itself.

Legal scholar Monica Ramsy stated in a California Law Review article that the series disrupts "the retributive mediascape", modeling principles of restorative justice which rewrites the "justice narratives available for young viewers." Ramsy compared the series to retributive justice in other superhero cartoons such as Batman: The Animated Series, Spider-Man: The Animated Series, and Justice League/Justice League Unlimited, arguing that Steven Universe rejects the "typical hero warrior narrative", and has villains who suffer from "oppressive norms" rather than "unidimensional villains". The article was later shared by Jones-Quartey on Twitter, calling it some of the "most spot-on writing" about the series.

A former Cartoon Network executive, Katie Krentz, told Insider in 2021 that part of a shift toward more inclusion in animation, might be due, in part, to events at conventions, providing the example of rooms at Comic-Con filled with Steven Universe fans in their 20s, 30s, and 40s. Krentz further argued this sort of participation by fans gives executives and creators feedback on who is watching the show and will buy merchandise, and on a related note, what counts as "good" representation. Journalists for Insider also argued that the show was "the start of a wave of animated shows with LGBTQ representation." Jade King of TheGamer also asserted that She-Ra and the Princesses of Power "wouldn't exist without Steven Universe", noting a story told by Lee Knox Ostertag who said that his partner, ND Stevenson, used Steven Universe to prove to Netflix that shows with queer representation "have value, audiences, and a right to exist to show young people that being different is nothing to be ashamed of."

Matt Braly, the creator of Amphibia, told ComicBook that he was a big fan of the show, a friend of Rebecca Sugar, and said that Sugar showed that original cartoon music can be beautiful and soulful. He also argued that there are a lot of crossover themes between Steven Universe and Amphibia, noting that a few crew members had worked on the show, and adding "we've got some Steven DNA."

The series influenced some individuals in the entertainment industry. For instance, singer and songwriter Janelle Monáe, in January 2021, quoted a tweet saying that there was "absolutely nothing better than living outside the gender binary," with a GIF of Stevonnie, stating "'Are you a boy or a girl?' I'm an experience," and added the hashtag #IAmNonbinary." In an interview with The Cut a month after the tweet, she told the interviewer that she retweeted the GIF because it "resonated with me, especially as someone who has pushed boundaries of gender since the beginning of my career". Later, rapper and singer Lil Nas X, told a GQ interviewer, in November 2021, that he was going to commission someone to use the Diamonds' outfits and dress up like them and told the interviewer that Pink Diamond "did what she had to do."

=== Awards and nominations ===
Award nominations for Steven Universe
Year	Award	Category	Nominee(s)	Result
2014	41st Annie Awards	Outstanding Achievement in Character Design in an Animated TV/Broadcast Production	Danny Hynes and Colin Howard	Nominated
2014	41st Annie Awards	Outstanding Achievement in Production Design in an Animated TV/Broadcast Production	Steven Sugar, Emily Walus, Sam Bosma, Elle Michalka, and Amanda Winterstein (for "Gem Glow")	Nominated
2014	35th Young Artist Awards	Best Performance in a Voice-Over Role – Young Actor	Zach Callison (as Steven)	Nominated
2015	67th Primetime Creative Arts Emmy Awards	Short-format Animation	"Lion 3: Straight to Video"	Nominated
2015	James Tiptree Jr. Award	Honor List	Rebecca Sugar, Steven Universe	Won
2016	43rd Annie Awards	Best Animated TV/Broadcast Production For Children's Audience	"Jail Break"	Nominated
2016	43rd Annie Awards	Outstanding Achievement, Directing in an Animated TV/Broadcast Production	Ian Jones-Quartey (for "The Test")	Nominated
2016	43rd Annie Awards	Outstanding Achievement, Storyboarding in an Animated TV/Broadcast Production	Joe Johnston, Jeff Liu, and Rebecca Sugar (for "Jail Break")	Nominated
2016	Kids' Choice Awards 2016	Favorite Cartoon	Steven Universe	Nominated
2016	2016 Teen Choice Awards	Choice Animated Series	Steven Universe	Nominated
2016	68th Primetime Creative Arts Emmy Awards	Short-format Animation	"The Answer"	Nominated
2017	GLAAD Media Awards	Outstanding Comedy Series	Steven Universe	Nominated
2017	2017 Teen Choice Awards	Choice Animated Series	Steven Universe	Nominated
2017	69th Primetime Creative Arts Emmy Awards	Short-format Animation	"Mr. Greg"	Nominated
2018	GLAAD Media Awards	Outstanding Kids & Family Program	Steven Universe	Nominated
2018	2018 Teen Choice Awards	Choice Animated Series	Steven Universe	Nominated
2018	70th Primetime Creative Arts Emmy Awards	Short-format Animation	"Jungle Moon"	Nominated
2018	70th Primetime Creative Arts Emmy Awards	Outstanding Individual Achievement in Animation	Patrick Bryson	Won
2019	GLAAD Media Awards	Outstanding Kids & Family Program	Steven Universe	Won
2019	Golden Reel Awards	Short Form Animation	"Reunited"	Nominated
2019	Peabody Award	Children's & Youth Programming	Steven Universe	Won
2019	71st Primetime Creative Arts Emmy Awards	Short-format Animation	"Reunited"	Nominated
2020	47th Annie Awards	Best Commercial	Dove Self-Esteem Project x Steven Universe: "Social Media"	Nominated
2021	32nd GLAAD Media Awards	Outstanding Kids & Family Programming	Steven Universe (Note: For episodes of Steven Universe Future aired during eligibility year)	Nominated
2024	1st Velma Awards	Legacy Award	Steven Universe	Won
