= Super Mole Escape =

2012 video game

- Developer: Grumpyface Studios
- Publisher: Adult Swim Games
- Platform: iOS
- Release: August 9, 2012
- Genres: Endless runner, action
- Mode: Single-player

Super Mole Escape is an iOS endless runner action video game. it was developed by Grumpyface Studios and published by Adult Swim Games and released on August 9, 2012.

== Critical reception ==
Reception

Aggregate score
Aggregator	Score
Metacritic	85/100

Review scores
Publication	Score
Edge	7/10
Gamezebo	4.5/5
Pocket Gamer	4.5/5
TouchArcade	4.5/5

The game received "generally favorable" reviews according to the review aggregation website Metacritic.

Modojo wrote, "You won't play a more experimental, risky, fun and flamboyant endless-runner this year, and for that reason alone we're happy to recommend this as the best example of genre evolution we've seen in a very long time indeed. Bravo." Pocket Gamer said, "Blessed with instantly appealing gameplay, engaging presentation, and plenty of long-term challenge, Super Mole Escape is a must-have download." Gamezebo said, "Its tilt controls are some of the best I've seen in an endless runner (there are also touch controls, but I found myself preferring tilt), the graphics are as vibrant and charming as we've grown to expect from an [adult swim]-published game, and the inclusion of achievements and sundry unlockables makes the game dangerously addictive." TouchArcade said, "Super Mole Escape knows what it does well, and exploits it to its fullest." AppSpy said it was "Not an endless runner, but an endless tunneler, that has visual appeal plus addictive gameplay coupled with fair prices for upgrades." Edge wrote, "The thrill of the chase is still present [...] even if we've come to expect something a little more subversive from Adult Swim."
