= Castle Doombad =

2014 video game

- Developer: Grumpyface Studios
- Publishers: Grumpyface Studios (2024, Steam; 2025; Android & iOS); Adult Swim Games (2014–2019; Android & iOS); Yodo1 (2024; Android & iOS)
- Platforms: iOS, Android, Microsoft Windows, MacOS
- Release: January 9, 2014
- Genre: Tower defense
- Mode: Single-player

Castle Doombad is a 2014 tower defense game developed by Grumpyface Studios and published by Adult Swim Games. In the game, the player controls Dr. Lord Evilstein, a villain who must defend a castle from invading heroes. It was originally released on January 9, 2014, as a mobile title for iOS and Android, and a sequel titled Castle Doombad: Free to Slay was released on July 17, 2014. The game went on to receive numerous "Best of 2014" awards, including Metacritic's "25 Best Reviewed iOS games of 2014", and selected as one of Apple's "Best Apps of 2014". It was announced on March 20, 2023, that Castle Doombad was set to return as a "reimagined and expanded remake" with updated and remastered art, new content, and new features on Steam for Mac and PC.

== Gameplay ==
The player controls Dr. Lord Evilstein, who has kidnapped a local princess. They can construct traps and defenses to prevent heroes from saving her. Traps include minions that attack heroes, automatic traps such as trap doors, and manual traps such as spikes.

== Critical reception ==
Reception

Aggregate score
Aggregator	Score
Metacritic	88/100

Review scores
Publication	Score
Destructoid	9.5/10
Gamezebo	4/5
Hardcore Gamer	4/5
MacLife	4.5/5
Pocket Gamer	4/5
TouchArcade	5/5
National Post	8/10

The game received "generally favorable reviews" according to the review aggregation website Metacritic.
