= Amethyst (Steven Universe) =

Steven Universe character

- Steven Universe character
- First appearance: "The Time Thing" (2013)
- Created by: Rebecca Sugar
- Voiced by: Michaela Dietz

In-universe information
- Species: Gem
- Gender: Sexless / non-binary woman (she/her pronouns used)
- Weapon: Whip

Amethyst is a fictional character from the American animated television series Steven Universe, created by Rebecca Sugar. She is voiced by Michaela Dietz.

Based on the gemstone amethyst, she is a Gem, a fictional alien being that exists as a magical gemstone projecting a holographic body, and one of the four "Crystal Gems," a group of Gems who defend Earth. Her story arcs throughout the series mostly focus on overcoming her low self-esteem, mostly caused by her feeling inferior to other Gems.

== Development and casting ==
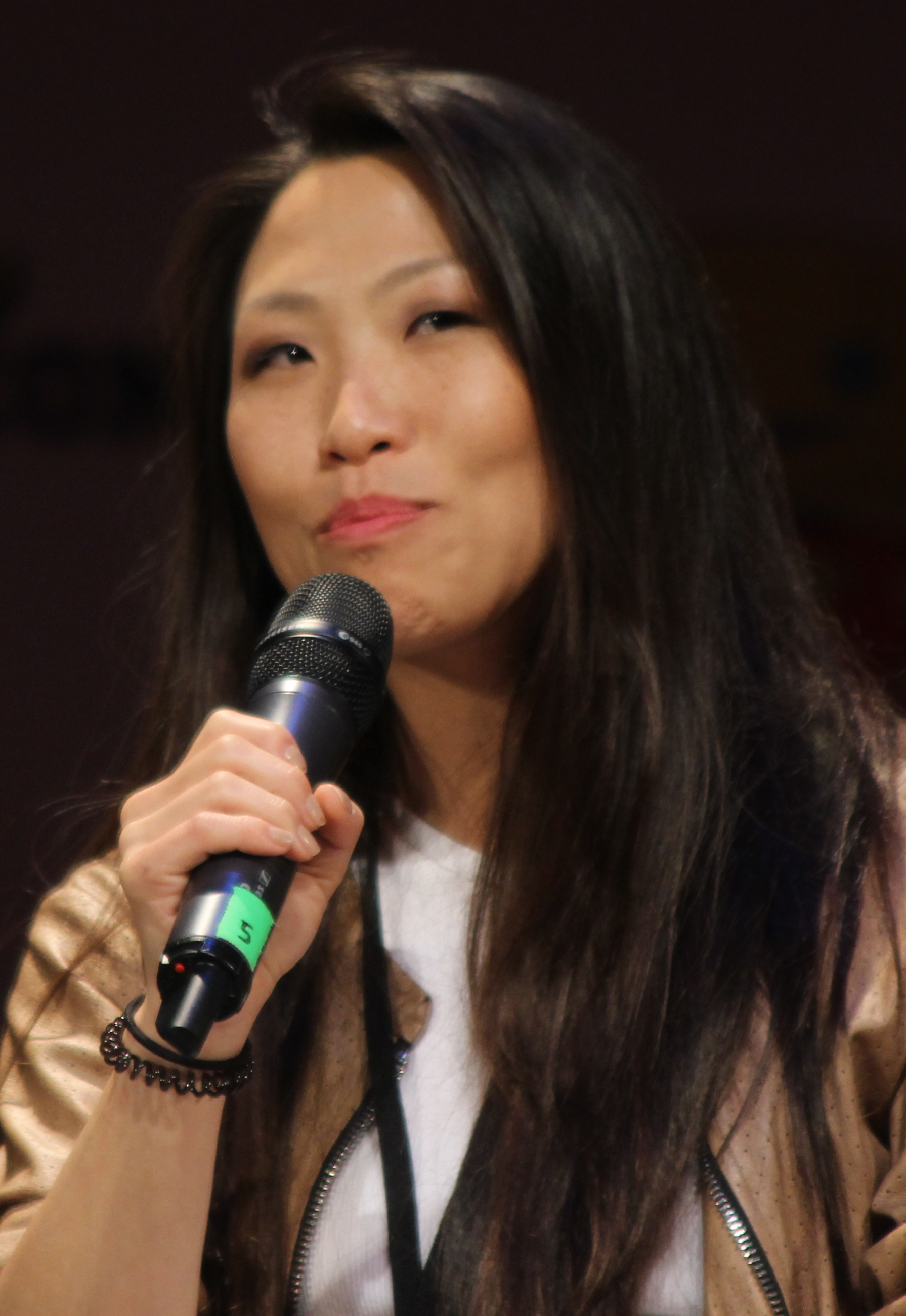
Amethyst is voiced by Michaela Dietz.

The visual designs of the Crystal Gems are based on simple shapes to match their personalities, as inspired by the Bauhaus theory of design: Amethyst is based on a sphere, while Garnet is a square and Pearl is a cone. Amethyst's look was redesigned between the pilot episode of Steven Universe and the first regular episode.

In a July 2014 interview, Dietz said she was excited to have a panel on the show, to see "the fans of the show and hear their thoughts," and praised the show's cast and crew. In an August 2014 interview, she noted that Amethyst was her "first experience voicing a cartoon character" and said that she was "having such a blast" voicing Amethyst.

Sugar said, in a 2014 AmA that Amethyst's room in the Crystal Temple is closest to her "actual lifestyle." In the same AmA, Sugar also stated that Amethyst's dance style is "freeform," a mix of club dancing and dancehall styles, saying the show's crew is "pretty loose with it" and that Amethyst does "whatever feels right."

In a January 2016 interview with the show's composers, Aivi Tran and Steven "Surrashu" Velema, the latter of whom did music for Amethyst, it was noted that the instruments she plays are a representation of her personality, like other Gems in the series. As such, she is shown with "loose and wild" drums, while Amethyst was represented in the show's music as an "eclectic drum kit, with electric bass and some...synths," and when she fused with Pearl, becoming Opal, both characters are "distinguishable in the music." Reviewer Caroline Framke also described Amethyst's drums as "spastic."

== Role in Steven Universe ==
She is one of the three Crystal Gems (with Pearl and Garnet), who, along with the titular Steven Universe, form the main characters of the series. She is more hedonistic and carefree than the other Gems and behaves as more of an older sister figure to Steven. She often encourages Steven to enjoy himself and is the only Gem to engage in eating for fun, as Gems do not require food to survive. From the gemstone in her chest, she can summon a purple whip. Although most Gems possess the ability to shapeshift, Amethyst uses it to her advantage the most, especially when pulling pranks.

Unlike Pearl and Garnet, who were allies of Steven's mother Rose Quartz in the ancient Gem war, Amethyst joined the Crystal Gems after the war ended. She was created on Earth to be one of many Amethyst soldiers in the Gem empire's army. However, she was created smaller and weaker than other Amethysts and emerged long after the others had departed, leaving her isolated for many years before being taken in by Rose Quartz. Michaela Dietz has spoken about how her experience as an adoptee informs her performance of Amethyst in this respect. She also was Greg's friend, but after Rose left, she blamed him, messed with him, and ended up ruining the friendship between them.

Her character arc centers on coming to accept the burden of responsibility and overcoming her poor self-image arising from her smaller stature and "defective" creation. As the series moves forward, she becomes more self-confident. During the fourth season, she meets the other Amethyst soldiers who were created alongside her, and their support and affection for her become a source of emotional validation. In Steven Universe Future, Amethyst runs the Gem Human Excellence Mentorship (GHEM) as an educator in Little Homeworld and remains Steven's friend, even as he tries to deal with his trauma.

== In other media ==
Amethyst appeared in many video games based on the series. This included the 2015 game Steven Universe: Attack the Light, 2017 game Steven Universe: Save the Light, and the 2019 game Steven Universe: Unleash the Light. Additionally, in December 2019, Amethyst was one of the Steven Universe characters, as did Pearl, Garnet, and Stevonnie, who appeared in Brawlhalla, free-to-play 2D platformer fighting game.

In February 2021, Amethyst appeared in an anti-racist PSA released by Cartoon Network, produced by Sugar and Ian Jones-Quartey. In the PSA, Amethyst sings with kids that "it doesn't matter if you're white, Black, or purple" and stops the production, saying that her purple color matters because she is an alien and saying it is "messed up" that she is being compared to people being different races, telling the kids "adding purple people into a lesson about human racism makes no sense."

In September 2019, Amethyst appeared in Steven Universe: The Movie, a film that is an offshoot from the series, bringing the events of the original Steven Universe and Steven Universe Future, with Steven working to restore her memories after they are wiped by Spinel, and that of the other Crystal Gems, while she later helps Steven try and restore Pearl's memories.

Amethyst also appeared in a 2018 crossover episode of OK K.O.! Let's Be Heroes titled "Crossover Nexus".

== Reception and influence ==
Amethyst was received positively. In 2015 and 2017, Dietz was nominated for Best Female Lead Vocal Performance in a Television Series – Comedy/Musical at the Behind the Voice Actor Awards, along with other members of the show's voice cast. Eric Thurm of Polygon described Amethyst as "chaotic" while Charles Pulliam-Moore of Gizmodo argued that Amethyst is exploring her identity throughout the show. On the other hand, Thurm praised the voice acting of Dietz. Others, like Brandon Zachary of CBR pointed to her "outward goofiness," with S.E. Fleenor of SYFY saying this manifested itself in her fusion with Steven, Smokey Quartz. Others described her personality as rambunctious and spontaneous and arguing that she grew to be one of the show's most emotionally mature characters.

Nicole Clark, a culture writer, related Amethyst and the other Crystal Gems to her own multiracial upbringings. Hannah Collins of CBR said Amethyst's fusions with other Gems, along with other Gem fusions, illustrated the issues with toxic relationships. Although ComicsAlliance and Paste reviewers praised her familial relations with Steven, calling it "heartwarming quasi-siblinghood," Thurm of The A.V. Club described her as the "angsty teen" of the Crystal Gems. Robert Lloyd of LA Times compared Amethyst to Bubbles in The Powerpuff Girls, another Cartoon Network show. Anna Swartz of Mic said that, in their view, Amethyst is "brash and messy," which Vrai Kaiser of The Mary Sue echoed, describing Amethyst as having "initial childishness" coupled with "usual brusque." Laura B. of The Geekiary described Amethyst as a self-critical Gem who is meant to fit into the "troublemaker" archetype, hostile to those around her, due to "lots of internalized self-hatred," but she later grows in self-confidence as the series progresses, in their view.
