= Steven Universe: Attack the Light =

Tactical role-playing video game

- Developer: Grumpyface Studios
- Publisher: Cartoon Network Games
- Director: Chris Graham
- Producer: Zach Moore
- Writers: Chris Graham; Rebecca Sugar (story); Ian Jones-Quartey (story)
- Composer: Dustin Bozovich
- Platforms: iOS, Android, Kindle Fire
- Release: WW: April 2, 2015
- Genre: Role-playing game
- Mode: Single-player

Steven Universe: Attack the Light is a role-playing video game developed by Grumpyface Studios and published by Cartoon Network Games. The game, based on the animated TV series Steven Universe and featuring a story written by series creator Rebecca Sugar, was released for iOS and Android mobile devices on April 2, 2015. An Apple TV/tvOS version was later developed, which added "Diamond Mode", a higher-difficulty version of the game with added bonuses. It was followed by Save the Light and Unleash the Light.

== Gameplay ==
Attack the Light is a simplified role-playing game in which Steven and the three Crystal Gems—Garnet, Amethyst, and Pearl—travel across five color-themed worlds. Players move across the map by swiping the touchscreen and can interact with chests, mechanisms, and hidden areas to obtain items that can either be used in battle or to open up other areas. Some areas may be inaccessible until players solve a puzzle or obtain the necessary item from another level.

During battles, in which the protagonists and the enemy take turns to attack, the Gems fight against the enemy while Steven provides support, able to use healing and defensive abilities and access items. Most of the actions characters can perform require Star Points, of which there are a limited supply during each turn, though players can use items to increase their Star Points or choose to save them for their next turn.

Similar to games such as the Paper Mario series, many of the actions performed feature gesture-based controls. Simple well-timed taps of the screen can be used to deal extra damage or reduce damage taken from enemy attacks. Other abilities, which can be unlocked as each character levels up with experience, feature unique mechanics such as aiming a shot or repeatedly swiping the screen.

If a Gem loses all of their Harmony (health), they will retreat into their gem until an item revives them or the battle ends, with the game ending if all three Gems are defeated. Players can find badges to equip to the Gems, giving them stat boosts, as well as earn currency that can be used to purchase additional items.

== Development and release ==
Attack the Light was developed by Grumpyface Studios. Rebecca Sugar, creator of the original series Steven Universe, was "instrumental" along with the show's supervising director Ian Jones-Quartey in the development of the game. It was released on both the iOS and Android platform on April 2, 2015. Cartoon Network promoted it with the broadcast of "Say Uncle", a non-canon crossover with Uncle Grandpa.

On December 24, 2024, Attack the Light and other Cartoon Network games were withdrawn from online distribution platforms.

== Reception ==
Reception

Aggregate score
Aggregator	Score
Metacritic	91/100

Review scores
Publication	Score
Gamezebo	4/5
Pocket Gamer	8/10
TouchArcade	5/5
148Apps	5/5

Attack the Light received critical acclaim. On Metacritic, the game has a score of 91/100, which indicates "universal acclaim". It was assessed as "superb" by Destructoid, whose reviewer wrote that combat was very well-implemented, providing complexity but not confusion, and that the game's strongest quality was its personality, thanks to drawing on the TV series' voice actors. Kotaku was also positive about the game, praising its unexpected complexity and depth as well as how it manages to capture the spirit of the TV series. Alexander Aciman of Time called it an "absolute necessity" for fans of the show and one of the five best games released on the iPhone for second week of April 2015. Stuart Dredge of TheGuardian.com called the Android version "quirky yet accessible" with "bags of replayability". Like this version, Dredge named the iPhone release one of the top games for its platform of the first week of April 2015, ultimately dubbing it "one of the most inventive, fun games of the year so far". Matt Keeley of Unicorn Booty praised the Apple TV edition of the game, calling it a "playable episode", but noted a few instances where the game would freeze on the device.
