= Pearl (Steven Universe) =

- Steven Universe character
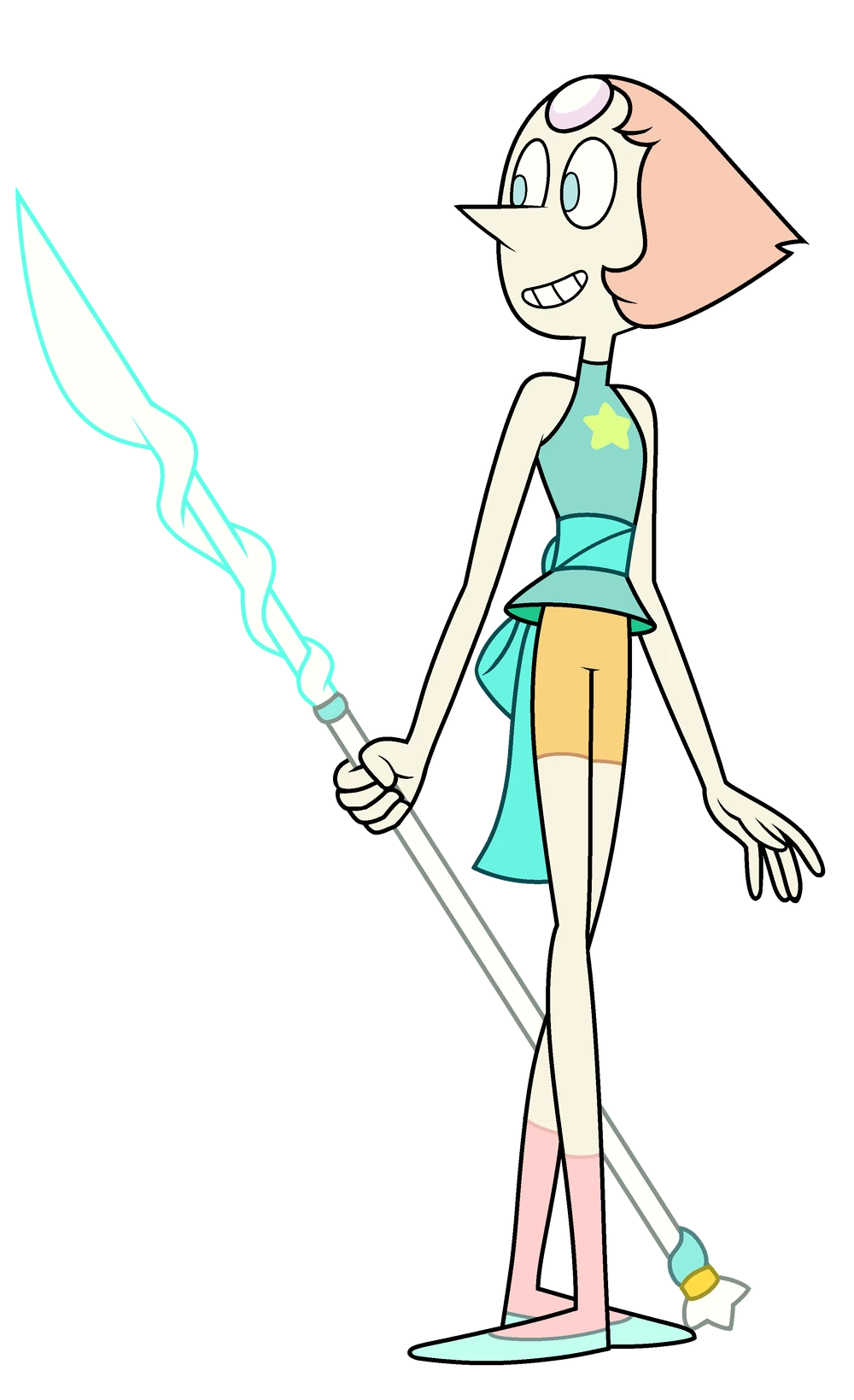
- First appearance: "The Time Thing" (2013)
- Created by: Rebecca Sugar
- Voiced by: Deedee Magno Hall

In-universe information
- Species: Gem
- Gender: non binary / non-binary woman (she/her pronouns used)
- Weapon: Spear; Sword; Tonfa

Pearl is a fictional character from the American animated television series Steven Universe, created by Rebecca Sugar. Based on the gemstone pearl, she is a Gem, an alien being that exists as a magical gemstone projecting a holographic body.

She is portrayed as a loving, gentle and delicate motherly figure for Steven, the protagonist of the series, and can be a fierce fighter. However, she also tends to be overprotective, has low self-esteem, and is deeply overwhelmed with grief caused by the loss of Steven's mother Rose Quartz, whom she loved.

She is frequently praised for being a positive depiction of a queer character, though her strong obsession with Rose has been described as "unhealthy".

== Development and casting ==
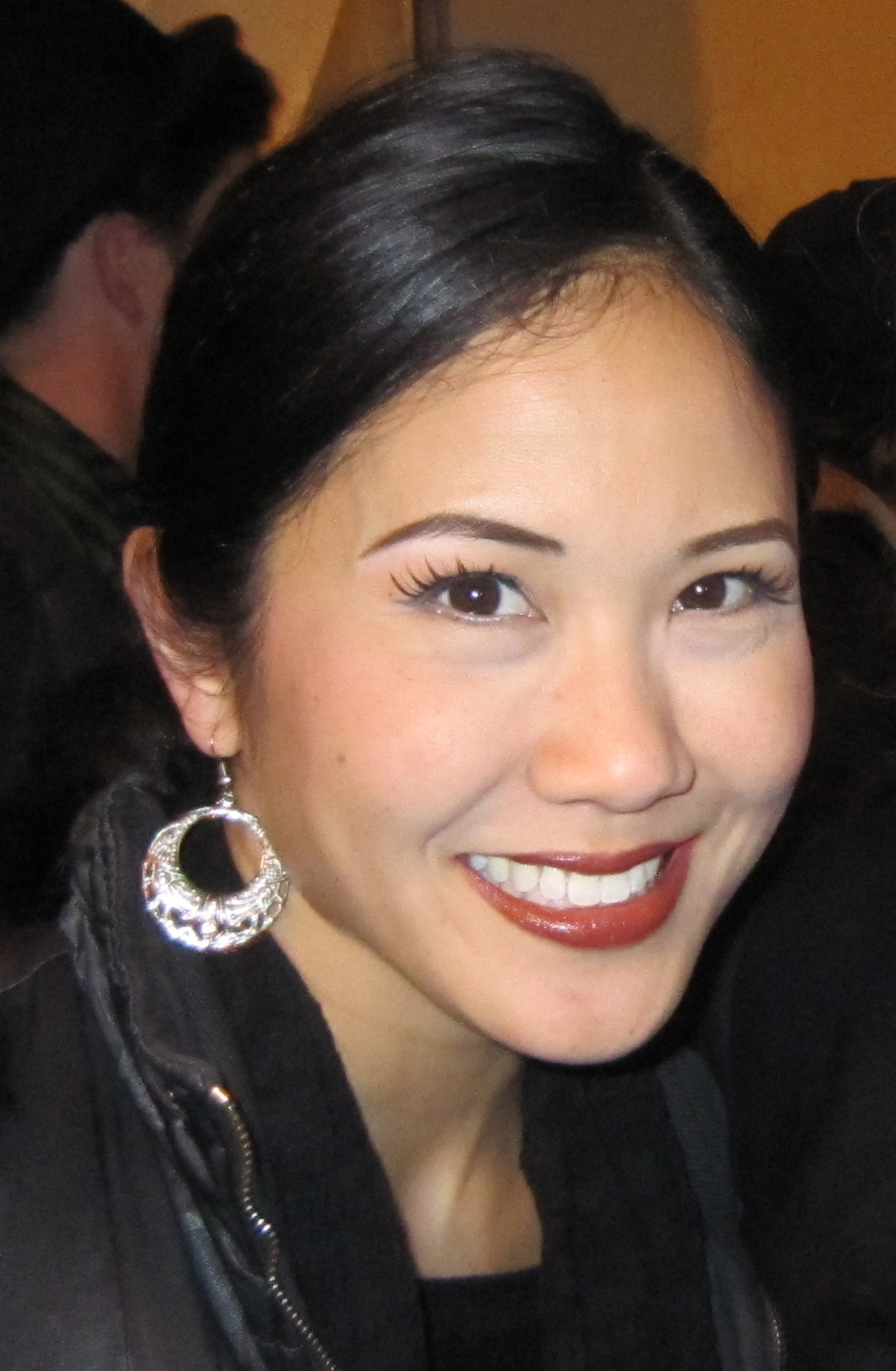
Pearl is voiced by Deedee Magno Hall.

Pearl's look was redesigned between the pilot episode of Steven Universe and the first regular episode. Originally having peach hair styled in a quiff and a much more intricate outfit, by "Gem Glow", she had the ballerina-esque design she retained before her regeneration in "Steven the Sword Fighter".

Pearl's voice actress, Deedee Magno Hall, started voice acting at a young age for The All-New Mickey Mouse Club. She moved on to do Broadway performances in the 1990s and 2000s, such as Miss Saigon and Wicked, but was contacted by Rebecca Sugar to portray a role in Steven Universe in 2013. Pearl was her first major role in an animated series.

== Role in Steven Universe ==
Alongside Garnet, Amethyst and protagonist Steven, Pearl is one of the Crystal Gems, a group of Gems that protect humanity and the Earth from danger. Pearl has been described as "intense [and] with a laser focus".

In Gem culture, Pearls are said to be "made-to-order servants" who serve higher-class Gems. Due to their status as simple servants meant for "standing around and looking nice and holding your stuff", they are seen as status symbols. Pearl displays a strong inferiority complex and self-esteem issues stemming from the fact that she was created to be a servant; she values her independence but sometimes has trouble learning not to feel subordinate to others. Despite her struggles, Pearl learned to fight and became a formidable swordfighter. She can also summon a spear from the gemstone in her forehead.

The fifth-season episode "A Single Pale Rose" reveals that Pearl was originally the servant of Pink Diamond, a Gem leader who eventually gave up her status to become Rose Quartz, the leader of the Crystal Gems. Although Rose encouraged Pearl's independence, Pearl never lost her devotion to Rose, which included romantic attraction, even after Rose "gave up her physical form" to allow Steven to be born. According to Vrai Kaiser of The Mary Sue, Pearl deals with severe unresolved grief, coupled with deep-seated issues with self-worth, resulting in her falling prey to "powerful, impulsive emotions" whenever Rose is mentioned. Naith Payton of PinkNews described Pearl's devotion to Rose as "unhealthy and obsessive". Pearl works to correct these issues, and the show is written in a way that allows watchers to sympathize with her.

== Reception ==
Ben Bertoli of Kotaku stated that Pearl is a character that a viewer may dislike at the start of the series, but that she becomes more relatable as the story continues and the viewer learns more about her. Sara Goodwin of The Mary Sue even described her as "the most human" of the Gems because of how she struggles with "bitterness, thoughts of inadequacy, and jealousy". Though she stated that Pearl can often be "insufferable", Goodwin likes the character for her humanity and hard work.

In 2014, Deedee Magno won a Behind the Voice Actor Award, in the category "Best Female Lead Vocal Performance in a Television Series - Comedy/Musical", for her portrayal of Pearl.

Pearl was positively received for being a lesbian character in an animated series, following a pattern of LGBT themes in children's animated series such as Adventure Time and The Legend of Korra. The Mary Sue praised the show for not falling into the "psycho lesbian" trope, which "often casts queer women as [...] predators of would-be heterosexuals", even in its depiction of Pearl's jealousy when Rose shows interest in a male character in flashbacks.

=== Censorship ===
A short flashback scene in which Pearl intimately dances with Rose in order to fuse with her, from the episode "We Need to Talk", was censored by Cartoon Network UK for British audiences, as they felt that "the slightly edited version is more comfortable for local kids and their parents".
