= Grumpyface Studios =

Mobile game developer

Grumpyface Studios, LLC
- Logo since 2011
- Industry: Video games
- Founded: June 2010; 16 years ago
- Headquarters: Phoenix, Arizona, U.S.
- Key people: Chris Graham (founder, creative director); Justin Booth (art director, game design lead); Tyler Maitland (animation, technical art director, game design lead)
- Products: Games for video game consoles, Android and iOS
- Number of employees: 10
- Website: Official website

Grumpyface is a mobile game developer based in Phoenix, Arizona, United States. It was founded by Chris Graham in June 2010. They are best known for their collaboration with Adult Swim Games and Cartoon Network Games, and have developed over seven titles between the two publishers. Some of Grumpyface's most popular titles include Castle Doombad, Super Mole Escape, and Steven Universe: Attack the Light!.

== Games released ==
=== Wispin ===
Wispin is an arena based arcade game featuring a unique "color-matching" twist. It was released for the iPhone on November 18, 2010. The iPad version, Wispin HD, was selected as Apple's iTunes "Game of the Week" on March 10, 2011.

=== Bring Me Sandwiches!! ===
Bring Me Sandwiches!! is a cartoony 2D puzzle-platform game released on the iOS App Store on October 10, 2011, and published by Adult Swim Games. It received a Metacritic score of 82.

=== Super Mole Escape ===
Super Mole Escape is a cartoony 2D top-down "endless digger" released on the iOS App Store on July 30, 2012, and published by Adult Swim Games. The game has a Metacritic score of 85% based on 9 critic reviews.

=== The Amazing World of Gumball: Mutant Fridge Mayhem ===
Mutant Fridge Mayhem is a 2D arena-based "beat em up" published by Cartoon Network and released on the iOS App Store on November 27, 2012. It received an Honorable Mention as part of the "Cynopsis Kids 2nd Annual !magination Awards 2013" for "Best Video Game for a TV Series/Special".

=== Regular Show: Ghost Toasters ===
Ghost Toasters is a side-scrolling shooter published by Cartoon Network and released on the iOS App Store and Google Play on November 21, 2013. It is Grumpyface Studios's first Android game.

=== Castle Doombad ===
Castle Doombad is a tower-defense game where players take on the role of the villainous Dr. Lord Evilstein, as he arms his castle with deadly traps in an attempt to prevent heroes from retrieving their stolen princess. It was released December 13, 2013, for the iOS App Store and Google Play, and a "Free to Slay" edition was released in January 2014. The game went on to receive numerous "Best of 2014" awards including Metacritic's "25 Best Reviewed iOS games of 2014", and was selected as one of Apple's top games of 2014. It was published by Adult Swim Games.

=== Area 777 ===
Area 777 is a hybrid slot machine/lane defense arcade game starring the enigmatic Chazz Fabulous, a self-absorbed stage magician who is Las Vegas' only hope of stopping an alien invasion. It was published by Adult Swim Games and released for the iOS App Store and Google Play on January 5, 2015.

=== Adventure Time: Game Wizard ===
Adventure Time: Game Wizard is a side-scrolling Metroidvania platform game. Players can draw a level on paper and capture it with their device camera, making it playable in the game. The game was co-developed by Grumpyface and Pixel Press for Cartoon Network Games, and released on the iOS App Store and Google Play Games on January 15, 2015. The game was featured by Apple in the "Best Apps for Kids" category on iTunes.

"Weird Al" Yankovic stars as the villainous Doodle Wizard, a character created for the game.

=== Steven Universe: Attack the Light! ===
Attack the Light! is a 2015 role-playing game based on the animated series Steven Universe. It features an original story written by Ian Jones-Quartey and series creator Rebecca Sugar. Attack the Light! is the seventh game developed by Grumpyface Studios for Cartoon Network.

=== Steven Universe: Save the Light ===
Save the Light is a direct sequel to Attack the Light!, released on October 31, 2017, on PlayStation 4 and November 3, 2017, for Xbox One, it is the first game of the company released on consoles, it was released for PC on August 13, 2018, and for Nintendo Switch on October 30, 2018.

=== Steven Universe: Unleash the Light ===
Unleash the Light is the third game in the Steven Universe "Light Series", directly following Save the Light, released on November 27, 2019, for Apple Arcade. The game was later released on Nintendo Switch, Xbox One, Xbox Series X/S, PlayStation 4, and PC through Steam on February 19, 2021.

=== Teeny Titans ===
Released on 22 June 2016 (June 22, 2016). Last updated on 25 March 2020 (March 25, 2020).

A game based on the Teen Titans Go! animated series. It follows the main character, Robin, as he seeks to be the best figure fighter in Jump City. A new craze has swept through Jump City, home to some of the DC universe's most noteworthy heroes (including the Justice League and the titular Teen Titans). A new toyline of action figures that can "come to life" on a computer screen, much like the real world "Toys to Life" video game trend. A follow-up sequel was released in 2018 to tie in with the film Teen Titans Go! To the Movies.
