= List of animated series with LGBTQ characters: 2015–2019 =

The years of 2015 to 2019 saw the number of LGBTQ characters, building upon progress from 2010 to 2014, in animated series increase, changing the landscape when it came to representation. This includes Western animated series such as The Loud House, Danger & Eggs, Mysticons, OK K.O.! Let's Be Heroes, Castlevania, Big Mouth, She-Ra and the Princesses of Power, Twelve Forever, Craig of the Creek, and Harley Quinn. LGBTQ characters also appeared prominently in anime such as Flip Flappers, Miss Kobayashi's Dragon Maid, Bloom into You, and Given.

This list only includes recurring characters, otherwise known as supporting characters, which appear frequently from time to time during the series' run, often playing major roles in more than one episode, and those in the main cast are listed below. LGBTQ characters which are guest stars or one-off characters are listed on the pages focusing exclusively on gay, lesbian, non-binary, and bisexual animated characters, and on pages listing fictional trans, pansexual, asexual, and intersex characters.

The entries on this page are organized alphanumerically by duration dates and then alphabetically by the first letter of a specific series.

== 2015 ==
| Duration | Show title | Character debut date | Characters | Identity | Notes | Country |
|---|---|---|---|---|---|---|
| 2015 | Valkyrie Drive: Mermaid | October 10, 2015 | Charlotte Scharsen | Lesbian | The series first antagonist. She has a harem of Extars (other girls) – called the Adel ("nobility") – that she uses all at once when fighting her opponents. She strives to bring Mermaid under her thumb, but is later seduced as a willing puppet Governor by Momoka. | Japan |
| 2015 | Valkyrie Drive: Mermaid | October 10, 2015 | Kasumi Shigure | Lesbian | Kasumi is the commander of Wärter who is opposed to Charlotte's despotic regime over Mermaid's residents. She is in a relationship with Hibiki who had been so traumatized by her experience at Mermaid that she refused to leave her room. She decided to join the fight at the very end with the purpose of not letting anyone else suffer the same way she did, apologizing to Kasumi for leaving her fight alone the whole time. | Japan |
| 2015 | Valkyrie Drive: Mermaid | October 10, 2015 | Hibiki Kenjo | Lesbian | Kasumi is the commander of Wärter who is opposed to Charlotte's despotic regime over Mermaid's residents. She is in a relationship with Hibiki who had been so traumatized by her experience at Mermaid that she refused to leave her room. She decided to join the fight at the very end with the purpose of not letting anyone else suffer the same way she did, apologizing to Kasumi for leaving her fight alone the whole time. | Japan |
| 2015 | Valkyrie Drive: Mermaid | October 10, 2015 | Mamori Tokonome | Lesbian | Mamori and Mirei are in a romantic/sexual relationship. Mirei states that she would have had no reason to live if she had not met Mamori. In one of the OVA shorts, it was revealed that Mirei used to be in a relationship with Momoka, the second antagonist. | Japan |
| 2015 | Valkyrie Drive: Mermaid | October 10, 2015 | Mirei Shikishima | Lesbian | Mamori and Mirei are in a romantic/sexual relationship. Mirei states that she would have had no reason to live if she had not met Mamori. In one of the OVA shorts, it was revealed that Mirei used to be in a relationship with Momoka, the second antagonist. | Japan |
| 2015 | Valkyrie Drive: Mermaid | October 17, 2015 | Meifeng Sakura | Lesbian | A crafty girl who speaks Kansai dialect and is often seen wearing a partial cowboy outfit. She often holds bets and scams to make money which she can use to activate her Extar ability in the form of a golden mech suit. The use of her power consumes both the money and her clothes, leaving her in the nude when her power shuts off. She also seems to like observing Mamori and Mirei when they drive. | Japan |
| 2015 | Valkyrie Drive: Mermaid | October 24, 2015 | Rain Hasumi | Lesbian | Rain and Lady J are passionate lovers. Lady J is able to transform into a motorbike without her partner's aid. When both girls' Extar forms are combined, they turn into a powerful jet. | Japan |
| 2015 | Valkyrie Drive: Mermaid | October 24, 2015 | Lady J | Lesbian | Rain and Lady J are passionate lovers. Lady J is able to transform into a motorbike without her partner's aid. When both girls' Extar forms are combined, they turn into a powerful jet. | Japan |
| 2015 | Valkyrie Drive: Mermaid | November 28, 2015 | Momoka Sagara | Lesbian | The series' second antagonist. She harbored a deep hatred of Mirei for "abandoning" her, as shown in the episode "Takeover", which turned her into a homicidal maniac, and has volunteered herself for further enhancement; they enable her to transform her chosen Extar into any weapon of her choice and absorb A Virus carriers to enhance her Arm's power. It was revealed at the end of the series that she and Mirei were in a past relationship while they were Soldiers. In one of the OVA shorts, their relationship was confirmed to be sexual. | Japan |
| 2015 | Valkyrie Drive: Mermaid | December 5, 2015 | E9 | Lesbian | E9 is one of the soldiers who have infiltrated Mermaid's Wärter. In Episode 10, she sexually assaults other girls using a mysterious power to inspect their bodies. | Japan |
| 2015 | Yurikuma Arashi | January 5, 2015 | Kureha Tsubaki | Lesbian | The main protagonists of the series are presented as having various sexual encounters and romantic relationships as the growth of hatred towards bears grows within Kureha who lost her girlfriend, Sumika and her mother, Reia by the hands of them. about why her mother and Sumika died. As such, she accepts bears even more and becomes one herself, embarking on a romantic relationship with Ginko. | Japan |
| 2015 | Yurikuma Arashi | January 5, 2015 | Sumika Izumino | Lesbian | The main protagonists of the series are presented as having various sexual encounters and romantic relationships as the growth of hatred towards bears grows within Kureha who lost her girlfriend, Sumika and her mother, Reia by the hands of them. about why her mother and Sumika died. As such, she accepts bears even more and becomes one herself, embarking on a romantic relationship with Ginko. | Japan |
| 2015 | Yurikuma Arashi | January 5, 2015 | Ginko Yurishiro | Lesbian | The main protagonists of the series are presented as having various sexual encounters and romantic relationships as the growth of hatred towards bears grows within Kureha who lost her girlfriend, Sumika and her mother, Reia by the hands of them. about why her mother and Sumika died. As such, she accepts bears even more and becomes one herself, embarking on a romantic relationship with Ginko. | Japan |
| 2015 | Yurikuma Arashi | January 5, 2015 | Lulu Yurigasaki | Lesbian | The main protagonists of the series are presented as having various sexual encounters and romantic relationships as the growth of hatred towards bears grows within Kureha who lost her girlfriend, Sumika and her mother, Reia by the hands of them. about why her mother and Sumika died. As such, she accepts bears even more and becomes one herself, embarking on a romantic relationship with Ginko. | Japan |
| 2015 | Yurikuma Arashi | January 5, 2015 | Yurika Hakonaka | Lesbian | The main protagonists of the series are presented as having various sexual encounters and romantic relationships as the growth of hatred towards bears grows within Kureha who lost her girlfriend, Sumika and her mother, Reia by the hands of them. about why her mother and Sumika died. As such, she accepts bears even more and becomes one herself, embarking on a romantic relationship with Ginko. | Japan |
| 2015–2016 | Durarara!!×2 | January 10, 2015 | Mairu Orihara | Bisexual | The twins Mairu and Kururi, the sisters of the series' antagonist Izaya Orihara, are bisexual characters, having crushes on male characters, while being opposites, but still work together. They also appear in Durarara!!. | Japan |
| 2015–2016 | Durarara!!×2 | January 10, 2015 | Kururi Orihara | Bisexual | The twins Mairu and Kururi, the sisters of the series' antagonist Izaya Orihara, are bisexual characters, having crushes on male characters, while being opposites, but still work together. They also appear in Durarara!!. | Japan |
| 2015–2017 | Mobile Suit Gundam: Iron-Blooded Orphans | October 4, 2015 | Yamagi Gilmerton | Gay | He's in love with another male, Norba Shino, claiming he'd rather die together with his love than to live without him. Later it was confirmed that Norba had feelings for Yamagi. | Japan |
| 2015–2017 | Mobile Suit Gundam: Iron-Blooded Orphans | December 18, 2016 | Norba Shino | Bisexual | A captain, he acts like a joker, and is a slightly flamboyant eccentric who's suggested to reciprocate another boy's romantic affections, in episodes like "If This Is the End". In a radio broadcast, his voice actor, Murata Taishi, confirmed him as bisexual, having feelings for Yamagi and various women. | Japan |
| 2015–2021 | F Is for Family | November 25, 2021 | Louis Chilson | Gay | Louis Chilson is Sue's brother. He was an unseen character who was mentioned in earlier seasons. Louis was previously disowned by his parents for being gay. He eventually appears in person and reconciles with his parents in the fifth and final season. Louis is voiced by gay actor Neil Patrick Harris. | United States |
| 2015–2025 | Is It Wrong to Try to Pick Up Girls in a Dungeon? | July 31, 2019 | Apollo | Bisexual | Apollo is bisexual as he has many male members of his familia that he loves and also shows sexual desire towards Bell Cranel, a male adventurer. In addition, when he was in heaven he was besotted with the female goddess Hestia, much to her disgust. | Japan |

== 2016 ==
| Duration | Show title | Character debut date | Characters | Identity | Notes | Country |
|---|---|---|---|---|---|---|
| 2016 | Flip Flappers | October 6, 2016 | Cocona | Lesbian | Cocona is coming to terms with her sexuality and realizes she loves Papika. | Japan |
| 2016 | Flip Flappers | October 6, 2016 | Papika | Lesbian | Papika realizes her love for Cocona, and their love for each other, during a fight with Cocona's mother in the episode "Pure Howling." | Japan |
| 2016 | Keijo | October 27, 2016 | Mio Kusakai | Lesbian | She is known to be a lesbian who flirts with other girls, often engaging in molestation. | Japan |
| 2016 | Kiznaiver | April 10, 2016 | Honoka Maki | Bisexual | Honoka is in love with a girl named Ruru and wants a romantic relationship with her, as shown in the show's sixth and seventh episodes. Maki later has feelings for a male friend named Yuta and their attractions toward each other are reciprocal. | Japan |
| 2016 | Kiznaiver | April 10, 2016 | Ruru | Lesbian | Ruru fell in love with Honoka and sought a romantic relationship with her, as noted in the show's sixth and seventh episodes, but later died, something which Honoka regrets. | Japan |
| 2016 | The High School Life of a Fudanshi | August 17, 2016 | Yūjirō Shiratori | Gay | Yūjirō is a gay effeminate crossdresser with a liking toward men, as indicated in episodes such as "Everyone's Fun Times", with strong "female power". | Japan |
| 2016 | Yuri on Ice | November 23, 2016 | Seung-Gil Lee | Gay | In the official character information, as well as said by Kubo Mitsurou, Seung-Gil is described as not liking women even though he is a "handsome skater". | Japan |
| 2016–2017 | Super Lovers | May 11, 2016 | Kiyoka | Trans woman | Seiji Takamori, better known as Kiyoka, runs a bar/café with her high school classmate, Haru, is transgender and appears to prefer men. She once confessed to Haru in the episode "Cloudy Sky", and been turned down. | Japan |
| 2016–2017 | Nanbaka | October 5, 2016 | Jyugo | Bisexual | Jyugo is one of the inmates in Cell 13 of Nanba Prison, and the main character of the series. In the first episode, he established himself as someone who likes guys and girls. | Japan |
| 2016–2018 | Voltron: Legendary Defender | June 10, 2016 | Takashi Shirogane | Gay | Shiro and Adam were romantically involved before the start of the Kerberos mission, as shown in the episode "A Little Adventure" and others. However they broke up. Shiro went into space and several years later Adam dies fighting the Galra. However, the epilogue at the end of the eighth and final season, shows Shiro being married to Curtis, a background character introduced in Season 8. | United States |
| 2016–2018 | Voltron: Legendary Defender | August 10, 2018 | Adam | Gay | Shiro and Adam were romantically involved before the start of the Kerberos mission, as shown in the episode "A Little Adventure" and others. However they broke up. Shiro went into space and several years later Adam dies fighting the Galra. However, the epilogue at the end of the eighth and final season, shows Shiro being married to Curtis, a background character introduced in Season 8. | United States |
| 2016–2018 | Voltron: Legendary Defender | August 10, 2018 | Curtis | Gay | Shiro and Adam were romantically involved before the start of the Kerberos mission, as shown in the episode "A Little Adventure" and others. However they broke up. Shiro went into space and several years later Adam dies fighting the Galra. However, the epilogue at the end of the eighth and final season, shows Shiro being married to Curtis, a background character introduced in Season 8. | United States |
| 2016–2023 | Caillou's New Adventures | March 6, 2018 | Clementine's Mother | Lesbian | In the season five episode "The Wedding", Clementine's mother marries her girlfriend Jasmine. | United States |
| 2016–2023 | Caillou's New Adventures | July 16, 2021 | Jasmine | Lesbian | In the season five episode "The Wedding", Clementine's mother marries her girlfriend Jasmine. | United States |
| 2016–2025 | My Hero Academia | April 21, 2018 | Yawara Chatora/Tiger | Trans man | Chatora, also known as Tiger, is a Pro Hero and member of the Wild, Wild Pussycats. | Japan |
| 2016–2025 | My Hero Academia | April 21, 2018 | Kenji Hikiishi/Magne | Trans woman | Hikiishi, also known as Magne, is a villain affiliated with the League of Villains and part of its Vanguard Action Squad. | Japan |
| 2016–present | The Loud House | May 2, 2016 | Luna Loud | Bisexual | Luna shows attraction to Hugh, Lincoln's tutor, in "Study Muffin", and sends a love letter to a girl named Sam in "L is for Love". Sam seems to feel similarly about Luna as shown in the latter episode. Sam Sharp appears to reciprocate Luna's feelings in that episode and others, with Lori describing them as beginning to date in the episode "Racing Hearts", though neither character calls their excursion a date throughout the episode. In "Undercover Mom", Luna refers to Sam as her girlfriend. However, in June 2021, Kevin Sullivan, a story editor for The Loud House told Insider that Luna was intended to a lesbian, but said that he was glad the team did not push it further because Luna then becomes "representative of so many more young people struggling with their identity," implying that fan interpretations of her as bisexual or other sexualities were still valid. Sam Sharp is voiced by pansexual and non-binary actor Alyson Stoner. | United States |
| 2016–present | The Loud House | June 15, 2017 | Sam Sharp | Lesbian | | United States |
| 2016–present | The Loud House | July 20, 2016 | Howard and Harold McBride | Gay | Howard and Harold are the adoptive fathers of Clyde McBride, who is the best friend of protagonist Lincoln Loud. Howard and Harold are overprotective of their son and shower Clyde with attention. They are the first pair of married male characters to be depicted on a Nickelodeon series. Wayne Brady, the first voice of Harold, is pansexual. | United States |
| 2016–present | The Loud House | July 21, 2016 | Dana Dufresne | Trans woman | She first appeared as the host (and judge) of a beauty pageant in "Toads and Tiaras" and reappeared in the episode "Gown and Out" in August 2018. Maddie Taylor, who does voice over for the character, revealed in August 2019 that the character had transitioned from a man to a trans woman, like herself, and said that the character would return in another episode within season 4. However, Season 4 concluded on July 23, 2020, although Dana would later reappear in the Season 6 episode "Prize Fighter" and further episodes. | United States |
| 2016–present | The Loud House | February 22, 2017 | Lainey | Lesbian | Lainey, one of Lynn's roller derby team members, is dating a girl named Alice. Ashly Burch, the voice of Lainey is queer and pansexual. | United States |
| 2016–present | The Loud House | February 15, 2020 | Alice | Lesbian | Lainey, one of Lynn's roller derby team members, is dating a girl named Alice. Ashly Burch, the voice of Lainey is queer and pansexual. | United States |

== 2017 ==
| Duration | Show title | Character debut date | Characters | Identity | Notes | Country |
|---|---|---|---|---|---|---|
| 2017 | Danger & Eggs | June 30, 2017 | D.D. Danger | Lesbian | D.D., the protagonist, is an imaginative thrill seeker, and her best friend, a lawful good, safety-first anthropomorphic egg named Phillip, with both experiencing a series of enjoyably chaotic adventures as "they do stuff". Show creator, Shadi Petosky described the show as about a "gender-free female lesbian child and her giant large-gamete friend," referring to D.D. Danger and Phillip, and also called D.D. a queer character "coming to terms with her sexuality". | United States |
| 2017 | Danger & Eggs | June 30, 2017 | Reina | Lesbian | She is a femme "brown-skinned energetic creative" who likes to build with her hands and is empowered by the world around her, as described by her voice actor, Jasika Nicole. She is also the best friend of one of the protagonists, DD, who she is very loving with. | United States |
| 2017 | Danger & Eggs | June 30, 2017 | Milo | Agender | In the fifth episode, the two protagonists, DD Danger and Phillip, meet Milo, who uses they/them pronouns. In the following episode, they form a band with DD and Philip named the Buck Buck Trio and play a music festival together. Tyler Ford, an agender model and speaker is the voice of Milo, said they loved that their character, is an "accurate representation" of them. | United States |
| 2017 | Hitorijime My Hero | July 8, 2017 | Masahiro Setagawa | Gay | Masahiro Setagawa is rescued by Kousuke "Bear Killer" Ohshiba, while Kousuke saves Masahiro "from the thugs plaguing his life" and says he wants to protect him, while Kensuke meets his friend from childhood, Asaya Hasekura, who later kisses Kensuke and confesses his feelings, changing his feelings going forward. | Japan |
| 2017 | Hitorijime My Hero | July 8, 2017 | Kousuke "Bear Killer" Ohshib | Gay | Masahiro Setagawa is rescued by Kousuke "Bear Killer" Ohshiba, while Kousuke saves Masahiro "from the thugs plaguing his life" and says he wants to protect him, while Kensuke meets his friend from childhood, Asaya Hasekura, who later kisses Kensuke and confesses his feelings, changing his feelings going forward. | Japan |
| 2017 | Hitorijime My Hero | July 8, 2017 | Asaya Hasekura | Gay | Masahiro Setagawa is rescued by Kousuke "Bear Killer" Ohshiba, while Kousuke saves Masahiro "from the thugs plaguing his life" and says he wants to protect him, while Kensuke meets his friend from childhood, Asaya Hasekura, who later kisses Kensuke and confesses his feelings, changing his feelings going forward. | Japan |
| 2017 | Hitorijime My Hero | July 8, 2017 | Kensuke | Gay | Masahiro Setagawa is rescued by Kousuke "Bear Killer" Ohshiba, while Kousuke saves Masahiro "from the thugs plaguing his life" and says he wants to protect him, while Kensuke meets his friend from childhood, Asaya Hasekura, who later kisses Kensuke and confesses his feelings, changing his feelings going forward. | Japan |
| 2017 | Kakegurui ×× | July 1, 2017 | Sayaka Igarashi | Lesbian | Sayaka is only shown to be interested romantically in Kirari, explicitly stating as much. In both the manga and anime, it is revealed that Kirari returns Sayaka's affections. Kirari, in turn, has not shown romantic interest to any other character in the series, indicated in episodes like "The Woman By Her Side". | Japan |
| 2017 | Kakegurui ×× | July 8, 2017 | Kirari Momobami | Lesbian | Sayaka is only shown to be interested romantically in Kirari, explicitly stating as much. In both the manga and anime, it is revealed that Kirari returns Sayaka's affections. Kirari, in turn, has not shown romantic interest to any other character in the series, indicated in episodes like "The Woman By Her Side". | Japan |
| 2017 | Kakegurui ×× | August 12, 2017 | Midari Ikishima | Lesbian | Midari is said to be a person who is not enamored by men, and loves women. Midari states that she is searching for the perfect woman, one comparable to Kirari, saying that she only wants to be killed by a woman, as she says in the episode "Refusing Women". In the main storyline, Midari has been portrayed as being sexually attracted to Kirari and Yumeko; in spin-offs, she has expressed sexual attraction towards Ririka (actually Mary in disguise) and various other female characters. | Japan |
| 2017 | Love Tyrant | April 6, 2017 | Yuzu Kichougasaki | Bisexual | She has a crush on her half-sister, Akane Hiyama, but later in the series she develops feelings for Seiji Aino, as indicated in the show's ninth episode. | Japan |
| 2017 | NTR: Netsuzou Trap | July 5, 2017 | Yuma Okazaki | Bisexual | The story centers around two high school girls named Yuma and Hotaru who each have a boyfriend but secretly cheat with each other. Yuma cannot explain the feeling she gets around Hotaru, which eventually leads her to believe that their relationship may be more than just a friendship. In the final episode, "Why Did It Take Me This Long to Realize?", Yuma finally realizes that Hotaru has had feelings for her all along and confesses her love for her. | Japan |
| 2017 | NTR: Netsuzou Trap | July 5, 2017 | Hotaru Mizushina | Bisexual | The story centers around two high school girls named Yuma and Hotaru who each have a boyfriend but secretly cheat with each other. Yuma cannot explain the feeling she gets around Hotaru, which eventually leads her to believe that their relationship may be more than just a friendship. In the final episode, "Why Did It Take Me This Long to Realize?", Yuma finally realizes that Hotaru has had feelings for her all along and confesses her love for her. | Japan |
| 2017 | Seven Mortal Sins | April 14, 2017 | Leviathan (Envy) | Lesbian | She becomes instantly infatuated with Lucifer upon the latter's arrival in Hell and makes herself into the fallen angel's sidekick. | Japan |
| 2017 | Symphogear AXZ | July 1, 2017 | Cagliostro | Trans woman | She used to be a man who was a swindler known for his endless lies, before being granted a perfect body by Saint-Germain, becoming a trans woman, as noted in the episode "Last Resort". Cagliostro has since sworn to never lie about her feelings. | Japan |
| 2017 | Symphogear AXZ | July 1, 2017 | Prelati | Trans woman | She also used to be a man who indulged in luxury and pleasure, before being granted a perfect female body by Saint-Germain, following his defeat at her hands in the episode "Last Resort". Prelati has since sworn to become an earnest researcher, but sometimes lets her preference for fun get in the way of her work. | Japan |
| 2017–2018 | Freedom Fighters: The Ray | December 8, 2017 | Ray Terrill / The Ray | Gay | Ray, a gay superhero, and John go to a bar where Ray fails to ask a man on a date. As Ray struggles with his recent unemployment and avoids coming out to his conservative parents, the Ray from Earth-X emerges through a breach and hands the cortex off to his Earth-1 counterpart, along with his powers, before succumbing to his injuries. In Episode 3, John and Ray go back to the bar and Ray strikes up a conversation with the man, Jacob, with the latter becoming his lover. | United States |
| 2017–2018 | Freedom Fighters: The Ray | December 8, 2017 | Jacob | Gay | Ray, a gay superhero, and John go to a bar where Ray fails to ask a man on a date. As Ray struggles with his recent unemployment and avoids coming out to his conservative parents, the Ray from Earth-X emerges through a breach and hands the cortex off to his Earth-1 counterpart, along with his powers, before succumbing to his injuries. In Episode 3, John and Ray go back to the bar and Ray strikes up a conversation with the man, Jacob, with the latter becoming his lover. | United States |
| 2017–2018 | Freedom Fighters: The Ray | December 8, 2017 | John Trujillo / Black Condor | Gay | Ray, a gay superhero, and John go to a bar where Ray fails to ask a man on a date. As Ray struggles with his recent unemployment and avoids coming out to his conservative parents, the Ray from Earth-X emerges through a breach and hands the cortex off to his Earth-1 counterpart, along with his powers, before succumbing to his injuries. In Episode 3, John and Ray go back to the bar and Ray strikes up a conversation with the man, Jacob, with the latter becoming his lover. | United States |
| 2017–2018 | Mysticons | August 28, 2017 | Zarya Moonwolf | Lesbian | The show's creator, Sean Jara, confirmed the two as a couple, noting that only one version of the episode was created and that the show's creative team fought for a kiss, but lost even though they managed "to keep the integrity of the love story." Insider noted that queer writers were responsible for "building out an arc" between Zarya and Kitty (which fans dubbed "MoonBoon"), that one creative partner objected to the kiss, resulting in the show's creative time taking it out of the story. Jara told the publication that he fought for the romance to be retained, while the show's studio, Nelvana, confirmed the story, saying the decision was made during production of the show's second season. In a later interview, Jara said that they treated the Kitty and Zarya relationship "like all the other relationships in the show." He added that while he was nervous and aware of possible roadblocks, Matt Ferguson, the show's director, supported it. | Canada |
| 2017–2018 | Mysticons | August 28, 2017 | Kitty Boon | Lesbian | | Canada |
| 2017–2019 | OK K.O.! Let's Be Heroes | August 1, 2017 | Nick Army | Gay | Nick Army and Joff are recurring characters and a gay couple. They have a same-sex wedding in the show's final episode, "Thank You for Watching the Show". | United States |
| 2017–2019 | OK K.O.! Let's Be Heroes | August 1, 2017 | Joff | Gay | Nick Army and Joff are recurring characters and a gay couple. They have a same-sex wedding in the show's final episode, "Thank You for Watching the Show". | United States |
| 2017–2019 | OK K.O.! Let's Be Heroes | August 1, 2017 | Lord Boxman | Pansexual | He has feelings for Professor Venomous, who was his loving partner in the past and is currently his partner. Series creator Ian Jones-Quartey confirmed to a fan on Twitter that the character is pansexual and confirmed that Venomous and Boxman were married at the end of the series. | United States |
| 2017–2019 | OK K.O.! Let's Be Heroes | August 1, 2017 | Enid | Bisexual | A bisexual secret witch and ninja who is in love with Red Action. In the episode, "We Messed Up", when Enid sees Mr. Gar has a picture of KO's mom when she was younger, she eagerly asks who the babe is, and when Enid and K.O. are biking to Rad's house in "Hope This Flies", Enid's helmet has a peace sign sticker colored like the bisexual pride flag. Enid also has possible romantic feelings toward Elodie. Red Action and Enid shared a kiss at the end of the episode "Red Action 3: Grudgement Day". On October 13, 2020, Ian Jones-Quartey stated that Red Action and Enid "run a dojo together and kiss" after the end of the show. Enid is voiced by Ashly Burch who came out as queer and pansexual on July 1, 2022. | United States |
| 2017–2019 | OK K.O.! Let's Be Heroes | August 1, 2017 | Gregg | Non-binary | Gregg is a minor character in the series, usually loitering around the plaza with Red Action and Drupe. Ian Jones-Quartey confirmed them as non-binary on Twitter. | United States |
| 2017–2019 | OK K.O.! Let's Be Heroes | August 1, 2017 | Radicles "Rad" | Sexually fluid | In response to fans, Toby Jones implied that Rad's sexuality was fluid. According to his voice actor, Ian Jones-Quartey, Rad and Raymond are mutually attracted to each other, meaning that Rad is queer. | United States |
| 2017–2019 | OK K.O.! Let's Be Heroes | August 1, 2017 | Red Action | Lesbian | She is in a relationship with Enid, with their first date in the episode "Back in Red Action", becoming a more committed couple as the show progressed, even sharing a kiss in the episode "Red Action 3: Grudgement Day". In a Reddit Q&A with Ian Jones-Quartey, a fan asked about a rumor that Kali Hawk's character, Red Action, was gay, and asked the same for Enid being bisexual. Ian replied, "True and True". Yellow may also be her ex-girlfriend. On October 13, 2020, Jones-Quartey stated that Red Action and Enid "run a dojo together and kiss" after the end of the show. | United States |
| 2017–2019 | OK K.O.! Let's Be Heroes | August 2, 2017 | Bobo | Agender | On Twitter, Ian Jones-Quartey confirmed that Bobo is agender. | United States |
| 2017–2019 | OK K.O.! Let's Be Heroes | August 3, 2017 | Raymond | Gay | Raymond is one of Lord Boxman's robot henchmen/children who is flamboyant with a passion love for sports. According to Ian Jones-Quartey, Raymond and Rad are mutually attracted to each other, meaning that Raymond is gay. | United States |
| 2017–2019 | OK K.O.! Let's Be Heroes | August 17, 2017 | Professor Venomous | Bisexual | Ian Jones-Quartey confirmed that this character is bisexual, when asked by a fan, but is not non-binary. On October 13, 2020, Jones-Quartey confirmed that Venomous and Lord Boxman were married at the end of the series. | United States |
| 2017–2019 | OK K.O.! Let's Be Heroes | November 3, 2017 | The Hue Troop | LGBTQ | As Ian Jones-Quartey worded it, the entire Hue Troop are "LGBTQ characters". Lesbian character Black Strategy is voiced by Erica Mendez who is asexual in real life. | United States |
| 2017–2019 | Too Loud | July 9, 2017 | Desiree (Note: She is called "Jeffrey" for much of the series) | Trans woman | In the episode "Slumber Party Sneak-In", she plots with her sister, Sara, to dress up as a girl to go to a slumber party. The rest of the girls find this out, the console her, accepting, and deciding they like her no matter whether she is a trans girl named Desiree or as a closeted boy. In September 2019, series creator Nico Colaleo described the episode as important, arguing it was his favorite episode of the show's second season, and a "pro-transgender episode." | United States |
| 2017–2021 | Castlevania | March 5, 2020 | Striga | Lesbian | Striga and Morana are members of the Council of Sisters who are introduced in season 3. Warren Ellis noted they have been a couple for a long time. | United States |
| 2017–2021 | Castlevania | March 5, 2020 | Morana | Lesbian | Striga and Morana are members of the Council of Sisters who are introduced in season 3. Warren Ellis noted they have been a couple for a long time. | United States |
| 2017–2021 | Castlevania | March 5, 2020 | Taka | Gay | Taka is a young Japanese man introduced in the third-season episode "The Reparation of My Heart", and near the season-finale, he and Sumi have sex with Alucard. After that, they betray Alucard and try to kill him, who in self-defense ended killing both. The series does not show nor mentions if he felt attracted by any woman before dying. | United States |
| 2017–2021 | DuckTales | March 9, 2019 | Lieutenant Penumbra | Lesbian | In the season 3 episode "They Put a Moonlander on the Earth!", Penumbra goes out for coffee with Launchpad McQuack but tells him that she is not interested in him because she "doesn't want to date an Earth... male". This reveals that she is a lesbian alien, according to Samantha King, a writer for the episode. King wished it had been more overt and said that people should continue to ask for better representation. | United States |
| 2017–2021 | DuckTales | April 4, 2020 | Indy Sabrewing | Gay | Debuted in the season 3 episode "Challenge of the Senior Junior Woodchucks!" Indy and Ty are the guardians of Violet Sabrewing and the foster fathers of Lena De Spell and are semi-recurring characters in the show. The characters had no dialogue throughout the series. | United States |
| 2017–2021 | DuckTales | April 4, 2020 | Ty Sabrewing | Gay | Debuted in the season 3 episode "Challenge of the Senior Junior Woodchucks!" Indy and Ty are the guardians of Violet Sabrewing and the foster fathers of Lena De Spell and are semi-recurring characters in the show. The characters had no dialogue throughout the series. | United States |
| 2017–2021 | Miss Kobayashi's Dragon Maid | January 11, 2017 | Tohru | Lesbian | Tohru falls in love with Kobayashi after she saved her and starts living in her flat as a maid. Tohru and Kobayashi's relationship is described as a 'mundane family type' one while taking care of the young dragon Kanna. While the show is somewhat ambiguous with Kobayashi's side of feelings, the manga continuation confirmed that Kobayashi began returning Tohru's feelings in a more romantic nature and by Ch. 97, she finally admits to Tohru that she has feelings for her. | Japan |
| 2017–2022 | Pete the Cat | December 26, 2017 | Sam | Gay | Sally Squirrel's fathers who first appeared in the New Years' special. They are voiced by gay actors Jim Parsons and Jesse Tyler Ferguson. | United States |
| 2017–2022 | Pete the Cat | December 26, 2017 | Syd | Gay | Sally Squirrel's fathers who first appeared in the New Years' special. They are voiced by gay actors Jim Parsons and Jesse Tyler Ferguson. | United States |
| 2017–2025 | Big Mouth | September 29, 2017 | Jessi Glaser | Unlabeled | Jessi Glaser has been attracted to boys for the first four seasons. In the fifth season, it is revealed she is also attracted to girls just like her mother as she has a same-sex crush on Ali. However, she does not seek a label. | United States |
| 2017–2025 | Big Mouth | September 29, 2017 | Jay Bilzerian | Bisexual | He has shown various moments of being sexually attracted to women as well as Matthew, even sharing a kiss with one another after Jay stated the phrase, "Hey, man, a mouth's a mouth". | United States |
| 2017–2025 | Big Mouth | September 29, 2017 | Shannon Glaser | Queer | Shannon Glaser is the mother of Jessi Glaser. She cheated on her husband with another woman which resulted in a divorce. The relationship ended in season 3. | United States |
| 2017–2025 | Big Mouth | September 29, 2017 | Dina Reznick | Lesbian | Dina is a recurring character in the show and was Shannon's love interest until she dumped Shannon in the season 3 episode "How To Have an Orgasm" so that she could be single again. | United States |
| 2017–2025 | Big Mouth | September 29, 2017 | Matthew MacDell | Gay | Matthew is a flamboyantly gay student with a love of drama and spreading gossip. Aiden is Matthew's boyfriend (voiced by Zachary Quinto) introduced in the Valentine's Day special, "My Furry Valentine". In one episode, "Smooch or Share", he kissed Jay Bilzerian, one of the series protagonists, during a game. They have a falling out at the end of season 4. | United States |
| 2017–2025 | Big Mouth | February 8, 2019 | Aiden | Gay | Matthew is a flamboyantly gay student with a love of drama and spreading gossip. Aiden is Matthew's boyfriend (voiced by Zachary Quinto) introduced in the Valentine's Day special, "My Furry Valentine". In one episode, "Smooch or Share", he kissed Jay Bilzerian, one of the series protagonists, during a game. They have a falling out at the end of season 4. | United States |
| 2017–2025 | Big Mouth | October 4, 2019 | Ali | Pansexual | Ali gives a lesson in what pansexual means, which some says "oversimplifies the relationship between private parts and gender identity," although her existence as a character has been praised as putting Big Mouth "ahead of most television representations of sexual expression." | United States |
| 2017–2025 | Big Mouth | December 5, 2020 | Natalie el-Koury | Trans woman | In the first episode of the show's fourth season, Natalie, a Lebanese-American trans female teenager is introduced. The episode she debuts in highlights "various, popular transphobic arguments", while giving her a supportive friend named Jessi, and another named Seth, who rejects her identity, who she rejects. She also appears in Human Resources. | United States |
| 2017–2025 | Big Mouth | December 5, 2020 | Lena Foreman | Lesbian | The September 11 attacks special "A Very Special 9/11 Episode" shows Lena being in a relationship with her white girlfriend Nadia as she starts acting all nice and sweet with her when she shows up. She is voiced by lesbian actress Lena Waithe. | United States |
| 2017–2025 | Big Mouth | October 28, 2022 | Elijah | Asexual | In the sixth season, Elijah is introduced as an asexual religious African-American kid who Missy is in love with. | United States |

== 2018 ==
| Duration | Show title | Character debut date | Characters | Identity | Notes | Country |
|---|---|---|---|---|---|---|
| 2018 | Banana Fish | July 5, 2018 | Ash Lynx | Bisexual | Ash has slept with men and women during his time as a prostitute. He mainly has sex with men, while dealing with childhood trauma from molestation. he admitted in one episode that he had a relationship with a girl who was killed "under suspicion of being his girlfriend." | Japan |
| 2018 | Bloom into You | October 5, 2018 | Riko Hakozaki | Lesbian | Riko is in a romantic relationship with Miyako Kodama, as confirmed in Episode 7. | Japan |
| 2018 | Bloom into You | October 5, 2018 | Miyako Kodama | Lesbian | Riko Hakozaki is her girlfriend as confirmed in Episode 7. | Japan |
| 2018 | Bloom into You | October 5, 2018 | Yuu Koito | Lesbian | Yuu Koito is a girl who loves shoujo manga and hopes to encounter a confession but when she finally does, feels nothing and does not respond. She soon becomes friends with Touko who also has received confessions but felt nothing from them, but later confesses to her. | Japan |
| 2018 | Bloom into You | October 5, 2018 | Touko Nanami | Lesbian | At first, Touko doesn't reciprocate Yuu Koito's feelings for her, but she later confesses to her, reciprocating her feelings. and she is shown reciprocating. | Japan |
| 2018 | Bloom into You | October 5, 2018 | Sayaka Saeki | Lesbian | Sayaka is Nanami's best friend from first grade and she had a crush on her. In one episode, Sayaka recalls how she dated a girl in middle school, only to find that she was not taking it seriously, after which she fell for Touko. In the following episode, she has a brief run-in with her ex-girlfriend, managing to say her piece to her. | Japan |
| 2018 | Citrus | January 6, 2018 | Yuzu Aihara | Lesbian | Yuzu is a self-proclaimed gyaru who becomes Mei Aihara's older stepsister, and had never dated. Mei is the beautiful and serious Student Council President who is stern, cold and composed, but has a short temper, and appears deadpan. Mei was briefly the fiancé of her male homeroom teacher, until Episode 2. At first, Yuzu dislikes Mei, due to her aloof and manipulative attitude, but later Yuzu resented her after kissing her, and tries to understand her attraction to Mei. While the two of them have had very intimate moments with each other, for a time Yuzu thought it would be in Mei's best interests if she did not pursue her romantically, feeling that Mei needed a sister more than she needed a lover. However, she grows to love her, eventually admitting that she wanted to be with Mei. After both confessing their true feelings for each other she starts dating Mei in the show's final episode. | Japan |
| 2018 | Citrus | January 6, 2018 | Mei Aihara | Bisexual | | Japan |
| 2018 | Citrus | January 27, 2018 | Himeko Momokino | Lesbian | Himeko is the Student Council vice-president and Mei's childhood friend and current right hand. She is in love with Mei and is very possessive of her, becoming jealous when Yuzu enters her life. | Japan |
| 2018 | Citrus | February 17, 2018 | Matsuri Mizusawa | Lesbian | She is Yuzu's childhood friend who lived close to her before she moved to the Aihara residence, and a second-year in middle school. Upon visiting Yuzu, she reveals that she has feelings for her and tries swaying her away from Mei, who she considers her rival. Like Mei, she tends to be manipulative. | Japan |
| 2018 | Citrus | March 10, 2018 | Sara Tachibana | Bisexual or Pansexual | She confesses to Mei she loves her, but also tells Yuzu that she does not care about the gender of the person she falls in love with. | Japan |
| 2018 | Comic Girls | April 5, 2018 | Koyume Koizuka | Lesbian | She has a crush on Tsubasa Katsuki, liking both her "masculine" and "feminine" sides. Koyume never knew the feeling of love before meeting Tsubasa and was unable to draw male characters until she started basing them on her. In episode 5, Ruki Irokawa finds out about Koyume's crush and convinces her to go on a date with Tsubasa and Koyumi plans to confess to her, but does not do so. In later episodes of the series, she expresses her attractions, sometimes in perverted ways. | Japan |
| 2018 | Cutie Honey Universe | April 8, 2018 | Naoko Sukeban | Lesbian | Despite her rough looks and personality, she has a crush on Cutie Honey and is, as a result, quite jealous of Natsuko "Nat-chan" Aki, Honey's friend. During Panther Claw's assault on Saint Chapel, in revenge for the death of her entire gang and to protect Honey, she intercepts a deadly attack by Snake Panther and covers Honey and Natsuko's escape, apparently at the cost of her own life. However, thanks to her toughness she returns to take part in the final fight to Sister Jill, and later joins Honey at their rebuilt school. | Japan |
| 2018 | Dakaichi: I'm Being Harassed By the Sexiest Man of the Year | October 5, 2018 | Takato Saijou | Gay | Takato, an experienced actor, loses the "World's Sexiest Man" title to a new, and rising actor, named Junta Azumaya, both in "the center of a scandal" in this anime, based on a yaoi manga series of the same name. Soon Junta confesses that he has strong romantic feelings for Takato and coerces him into a sexual relationship against Takato's will. Despite this, Takato finds himself moved by Junta's actions and persistence and has since established a genuine romantic relationship with him. | Japan |
| 2018 | Dakaichi: I'm Being Harassed By the Sexiest Man of the Year | October 5, 2018 | Junta Azuyama | Bisexual | Takato, an experienced actor, loses the "World's Sexiest Man" title to a new, and rising actor, named Junta Azumaya, both in "the center of a scandal" in this anime, based on a yaoi manga series of the same name. Soon Junta confesses that he has strong romantic feelings for Takato and coerces him into a sexual relationship against Takato's will. Despite this, Takato finds himself moved by Junta's actions and persistence and has since established a genuine romantic relationship with him. | Japan |
| 2018 | Devilman Crybaby | January 5, 2018 | Ryo Asuka (Satan) | Intersex | Ryo Asuka is a genderless angel who is Akira Fudo's best friend, while Akira is the protagonist. Akira was the first person to show him kindness, causing him to become deeply attached. Near the end, Ryo remembers he is Satan, an intersex fallen angel who fell out of favor with God when he challenged God's authority for killing the demons and replacing them with humans. Satan set out to start a war between humans and demons and was reborn as a male. He fell in love with Akira and subconsciously had him turned into a devilman (a demon human hybrid) to ensure he would survive the war and be by his side. By the end of the series, Satan realizes he loves Akira despite having previously believed love did not exist and cries and mourns Akira's death. Akira is in a relationship with a woman, but his feelings towards Ryo have been described as homoerotic. | Japan |
| 2018 | Devilman Crybaby | January 5, 2018 | Ryo Asuka (Satan) | Gay | | Japan |
| 2018 | Devilman Crybaby | January 5, 2018 | Akira Fudo | Bisexual | | Japan |
| 2018 | Devilman Crybaby | January 5, 2018 | Moyuru Koda | Gay | Moyuru is a track athlete and a devilman; Junichi is his boyfriend. As they have sex, Moyuru turns into a demon and kills Junichi, much to his grief. | Japan |
| 2018 | Devilman Crybaby | January 5, 2018 | Junichi | Gay | Moyuru is a track athlete and a devilman; Junichi is his boyfriend. As they have sex, Moyuru turns into a demon and kills Junichi, much to his grief. | Japan |
| 2018 | Crossing Time | April 9, 2018 | Tomo | Lesbian | During Episode 1, Tomo confessed her love for her best friend, Ai after having brief discussions about love interests. Ai is left confused but Tomo ensures her that she should take her time when responding to her confession. In Episode 12, Ai is still unsure on how she should respond, often viewing the atmosphere and place as "ruining the mood". Tomo then starts to have doubts and regrets about her confession to Ai and hence, tries to inform Ai otherwise. However, Ai refrains her from doing so and states that she should give her some time to think and that no matter who confesses to her, she would still feel the same way. As the train passes by, Tomo expresses her love for her once again much to Ai's embarrassment. | Japan |
| 2018 | Happy Sugar Life | July 14, 2018 | Satō Matsuzaka | Bisexual or Pansexual | Satō is depicted as a person who has no prejudices in sexual preferences, and her only canonical love interest is the girl Shio. And although the sexual part of their relationship is still questionable, including at the end of Episode 10 where Satō and Shio share an on-screen kiss after their wedding vows, the manga repeatedly emphasizes the romantic basis of Satō's feelings. At the same time, the nature of Shio's feelings remains partially ambiguous. The anime ends with Shio implying she could adopt Satō's way of life and her view on love. | Japan |
| 2018 | Happy Sugar Life | July 14, 2018 | Shio Kōbe | Lesbian or Pansexual | | Japan |
| 2018 | Happy Sugar Life | August 4, 2018 | Sumire Miyazaki | Lesbian | Sumire reveals that she has a crush on Satō while blushing over sniffing Satō's work uniform at the end of the show's fourth episode. In the following episode, she confesses to Satō about her obsession with her and wanting to be more closer to her, with Satō seeing this as a threat, so she kisses Sumire and tells her she loves her, so Sumiri will not pry into her life any further. During Episode 11, Sumire is seen somewhat helping Satō in disposing evidence of Shouko's murder, seeing this as a way to spend time with Satō. | Japan |
| 2018 | Magical Girl Ore | March 25, 2018 | Sakuyo Mikage | Lesbian or Pansexual | Sakuyo fell in love with her childhood friend Saki Uno. At first she thought that she felt jealous of her brother who Saki admired. However, as they started spending more time together Sayuko discovered that her feelings for Saki were more profound, she was determined to protect her, but also to never confess. However, Sayuko was forced to come out in a situation of crisis and so she stopped hiding her attraction. Sakuyo stated at the end of the series that she would not care if Saki was a woman, man, dog or even an amoeba, so long as it would be her, she would love her. | Japan |
| 2018 | Ms. Vampire Who Lives in My Neighborhood | October 5, 2018 | Akari Amano | Lesbian | Akari meets Sophie Twilight, a vampire, in the forest, is entranced, and takes up residence at Sophie's house. | Japan |
| 2018 | Ms. Vampire Who Lives in My Neighborhood | October 5, 2018 | Sophie Twilight | Lesbian | Sophie does not like her peaceful life being disrupted by Akari's affection and is not sure how to deal with a spastic Akari. | Japan |
| 2018 | Nomad of Nowhere | March 16, 2018 | Skout | Lesbian | Skout, the show's lesbian protagonist, cares about Captain Toth, her superior, throughout the series. Series director Jordan Cwierz stated that Skout "kinda has a thing for Toth" but is also shy, with Yssa Badiola, another series director, joking they have a friendship / relationship on the show. Later, she was confirmed as a "LGBT character" by series writer Miles Luna. Trying to inspire confidence in her superior, she is often the voice of reason for Toth, who is a rule-oriented and may like Skout too, despite the fact she is occasionally dismissive, causing fissures in their relationship. | United States |
| 2018 | Our Maid is Way Too Annoying! | October 5, 2018 | Tsubame Kamoi | Lesbian | Tsubame Kamoi has displayed romantic attraction to young girls, hence why she decided to take a maid job in the household of the protagonist Misha. On numerous occasions, she has opened up about her past problems with dating girls because of her early menstruation development. She also has the desire to marry Misha when she is able to gain her approval. | Japan |
| 2018 | Our Maid is Way Too Annoying! | November 9, 2018 | Midori Ukai | Lesbian | In Episode 6, Misha encounters Midori Ukai, a former JASDF lieutenant who fell in love with Tsubame and developed a masochistic obsession with her. Although Tsubame does not return her feelings, in Episode 8 Misha states that if they got married, with Midori's riches and Tsubame's maid expertises, they would make a perfect couple. | Japan |
| 2018 | Revue Starlight | August 9, 2018 | Mahiru Tsuyuzaki | Lesbian | The anime follows the developments between an all-female cast of main characters, and it is heavily implied that Mahiru has a crush on her roommate, Karen. In episode 5, Mahiru's feelings of jealousy culminate during her clash with Karen. While they fight, Mahiru asks Karen through song if she remembers throwing "Love's Wicked Pitch" at her. At the end of the episode, Mahiru asserts to herself that she loves her. | Japan |
| 2018 | Sword Art Online Alternative Gun Gale Online | April 22, 2018 | Pitohui "Pito" | Bisexual | In episode 12, she reveals that she is Elsa Kanzaki. M/Goshi Asogi, who is her manservant and in love with her, warns Karen that Elsa goes through men and women relatively quickly. | Japan |
| 2018 | Sword Art Online Alternative Gun Gale Online | June 9, 2018 | Clarence | Bisexual | In episode 9, Clarence, a fellow GGO player, is dying and Karen demands Clarence give up her remaining magazines. Clarence demands a kiss in exchange and reveals she is female (and chose an androgynous avatar) and that she is bisexual. | Japan |
| 2018–2019 | 3Below: Tales of Arcadia | July 12, 2019 | Shannon Longhannon | Lesbian | In the episode "Asteroid Rage", just as a meteor is about to hit Earth, Shannon confesses to a girl named Connie that she has never been kissed. Connie confesses the same thing back and both of them start to kiss each other. Shannon also appears in episodes of Trollhunters and Wizards, as does Connie. | United States |
| 2018–2019 | Golden Kamuy | June 11, 2018 | Kano Ienega | Trans woman | Originally named Chikanobu Ienaga, she is a trans woman and former doctor who feeds on the flesh of her victims to become youthful and beautiful. She debuts in Episode 11 of the anime and is part of "The Abashiri Convicts". Her character has been criticized for being an "evil beauty-obsessed trans woman", the series only trans character, with one reviewer stating that her villainy "revolves around her obsession with enhancing her own body," meaning that there are "transphobic overtones to Kano's motivation". | Japan |
| 2018–2019 | {Rail Zeppelin} Grace note | December 31, 2018 | Waver Velvet | Gay | Waver, previously from Fate/Zero, is gay because he loves former Servant Iskandar, and has an obsession with seeing him again, with his regrets likely coming out of romantic feelings for Iskandar. As such, his arc is about a gay man "coming to terms with a lost love". | Japan |
| 2018–2020 | The Hollow | June 8, 2018 | Adam | Gay | One of the protagonists of the series, Adam, a Hispanic boy, is revealed to be gay in season 2. In episode 2 of that season, "Hollow Games", he comes out to Kai, another of the show's protagonists, explaining he is gay and that Mira, a female protagonist is "not his type". Prior to this, in the trailer for Season 2 the LGBT pride flag was seen in his room, and in the first episode of that season, leading some fans to speculate he was gay. In the first season, he also shown no interest in Mira when she kissed him. | Canada |
| 2018–2020 | Mo Dao Zu Shi | July 9, 2018 | Mo Xuanyu | Gay | Mo Xuanyu is an eccentric young man who faces ostracism from his family due to his homosexuality and the incestuous feelings he nurtures for his half-brother. Wei Ying is the reincarnated spirit of a deceased aristocrat, who is reborn into the body of Mo Xuanyu after being summoned by him through a self-sacrificial ritual. He falls in love with Lan Zhan, who knew him since his previous life and loved him since then. This donghua plays down the physical dimension of the men's relationship due to censorship, but the manhua is more daring in this respect. However, the two men are portrayed as living as a couple, and even raising the child together, across media. | China |
| 2018–2020 | Mo Dao Zu Shi | July 9, 2018 | Lan Zhan | Gay | | China |
| 2018–2020 | She-Ra and the Princesses of Power | November 13, 2018 | Adora | Lesbian | Adora and Catra were childhood friends turned enemies. Throughout the series, there are romantic tensions between them, especially after Adora defects to the Rebellion in season one. In the show's fifth season, after Adora and her friends save Catra, in the episode "Save the Cat", from Horde Prime, Catra joins the Rebellion, beginning her redemption arc. In the series finale, "Heart Part 2", Adora and Catra confess their love toward each other and kiss, with their love saving the planet of Etheria (and the universe) from Horde Prime's destructive plan, peace reigning over the universe. In the aftermath, Adora and Catra become a couple. According to series creator ND Stevenson, this romantic arc, known as "Catradora" by fans, was planned since the beginning of the series. | United States |
| 2018–2020 | She-Ra and the Princesses of Power | November 13, 2018 | Catra | Lesbian | | United States |
| 2018–2020 | She-Ra and the Princesses of Power | November 13, 2018 | Bow | Bisexual | In a Twitch stream on June 9, 2020, Lee Knox Ostertag stated that she does not believe that Bow or Glimmer are heterosexual, a sentiment that series creator ND Stevenson concurred with. In the last episode of the show's final season, "Heart Part 2", Bow and Glimmer kissed, making their relationship canon, while Adora imagines Bow and Glimmer in a long-term relationship, possibly even married. This, along with Ostertag's statement, would imply that Glimmer and Bow are bisexual. | United States |
| 2018–2020 | She-Ra and the Princesses of Power | November 13, 2018 | Glimmer | Bisexual | In a Twitch stream on June 9, 2020, Lee Knox Ostertag stated that she does not believe that Bow or Glimmer are heterosexual, a sentiment that series creator ND Stevenson concurred with. In the last episode of the show's final season, "Heart Part 2", Bow and Glimmer kissed, making their relationship canon, while Adora imagines Bow and Glimmer in a long-term relationship, possibly even married. This, along with Ostertag's statement, would imply that Glimmer and Bow are bisexual. | United States |
| 2018–2020 | She-Ra and the Princesses of Power | November 13, 2018 | Entrapta | Bisexual | Entrapta is a skilled but reckless inventor and princess of Dryl, who is one of the most knowledgeable people on First Ones' tech in Etheria. Entrapta first sees Hordak, head of the Horde, as her work partner, and reunites with him in the show's last season, with both walking off together in the show's final episode. Their relationship confirmed as canon by series creator ND Stevenson (Note: From 3:55:40 to 3:57:26 in the video, ND says, "Entrapta has a lot of robot boyfriends and girlfriends...Entrapdak is canon...The robots learn to love because of her, and that's like Hordak," while making a number of other comments about Entrapta and Hordak.) and character designer Rae Geiger. According to Stevenson, Entrapta "sees humanity in everything" and had "lots of robot boyfriends and girlfriends", along with her relationship with the ship, Darla, in "some capacity". | United States |
| 2018–2020 | She-Ra and the Princesses of Power | November 13, 2018 | Light Hope | Lesbian | Light Hope is a magical entity composed entirely of light, the guardian of The Crystal Castle, and Etherian version of the Sorceress who acts as a mentor and advisor to She-Ra in her battle against Hordak and the Horde. Mara, on the other hand, was the last She-Ra before Adora, sent to Etheria with Light Hope to study the planet's magic, later learned that Light Hope had been reprogrammed by the First Ones to fire a massive weapon at the heart of the planet. In attempting to stop the weapon from going off and hiding the planet in another dimension, she lost her life. On August 17, 2020, ND Stevenson confirmed that Light Hope and Mara were in love, a development cheered by fans and Shane Lynch, a writer and script coordinator for the show. | United States |
| 2018–2020 | She-Ra and the Princesses of Power | November 13, 2018 | Mara | Lesbian | | United States |
| 2018–2020 | She-Ra and the Princesses of Power | November 13, 2018 | Netossa | Lesbian | Netossa and Spinnerella "Spinny" are a couple and both members of the Princess Alliance by the beginning of the series, a group composed of magical girls that oppose Hordak. The show's creator and Spinnerella's voice actor, ND Stevenson confirmed that in "Mer-Mysteries" Netossa and Spinnerella were on a date and were already married. In the show's final season, Netossa and Spinnerella kiss in the episode "Save the Cat" and Netossa confirms that she and Spinnerella are married in "An Ill Wind". | United States |
| 2018–2020 | She-Ra and the Princesses of Power | November 13, 2018 | Spinnerella | Lesbian | Netossa and Spinnerella "Spinny" are a couple and both members of the Princess Alliance by the beginning of the series, a group composed of magical girls that oppose Hordak. The show's creator and Spinnerella's voice actor, ND Stevenson confirmed that in "Mer-Mysteries" Netossa and Spinnerella were on a date and were already married. In the show's final season, Netossa and Spinnerella kiss in the episode "Save the Cat" and Netossa confirms that she and Spinnerella are married in "An Ill Wind". | United States |
| 2018–2020 | She-Ra and the Princesses of Power | November 13, 2018 | Rogelio | Gay | They are childhood friends who are part of Adora's team before she defected to the Rebellion. They later defected from the Horde, with Lonnie, at the end of Season 4. While show writers originally teased at their romantic relationship, with a locker even saying "R and K" at the bottom, presumably Rogelo's locker, as shown in the episode "Moment of Truth", in the episode "Stranded", Scorpia tells Swift Wind that Kyle has a crush on Rogelio before cutting herself off. Showrunner ND Stevenson confirmed their relationship, adding that Lonnie is also part of it, implying a possible polyamorous throuple. | United States |
| 2018–2020 | She-Ra and the Princesses of Power | November 13, 2018 | Kyle | Gay | | United States |
| 2018–2020 | She-Ra and the Princesses of Power | November 13, 2018 | Scorpia | Lesbian | According to series creator ND Stevenson, the relationship between Scorpia and Perfuma is subtle, and was developed "through the course of the show". In the episode "Princess Scorpia", Scorpia's two moms are shown in a picture near her bed, holding an infant Scorpia. Character designer Rae Geiger confirmed that Perfuma was "read as a trans woman" but it was not written into the show's canon while Scorpia voice actress Lauren Ash and Catra voice actress AJ Michalka speculated that Scorpia and Catra would spend time together. | United States |
| 2018–2020 | She-Ra and the Princesses of Power | November 13, 2018 | Perfuma | Lesbian | | United States |
| 2018–2020 | She-Ra and the Princesses of Power | November 13, 2018 | Sea Hawk | Bisexual | In the episode, "In Perils of Peekablue", Sea Hawk and Mermista hide behind a bar from some people who Sea Hawk has upset by setting their ships on fire. These include Admiral Scurvy, his crew, other patrons, and Falcon, the latter who ND Stevenson confirmed as Sea Hawk's ex. In the same episode, Mermista, who is in a relationship with Sea Hawk, is implied to have an ex she is hiding from as well. Mermista also was shown to be attracted to Adora's She-Ra form as well, leading some to say she is bisexual. | United States |
| 2018–2020 | She-Ra and the Princesses of Power | November 13, 2018 | Mermista | Possibly bisexual | | United States |
| 2018–2020 | She-Ra and the Princesses of Power | May 15, 2020 | Falcon | Gay | | United States |
| 2018–2020 | She-Ra and the Princesses of Power | April 26, 2019 | George | Gay | It was revealed at New York Comic Con on October 4, 2018, by Aimee Carrero (Princess Adora / She-Ra) that main character Bow has two dads. They first appear in the season two finale, "Reunion", where it's revealed that they are historians, living in a library in the Whispering Woods. They are initially unaware that Bow has been helping in the Rebellion. They make a brief appearance in the episode "Return to the Fright Zone" in the show's final season. | United States |
| 2018–2020 | She-Ra and the Princesses of Power | April 26, 2019 | Lance | Gay | It was revealed at New York Comic Con on October 4, 2018, by Aimee Carrero (Princess Adora / She-Ra) that main character Bow has two dads. They first appear in the season two finale, "Reunion", where it's revealed that they are historians, living in a library in the Whispering Woods. They are initially unaware that Bow has been helping in the Rebellion. They make a brief appearance in the episode "Return to the Fright Zone" in the show's final season. | United States |
| 2018–2020 | She-Ra and the Princesses of Power | August 2, 2019 | Huntara | Lesbian | In her debut in the episode "Huntara", Huntara was seen flirting with a waitress in a bar, who was returning her affection before Adora inerrupted her. She also may have a crush on Adora, who may also have a crush on her, and has been described by some as butch. | United States |
| 2018–2020 | She-Ra and the Princesses of Power | November 5, 2019 | Double Trouble | Non-binary | Showrunner ND Stevenson described them at New York Comic Con 2019 as a "nonbinary shapeshifting mercenary"", who debuted in "The Valley of the Lost" episode. They are voiced by Jacob Tobia, a non-binary person. Double Trouble reappears for brief periods in the show's final season, posing as "Peekablue", a male prince. | United States |
| 2018–2020 | She-Ra and the Princesses of Power | May 15, 2020 | Jewelstar | Trans man | Jewelstar is a trans man who is voiced by a trans male actor, Alex Blue Davis. | United States |
| 2018–2020 | Star Wars Resistance | October 7, 2018 | Orka | Gay | Orka and Flix run the Office of Acquisitions on the Colossus, with Orka doing the negotiations. Justin Ridge, an executive producer for the show, said that its safe to call them a couple, adding "they're absolutely a gay couple and we're proud of that" on the Coffee With Kenobi podcast. Flix is voiced by queer actor Jim Rash. | United States |
| 2018–2020 | Star Wars Resistance | October 7, 2018 | Flix | Gay | Orka and Flix run the Office of Acquisitions on the Colossus, with Orka doing the negotiations. Justin Ridge, an executive producer for the show, said that its safe to call them a couple, adding "they're absolutely a gay couple and we're proud of that" on the Coffee With Kenobi podcast. Flix is voiced by queer actor Jim Rash. | United States |
| 2018–2021 | Chip and Potato | June 10, 2019 | Ray Razzle | Gay | A zebra family named the Razzles, Ray Razzle, his husband Roy Razzle, and their baby twins Ron and Ruby Razzle first appeared in the episode "Chip's First Piano Exam". The Razzles are Chip and Potato's neighbors who move in after the previous neighbors left. | United Kingdom |
| 2018–2021 | Chip and Potato | June 10, 2019 | Roy Razzle | Gay | A zebra family named the Razzles, Ray Razzle, his husband Roy Razzle, and their baby twins Ron and Ruby Razzle first appeared in the episode "Chip's First Piano Exam". The Razzles are Chip and Potato's neighbors who move in after the previous neighbors left. | Canada |
| 2018–2021 | Final Space | February 15, 2018 | Clarence | Bisexual | A recurring character, he has an ex-wife, several since-deceased wives, and two adopted children (Fox and Ash Graven). He also is implied to be in love with General Cataloupe and has unrequited love on Sheryl Goodspeed. Series creator Olan Rogers said that he "always saw Clarence as a Bi-Sexual. [sic]" | United States |
| 2018–2021 | Final Space | February 15, 2018 | Tribore Menendez | Possibly genderfluid | An alien who is leader of The Resistance. His species flips gender twice a year. Series creator Olan Rogers described Tribore as "narcissi-sexual" because he "loves himself a little too much." | United States |
| 2018–2021 | Final Space | June 22, 2019 | Ash Graven | Lesbian | In the eighth episode of Season 3, "Forgiveness", Ash meets a genderless being named Evra, voiced by Jasmin Savoy Brown. Evra becomes Ash's friend and helps her "take her anger out", with both sitting and watching a formation of lights like the aurora borealis together. Her relationship with Evra makes clear her sexual orientation, in addition to being angry at a man named Jordan Hammerstein, in the episode "Arachnitects", for rejecting her at prom. Rogers said in a podcast about the episode "Forgiveness" that David Sacks, who wrote the episode, came from a place of "two souls connecting to each other" and noted if the show had a fourth season, they would have expanded on the relationship between Evra and Ash. However, the series was not renewed for a fourth season. | United States |
| 2018–2021 | Transformers: Cyberverse | November 2, 2018 | Acid Storm | Non-binary | Acid Storm is a Seeker and member of the Decepticons. While initially conceived as male, in the series itself, despite Acid Storm having a female voice actress, the character has often switched back and forth between "male" and "female" Seeker models in episodes 14, 15, 16, and 17. Commenting on this, writer Mae Catt said this was just something Acid Storm liked to do. Acid Storm is voiced by Jaime Lamchick who is genderqueer and bisexual. | United States |
| 2018–2021 | Zombie Land Saga | October 4, 2018 | Lily Hoshikawa | Trans woman | Lily is a prodigious transgender child actress. She died from a heart attack caused by occupational stress and mental shock upon growing facial hair. Lily does not seemed displeased at the idea of being a zombie, because to her it means that she can be a child forever, preventing her from further experiencing the anxiety and gender dysphoria, as a trans girl, that previously ended her life. | Japan |
| 2018–2022 | Paradise PD | August 30, 2018 | Stanley Hopson | Bisexual | Hopson is an elderly police officer who often gets out-of-the-ordinary assignments from Chief Crawford. | United States |
| 2018–2023 | Disenchantment | August 17, 2018 | Princess Bean | Bisexual | Princess Bean has shown attraction to both men and women. In the season 3 episode "Last Splash", she shares a same-sex kiss with the mermaid Mora. Mora is helpful in getting Bean to Steamland. In the previous season, Bean was shown to enjoy "the company of mermaids". They become a couple in later seasons. Earlier in the series, Elfo, a male elf, was Bean's love interest. As such, some critics have said that Bean is either bisexual or pansexual. On January 26, 2021, Bean was confirmed to be bisexual on the official Netflix Geeked Twitter account, while she is standing in front of a bisexual pride flag. | United States |
| 2018–2023 | Disenchantment | August 17, 2018 | Odval | Gay | It's hinted that Odval and Sorcerio are secretly in a relationship, in the Castle Party Massacre episode, as they secretly host a magic and sex cult when King Zøg is away. IndieWire reviewer Michael Schneider wrote that Sorcerio and Odval have been "a couple for a long time". Odval and Sorcerio get married in the series finale. | United States |
| 2018–2023 | Disenchantment | August 17, 2018 | Sorcerio | Gay | It's hinted that Odval and Sorcerio are secretly in a relationship, in the Castle Party Massacre episode, as they secretly host a magic and sex cult when King Zøg is away. IndieWire reviewer Michael Schneider wrote that Sorcerio and Odval have been "a couple for a long time". Odval and Sorcerio get married in the series finale. | United States |
| 2018–2023 | Disenchantment | January 15, 2021 | Mora | Lesbian | Mora is a mermaid. Mora is helpful in getting Bean to Steamland. She and Bean shared a same-sex kiss. She returns in Part 4. | United States |
| 2018–2023 | Summer Camp Island | July 7, 2018 | Puddle | Non-binary | Puddle is an alien who uses they/them pronouns and their husband, Alien King, is the king of their planet. | United States |
| 2018–2023 | Summer Camp Island | July 7, 2018 | Alien King | Genderqueer | Puddle is an alien who uses they/them pronouns and their husband, Alien King, is the king of their planet. | United States |
| 2018–2024 | The Dragon Prince | September 14, 2018 | Runaan | Gay | In the third season, it is revealed that Runaan, the leader of the assassins and father figure to Rayla, is married to a male elf named Ethari. | United States |
| 2018–2024 | The Dragon Prince | September 14, 2018 | Ethari | Gay | In the third season, it is revealed that Runaan, the leader of the assassins and father figure to Rayla, is married to a male elf named Ethari. | United States |
| 2018–2024 | The Dragon Prince | September 14, 2018 | Amaya | Lesbian | Amaya is the deaf maternal aunt of Callum and Ezran who communicates in sign language, and commander of a Katolian outpost at the Breach. Janai is a Sunfire Elf warrior and the younger sister of their queen Khessa. On February 28, 2020, Devon Giehl, lead writer of The Dragon Prince, said that the writers intended for the romantic interest between Amaya and Janai to start at the end of season 3, and explicitly confirmed them as lesbian characters who like each other. In the season four premiere "Rebirthday", Janai proposes to Amaya through slightly incorrect sign language. Amaya and Janai get married in season 6. | United States |
| 2018–2024 | The Dragon Prince | November 22, 2019 | Janai | Lesbian | | United States |
| 2018–2024 | The Dragon Prince | November 22, 2019 | Kazi | Non-binary | After the release of the third season, the official Dragon Prince Twitter account revealed that Kazi, the Sunfire Elf sign language interpreter, goes by they/them pronouns. | United States |
| 2018–2024 | The Dragon Prince | November 3, 2022 | Terrestrius "Terry" | Trans man | Terry is Claudia's former Earthblood elf boyfriend. Terry is also a trans man. Terry is voiced by transgender actor Benjamin Callins. | United States |
| 2018–2024 | The Dragon Prince | July 26, 2024 | Astrid | Trans woman | Astrid is a Celestial elf. Astrid is also a trans woman. Astrid is voiced by transgender actress Boone Williams. | United States |
| 2018–2025 | Craig of the Creek | March 30, 2018 | Kelsey Pokoly | Lesbian | Kelsey is one of Craig's best friends. Throughout the series, it was hinted she is into girls. The season four episode "Fire and Ice" focuses on her relationship with Stacks. She confesses her love to Stacks. | United States |
| 2018–2025 | Craig of the Creek | March 31, 2018 | Isabella "Stacks" Alvarado | Lesbian | Stacks is a girl who hangs out at the library and does book reports for other kids. She is implied to have feelings for Kelsey. The season four episode "Fire and Ice" focuses on their relationship and she confesses her love to Kelsey. | United States |
| 2018–2025 | Craig of the Creek | April 6, 2018 | Laura Mercer | Lesbian | J.P.'s lesbian older sister who is a nurse and also appears to help care for the family. She has also been shown to be a body-positive person, referring to J.P.'s body as "beautiful" on more than one occasion. In "Jextra Perrestrial" she is shown to be in a same-sex relationship with a girl named Kat. Laura is voiced by a lesbian comedian, Fortune Feimster. | United States |
| 2018–2025 | Craig of the Creek | April 16, 2018 | Tabitha | Lesbian | In their debut episode "The Curse", Tabitha refuses to go college and wants to spend a few times with Courtney, making Courtney blushed and they're holding hands in the end. In "The Haunted Dollhouse", they have feelings for each other, and they kissed in the end. | United States |
| 2018–2025 | Craig of the Creek | April 16, 2018 | Courtney | Lesbian | In their debut episode "The Curse", Tabitha refuses to go college and wants to spend a few times with Courtney, making Courtney blushed and they're holding hands in the end. In "The Haunted Dollhouse", they have feelings for each other, and they kissed in the end. | United States |
| 2018–2025 | Craig of the Creek | July 9, 2018 | George | Gay | George is the sole male member of the Tea Timers. In the episode "Silver Fist Returns", George is revealed to be gay when he reciprocates the Secret Keeper's feelings for him. | United States |
| 2018–2025 | Craig of the Creek | November 5, 2018 | Kat | Lesbian | Kat is in a same-sex relationship with Laura. | United States |
| 2018–2025 | Craig of the Creek | November 8, 2018 | Raj | Gay | Raj and Shawn are Honeysuckle Rangers from a neighborhood nearby. They have feelings for each other which was confirmed in the season 4 episode "Creek Talent Extravaganza". Raj and Shawn were featured in a Valentines Day-themed compilation video that was uploaded on the Cartoon Network YouTube channel in February 2022. Raj is voiced by a gay actor, Parvesh Cheena. | United States |
| 2018–2025 | Craig of the Creek | November 8, 2018 | Shawn | Gay | Raj and Shawn are Honeysuckle Rangers from a neighborhood nearby. They have feelings for each other which was confirmed in the season 4 episode "Creek Talent Extravaganza". Raj and Shawn were featured in a Valentines Day-themed compilation video that was uploaded on the Cartoon Network YouTube channel in February 2022. Raj is voiced by a gay actor, Parvesh Cheena. | United States |
| 2018–2025 | Craig of the Creek | August 3, 2019 | Jasmine Williams | Possibly lesbian | In the episode "Cousin of the Creek", Jasmine tells her cousin "I'm texting my girlfriend, mind your business." This means she may be a lesbian. | United States |
| 2018–2025 | Craig of the Creek | December 16, 2019 | Angel José | Agender | One of the characters, Angel, is non-binary and uses they/them pronouns. They were originally voiced by Angel Lorenzana who is a storyboard artist and writer for the show, who identifies as agender and uses the same pronouns. From seasons 4 to 6, they are voiced by queer transgender actress Miss Benny. | United States |
| 2018–2025 | Craig of the Creek | April 23, 2018 | Ben "Secret Keeper" | Gay | Secret Keeper is a gender non-conforming boy who collects the Creek Kids' secrets and has them written down in soda bottles. In the episode "Silver Fist Returns", it is revealed he has a crush on the Tea Timer member George. Secret Keeper is voiced by gay non-binary actor Cole Escola. | United States |
| 2018–present | 16 Hudson | August 21, 2018 | Paul | Gay | Main character Luc is adopted by Paul and Bayani, making 16 Hudson the first preschool show to feature a main character with two dads. | Canada |
| 2018–present | 16 Hudson | August 21, 2018 | Bayani | Gay | Main character Luc is adopted by Paul and Bayani, making 16 Hudson the first preschool show to feature a main character with two dads. | Canada |
| 2018–present | Big City Greens | June 27, 2018 | Alexander | Gay | On Tumblr, series creator Chris Houghton confirmed that Alexander and Terry are a couple, although protagonist Cricket Green does not seem to realize that they are gay throughout the series. Alexander is loud, rather effeminate and bossy, and Terry is silent and an introvert. They both appear to be hanging out each other in a few episodes such as in "Gridlocked", "Fill Bill", "Barry Cuda", and "Trailer Trouble". They are shown to be living together in the episode "Spaghetti Theory". Alexander is voiced by John Early, a gay actor. | United States |
| 2018–present | Big City Greens | June 27, 2018 | Terry | Gay | | United States |

== 2019 ==
| Duration | Show title | Character debut date | Characters | Identity | Notes | Country |
|---|---|---|---|---|---|---|
| 2019 | Astra Lost in Space | July 3, 2019 | Luca Esposito | Intersex | Luca is an artist and talented engineer on board the Astra. He was raised as and mostly identifies as a boy, and comes out as intersex halfway through the story, in the episode "Secret", not considering himself a man or a woman. His characteristics imply he most likely has Klinefelter's or a milder type of Androgen insensitivity syndrome, and was described by Michele Liu of Anime News Network as "unique" since Luca is a main character which is born intersex rather than "altered by sci-fi space diseases or external influence," with Liu also describing Luca as bisexual. | Japan |
| 2019 | Carole & Tuesday | April 10, 2019 | Dahlia | Ambiguous | Agent and parent of 16-year-old Angela, a famous model. Dahlia is of indeterminate gender due to the influence of the Martian environment as shown in the fifth episode. They display characteristics of both sexes. | Japan |
| 2019 | Carole & Tuesday | April 10, 2019 | Desmond | Ambiguous | Highly respected and solitary artist who is "androgynous", saying this is the case because of the radiation that falls on Mars, noting they were "originally a man but am turning into a woman," feeling emotionally as a man and woman at the same time. | Japan |
| 2019 | Carole & Tuesday | May 1, 2019 | Marie | Bisexual | Marie used to date Gus, but now is in a relationship with Anne, and the two plan to get married soon, as shown in episode 4. | Japan |
| 2019 | Carole & Tuesday | May 1, 2019 | Anne | Bisexual | Marie used to date Gus, but now is in a relationship with Anne, and the two plan to get married soon, as shown in episode 4. | Japan |
| 2019 | Epithet Erased | November 22, 2019 | Molly Blundeff | Asexual | According to Epithet's Twitter page, Molly is asexual and knows she is on the ace spectrum. | United States |
| 2019 | Epithet Erased | November 22, 2019 | Giovanni Potage | Bisexual | Epithet's creator, Brendan Blaber, confirmed on JelloApocalypse's Tumblr page that Giovanni is bisexual. | United States |
| 2019 | Epithet Erased | December 6, 2019 | Percival King | Asexual | Brendan Blaber confirmed that Percival King was written as asexual and may also be aromantic. | United States |
| 2019 | Epithet Erased | January 3, 2020 | Phoenica Fleecity | Bisexual | Phoenica was confirmed on Twitter as bisexual, as she was shown holding a bisexual flag on one tweet. | United States |
| 2019 | Epithet Erased | January 3, 2020 | Trixie Roughouse | Non-binary | Trixie was confirmed to be non-binary and uses she/her, he/him and they/them pronouns. Brendan also believes they are pansexual on one of JelloApocalypse's Tumblr post. | United States |
| 2019 | Given | July 11, 2019 | Ritsuka Uenoyama | Gay & Bisexual | Haruki Nakayama is a 22-year-old graduate student and the band's bassist and bandleader. He has a longstanding crush on Akihiko as shown in the episode "The Reason". Akihiko is a 20-year-old music student and band drummer, confronts Ritsuka at one point about "his blossoming crush on their band's new vocalist," admits his own bisexuality, and acknowledges the confusing and ambiguous nature of sexuality. He lives with his ex-boyfriend Ugetsu, with whom he has a strictly physical relationship as shown in the episode "Tumbling Dice". Specifically, Haruki is shown to be gay, as is Ritsuka, Mafuyu Satō and Yūki Yoshida. | Japan |
| 2019 | Given | July 11, 2019 | Haruki Nakayama | Gay & Bisexual | | Japan |
| 2019 | Given | July 11, 2019 | Akihiko Kaiji | Gay & Bisexual | | Japan |
| 2019 | Given | July 11, 2019 | Ugetsu Murata | Gay & Bisexual | | Japan |
| 2019 | Given | July 11, 2019 | Mafuyu Satō | Gay & Bisexual | | Japan |
| 2019 | Given | July 11, 2019 | Yūki Yoshida | Gay & Bisexual | | Japan |
| 2019 | Magical Girl Spec-Ops Asuka | January 19, 2019 | Kurumi Mugen | Lesbian | She holds a strong attraction to her close friend Asuka, who saved her from severe bullying, to the point of unstable obsession. | Japan |
| 2019 | Manaria Friends | January 10, 2019 | Anne | Lesbian | This series follows the story of a human princess named Anne and a dragonborn princess named Grea, chronicling their lives as girls whose relationship grows through the series, with a "sweet, tentative romance just on the cusp of blooming." | Japan |
| 2019 | Manaria Friends | January 10, 2019 | Grea | Lesbian | This series follows the story of a human princess named Anne and a dragonborn princess named Grea, chronicling their lives as girls whose relationship grows through the series, with a "sweet, tentative romance just on the cusp of blooming." | Japan |
| 2019 | Middle School Moguls | September 15, 2019 | Wren | Non-binary | One of the professors in the show, Mogul Wren, has been stated to be non-binary. They have a big role in the episode "Mo'gul Money, Mo Problems". | United States |
| 2019 | O Maidens in Your Savage Season | July 5, 2019 | Momoko Sudō | Lesbian | Initially, she, like other girls, begins to be interested in relationships with guys, but as the story progresses, she is becoming more and more aware of her desire and interest in other girls, that the first time she perceives as a simple misunderstanding of the reasons for the girl's interest in guys. Subsequently, she begins to develop a one-sided crush on Sugawara, with both becoming friends in the series epilogue, as she realizes she is attracted to girls. | Japan |
| 2019 | Sarazanmai | April 11, 2019 | Reo | Gay | This iconic duo of cops is at odds with each other, as they "act as enforcers for a capitalistic empire" and are forbidden to show their love for each other. Their sexuality is ambiguous to the world, but they are still very in love with each other, and they finally affirm their love later in the anime. | Japan |
| 2019 | Sarazanmai | April 11, 2019 | Mabu | Gay | This iconic duo of cops is at odds with each other, as they "act as enforcers for a capitalistic empire" and are forbidden to show their love for each other. Their sexuality is ambiguous to the world, but they are still very in love with each other, and they finally affirm their love later in the anime. | Japan |
| 2019 | Stars Align | October 17, 2019 | Yū Asuka | Non-binary | Yū, formerly known as Yuta, is a kind and mild-mannered person, who Touma thinks of as nice, even though he is unaware Yu has a crush on them, as noted in the second episode. In one episode, Yu revealed that they wear women's clothing, not sure of whether they are "binary trans, x-gender, or something else entirely" and are still figuring out their gender identity, despite their mother's angry declaration that Yu is "a boy, you know. You're my son." | Japan |
| 2019 | Twelve Forever | July 29, 2019 | Galaxander | Gay | In the episode "Locals Forever", Galaxander shows a photo album to his friend, a fellow inhabitant of Endless Island, and comes across a photo and says, "Oh, that's my ex. How'd that get in there? Don't worry, I'm not in touch with him anymore." | United States |
| 2019 | Twelve Forever | July 29, 2019 | Mack | Gay | Mack and Beefhouse are a couple in the fantasy world of Endless Island. They love each other, being bulky, to talk about their feelings and oolong tea. In Episode 7, "Mack and Beefhouse Forever", their relationship is tested after The Butt Witch tries to create friction between the two. | United States |
| 2019 | Twelve Forever | July 29, 2019 | Beefhouse | Gay | Mack and Beefhouse are a couple in the fantasy world of Endless Island. They love each other, being bulky, to talk about their feelings and oolong tea. In Episode 7, "Mack and Beefhouse Forever", their relationship is tested after The Butt Witch tries to create friction between the two. | United States |
| 2019 | Twelve Forever | July 29, 2019 | Regina "Reggie" Abbott | Lesbian | Reggie has a crush on Conelly, a 13-year-old schoolmate with whom she shares the same taste in imagining and creating stories, as shown in the two-part episode, "Locked Out Forever". Due to the show's abrupt ending, Shadi Petosky, one of the executive producers, stated they will not be able to further explore that aspect of the character/relationship. Elsewhere, Petosky described Reggie as a queer character "coming to terms with her sexuality". | United States |
| 2019 | Wataten!: An Angel Flew Down to Me | January 8, 2019 | Miyako Hoshino | Lesbian | When Miyako's sister, Hinata introduces her friend Hana to her, she instantly becomes attracted to her. During the series, Miyako has been shown to be quite perverted when it especially comes to dressing up Hana or anything Hana-related, much to Hana's own dismay. From Episode 9 onward, Miyako becomes more aware of her romantic feelings towards Hana and tries acting on them. | Japan |
| 2019 | Wataten!: An Angel Flew Down to Me | February 12, 2019 | Koko Matsumoto | Lesbian | Koko is a girl who was in a club with Miyako during high school. When introduced in Episode 6, she is shown to have an obsessive crush on Miyako to the point of stalking her everywhere she goes and in everything she does. | Japan |
| 2019–2020 | Kandagawa Jet Girls | October 8, 2019 | Rin Namiki | Lesbian | Rin lives with a girl named Misa Aoi in Tokyo, where they go to college. In later episodes, they become emotionally closer to such an extent that other characters say they are flirting with each other. | Japan |
| 2019–2020 | Kandagawa Jet Girls | October 8, 2019 | Misa Aoi | Lesbian | She lives with a girl named Rin Namiki in Tokyo, going to college with her, and later flirts with Rin. After winning the Kandagawa Cup, Rin tells Misa she loves her (which other contestants say is "forward") and wishes they be "together forever," a sentiment Misa reciprocates in episode 12. In the show's OVA, Rin wants to advance their relationship further to be more romantic while Misa is embarrassed by her advances. | Japan |
| 2019–2020 | Steven Universe Future (Note: This is not an exhaustive list. As many of the characters may also be found in the Steven Universe series, additional characters that were introduced in the preceding series may be found in the page: List of animated series with LGBT characters: 2010–2014) | December 28, 2019 | Shep | Non-binary | Partner of Sadie Miller, voiced by Indya Moore who is also non-binary, transgender, uses gender neutral they/them pronouns, and is a person of color. In their episode debut in "Little Graduation", Shep helped Steven, the show's protagonist, work out his mental problems and come to his senses. | United States |
| 2019–2020 | Bug Diaries | April 12, 2019 | Mama Worm | Lesbian | Mama Worm and Moma Worm are the moms of Worm. Mama Worm is voiced by lesbian comedian, Wanda Sykes. | United States |
| 2019–2020 | Bug Diaries | April 12, 2019 | Moma Worm | Lesbian | Mama Worm and Moma Worm are the moms of Worm. Mama Worm is voiced by lesbian comedian, Wanda Sykes. | United States |
| 2019–2021 | Carmen Sandiego | January 18, 2019 | Le Chevre | Gay | With the destruction of V.I.L.E. in the end of season 4, Le Chevre (also known as Jean Paul) and El Topo (also known as Antonio) open a food truck together. When asked about this in Instagram Live interview, showrunner Duane Capizzi said that it was intentional that Le Chevre and El Topo were together, and that they were always seen as a pair, and confirmed them as a couple, saying their philosophy was to "show, and not tell." He also called them villains which are "sweet," which you "can't help but love." Additionally, an animator for the show said that they were "given explicit directions" to make Le Chevre and El Topo, in their scenes together, "romantic and intimate." | United States |
| 2019–2021 | Carmen Sandiego | January 18, 2019 | El Topo | Gay | | United States |
| 2019–2021 | Clifford the Big Red Dog | January 7, 2020 | Dr. Mulberry | Lesbian | The episode "The Big Red Tomato/Dogbot" revealed that Samantha Mulberry has two moms. Dr. Mulberry is voiced by Maggie Cassella, a lesbian actress. | United States |
| 2019–2021 | Clifford the Big Red Dog | January 7, 2020 | Rayla Mulberry | Lesbian | The episode "The Big Red Tomato/Dogbot" revealed that Samantha Mulberry has two moms. Dr. Mulberry is voiced by Maggie Cassella, a lesbian actress. | Canada |
| 2019–2021 | Fast & Furious Spy Racers | December 26, 2019 | Tiffany Benson | Lesbian | Tiffany and Wanda are the mothers of Frostee Benson and Sissy Benson. | United States |
| 2019–2021 | Fast & Furious Spy Racers | December 26, 2019 | Wanda Benson | Lesbian | Tiffany and Wanda are the mothers of Frostee Benson and Sissy Benson. | United States |
| 2019–2021 | Gen:Lock | January 26, 2019 | Val(entina) Romanyszyn | Genderfluid | In the episode "Training Daze", Val(entina) mentioned that they are genderfluid, going by the name "Val" when male-presenting and "Valentina" when female-presenting. In the episode "Together. Together," Val is revealed to be pansexual. Romanyszyn is voiced by Asia Kate Dillon, who is a pansexual and non-binary actor, and the character was written as genderfluid, but is feminine-presenting, altering their gender performance several times. | United States |
| 2019–2021 | Gen:Lock | January 26, 2019 | Val(entina) Romanyszyn | Pansexual | In the episode "Training Daze", Val(entina) mentioned that they are genderfluid, going by the name "Val" when male-presenting and "Valentina" when female-presenting. In the episode "Together. Together," Val is revealed to be pansexual. Romanyszyn is voiced by Asia Kate Dillon, who is a pansexual and non-binary actor, and the character was written as genderfluid, but is feminine-presenting, altering their gender performance several times. | United States |
| 2019–2022 | Amphibia | June 14, 2019 | Frodrick Toadstool | Gay | Toadie is the personal assistant of Frodrick Toadstool, the mayor of Wartwood Swamp. Their roles are reversed in the finale. Their sexuality was confirmed by series creator Matt Braly in a tweet. | United States |
| 2019–2022 | Amphibia | June 14, 2019 | Toadie | Gay | Toadie is the personal assistant of Frodrick Toadstool, the mayor of Wartwood Swamp. Their roles are reversed in the finale. Their sexuality was confirmed by series creator Matt Braly in a tweet. | United States |
| 2019–2022 | Amphibia | June 14, 2019 | Sasha Waybright | Bisexual | Sasha is Anne and Marcy's friend who got transported to Amphibia with them. In the series finale episode "The Hardest Thing", Sasha is shown to have a bisexual pride sticker on the interior mirror of her car. Immediately after the episode aired, series creator Matt Braly stated directly in a tweet that the character was bisexual. Sasha is voiced by bisexual actress Anna Akana. | United States |
| 2019–2022 | Amphibia | August 1, 2020 | Yunan | Lesbian | Yunan and Lady Olivia are Newtopia's general and Andrias' royal adviser respectively. The two are shown to be a romantic couple in the finale episode, "The Hardest Thing". | United States |
| 2019–2022 | Amphibia | August 15, 2020 | Lady Olivia | Lesbian | Yunan and Lady Olivia are Newtopia's general and Andrias' royal adviser respectively. The two are shown to be a romantic couple in the finale episode, "The Hardest Thing". | United States |
| 2019–2022 | Amphibia | October 30, 2021 | Ally | Pansexual | Ally and Jess together run the internet video channel "IT Gals", as shown in the episode "Fixing Frobo". In the text of their video descriptions, the pair describe themselves as "just two girlfriends", qualified with an LGBT pride flag emoji. After the characters' debut, lead color designer Andy Garner-Flexner gave further confirmation that the two were in a romantic relationship. It was additionally stated that Ally's color palette was based on the pansexual pride flag, while Jess' was based on the bisexual pride flag. | United States |
| 2019–2022 | Amphibia | October 30, 2021 | Jess | Bisexual | | United States |
| 2019–2022 | Amphibia | November 6, 2021 | Mr. X | Gay | Mr. X is a highly effeminate and enigmatic FBI agent. In the episode "All In", when X was searching his contact list on his phone, one of them says "hubby" implying that he is married and has a husband. X is voiced by gay actor and drag queen RuPaul. | United States |
| 2019–2022 | Amphibia | November 20, 2021 | Terri | Non-binary | Terri is a scientist who helped Anne Boonchuy and the Plantars. Although feminine-presenting and was referred to as a woman by Anne; in the 2022 book Marcy's Journal: A Guide to Amphibia, Terri appears to have come out as non-binary as Marcy uses gender-neutral pronouns for them. | United States |
| 2019–2022 | The Casagrandes | September 24, 2021 | Doyle Butler | Non-binary | Doyle is a non-binary kid that competed against CJ in a sign-spinning contest. They are voiced by non-binary actor Vico Ortiz. | United States |
| 2019–2022 | Tuca & Bertie | May 3, 2019 | Tuca Toucan | Pansexual | Tuca is a female anthropomorphic toucan who has shown interest in both men and women. She forms a romantic relationship with Kara, a female anthropomorphic seagull, during the second season, though the two break up. | United States |
| 2019–2022 | Tuca & Bertie | July 4, 2021 | Kara | Queer | Tuca is a female anthropomorphic toucan who has shown interest in both men and women. She forms a romantic relationship with Kara, a female anthropomorphic seagull, during the second season, though the two break up. | United States |
| 2019–2025 | The Bravest Knight | June 21, 2019 | Sir Cedric | Gay | This series tells the story of Cedric, his husband Andrew, and their adopted 10-year-old daughter, Nia, who wants to become a brave knight like Cedric. Cedric and Andrew are voiced by gay actors TR Knight and Wilson Cruz. | United States |
| 2019–2025 | The Bravest Knight | June 21, 2019 | Prince Andrew | Gay | This series tells the story of Cedric, his husband Andrew, and their adopted 10-year-old daughter, Nia, who wants to become a brave knight like Cedric. Cedric and Andrew are voiced by gay actors TR Knight and Wilson Cruz. | United States |
| 2019–2025 | Harley Quinn | November 29, 2019 | Harley Quinn | Bisexual | Harley and Ivy are best friends. After much buildup to Harley and Ivy's relationship, in the seventh episode of the show's second season, "There's No Place to Go But Down", they both kiss after Harley saves Ivy, following their escape from prison. This episode happened after the first season began a "slow burn journey of self discovery for both of the troubled yet powerful women" in the words of one reviewer. By the end of the season, they officially become a couple. Harley Quinn and Ivy appear in Kite Man: Hell Yeah!. | United States |
| 2019–2025 | Harley Quinn | November 29, 2019 | Poison Ivy | Bisexual | | United States |
| 2019–2025 | Harley Quinn | November 29, 2019 | The Riddler | Gay | The Riddler is a member of the Legion of Doom and Injustice Gang. In the third season, the Riddler is revealed to be gay and in a relationship with the Clock King. In the Valentine's Day special Harley Quinn: A Very Problematic Valentine's Day Special, the Riddler proposes to Clock King. The Riddler and the Clock King are voiced by queer actor Jim Rash and gay actor James Adomian respectively. | United States |
| 2019–2025 | Harley Quinn | May 15, 2020 | Clock King | Gay | The Riddler is a member of the Legion of Doom and Injustice Gang. In the third season, the Riddler is revealed to be gay and in a relationship with the Clock King. In the Valentine's Day special Harley Quinn: A Very Problematic Valentine's Day Special, the Riddler proposes to Clock King. The Riddler and the Clock King are voiced by queer actor Jim Rash and gay actor James Adomian respectively. | United States |
| 2019–2025 | Harley Quinn | December 6, 2019 | Bane | Bisexual | In the Valentine's Day special Harley Quinn: A Very Problematic Valentine's Day Special, Bane is revealed to be bisexual as he is attracted to actor Brett Goldstein; while also being aroused by a dominatrix. Bane is voiced by gay actor James Adomian. Bane appear in Kite Man: Hell Yeah!. | United States |
| 2019–2025 | Harley Quinn | December 13, 2019 | Clayface | Gay | Clayface, a member of Harley Quinn's villain crew, was revealed to be gay, as shown in the second episode of season 2. Clayface claimed to have met a student named Chad in Riddler University while disguised as a woman student Stephanie. At the end of the episode, he gets a text from Chad, while made clear to have shown a loving affection from the sent message. In the Valentine's Day special Harley Quinn: A Very Problematic Valentine's Day Special, he tries to hook up with an online date only to get catfished. | United States |
| 2019–2025 | Harley Quinn | April 17, 2020 | Catwoman | Queer | Catwoman is Batman's on-again-off-again love interest. In the third season, it is revealed she used to date Poison Ivy. Writer Patrick Schumacker confirmed she is not straight. | United States |
| 2019–2025 | Harley Quinn | August 10, 2023 | Tefé Holland | Non-binary | In this series, Tefé Holland is non-binary and uses they/them pronouns. Tefé is voiced by non-binary actor Vico Ortiz. | United States |
| 2019–present | Ollie & Scoops | June 10, 2019 | Ollie | Bisexual | Ollie is a human girl who talks to cats. Ollie is into boys and girls and is in a relationship with Creepy Girl. | United States |
| 2019–present | Ollie & Scoops | July 10, 2019 | Miss Bivvins | Lesbian | Miss Bivvins is Ollie's 4th-grade teacher. She is revealed to be a lesbian in the 7th episode "Tutor Suitor". | United States |
| 2019–present | Ollie & Scoops | June 29, 2022 | Claudia Grimson / Scary Girl | Queer | Ollie is currently in a relationship with Scary Girl. Scary Girl is voiced by bisexual actress Mara Wilson. | United States |

== See also ==
- List of yuri anime and manga
- List of LGBT-related films by year
- List of animated films with LGBT characters.
- LGBTQ themes in Western animation
- LGBTQ themes in anime and manga
