= OK K.O.! Let's Play Heroes =

2018 video game

- Cover art for OK K.O.! Let's Play Heroes. The artwork is done by Justin Chan.
- Developer: Capybara Games
- Publisher: Cartoon Network Games (Note: Published physically by Outright Games)
- Director: Dan Vader
- Designers: Dan Vader; Arielle Grimes
- Programmers: Dave Hill; Kenneth Yeung; Hubert Wong; Drew Grainge
- Artists: Kelly Smith; Mike Nguyen
- Writer: Dan Vader
- Composer: Doseone
- Platforms: PlayStation 4; Windows; Xbox One; Nintendo Switch
- Release: PlayStation 4, Windows, Xbox One; January 23, 2018; Nintendo Switch; November 2, 2018
- Genres: Action-adventure, beat 'em up
- Mode: Single-player

OK K.O.! Let's Play Heroes is an action-adventure beat 'em up video game developed by Capybara Games and published by Cartoon Network Games. It is based on the animated series OK K.O.! Let's Be Heroes and was released digitally on January 23, 2018 for PlayStation 4, Windows, and Xbox One, with a port to the Nintendo Switch launching physically in 2019. A physical release of the game bundled with Grumpyface Studios' Steven Universe: Save the Light for PlayStation 4, Xbox One, and Switch was released in May 2019. The game was delisted from all platforms on December 23, 2024.

== Plot ==
When Lord Boxman takes away all the levels of the heroes' pow cards, K.O. must set things right and learn at heart that he is a true hero.

== Gameplay ==
K.O. is controlled when fighting against villains. The player can use moves such as an uppercut, punch combo, low kick, etc. The player can collect their stats after defeating all enemies to earn new moves such as a charge punch, a controllable fist, and a stronger uppercut.

During combat, taking damage or dealing damage will raise a bar towards using a special ability called a Powie Zowie, which summons a specific character. Examples include Rad, who allows players to levitate and shoot beams, and Carol, who will appear and attack with her combos.

== Development ==
Ian Jones-Quartey, the creator of OK K.O., was cautious about tie-in videogames that were of poor quality, and wanted to collaborate with a game development studio that shared his passion for the material and to create a video game in tandem with the show. This approach would ensure that neither the game developers nor animators would try to imitate each other. Cartoon Network connected him and OK K.O. co-executive producer Toby Jones with Capy Games. Jones-Quartey was already familiar with Capy and was thrilled to work with them. At the start of the collaboration, they were still brainstorming and developing the show, and wanted the game to develop in the same way. On December 7, 2017, the first trailer for the game was released.

== Reception ==
Reception

Aggregate score
Aggregator	Score
Metacritic	(PS4) 69/100 (XONE) 57/100

Review scores
Publication	Score
Computer Games Magazine	6/10
Destructoid	6/10
Hardcore Gamer	3/5
Nintendo World Report	7/10
RPGamer	3/5

Upon release, OK K.O.! Let's Play Heroes received mostly positive reviews. A review by PlayStation LifeStyle remarked that the game "shows that licensed kids cartoon adaptations don't have to be mediocre, and that they can be filled with the same charm as the television shows that made them beloved in the first place.", but was criticized for its repetitive combat.
