= Nomad of Nowhere =

American animated web series

- Genre: Western; Magic; Adventure; Fantasy; Sci-fi
- Created by: Georden Whitman
- Written by: Eddy Rivas; Miles Luna; Jordan Cwierz
- Screenplay by: Jeb Kendrick
- Story by: Georden Whitman
- Directed by: Jordan Cwierz; Yssa Badiola; Paula Decanini
- Creative director: Maggie Tominey
- Voices of: Danu Uribe; Elizabeth Maxwell; Eddy Rivas; Alejandro Saab; Ryan Haywood
- Theme music composer: Benjamin Zecker
- Composer: Benjamin Zecker
- Country of origin: United States
- Original language: English
- No. of seasons: 1
- No. of episodes: 12

Production
- Executive producers: Burnie Burns; Matt Hullum
- Production location: United States
- Editor: Cole Gallian
- Running time: 10–14 minutes
- Production company: Rooster Teeth Animation

Original release
- Network: Rooster Teeth
- Release: March 16 – September 21, 2018

Nomad of Nowhere is an American animated web series released on the website of Rooster Teeth on March 16, 2018. The show, which was created by Georden Whitman, is a western-fantasy hybrid focused on a mute wanderer hunted for being capable of using magic to give life to inanimate objects.

== Premise ==
The series follows "the Nomad", a non-speaking scarecrow brought to life by magic, who can bring inanimate objects to life and wanders a Western fantasy realm ruled by the evil king El Rey while being pursued by bounty hunters and other enemies.

== Characters ==
=== Main characters ===
- The Nomad (of Nowhere) is the series namesake: a non-verbal scarecrow brought to life by magic. Although Red Manuel and Captain Toth describe him as harmful, he is kind and friendly. He can animate plants and objects, and even though Captain Toth says these are magic abilities, he does not show any abilities to use magic.
- Captain Toth (voiced by Danu Uribe) leads a group of bounty hunters named the Dandy Lions and is under the command of the forceful Don Paragon. She may have feelings for Skout, her assistant. Series creator Georden Whitman later stated that the narrative growth of Skout and Toth was his favorite part of the story.
- Skout (voiced by Elizabeth Maxwell) is the assistant of Captain Toth who carries supplies and weapons. She is thoughtful and intelligent but doesn't often understand her strength or have strong self-confidence. Although it is not known why she is loyal to Captain Toth, she clearly has feelings for her. Series director Jordan Cwierz stated that Skout "kinda has a thing for Toth" but is also shy, with Yssa Badiola, another series director, joking they have a friendship / relationship on the show. She was later confirmed as a "LGBT character" by series writer Miles Luna.
- Red Manuel (voiced by Alejandro Saab) is a self-absorbed member of Toth's unit, and is hostile toward her and Skout. He is below Toth in terms of commanding the unit but tries to compete for her position as the head of the unit.
- Don Paragon (voiced by Max Dennison) is the pompous superior officer of Red Manuel and Captain Toth, who fashions himself as the "ruler" of a land known as "the Oasis."
- El Rey (voiced by John Swasey) is the ruler of a neighboring region, Nowhere. He was reportedly corrupted through magic, leading all the users of magic to be drained of their power, while the Nomad somehow survived.

=== Supporting characters ===
- Jethro (voiced by Ryan Haywood), Santi (voiced by Eddy Rivas), and Nell (voiced by Stephen Fu) are members of Toth's unit, the Dandy Lions.

=== People of Bliss Hill ===
- Guard (voiced by César Altagracia)
- Dolores (voiced by Barbara Dunkelman)
- Sheriff (voiced by Adam Ellis)
- Null (voiced by Stephen Fu)
- Eugene (voiced by Caitlin Glass)
- Old Man (voiced by Chad James)
- Punk Teen (voiced by Richard Norman)
- Barty (voiced by Brooke Olson)
- Old Woman (voiced by Christine Stuckart)
- Soldier (voiced by Kyle Taylor)
- Deputy (voiced by Neal Werle)

=== Twindleweed Brothers Traveling Circus ===
- Bailey Twindleweed (voiced by Larry Matovina)
- Bertha (voiced by Matt Hullum), a strong woman with a beard
- Lazarus (voiced by Ricco Fajardo), a tamer of lizards
- Trixie (voiced by Anna Hullum), a "trick shooter"

=== Other characters ===
- Ranch Hand (voiced by Ian Sinclair)
- The Undertaker (voiced by Shannon McCormick)
- Oil Man\Witch Hunter (voiced by Billy B. Burson)
- Oil Man's wife (voiced by Becca Frasier)
- Big Jib (voiced by Blaine Gibson)
- Old Lady (voiced by Jen Brown)
- Bandit Leader (voiced by Lee Eddy)
- Travelers (voiced by Jordan Cwierz and Connor Pickens)
- Y'Dala Elder (voiced by Melissa Sternenberg)
- Toro (voiced by SungWon Cho)
- Melinda (voiced by Brittney Karbowski)
- Young Melina (voiced by Yssa Badiola)
- Papa (voiced by Daman Mills)
- Passenger\Bounty Hunter (voiced by Jeb Kendrick)
- Passengers (voiced by Al McClelland and Kim Newman)
- Dandy Lion Guards (voiced by Josh Ornelas, César Altagracia and Luis Vazquez)
- Bandits (voiced by Jenn Tidwell and Stephanie Ard)
- Woman (voiced by Alena Lecorchick)
- Soldier (voiced by Kyle Taylor)
- Dandy Archer (voiced by Chris Kokkinos)
- Bartender (voiced by Kent Williams)
- Dandy Lion (voiced by Todd Womack)

== Episodes ==
No.	Title	Directed by	Written by	Original release date
1	"The Dreaded Nomad"	Jordan Cwierz	Eddy Rivas	March 16, 2018
The search for The Nomad of Nowhere, said to be a user of "dark magic" continues. Captain Toth, her Dandy Lions, and Skout, her companion, are on the trail of this man. When she faces the Nomad, she is confronted with a situation that tests her unlike any before...
2	"Bliss Hill"	Jordan Cwierz	Eddy Rivas	March 23, 2018
When Skout and Toth come back to the Oasis and tell Don Paragon that the Nomad hasn't been apprehended, Red Manuel tries to impress the Don with his plan, posing another way to get the nomad. At the same time, the Nomad attempts to help a town, although it doesn't go as he planned...
3	"Trouble on Purpose"	Jordan Cwierz	Eddy Rivas	March 30, 2018
The Nomad is faced with a bounty hunter who will stop at nothing to capture him. Toth grows annoyed with her mission while the Nomad is faced with the tough choice of whether to help those who chased him out of the small town.
4	"The Twindleweed Brothers Traveling Circus"	Jordan Cwierz	Miles Luna	April 6, 2018
The Nomad comes upon a circus while Toth and Skout are also attending, as Skout wants to relax Toth, with the situation getting tense when the performers are actually armed ex-bounty hunters.
5	"The Kindness of Strangers"	Jordan Cwierz	Miles Luna	April 13, 2018
In an attempt to hide from Skout and Toth, the Nomad accepts an offer from an undertaker for passage across the desert. Unfortunately, this man has his own disturbed idea of how the Nomad should "serve" him...
6	"El Rey"	Jordan Cwierz	Jordan Cwierz and Eddy Rivas	April 20, 2018
As Skout and Toth continue to track the Nomad, even through a sandstorm, the Nomad comes upon a fort which has been long abandoned, having visions of something which happened far in the past. At the same time, Toth fights a creature which takes its power from sandstorms.
7	"Eagle Canyon"	Jordan Cwierz	Eddy Rivas	August 17, 2018
When a local governor visits Don Paragon, he is left with a hard decision. While the Nomad attempts to assist an injured creature, Skout tries to assist Toth, leading to an outcome neither wants...
8	"End of the Line"	Jordan Cwierz	Eddy Rivas	August 24, 2018
Coming upon a train station, The Nomad sneaks aboard a train, and Skout does at all, trying to get away from her problems. At the same time, Toth encounters the Champion of Toro who is also attempting to track the Nomad.
9	"Compass"	Miles Luna	Eddy Rivas	August 31, 2018
As the chase continues, Skout and the Nomad try to lose the Champion of Toro, but he seems to keep catching up to them. In order to get information, Toth engages in some unethical behavior and the Nomad has a choice of whether he should keep running from those trying to catch him.
10	"The Witch and the Knight"	Yssa Badiola	Eddy Rivas	September 7, 2018
The Nomad remembers back to a friend he loves from the past, with the memories of the experience flooding back to him.
11	"The Red Carpet"	Paula Decanini	Jordan Cwierz, Miles Luna, and Eddy Rivas	September 14, 2018
While Don Paragon boasts about the capture of the Nomad, Toth comes back to the Oasis, as does Skout, leading to an inevitable confrontation...
12	"Fiesta"	Paula Decanini and Yssa Badiola	Jordan Cwierz, Miles Luna, and Eddy Rivas	September 21, 2018
As the Nomad prepares to fight for those living in the Oasis, Don Paragon desperately tries to capture the Nomad, engaging in measures which are seen as extreme.

== Promotion, production, and release ==
On January 17, 2018, Collider published an article about the show, describing it as a "western adventure that takes cues from Samurai Jack," quoting show director Jordan Cwiecz as describing it as a "western/fantasy mash-up about a mysterious nomad traversing a western wasteland that hasn’t seen magic in 100 years," saying that people should think of it "as two-parts Samurai Jack and True Grit with just a dash of The Lord of the Rings" with humor, fun, and much more. The series had been announced as part of the Rooster Teeth animation slate, along with gen:Lock, RWBY volume 6, Red vs. Blue, Camp Camp, RWBY Chibi, and others, the same day.

In February, RoosterTeeth released a promotional video for the series. Another teaser was posted in early March.

Season 1 of Nomad of Nowhere began airing on March 16 for FIRST members, and March 23 for everyone else.

In April 2017, Jordan wrote a post announcing the mid-season break of the show and noted that the first season would have a total of 12 episodes. The first season aired its last episode on September 28, 2018.

In late March 2018, show director Jordan was interviewed by Collider, calling the series a slapdash of "a bunch of spaghetti westerns got mashed up with all your favorite fantasy series to create one epic adventure," saying the idea of the show came from Georden Whitman, a production artist for a show named Camp Camp, and was inspired by his college animation, Sir Knight of Nothing. He also said that his main source of inspiration came from live-action drama like spaghetti westerns and Deadwood, which have nostalgia and themes of despair in harsh lands with hard lives. Jordan also described the show as ambitious, challenging, and unique, allowing for an exploration of animation styles, inspired by Disney art books, Studio Ghibli, and more, calling it a show that "has the ingredients of things like Samurai Jack and Trigun while still having the legs to stand on its own pretty much sums up what we strive to do."

In May 2022, it was announced that FilmRise has acquired streaming rights for Nomad of Nowhere, Camp Camp, and Red vs. Blue, grouping episodes from each series into "traditional half-hour formats and seasons for streaming."

Apart from airing on Rooster Teeth and the Rooster Teeth animation YouTube channel, the series is on iTunes, as a movie, while the first six episodes are available on Tubi, Prime Video, and Peacock.

== Reception ==
Reviews of this series were relatively positive. In his first review of the series, Dave Trumbore of Collider called the show excellent, saying that whilst it has a Western plot, it has "more of a fun, playful feel," especially when it comes to the Nomad. In a later review, he called the series a story which brings together the Wild West, cartoonish magic, and classic 20th century cartoons, serving as a magical and adventure tale which features a "very silly collection of characters" who encounter the nomad, stating that it is "just a bit different from the rest" of the cartoons out there. Padraig Cotter of Screen Rant described the show as a "mixture of fantasy and western" with a "quirky sense of humor and blend of genres," saying it has earned a loyal fanbase, and even said that some compared it to Trigun and Samurai Jack. Tommy Williams of Geek Tyrant described the series as "very family friendly" and "lighthearted fun". Other reviewers pointed to Western genre themes, and praised Rooster Teeth for branching "into new avenues," citing the show as one example of this.

== Future ==
Although the Season 1 finale teased that the show would continue into a second season, series creator Georden Whitman, who left RT before Season 1 ended, publicly criticized RoosterTeeth, citing "creative differences" as a reason and saying he gave the show's writers "the outline of the whole story, including the ending." Responding to claims that RoosterTeeth engages in "heavy crunch periods," resists providing benefits, has work weeks which are eighty hours, and other issues, he agreed that these claims were correct.

On July 11, 2020, on an episode of the podcast Talk CRWBY to Me, Miles Luna revealed writer Kiersi Burkhart originally joined Rooster Teeth to work on Season 2 of Nomad of Nowhere and the process went "pretty far along," but production was halted when it was decided continuing the series at the time was not advisable. In a September 2020 Tumblr post, RT Animation director Jordan Cwierz explained Rooster Teeth does not cancel shows it owns, but under the company's restructuring, shows like Camp Camp now fall under the RT Studios label, meaning they are no longer produced on their own and are being shopped to partners. Cwierz added that the same applies to shows like Nomad of Nowhere, although his only comment was that they were "trying to make" more episodes.

== See also ==
- Rooster Teeth
- List of animated series with LGBT characters: 2015-2019
- History of animation
- LGBTQ themes in Western animation
