= List of OK K.O.! Let's Be Heroes characters =

The American animated series OK K.O.! Let's Be Heroes features a fictional cast created by Ian Jones-Quartey.

== Main ==
=== K.O. ===
K.O. / Kaio O. Kincaid
- OK K.O.! Let's Be Heroes character
- First appearance: "Lakewood Plaza Turbo" (2013)
- Last appearance: "Thank You for Watching the Show" (2019)
- Created by: Ian Jones-Quartey
- Voiced by: Stephanie Nadolny (pilot); Courtenay Taylor; William Bartes (singing voice)

In-universe information
- Species: Human
- Gender: Male
- Occupation: Bodega worker (formerly); Bodega manager (currently)
- Home: Carol's house

K.O. is the titular character and the main protagonist of the series. He is Carol's son and the newest employee at Gar's Bodega, which is located in Lakewood Plaza. His birthday is June 18, which is also the PIN for Carol's credit card. He is optimistic, loyal and willing to help others. Although he can be simple-minded and gullible, his friends find him reliable, and he deeply cares for them. He is also easily amazed by anything hero or weapon-related and is always looking for advice on how to be a proper hero, usually from Carol. In "Know Your Mom," K.O. believed that Carol quit being a hero when he was born, but later learns that this was not the case. The episode also shows that he did not know her name until then. K.O. has low intelligence, as for a long time he was unaware that Mr. Logic was a robot, or that Carol cooked his food, as he thought it came from the "Dinner Man". However. he occasionally showcases deductive reasoning and has been shown to be manipulative, particularly towards Darrell and Shannon. After being trapped by T.K.O in their subconscious in "Carl", K.O. accepts him as part of him in the series finale and becomes the new owner of Gar's Bodega in the epilogue.

His hero level gradually increased over the course of the series; initially starting at Level 0, he levelled up to 0.1, 1, 2, 3, 4 and then 99, attaining Level 100 in the time skip shown in the series finale. He was also Level 100 in "You're Level 100!", but this was due to a Pow Card glitch.

=== Enid Mettle ===
Enid Mettle

Voiced by: Mena Suvari (Pilot), Ashly Burch (series)
Hero Level: 5 (currently)

Enid Mettle is a teenage witch who works as a cashier at the bodega, claiming herself to be a ninja and that her werewolf father and vampire mother are a supermodel and spy, respectively. Enid is the most practical and down-to-earth of the employees, but seemingly lacks motivation in her job despite being shown to handle out-of-control situations; this is shown in the events of "We've Got Pests", where she convinced a group of partiers to grow up and discover themselves. When she was a preteen, she attended "Ghoul School", and was rather shy and insecure, being embarrassed of her family and wanting to be a ninja. After the events of "Parents Day", Enid learns to accept her family's quirks as her parents warm up to her career choice, later reconnecting with her old friends from Ghoul School. She and Red Action eventually start dating, and are shown running a dojo together in the series epilogue.

=== Radicles X ===
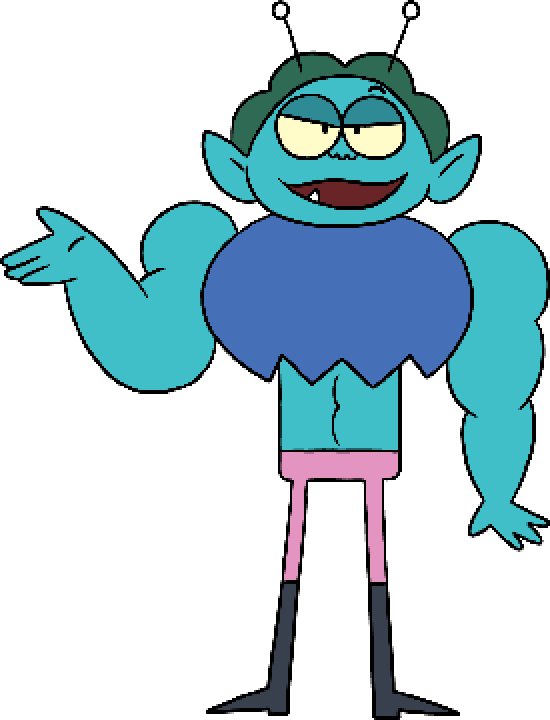
Radicles X

Voiced by: Ian Jones-Quartey
Hero Level: 4 (Currently)

Radicles X, more often known as Rad, is an alien teenager from Planet X, who also works as a shelf stocker at the bodega. Rad slacks off the most out of the trio despite claiming to be all-powerful and showing off. He boasts a tough masculine exterior, but is actually mild compared to other heroes and, as shown in "You Are Rad", possesses a softer side that he refuses to acknowledge out of fear of being embarrassed. In fact, Rad is more prone to crying than the others and is therefore much more sensitive to having his feelings hurt. In the series epilogue, Rad returns to Earth after having enlisting in the space army for some time and opens a cat cafe.

=== Mr. Gar ===
Voiced by: David Herman
Hero Level: 11

Eugene Garcia is the overseer of the plaza and owner of the bodega where K.O., Enid, and Rad work. He is tough, serious and prideful of the plaza and wishes for it not to be harmed. However, he has occasionally shown to not mind his employees slacking, as he considers it "normal". He finds it uncomfortable to be emotional around others, mainly Carol, whom he had feelings for but did not act on out of guilt. When he was younger, Mr. Gar was originally a P.O.I.N.T. member codenamed El-Bow who fell in love with his fellow recruit Carol, who was in love with their senior Laserblast. However, he was fired from P.O.I.N.T. after inadvertently distracting Carol from a stakeout which seemingly caused Laserblast's death. After some time, Mr. Gar was entrusted with the land he built the plaza on by the President of the Universe, who enlists him for several secret missions. In "T.K.O.," Mr. Gar opens up about how proud he is of K.O. while openly admitting his feelings for Carol. After a three-month time skip at the start of the second season, it is revealed that Mr. Gar and Carol have begun dating and that he has taken a father-like role to K.O.

=== Carol ===
Voiced by: Kate Flannery
Hero Level: 11

Carol is K.O.'s tough yet doting mother and the owner of "Fitness Emotions" at the plaza, which Ginger, Gladys and Gertie frequent. She usually gives K.O. advice, though it is not always clear what she is trying to teach. She is good friends with Mr. Gar, but is oblivious to his feelings for her. However, in "Seasons Change", she seems to acknowledge his feelings for her, but either seemingly does not care or knew about it all along. The episode also reveals that Carol had trained K.O. since he was an infant. When she was younger, Carol was originally a P.O.I.N.T. member code-named Silver Spark, who had feelings for the group's senior member Laserblast. His apparent death led her to initially bear a grudge against Mr. Gar for keeping her from preventing it, but later forgave him as he saved her life and knew of his crush for her. After a three-month time skip following the first season finale, she has started dating Mr. Gar and is revealed to still be a P.O.I.N.T. agent in secret, safeguarding the glorb tree under the plaza to prevent P.O.I.N.T. from intervening.

== Recurring ==
=== Lakewood Plaza Employees ===
- Ms. Mummy, voiced by Ashly Burch
- Beardo, voiced by David Herman
- Baby Teeth, voiced by Ashly Burch

==== Real Magic Skeleton and Brandon ====
Hero Level: 2

Employees at the plaza's "iFrame Outlet" frame store, which is owned by Sir eFram iFrame. Real Magic Skeleton (voiced by Ben Jones) is an idealistic living skeleton with magical powers, while Brandon (voiced by David Herman) is a laidback humanoid bear who sometimes gets on Real Magic Skeleton's nerves, yet values their friendship.

==== Dendy ====
Voiced by: Melissa Fahn
Hero Level: 3

Dendy is a kappa in the same grade as K.O., who uses technology to fight and is his best friend. In "I Am Dendy" she approaches K.O. on the pretext of needing help fixing her backpack so she could study him, but bonds with him over their shared interests and now considers him a friend. Though Dendy is aware of K.O.'s lack of tech expertise, this does not appear to phase her even when he accidentally released a virus on the plaza. She ultimately values her time with K.O. and considers him a close friend. In "You're in Control", Dendy tells K.O. that she loves him and that he is appreciated, even admitting that he has helped her in the "emotional sciences". In the series finale, Dendy becomes C.E.O. of the POW card company.

==== Mr. Logic ====
Voiced by: James Urbaniak
Hero Level: 2

Mr. Logic is a robotic hairstylist who owns the "Logic Cuts" barbershop at the plaza and is able to scan and add up everyone's hero levels. "Lad & Logic" revealed that he was originally created by Lord Boxman and helped set up Boxmore. However, Boxman's insistence to destroy the then unfinished plaza rather than robots for other villains to earn a profit convinced Mr. Logic to leave him after meeting Mr. Gar and becoming Lakewood Plaza Turbo's first worker.

==== Drupe ====
Voiced by: Melissa Villaseñor
Hero Level: 1

Drupe is a humanoid strawberry teenager who hangs out with Red Action and Gregg as one of the Cool Teens, usually making fun of others to hide her negative traits, as she is shy about her fashion blog. In the aftermath of "You're Everybody's Sidekick", after K.O. got her blog exposure, Drupe gradually loosened up and has become friendlier to K.O. and his friends. "RMS & Brandon's First Episode" reveals she is friends with A Real Magic Skeleton and Brandon. She later starts working as a coffee barista in the plaza after RMS indirectly convinced her she should do something with her life. She developed her own business following the events of "Project Ray Way".

=== P.O.I.N.T. (Powerful Operatives Investigating and Neutralizing Trouble) ===
A superhero organization that Mr. Gar and Carol were originally members of.

==== Foxtail ====
Voiced by: Melodee Spevack
Hero Level: 10+

Foxtail is the leader of P.O.I.N.T., who possesses a muscular physique and orange hair along with a fox's tail. During Mr. Gar's time as a P.O.I.N.T. member, initially appearing in flashback sequences. However, after Laserblast's apparent death, Foxtail came to run P.O.I.N.T. like a military force, as she believed power is the only way to protect everyone. She makes her first physical appearance in "Point to the Plaza", expressing disdain towards Mr. Gar and looking down on his current place in life at the Plaza.

She is the head of P.O.I.N.T. Prep's Strength House, where she shows a social Darwinist outlook in her expectations that all superheroes are not created equal and only a few are worthy, wanting custody of the glorb tree under Lakewood Plaza Turbo to empower her forces. In the second season finale, she takes over the plaza for two months before accepting defeat and retiring, appointing Elodie as her successor.

==== Doctor Greyman ====
Voiced by: Dana Snyder

Doctor Greyman is a grey alien who wears a fedora and purple scarf and is the team's scientist. He originally possessed telekinesis, but lost it to a power-draining weapon. Years later, despite being looked down on for being powerless, Greyman is the head of P.O.I.N.T. Prep's Wisdom House, where he is shown using a wheelchair. He is later revealed to be Chip's creator, who Foxtail fired from P.O.I.N.T. Prep after he refused to help her in her plans. He later returns in "Chip's Damage", convincing K.O. and Elodie to let Chip be retired.

==== Rippy Roo ====
Voiced by: Ashly Burch

Rippy Roo is a small blue kangaroo with boxing gloves who joined P.O.I.N.T. along with Carol and Mr. Gar, supposedly being accepted into the team because of her adorable nature making her like a mascot. She speaks in an animal language that P.O.I.N.T. members somehow understand. Her pouch is a wormhole that allows her to carry an insurmountable amount of objects. Following Laserblast's funeral, Rippy left PO.I.N.T. upon realizing the path its remaining members were taking. Rippy returns in "Whatever Happened to... Rippy Roo?", which reveals she became a physic scientist and secretly attempted to retrieve Laserblast as she reconnects with Carol.

==== Chip Damage ====
Voiced by: Kurt Angle
Hero Level: 10, 15 (In "Mystery Science Fair 201X")

Chip Damage is a celebrity superhero that many heroes look up to, later revealed to be an android created by Doctor Greyman following the apparent death of Laserblast. Chip first appears in "Point to the Plaza", where it is shown that he cares more for his fans than helping others. Despite his efforts, Enid and K.O. end up saving the Plaza, resulting in Chip suggesting the former join P.O.I.N.T. Prep Academy. Despite this, Chip is still technically a responsive hero who gives support to young up and comers. Foxtail later uses a remote control to modify his programming to have him secretly power up their students by imbuing them with glorbs, with Elodie and Sparko being among the students of his special class, before he is deactivated. Elodie attempts to bring back Chip in "Chip's Damage", but Dr. Greyman convinces her to retire him so the next generation of heroes can take over.

==== Professor Sunshine ====
Voiced by: Melanie Chartoff

Professor Sunshine is a living cloud person and the head of P.O.I.N.T. Prep's Charisma House. Unlike her fellow P.O.I.N.T. members, Sunshine is optimistic and supportive whenever she displays her sunlight abilities. However, she can change herself to being a cold front cloud, which she uses to search the hallways for after-hours students. In this state, she has an unforgiving demeanor.

==== Elodie ====
Voiced by: Reshma Shetty
Hero Level: 4

Elodie is a popular superhero who attends P.O.I.N.T. Prep Academy, who was initially Enid's childhood friend before betraying her during school entrances. When Elodie returns to Lakewood Plaza Turbo, she loses to Enid in an exhibition rematch. Despite Elodie's indifferent and uncaring nature towards Enid, she still considers her a friend despite hiding it and her drive to be the best. Elodie eventually makes peace with Enid during the latter's time in P.O.I.N.T. Prep, when she places Enid's life above winning their match. This ultimately results in her helping Enid expose Chip Damage, having been among those infused with glorbs. After Enid chooses to leave P.O.I.N.T. Prep, Elodie decides to stay as she feels she worked hard to get where she is and wants to make the school a better place. Elodie returns in the second-season finale "Dark Plaza" as Foxtail's right hand before being promoted as the new leader of P.O.I.N.T.

=== Other heroes ===
- Gregg, voiced by Ian Jones-Quartey
- Bell Beefer, voiced by Michael-Leon Wooley
- Mega Football Baby, voiced by Melissa Villaseñor
- Nick Army, voiced by Chris Niosi
- Joff the Shaolin Monk, voiced by James Urbaniak (originally), Johnny Wu (starting in "Be a Team")
- Punching Judy, voiced by Melissa Villaseñor
- Ted the Viking and Foxy, voiced by Michael-Leon Wooley and Ashly Burch respectively
- Neil, voiced by Chris Niosi
- Shy Ninja, voiced by Melissa Villaseñor
- Rex Th' Bunny, voiced by Robbie Daymond
- Holo-Jane, voiced by Kari Wahlgren (originally), Lola Kirke (starting in "Your World is an Illusion")
- Sparko, voiced by Ron Funches

==== Red Action ====
Voiced by: Kali Hawk
Hero Level: 5

Red Action is a cyborg teenage girl from the year 301X, who is a member of a superhero team known as the Hue Troop. She escaped to the present after accidentally shattering her team's Prism Crystal. She first appears in "You're Everybody's Sidekick", where she hangs out with Drupe and Gregg as one of the Cool Teens. She becomes less feisty after K.O. arranges for her to get a haircut from Mr. Logic; while she refuses to thank K.O. to keep her reputation, she respected him. She later befriends Enid in "Back in Red Action", where the Hue Squad find her as she acquires a past iteration of the Prism Crystal and is forgiven by her old team. Red Action leaves 201X to help her team fight off a threat in 301X in "Red Action to the Future", using a neglected Enid's actions to alter the war's duration from years to a few hours so she can enjoy her youth in the present. Red Action eventually becomes Enid's girlfriend, with them being shown running a dojo together in the series epilogue.

=== Citizens ===
- Colewort, voiced by Cole Sanchez
- Potato, voiced by Melissa Villaseñor
- Chameleon Jr., voiced by Tony Revolori
- Gladys, voiced by Stephanie Nadolny in the pilot, and Ashly Burch in the series
- Gertie, voiced by Kate Flannery in the pilot, and Melissa Villaseñor in the series
- Ginger, voiced by Mena Suvari in the pilot, and by Melissa Villaseñor, then Carol Kane in the series
- Joe Cuppa, voiced by Andres du Bouchet
- Crinkly Wrinkly, voiced by Ian-Jones Quartey, and Keith David in "Legends of Mr. Gar"
- Dynamite Watkins, Action News Anchor, voiced by Mary Elizabeth McGlynn
- Pird, voiced by Chris Niosi, Ian Jones-Quartey in "You Get Me"
- Skateboard Nerd, voiced by Parker Simmons
- Miss Quantum, voiced by Mary Elizabeth McGlynn
- Bernard, voiced by Dave Fennoy
- Wilhamena, voiced by Melique Berger
- Icky and Boris, voiced by Ashly Burch and Ian Jones-Quartey respectively
- Dogmun, voiced by "Realistic Stock Dog Bark"

== Guest heroes ==
=== Hero ===
Voiced by: Michael Sinterniklaas
Origin: RPG World
Hero Level: 90+

A mysterious hero who has been attempting to finish a quest by defeating his nemesis, Galgarion. He has spiky blonde hair and wields a big sword, making him resemble Cloud Strife. He follows RPG logic, such as grinding and overstocking on potions. After another encounter with Galgarion that ends in a draw, K.O. is fed up with their cycle and wishes to do other things. Inspired by his epiphany, Hero decides to do the same thing and returns to his girlfriend, Cherry, whom he marries and has a baby with her, named Spaghetti. He later resumes doing quests, with his family joining him on his adventures.

=== Captain Planet ===
Voiced by: David Coburn
Origin: Captain Planet and the Planeteers
Hero Level: Planet

An eco-friendly superhero summoned through the power of the five elemental rings: Earth, Wind, Fire, Water and Heart. As his name implies, he fights to protect the earth from eco-wrongdoing, including pollution, greed and crime. He is highly revered by the residents of Lakewood Plaza. He is once again called upon by the Planeteers, consisting of Kwame and the Lakewood Plaza Heroes, to battle Dr. Blight and Lord Boxman. He and Kwame had unsuccessfully attempted to stop climate change many years ago, resulting in the Planeteers except Kwame quitting. However, thanks to K.O., Enid and Rad, they reunite to create a PSA and remind people to preserve the planet, with the original Planeteers appearing in non-speaking cameos.

=== Kwame ===
Voiced by: LeVar Burton
Origin: Captain Planet and the Planeteers

Kwame is one of the five Planeteers who summons Captain Planet. He hails from Ghana and possesses the Earth ring. The other four Planeteers had given up after unsuccessfully attempting to stop eco-wrongdoing, as well as to get real jobs. With help from the Lakewood Plaza Heroes, Kwame and Captain Planet defeat Lord Boxman and Dr. Blight. The gang later creates a PSA, with the original Planeteers appearing in non-speaking cameos.

=== Grimwood Girls ===
Origin: Scooby-Doo and the Ghoul School

The Grimwood Girls were Enid's friends from before she attended Lakewood Plaza Elementary School. They are students at Miss Grimwood's Finishing School for Ghouls. Their group consisted of:

- Phantasma (voiced by Russi Taylor) - A friendly ghost girl who is the group's leader and the Phantom's daughter.
- Sibella (voiced by Susan Blu) - A feisty vampire who is Count Dracula's daughter.
- Elsa Frankenteen (voiced by Pat Musick) - A tough and slow-witted girl and the daughter of Frankenstein's monster.
- Winnie (voiced by Natalie Palamides) - A rambunctious werewolf girl and daughter of a werewolf.
- Tanis (voiced by Kristen Li) - A shy, but friendly mummy girl and daughter of a mummy.

The Grimwood Girls would hang out with Enid, who was the witch of the group. After not seeing her in years, they are seemingly unaware that she became a ninja and insist that she show off her witch powers. An enchanted tree caused by Enid's inexperience over the years eats Winnie and Tanis and proceeds to dance off with them. When Enid finally confesses that she no longer considers herself a monster like them, they admit that they knew all along she was into ninjas. After rescuing Winnie and Tanis from the enchanted tree, they dance together, knowing that they are still friends.

=== Garnet ===
Voiced by: Estelle
Origin: Steven Universe
Hero Level: Two gems

Garnet is the leader of the Crystal Gems, who was inexplicably taken from her world and ended up in Cartoon Network City. She teams up with K.O., Ben, and Raven to stop Strike and rescue the inhabitants of the multiverse. During "Crossover Nexus", Garnet forms a motherly bond with K.O. and a friendship of sorts with Ben and Raven. Initially, Strike destroys her sunglasses, which she says are prescription glasses meant to focus her future vision. Eventually, she and the team defeat Strike when K.O. retrieves his pen and returns the heroes' missing abilities. Before returning to her own world, she uses Strike's pen to create a Pow Card of herself for K.O. and offers him encouragement.

=== Ben Tennyson / Ben 10 ===
Voiced by: Tara Strong (Ben), John DiMaggio (Four Arms)
Origin: Ben 10 (2016 series) (series), Ben 10 (2005 series)

Ben Tennyson is a tween who possesses the Omnitrix, an alien watch that allows him to transform into various aliens. In "Crossover Nexus", he finds himself in Cartoon Network City along with K.O., Garnet and Raven and allies with them to battle Strike, a mysterious being who wants to destroy the Cartoon Network heroes. Strike ends up removing Ben's Omnitrix while he is still in his Four Arms mode, leaving him stuck in that form until he can get his Omnitrix back. Being rather young, he admires his own abilities above the rest of the team, but nevertheless forms a bond with them. Eventually, K.O. retrieves Strike's pen and returns Ben's Omnitrix and the other team's abilities. Ben's Omnitrix, however, allows him to transform into Cartoon Network characters, which he uses to defeat Strike and save the Cartoon Network universe. Afterward, Ben returns to his world, excited to tell his cousin Gwen and Grandpa Max about his adventure.

=== Raven ===
Voiced by: Tara Strong
Origin: Teen Titans Go! (series). DC Comics Presents #26 (October 1980)

Raven is a half-human, half-demon member of the Teen Titans. In "Crossover Nexus", she ends up in the Cartoon Network City, where Strike defeats her; however, she is not turned to stone like the others. She is rescued by K.O., Garnet and Ben, and joins their group to take down Strike. Raven, while sarcastic and cynical, takes a liking to her new friends and even compliments K.O. for being "smarter than Beast Boy". K.O. manages to get Strike's pen and return all the heroes' abilities, including Raven's magic. After defeating Strike and rescuing the other heroes, Raven uses her abilities to return K.O., Garnet and Ben home. When she tries to return home, she nearly ends up traveling to the world of Teen Titans before correcting herself at the last minute.

=== Sonic the Hedgehog ===
Voiced by: Roger Craig Smith
Origin: Sonic the Hedgehog (1991)
Hero Level: Ring

Sonic is a blue anthropomorphic hedgehog and a world-famous hero who is capable of running at supersonic speeds. Lord Boxman lures him and Tails to the bodega using a fake flyer advertising chili dogs, where he meets K.O. and is impressed by his knowledge of him, offering to make him his new "little buddy". When Darrell and Jethro kidnap Rad and Enid, he helps K.O. storm Boxmore to rescue them. He is forced to fight K.O. after one of Lord Boxman's machines transforms him into Metal K-0. After defeating him, he dives into a pool of water to return him to normal despite being unable to swim, only for Tails to save them. The trio defeat Lord Boxman before Sonic and Tails leave to return the Master Emerald, which Lord Boxman stole from Knuckles the Echidna, with Sonic urging K.O. to have chili dogs next time he visits.

=== Miles "Tails" Prower ===
Voiced by: Colleen Villard
Origin: Sonic the Hedgehog 2 (1992)

Tails is an anthropomorphic fox capable of flying using his two tails, and Sonic's best friend and sidekick. He joins Sonic on his trip to the bodega, where he becomes jealous of the attention Sonic gives K.O., believing Sonic intends to replace him as his sidekick. He helps Sonic infiltrate Boxmore and defeat Metal K-0 and Lord Boxman, with Sonic reassuring Tails that he will always remain his best friend and sidekick. Satisfied, Tails apologizes for his jealousy and makes amends with K.O. before the two leave the plaza.

== Villains ==
=== Voxmore ===
Previously known as Boxmore. It is a munitions factory for villains located across the street from Lakewood Plaza in the neutral zone. Boxman uses it to mass-produce robots, who are able to transfer their consciousness into a new body when the current one is destroyed.

==== Lord Boxman ====
Voiced by: Jim Cummings
Hero Level: -10

Lord Boxman is the founder and CEO of Boxmore, who is obsessed with destroying the plaza. He despises "friendship" and views it as a weakness. His real name is Lad Boxman, and he built his company with the help of his first creation Mr. Logic. However, when Mr. Gar built Lakewood Plaza, Boxman's obsession with destroying it led to him falling out with Mr. Logic and building new and less logic-minded robots to aid in his schemes. He is fired in the first season finale after his obsession with the plaza causes a falling out with his investors, but later regains control of Boxmore after Professor Venomous gains full ownership over it and rebrands the company as Voxmore. However, Boxman leaves his company for good after deeming Shadowy Venomous too evil even by his standards, leaving his remaining robots at Lakewood Plaza. Boxman returns in the series finale, getting back with Venomous in the epilogue.

==== Darrell ====
Voiced by: Ian Jones-Quartey
Hero Level: -4

Darrell is the robot teenager "son" of Lord Boxman, who wields a blaster on his arm and has variations that include Mega Darrel. The Darrell models as a whole act as part of a hive mind. Darrell considers himself Boxman's favorite until he build Boxman Jr. He stages a coup which results in the investors promoting him to be the new owner of Boxmore as Lord Cowboy Darrell. Darrel makes Boxmore more efficient under his leadership before later returning the company to Boxman after accepting him as the better boss. He later becomes a hero after Lord Boxman abandons them in "Dendy's Video Channel".

==== Shannon ====
Voiced by: Kari Wahlgren
Hero Level: -4

Shannon is the robot teenager "daughter" of Lord Boxman, who wields buzz saws on her arms and legs. She is more capable and better equipped than Darrel, and secretly cares for him despite wanting to one-up him and prove herself as their father's favorite. Furthermore, Shannon is a loyal daughter to Boxman despite his abusive nature and thus follows his commands as to not upset him. She later becomes a hero after Lord Boxman abandons them in "Dendy's Video Channel".

==== Raymond ====
Voiced by: Robbie Daymond
Hero Level: -3

Raymond is the fashionable robot teenager "son" of Lord Boxman, who has an affinity for roses and fights using sports equipment. Compared to Darrell and Shannon, while sharing their refusal of being upstaged, Raymond is more powerful and combat trained. He later becomes a hero after Lord Boxman abandons them in "Dendy's Video Channel".

==== Ernesto ====
Voiced by: Chris Niosi
Hero Level: -5

Ernesto is a top-hat wearing robot henchman of Lord Boxman, who mostly does office work at Boxmore though is a formidable fighter when occasionally deployed with abilities depending on the model. He later becomes a hero after Lord Boxman abandons them in "Dendy's Video Channel".

==== Jethro ====
Voiced by: David Herman
Hero Level: -1

Jethro is a "robo-child" or "robo-kid" henchman of Lord Boxman, a slow-moving robot who speaks only using his name. As a whole, the model functions as cannon fodder, with the Jethros having been known to read about existentialism in their spare time. During "Jethro's All Yours", K.O. attempted to reason to Jethro before accepting he is beyond any form of reasoning. In the episode "I Am Jethro", one Jethro becomes sentient after being overloaded from glorbs during production and hides among his Jethro brothers while planning to stage a revolt in Boxmore. While the other Jethro units are destroyed in "Dendy's Video Channel", the smart Jethro is revealed to have survived and returns alongside Boxman in the series finale, with a later unit like Deathro modeled after him.

==== Mikayla ====
Voiced by: Melissa Fahn
Hero Level: Unknown

Mikayla is an animal-based robot that resides in Boxmore as a "pet" in Boxman's family. She later becomes a hero after Lord Boxman abandons them in "Dendy's Video Channel".

==== Boxman Jr. ====
Voiced by: Jim Cummings
Hero Level: Unknown

Boxman Jr. is an infant robot modeled after Boxman whose existence is first hinted at in "Action News", where Boxman attempts to conceal his existence from the public. Boxman Jr. debuts in "You're in Control", where he is installed with a chip that Professor Venomous gave Boxman and seeks to destroy Lakewood Plaza. K.O ultimately destroys Boxman Jr. after harnessing T.K.O.'s power.

==== Professor Venomous ====
Voiced by: Steven Ogg
Hero Level: 8 (as Laserblast), -8 (as Shadowy Venomous), -7 (currently)

Professor Venomous is a purple-skinned supervillain who was originally Laserblast, a well-known superhero and founding member of P.O.I.N.T. who possessed the ability to siphon energy from others and fire energy blasts from his helmet. He developed a close relationship with Carol before he was seemingly killed in action during a stakeout, as he charged into a villain's lair and was seemingly sucked into a black hole. In reality, he survived, but lost his superpowers. Attempts at experimenting on himself to restore his lost powers resulted in his current form and an alternate personality known as Shadowy Figure. Venomous eventually resurfaced as a respected scientist in the villain community and one of Lord Boxman's clients. At some point, he gained Fink, a young humanoid rat "minion" who he treats like a daughter. During the first season, while Shadowy Figure orchestrates the manifestation of T.K.O., Venomous expresses his admiration for Boxman by providing him with a bio-chip that would later be used in Boxman Jr.'s creation. After regaining his passion for evil while taking in Boxman in "Boxman Crashes", Venomous uses the money he extorted from Congresswoman to buy Boxmore from its investors and reinstate Boxman as its head, with him as Boxman's business partner. He also becomes Boxman's lover and begins being referred to as the stepfather of Boxman's robotic children. Venomous' true identity as Laserblast, and thus K.O.'s biological father, which he was unaware of, is revealed in "Big Reveal", and he learns of Shadowy Figure's existence in "Let's Get Shadowy". Though he promises K.O. he will get rid of his alter ego, Shadowy Figure instead takes over his body, with his Shadowy Venomous form talking T.K.O. into an alliance. In the finale, T.K.O destroys Shadowy Figure after learning he was being used, and the President of the Universe teleports them to another planet. After returning to Earth in the epilogue, Venomous reconciles with Boxman and they eventually marry.

==== Fink ====
Voiced by: Lara Jill Miller

Fink is a humanoid green rat who assists Professor Venomous, whom she treats as a father figure as he shows affection to her. Fink uses glorbs to temporarily power herself up into Turbo Fink. Fink is also revealed to know about Venomous' activities as Shadowy Figure, expressing disdain for him. In the finale, while helping the heroes fight T.K.O., the President of the Universe teleports her and Venomous to another planet, which they can attack freely. After returning to Earth in the epilogue, Fink grows up to become an Esports competitor.

=== Other Villains ===
==== Succulentus ====
Voiced by: Jonathan Davis (starting in "Know Your Mom")

Succulentus is an elderly cactus man and former member of the Kactus Krew, until they were single-handedly defeated by Carol - known as Silver Spark at the time. He is light green with leafy hair and a soul patch. He wears a black tank top and baggy brown pants that go over his feet, with a wallet chain hanging from his waist. He has spiked armbands and sunglasses over his eyes. He carries a gold cane that forms into a quarterstaff when he starts headbanging. Succulentus is heavily inspired by the nu-metal genre, and he makes various references to songs released in the 90s and 2000s, including lyrics from Korn, Linkin Park, Disturbed and Evanescence. His special power, "Bloom Cactus Bloom", is a nod towards Davis' iconic scatting in Korn's 1998 hit single, "Freak on a Leash". Succulentus is said to have a family of his own, who has families of their own. During his first appearance in "Know Your Mom", Succulentus' grandson accompanies him to face off with Carol.

==== Cosma ====
Voiced by: Marina Sirtis (originally), Betsy Zajko (starting in "Deep Space Vacation")

Cosma is an orange telekinetic reptile who causes objects to disappear and reappear at will while manipulating her body at a molecular level to turn herself into a planet-eating Kaiju. She is also the leader of Boxmore's investors, having fired Boxman for putting his obsession with the plaza above the business prior to Professor Venomous buying the company.

==== Vormulax ====
Voiced by: Kari Wahlgren

Hero Level: -6

Vormulax is an evil alien and Shy Ninja's arch-enemy. Despite their constant interactions, Vormulax is perplexed by Shy Ninja's shyness.

==== Billiam Milliam ====
Voiced by: Justin McElroy

Hero Level: -7

Billiam Milliam is a gold-skinned supervillain, billionaire and investor.

==== Steamborg ====
Voiced by: David Herman

Steamborg is a giant being made of levitating rocks and a villain from Carol and Mr. Gar's past.

==== T.K.O. ====
Voiced by: Courtenay Taylor
Hero Level: -100

Full name Turbo K.O. He is the manifestation of K.O.'s repressed anger and helplessness, which Shadowy Figure helps him manifest as an alternate personality. Over the course of the series, T.K.O. gradually becomes an anti-villain after he and K.O come to an understanding in the first season finale, with K.O. providing T.K.O. a means to exert his frustration and freely use his powers without losing control. However, this means that the two are permanently "chained" together. "T.K.O.'s House" reveals that T.K.O. has an existential crisis stemming from his obsession with Shadowy Figure's interest in him and K.O. Despite not getting all the answers he wanted after he and K.O. develop their Perfect K.O. form, T.K.O. gets some closure from the attempted interrogation. T.K.O. is later exiled to K.O.'s subconscious for the trouble he caused during the events of "T.K.O. Rules", but later resurfaces in "Carl" and takes over K.O.'s body to confront Venomous about Shadowy Figure, only to be talked into an alliance with Shadowy Venomous. He is later defeated after K.O. realizes that T.K.O. was always part of him, resulting in the two merging permanently.

=== Guest Villains ===
==== Dr. Blight ====
Voiced by: Tessa Auberjonois
Origin: Captain Planet and the Planeteers

An eco-terrorist.

==== Strike ====
Voiced by: Michael Dorn

A sinister being of unknown origin who plotted to conquer the Cartoon Network world and defeat its heroes.

==== Galgarion ====
Voiced by: Michael Leon Wooley

A villain who Hero seeks to defeat.
