= Ian Jones-Quartey =

American animator (born 1984)

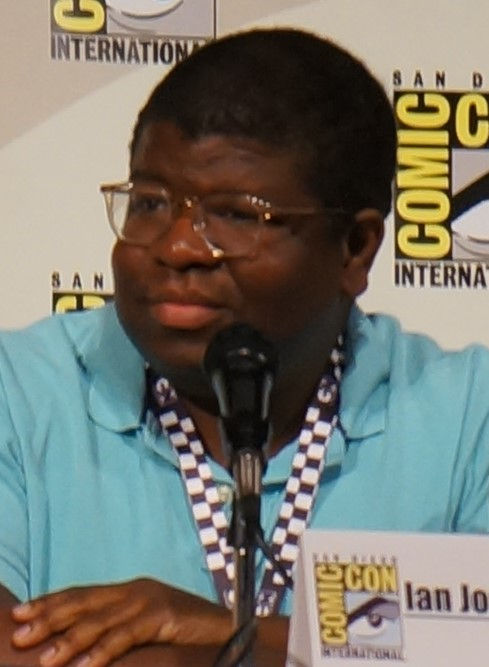
- Jones-Quartey in 2013
- Born: June 18, 1984 (age 42); Hatfield, Pennsylvania, U.S.
- Education: School of Visual Arts
- Occupations: Animator, storyboard artist, writer, director, producer, voice actor
- Years active: 2004–present
- Known for: OK K.O.! Let's Be Heroes
- Spouse: Rebecca Sugar (m. 2019)
- Relatives: Theodosia Okoh (maternal grandmother)

Ian Jones-Quartey (born June 18, 1984) is an American animator, storyboard artist, writer, director, producer, and voice actor. He is the creator of the animated series OK K.O.! Let's Be Heroes, based on his Cartoon Network pilot Lakewood Plaza Turbo, which ran on the network from 2017 to 2019. He has also provided many voice roles, particularly Radicles X, Darrell, Crinkly Wrinkly, and Pird as well as Wallow from Bravest Warriors. He is also known for his webcomic RPG World and his work on Steven Universe, Adventure Time, and Bravest Warriors. He is the grandson of Ghanaian artist Theodosia Okoh, who designed the flag of Ghana in 1957.

== Early life ==
Jones-Quartey was born in Hatfield, Pennsylvania on June 18, 1984, and was raised in Columbia, Maryland. He and his family moved to Oakland Mills, Columbia, Maryland, around 1993. His father was a pharmaceutical engineer, and his mother worked as a librarian for the chemical company W. R. Grace. Jones-Quartey attended Long Reach High School in Columbia and the School of Visual Arts in New York City.

== Career ==
Jones-Quartey created the webcomic RPG World, which won Web Cartoonists' Choice Awards in 2001 and 2002. In 2007, he collaborated with audio specialist and YouTuber Jim Gisriel to co-create the web animation series and comedy hip-hop duo nockFORCE, rapping under the stage name "effnocka" as well as voicing his character in Adobe Flash animations.

His first job in television animation was on The Venture Bros.. He went on to be a storyboard supervisor and revisionist for Adventure Time and a storyboard artist for Secret Mountain Fort Awesome. He supplies the voice of Wallow in Bravest Warriors and was the supervising director and co-developer of the Cartoon Network series Steven Universe.

In 2013, Jones-Quartey's short Lakewood Plaza Turbo aired on Cartoon Network as a television pilot. He had pitched the series two years prior when he had been a storyboard supervisor on Adventure Time. The short was retooled as a mobile game entitled OK K.O.! Lakewood Plaza Turbo, which was released on Cartoon Network's Anything app in February 2016. Lakewood Plaza Turbo ran as a network series beginning March 2017, and OK K.O.! Let's Be Heroes premiered on Cartoon Network on August 1.

In 2018, he appeared in the first season of a podcast entitled Drawn: The Story of Animation, from Cartoon Network and HowStuffWorks, which provided listeners with a behind-the-scenes perspective on animation from voice actors, historians, and creators of animated series.

In June 2019, he was a panelist at the Annecy Animation Festival, alongside Rebecca Sugar, at a panel entitled "The Making of Steven Universe". In July 2019, he appeared as a panelist at the RTX Animation Festival at the Fairmont Austin. On September 2, 2019, the film Steven Universe: The Movie was released. Jones-Quartey was one of its co-executive producers, while Sugar served as executive producer and director. Between October 2020 and April 2021, the anti-racism PSAs "Don't Deny It, Defy It", "Tell the Whole Story", "See Color", and "Be an Ally", that he worked on with Sugar, featuring characters from Steven Universe, were released on the Cartoon Network YouTube channel.

In late January 2025, Jones-Quartey mentioned that he had a "fun meeting" with The Walt Disney Company, hinting at a potential new animated project with them.

On June 11, 2025, at an Annecy International Animation Film Festival event, it was announced that a sequel series to Steven Universe, entitled Steven Universe: Lars of the Stars, was in development with Prime Video, with Cartoon Network Studios producing it, while Rebecca Sugar and Jones-Quartey will be executive producers. During the event, Sugar said she missed her world and characters, and said she couldn't wait to share the series and thanked everyone for their support. Sugar also told The Wrap that the Steven Universe characters and world are important to her, said she was "thrilled" to do the series, and said the biggest part for her was that she is "co-creating it with Ian Jones-Quartey," and noted that all she wants to do is "make cartoons with him."

On June 12, 2025, Adult Swim announced that Jones-Quartey, Patrick McHale, Rebecca Sugar and Pendleton Ward were developing an animated special under the title "The Elephant". The animated special, which released on December 19, 2025, is in three acts, and is 20 minutes long.

Jones-Quartey directed Sonic the Hedgehog Presents: The Chaotix Casefiles, an audio drama podcast series released in early 2026.

== Personal life ==
Jones-Quartey is a grandson of Theodosia Okoh, the designer of the flag of Ghana; he based the Steven Universe character Nanefua Pizza on her.

By 2017, he was living in Los Angeles. He married Steven Universe creator Rebecca Sugar on December 4, 2019, having been together for twelve years.

== Influences ==
Jones-Quartey cites Akira Toriyama's series Dragon Ball and Dr. Slump as inspiration for vehicle designs of his own. He stated, "We're all big Toriyama fans on [Steven Universe], which kind of shows a bit."

== Filmography ==
=== Animation ===
Year	Title	Role	Notes
2006–2010	The Venture Bros.	Art director, animation director, inker	
2007	Supernormal	Animation director	
2010–2013	Adventure Time	Storyboard artist	
2011–2012	Secret Mountain Fort Awesome	Writer, storyboard artist	
2012	Animation Pals	Co-creator, writer, storyboard artist	
2013–2016, 2019	Steven Universe	Executive producer, supervising director, writer, storyboard artist	
2017–2019	OK K.O.! Let's Be Heroes	Creator, executive producer, writer, storyboard artist	
2019	Steven Universe: The Movie	Executive producer, writer	Television film
2023	One Piece	Additional animator	Episode 1066
2025	The Elephant	Creator, screenwriter, animator	Animated special
TBA	Steven Universe: Lars of the Stars	Co-creator, executive producer, writer, storyboard artist	

=== Voice work ===
==== Television ====
Year	Title	Role	Notes
2012	Animation Pals	Hunchback	Main cast
2012–2018	Bravest Warriors	Wallow, additional voices	Main cast
2013	Lakewood Plaza Turbo	Radicles X, Darrell, A Real Magic Skeleton	OK K.O.! Let's Be Heroes pilot
2013–2015	Steven Universe	Mr. Queasy, Cat Fingers, Actor	3 episodes
2015	Welcome to My Life	Bully	Short
2017–2019	OK K.O.! Let's Be Heroes	Radicles X, Darrell, Crinkly Wrinkly, Pird, additional voices	Main cast
2018	Mighty Magiswords	Radicles X	Episode: "Let's Team Up Because We Aren't Bad Friends"
2019	Steven Universe Future	Snowflake Obsidian	Episode: "Guidance"
2020	The Fungies!	Insane Jolt	Episode: "Pam Runs Forever"
2024–present	NOXP	Ezekiel	2 episodes

==== Movies ====
Year	Title	Role	Notes
2025	AJ Goes to the Dog Park	SapperFlash45	

==== Video games ====
Year	Title	Role	Notes
2018	OK K.O.! Let's Play Heroes	Radicles X, Darrell, Crinkly Wrinkly, Mr. Logic, Gerald Nametag, Ancient Scroll	
2022	Neon White	Neon Yellow	

=== Comics ===
- RPG World

=== Other ===
Year	Title	Role	Notes	Source
2026	Sonic the Hedgehog Presents: The Chaotix Casefiles	Director	Audio drama podcast	
