= Nickelodeon and LGBTQ representation =

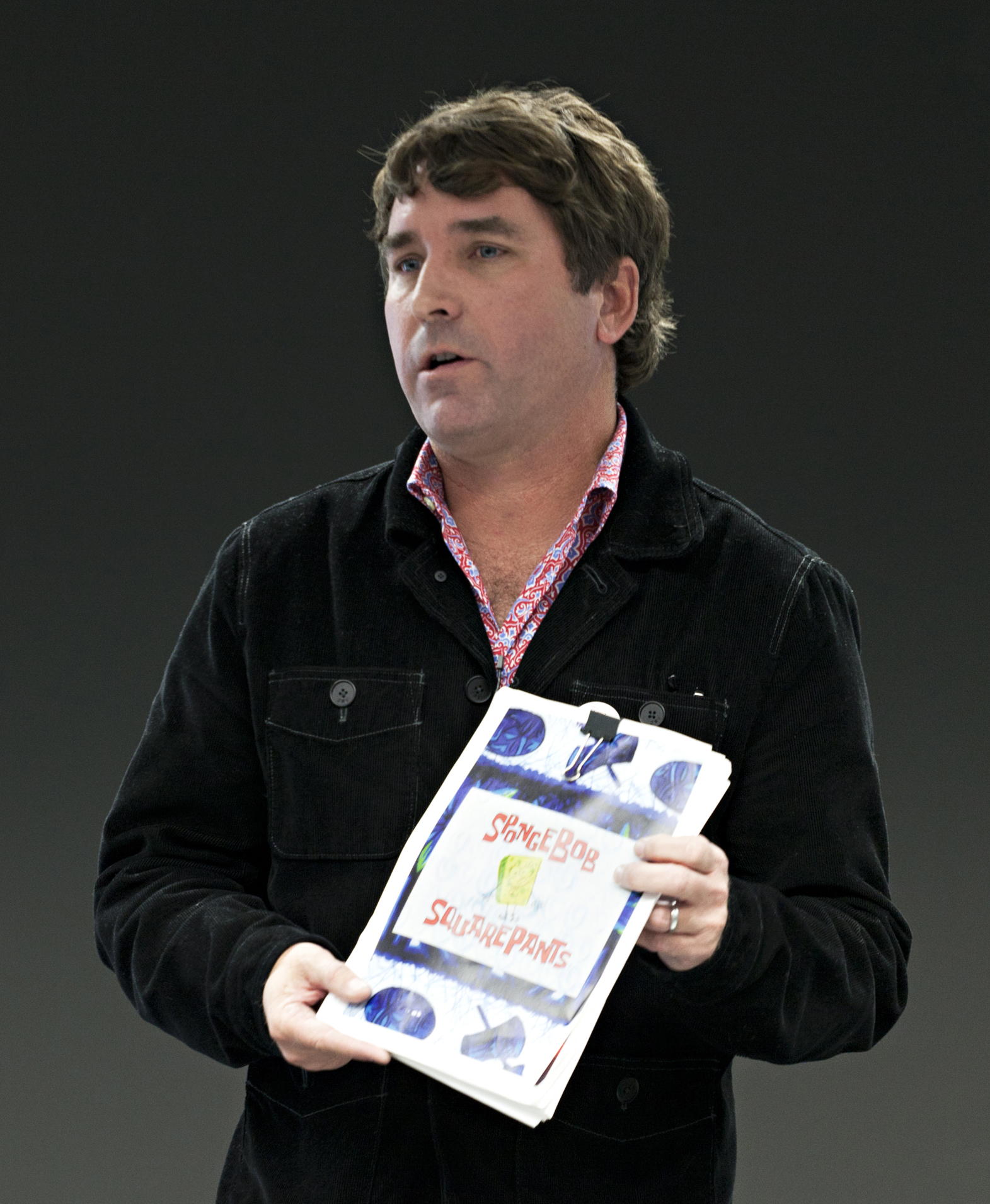
Stephen Hillenburg holding the SpongeBob SquarePants pitch bible in 2011

Lesbian, gay, bisexual, transgender and queer (LGBTQ) characters have had varied representations in animated productions under Nickelodeon, a subdivision of Paramount Global, including films from the studios Nickelodeon Animation Studio, and its divisions Avatar Studios and Nickelodeon Digital, and programming from Nicktoons as well as the streaming service Paramount+. From 1979 onward, when Nickelodeon was launched, the channel, and its programming blocks, like Nick Jr., has featured lesbian, gay, bisexual and transgender (LGBT) characters in its programming.

== Representation ==
=== Queer coding ===
In 2002, in response to criticism from conservative Christian organizations, SpongeBob SquarePants series creator Stephen Hillenburg described SpongeBob as asexual, not gay. He repeated this in 2005 when the similar organizations claimed that SpongeBob SquarePants was "homosexual propaganda." One scholar argued that characters like SpongeBob SquarePants challenged the "signifiers of traditional masculinity" and noted that SpongeBob was "primarily asexual" but has a traditional wardrobe, and his design uses masculine and feminine signifiers at the same time. Johnson also noted that SpongeBob can fluctuate between "masculine aggression and...feminine positivity", and has gender ambiguity like Jerry and Bugs Bunny. Others noted concerns by conservative Christian groups that a certain SpongeBob episode "promote[d] gay lifestyles" and claimed it was "inappropriate for the young audience" while Hillenberg had previously stated that the series had no "gay subtext" and that SpongeBob and his friends were not gay in response to claims by evangelical leader James Dobson.

Susan Kahlenberg stated, in 2017, that Nickelodeon, like Disney, has a wide reach into U.S. households, and must negotiate "commercial interests" with "ideological production," with underrepresentation of female and transgender characters, while traditional gender stereotypes are maintained at times, among shows aired by both networks, while Nickeledon was said to position itself as "gender-neutral" in its programming, and has the capacity to reject "traditional gender codes" in programs aired. Further scholarship noted that Nickelodeon dominated children's media, along with Disney, within the United States, and that although children's television upholds "mainstream heterosexuality" there have been some instances of "resistance to heteronormativity" and stated that Nickelodeon, among other networks, had introduced new characters and series which positively represented queer individuals "in a subtle way."

In June 2020, Nickelodeon posted a Pride-themed post on social media. Characters such as Korra from The Legend of Korra, Swoz Schwartz in Henry Danger, and SpongeBob were featured. Samson Amore of The Wrap noted that while although Korra was confirmed as bisexual and Swoz as transgender, SpongeBob was asexual, with Hillenburg noting that "he never intended to write any kind of sexuality" into the series, with fans embracing SpongeBob's inclusion in the post. However, Bill Bradley of HuffPost noted that the social media post did not confirm SpongeBob as gay, noting Hillenberg had described SpongeBob as asexual, and SpongeBob's voice actor, Tom Kenny, had called the show's characters "pre-sexual."

Spencer Bollettieri, in a post for Screen Rant in 2022, highlighted the thirty-year history of the network, noting that Nickelodeon always had a "special place" for LGBTQ+ characters, but it took many years for the characters to become "front and center," noting contributions to LGBTQ+ culture in the Rocko’s Modern Life episode "Closet Clown", featuring queer characters "mainly shielded by subtleties and metaphors," and adapting Harriet the Spy, which was "queer coded" and by Louise Fitzhugh, a lesbian author. Bollettieri further pointed to series like Degrassi: The Next Generation and Dottie's Magic Pockets, calling them bold first steps in "trying to give LGBTQ+ families a voice." In another article, Bollettieri pointed to the character, Marco in Animorphs who danced with Ax in the series finale "alongside other romantic couples" and is said to lead for Marco to canonically come out.

=== Positive representation ===
On December 19, 2014, The Legend of Korra, a Nickelodeon show, aired their season finale, which showed Korra and Asami holding hands, showing they are in a relationship. As such, the show became one of the first western children's animation series to not only feature major LGBT characters, but also a lead LGBT character. One of the show creators, Michael Dante DiMartino confirmed Korra and Asami as having romantic feeling together, while the other show creator Bryan Konietzko said he was "very proud' of the ending, and that while he loved "how their relationship arc took its time," there was a limit to how much they could go with in the show. He also hoped that the show would move LGBTQ representation forward. In the aftermath of series finale, which aired on Nickelodeon and Nick.com, there were debates about "queer representation in children's media." Commenters and reviewers, such as Doug Madison of the Washington Post and Zosha Millman of Vulture, stating that the series paved the path for further queer representation. Additional scholars, like Lauren Chochinov and Diana Burgos compared Korra to queer themes in Sailor Moon and She-Ra and the Princesses of Power, arguing that all three give audiences a roadmap for "navigating through the coded systems of gender and sexuality that poison their narratives"

Animation writers Lee Knox Ostertag and Laura Sreebny told Jake Pitre of Them, that Korra inspired them to write stories centered on queer relationships, while Shadi Petosky argued that no "specific episode or cartoon is a turning point" but stated that "overall queer liberation...happened culturally," storyboarder Mia Resella said that series like Korra give creators "ammunition" when they are pitching a series, and storyboarder Pearl Low stated that Korra made room for queer storytelling. Samuel Spencer of Newsweek described the ending of Korra as a "milestone", describing Korra as having the "first out LGBTQ+ character to lead a children's cartoon," noted homophobic responses to this representation from various organizations and some fans, stated that few shows have gone further than Korra, and expressed hope that young queer creators would "push LGBTQ+ representation even further." Scholar Olivia Stor later described confirmation of the relationship between Korra and Asami making them one of the "first canon sapphic couples in children's television cartoons."

Jeremy Blacklow, GLAAD director of entertainment media, stated in August 2017, that after Doc McStuffins, featured a lesbian (and interracial) married couple in an episode, it would be a turning point for executives who fear boycotts from conservative groups and called it a "major win for both Disney and preschool series." In later years, media outlets and scholars would note LGBTQ+ themes in Danger Force, a Blue's Clues & You! song, Rubble & Crew (River) and The Loud House (Mr. McBride and Mr. McBride).

In August 2019, Rocko's Modern Life: Static Cling, a television film and sequel to Nickelodeon's 1993 series Rocko's Modern Life, began airing on Netflix. The producers worked with GLAAD to endure that the transgender character, in the form of cartoonist frog Rachel Bighead (known by a different name in the original series) as well as a plotline involving her coming out to her parents, Ed and Bev Bighead, was respectful to the LGBTQ+ community and fit within the show itself. Previously, Rocko's Modern Life was reported to have a "subversive coming out allegory" in an episode of the series which came out in 1996, entitled "Closet Clown." In an interview with SYFY, the creator of Rocko's Modern Life, Joe Murray said that changing Rachel's character in the film was like a "natural progression," a change better for her and "how these communities are represented in modern day" and says something like this would never had happened in the 1990s. In another interview, with Collider, Murray said they thought it would "be a natural thing" for Rachel's character to transition, that he thought it was a "great idea" but that Nickelodeon was a little shocked and hesitant at first, with Nickelodeon president Cyma Zarghami suggesting they get GLAAD involved, and the crew agreed.

The film was praised for centering on LGBTQ life by Devin Randall for Instinct Magazine, calling making Rachel a trans character would be "true LGBTQ representation" while Taylor Hosking of Vice described the film as a "huge step forward," noting that previously cartoons had generally "hinted at LGBTQ characters with coded references only parseable by adults," noting examples such as Betty DeVille as a butch character in Rugrats, and queer-coded villains in The Lion King (Scar) and Aladdin (Jafar). Jacob Oller of Paste said that the LGBTQ themes become "a major plot point" and changes the story from a "self-referential one-note one-liner." Polly Conway of Common Sense Media said the film has positive message about unconditional love and accepting change, saying this is mainly explored "through a transgender main character's transition from male to female." Joe Matar of Den of Geek said that LGBTQ issues are the main theme of the film and handled "in a smart, graceful, and surprisingly poignant way."

== Criticism ==
=== Censorship ===
Some Nickelodeon series have experienced censorship, like The Loud House and Mysticons. The Loud House was censored by a South African broadcaster, DStv, according to NewNowNext. The series featured an interracial gay couple, Howard and Harold McBride, which was introduced in the episode "Overnight Success", with the couple described by series executive producer Michael Rubiner as only natural, This couple was met with an "overwhelmingly positive reaction" from the audience and would be the first pair of married male characters to be depicted on a Nickelodeon series.

Prior to this, the series finale of Legend of Korra depicted Asami Sato and Korra holding hands. Some reviewers and commentators described the moment as an inspiration for creators, as well as "groundbreaking and romantic", but constrained, as this representation of the relationship was only shown in the finale. Another criticism was the lack of a kiss between the characters, with some claiming it was "not allowed on screen by Nickelodeon". Others noted that while the series ending was a "milestone", and turning point for Western animation, Nickelodeon's constraints caused representation to only be subtextual. For instance, Mey Rude of Autostraddle noted that while the relationship between Korra and Asami, was built up during the course of the series, the words "I love you" were never uttered, nor did the characters kiss.

One academic thesis described the "queer subtext" in the series, calling the hand-holding of Asami and Korra to be a "small gesture", with Nickelodeon, according to series co-creator Bryan Konietzko, supportive but preventing anything "more overt." Their relationship was later explored in the sequel comic book series, The Legend of Korra: Turf Wars, which was praised by reviewers, some of whom called it a fitting continuation of the animated series. Co-creator Michael DiMartino began outlining the story in July 2015, several months after The Legend of Korra series finale aired on December 19, 2014. Following the conclusion of The Legend of Korra, DiMartino was touched by the positive feedback from LGBTQ audiences about the impact Korra and Asami's relationship had in their lives. Some stated that this comic series allowed DiMartino and Konietzko to explore the "relationship of Korra and Asami...[and] queer themes", including bisexual representation, without constraints, but has a "complicated legacy" in confronting other forms of oppression, noted the social media focus on the canonization of the relationship between Korra and Asami, and the "queer moments" within the series, which was termed "overly safe", in contrast to depictions in the comics.

In June 2021, former Disney executive David Levine, who served as vice president of kids programming for Disney in the United Kingdom (UK), Europe, and Africa for 16 years (2004 – 2020), told Insider in a 2021 interview that "a lot of conservative opinion" drove depictions of characters of the Disney Channel, Cartoon Network, and Nickelodeon, leaving little hope for LGBTQ representation for nearly two decades. Insider also reported that the series creator of Mysticons, Sean Jara, brought in queer writers and women into the series writing team, following the change of the series to center on four teenage girls, with these writers helping build out "an arc between lesbian characters Zarya Moonwolf and Kitty Boon". The publication noted that, although Jara received support from fellow producers and Nickelodeon, one unnamed business partner was concerned that the storyline was not "age-appropriate" for young viewers. This resulted in a kiss scene between Zarya Moonwolf and Kitty Boon being cut, even as Jara fought for their romance to remain included in the series.

Gargoyles creator Greg Weisman said that creators would "never" be allowed to "be explicit" with "adult" themes, including LGBTQ elements, due to fear of backlash. "If they [Disney] got two letters, they would freak out and talk about [how] we've got to re-edit the show," Weisman said. "They were scared of parental response." However, a decline in the parental rights movement targeting LGBTQ content in TV shows, as well as a rise in acceptance of gay and lesbian people in the United States, allowed for more LGBTQ inclusion in family-oriented and children's media on television. However, acceptance of transgender and nonbinary people was lower, resulting in less public support for inclusive policies, as noted by NORC at the University of Chicago.

== Awards ==
The Danger Force episode Manlee Man features a transgender boy Quinn played by real-life transgender actor Sasha Cohen. The episode was nominated for a GLAAD Media Award in 2022. The series also won a GLAAD Award for Outstanding Kids and Family Programming.

Various Nickeledon series were nominated with awards in 2023. For instance, Danger Force was nominated for Outstanding Kids and Family Programming. Additionally, the series Big Nate was nominated for a GLAAD award for Outstanding Kids & Family Programming - Animated the same year. Also, the film Monster High: The Movie, a spinoff from Monster High (2022), was nominated for a GLAAD Award for Outstanding Kids & Family Programming - Live Action. The Monster High special episode, "The Monster Fest", also won the 2024 Velma Award in the Best Guest Star Extravaganza category.

In 2025, Monster High was nominated for a GLAAD Media Award for Outstanding Children's Programming in 2025. The Fairly OddParents: A New Wish episode "Wellsington Hotellsington" won an award for being the best new nonbinary cast member: iris menas, who voices Winn. The series won a GLAAD Media Award for Outstanding Children’s Programming. The Really Loud House season 2 episode "Louds in Love", which features Luna Loud and Sam Sharp dating was nominated for the award.

== See also ==
- Cartoon Network and LGBT representation
- Disney and LGBT representation in animation
- Netflix and LGBT representation in animation
- LGBT representation in children's television
- LGBTQ themes in Western animation
- Independent animation#Representations
- List of LGBT-related films by year
- Cross-dressing in film and television
- List of cross-dressing characters in animated series
- List of animated films with LGBT characters
- List of lesbian characters in animation
- List of gay characters in animation
- List of fictional trans characters
- List of fictional intersex characters
- List of fictional non-binary characters
- List of bisexual characters in animation
- List of fictional pansexual characters
- List of fictional asexual characters
