= Disney and LGBTQ representation in animation =

This article features the history of the representation of lesbian, gay, bisexual, transgender and queer (LGBTQ) characters in animated productions under The Walt Disney Company, including films from the studios Walt Disney Animation Studios and Pixar, and programming from the Disney Branded Television channels as well as the streaming service Disney+. From 1983 onward, Disney's content often included LGBTQ stereotypes or the content was censored in series which aired on Toon Disney such as Blazing Dragons. Some creators have also criticized Disney studio executives of cutting LGBTQ scenes from their shows in the past, or criticized that their shows were not seen as part of the "Disney brand", like The Owl House.

== Representation ==
=== Queer coding ===
Gender has always been a component of animation, with scholars Harry Benshoff and Sean Griffin writing that animation has always "hint[ed] at the performative nature of gender." Some argued that the Walt Disney Company played with gender stereotypes in the past, featuring effeminate or sissy characters, or those coded as gay, which occurred while the characters were comedic and kept at arms length. Continuing from the late 1980s, villains in Disney films which were queer coded began to appear.

Gaston and LeFou in the 1991 film Beauty and the Beast and Jafar from the 1992 film Aladdin were created by an openly gay animator named Andreas Deja, and sang songs with lyrics by Howard Ashman, who was also openly gay. Deja supervised animation for those characters, with some noting the campy value of these characters. The fact that Deja had also worked on Scar in The Lion King and the titular character in Hercules, for example, has been discussed as an influence on the development of some Disney characters. In a June 1994 article in The Advocate, an executive producer of The Lion King, Thomas Schumacher, a gay man, argued that there were "a lot of gay people at every level" of Disney, and called it a "very supportive environment". He noted that he brought his partner, Matt White, to an annual company beach party and long company retreats and that while some executives were uncomfortable with Schumacher bringing his partner, higher executives didn't give him any trouble. Schumacher also said that while he regretted handing over reins of the film to Don Hahn, he was proud of songs by Tim Rice, a lyricist, and Elton John in the film. The Advocate noted that even if there aren't any openly gay or lesbian characters in the film, there is sensitivity to LGBTQ issues in the upper echelon of Disney.

This queer coding had its disadvantages, with networks not wanting to show overt representation. Rebecca Sugar argued that it is really heavy for a kid to only exist as a villain or a joke in an animated series. In 2011, Deja told news.com.au Disney would have a "family that has two dads or two mums" if they find the "right kind of story with that kind of concept." However, other critics criticized such queer-coded villains as contributing to homophobic discourse and equating queerness with evil itself.

Historian Peter C. Kunze argued that Ashman was recruited by Disney from Broadway, saying that while working with Alan Menken, he crafted songs in The Little Mermaid (1989), Beauty and the Beast and Aladdin. Kunze noted that Ashman and animators on The Little Mermaid were inspired by gay culture and gay icons. He also pointed out that Ashman was supported by Jeffrey Katzenberg after coming out as HIV-Positive, with the company even creating a production unit near his home so he could receive treatment in New York City rather than traveling to Burbank, California, with Beauty and the Beast dedicated to him. Kunze further noted that Albert Tavares, a gay man, oversaw casting on The Little Mermaid.

In 2006, Brother Bear II, directed by Ben Gluck, advocated for themes of diversity and personal transformation. The film portrays Nita's transformation into a bear, which is met with unconditional support from her father, who affirms, “I will love you no matter what you choose,” highlighting the importance of acceptance and love across differences. Melissa Etheridge, inspired by the film, wrote three original songs for the soundtrack.

In May 2020, Amber Vucinich, a story revisionist for Rapunzel's Tangled Adventure, revealed that Cassandra "Cass" was gay coded, with "sapphic looks" toward the story's protagonist, Rapunzel. She also said that there were many "queer women who boarded scenes [of] Cassandra," and that women-love-women vibes were ingrained in every drawing she did of the character.

In March 2021, Kelly Marie Tran, the voice actress of Raya in the film Raya and the Last Dragon, argued that Raya is queer, stating that she believed there were "some romantic feelings" between Raya and Namaari in the story. She later made clear that this isn't the official Disney position and hoped for a Disney warrior that is "openly in the LGBTQ community" in the future, perhaps even a person who is disabled.

In June 2021, Luca was released on Disney+. Some argued that the film felt "gay" even if not "explicitly queer," and more ambiguous, comparing it to the 2017 live-action film Call Me by Your Name and the 2020 animated film Wolfwalkers. Others said that Luca and Alberto hiding their true sea monster identities was an allegory for people who are members of the LGBTQ+ community, feeling as though they need to hide their true selves in order to be accepted. The film's director, Enrico Casarosa, said this was unintentional and that his original vision for the film was to explore the time in a child's life before romance, but he has since welcomed the interpretation after the film's release, also stating: "While I identify with pronouns he/him and I am a straight man, the themes of diversity, acceptance and inclusion in our movie are dear to my heart".

=== Positive representation ===
Alex Hirsch has been a vocal critic of Disney practices specially with the company's LGTBQ representation.

In the 2010s, the series finale of Gravity Falls, aired on the Disney Channel, and featured Sheriff Blubs and Deputy Durland confirmed to be a gay couple.

In 2016, Jared Bush, writer and co-director of the film Zootopia, stated that the film features a gay couple, Bucky and Pronk Oryx-Antlerson.

In March 2017, Star vs. the Forces of Evil would make headlines with an episode entitled "Just Friends". The episode featured characters attending a concert and later concert-goers starting to kiss, including same-sex couples.

On September 30, 2018, Marvel Rising: Secret Warriors aired on the Disney Channel and Disney XD. The team included America Chavez, a Latina lesbian superhero. GLAAD expressed hope that the film would allow Chavez to be represented accurately, and "serve as an introduction of America and further queer characters to the Marvel Cinematic Universe." The film was later described as "a superhero tale with diversity oozing out of every animated frame," with note of Chavez having two mothers.

On May 22, 2020, an animated short film titled Out premiered on Disney+. This short Pixar film revolves around Greg attempting to hide a framed photo of him and his boyfriend, Manuel, from his parents, out of fear for their disapproval. The seventh short film in the SparkShorts series, it is both Disney's and Pixar's first short to feature a gay main character and storyline, including an on-screen same-sex kiss.

In the 2020s, The Owl House featured a bisexual protagonist, Luz Noceda, and various other LGBTQ characters. GLAAD praised it as a "noteworthy" series which "introduced new queer women characters". Previously, series creator Dana Terrace confirmed Luz Noceda as bisexual and Amity Blight as a lesbian in a Reddit AMA in September 2020. Amity and Luz represent Disney's first animated LGBT+ female regular characters. The series also featured Raine Whispers, who goes by they/them pronouns and is voiced by transgender and non-binary actor Avi Roque, and is Disney's first non-binary character.

On September 29, 2020, Samantha "Sam" King, a writer for the Season 3 episode of DuckTales, "They Put a Moonlander On the Earth!", confirmed that Lieutenant Penumbra is a lesbian character. King wished it had been more overt and said that people should continue to ask for better representation. In 2020, she participated in a DuckTales zine where she confirmed that Launchpad is bisexual, saying "LP just has so much love in him, that of course he's not only romantically attracted to one gender."

In March 2022, leaked clips from a Walt Disney Company meeting showed the president of Disney General Entertainment, Karey Burke, explain to staff that she is a parent of "two queer children," and the production coordinator at Disney Television Animation, Allen Martsch, note that his team is trying to include "more trans and gender non-conforming characters" in Disney animations. Also, in the meeting, Layota Raveneau, series director of The Proud Family: Louder and Prouder and Rise Up, Sing Out, said that she was adding queerness wherever she could in the projects she worked on for Disney. Elsewhere, Burke promised that 50% of the characters in content created by the Disney General Entertainment would be "from minority groups."

On May 21, 2022, Luz and Amity kissed each other on the lips in The Owl House episode "Clouds on the Horizon". It is the first same-sex kiss between the main characters in a Disney animated series. Strange World, which was released on November 23, 2022, features Ethan Clade, who is the first gay lead character in a Disney animated film. Ethan Clade is voiced by gay comedian Jaboukie Young-White. However, the film underperformed at the box office, as did Lightyear the same year, leading to a strategic pivot for Disney. Pete Docter of Pixar asserted that "fan expectations" hurt Lightyear, while The Independent said the film had a "nebulous and confusing" plot and it represents the obsession of the industry with "fallible, perhaps even doomed" filmmaking for franchises, and noted that both films were among those which had "protracted right-wing backlashes."

Although both films also led to criticism of Disney, by notable Republican donor and billionaire investor Nelson Peltz, the company stood by its business strategy. Later, Disney CEO Bob Iger called upon the company to prioritize entertainment rather than anything else, and the company prioritized business outcomes over initiatives for equity, inclusion, and diversity.

Elemental which was released on June 16, 2023, features Lake Ripple who is the first non-binary character in a Pixar film, and their girlfriend Ghibli. Lake uses they/them and she/her pronouns. Lake Ripple is voiced by non-binary actor Kai Ava Hauser.

== Criticism ==
Shang Li was not included in the 2020 live-action remake of Mulan. One of the film's producers said that Shang was dropped in response to the MeToo movement, arguing that "having a commanding officer that is also the sexual love interest was very uncomfortable and we didn't think it was appropriate". This was met with social media backlash from fans of the original film and members of the LGBTQ community, with Reed initially surprised by criticism of Shang's removal, but acknowledged that the character had become an LGBTQ icon. He added that Shang's role would be served by two new characters, Commander Tung and Chen Honghui. Even so, some reviewers called the interactions between Honghui and Mulan to be more homoerotic than Li Shang's in the animated version and can be read as bisexual while others criticized the reasoning of Reed as incorrect. Mulan was described, by one scholar as having a character, Mulan herself, who could successfully pass as the opposite sex and as subverting her traditionally assigned gender signifiers, while having an unusually masculine body. It was further stated that as a result, Mulan was the "perfect embodiment of a drag king" even though she maintains her heterosexuality as she is attracted to Li Shang, comparing Mulan's interpretation of her sexuality to that of Bugs Bunny. Furthermore, gay playwright Harvey Fierstein voiced a character in Mulan, and only accepted the part after confirming that the rest of the cast was Asian so he would not take work away from an Asian actor.

A few homophobic conservative Christian commentators decried what they considered to be implicit homosexuality in the 2013 film Frozen, considering Elsa's being different from others, her ostracism from society, and her independence and rejection of male suitors, as metaphors for lesbianism. Elsa's song "Let it Go" has been compared to the phenomenon of coming out of the closet.

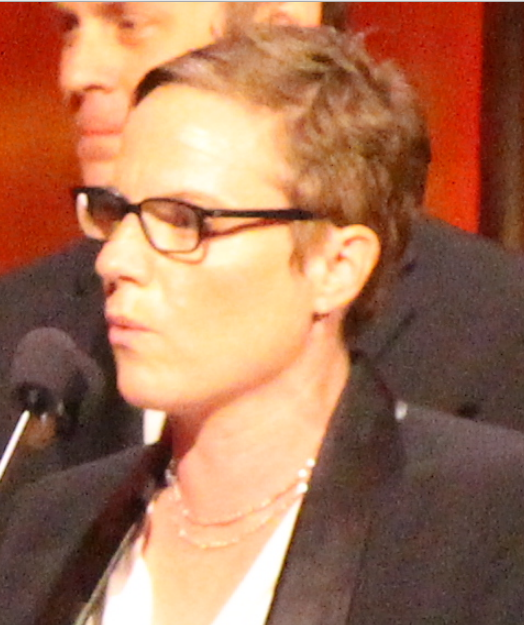
Chris Nee, creator of Doc McStuffins, pictured accepting the Peabody for Doc McStuffins

In August 2017, Doc McStuffins featured a lesbian (and interracial) married couple, Thea and Edie, voiced by lesbian actresses Wanda Sykes and Portia de Rossi respectively. These two characters would be the first same-sex couple featured in a Disney Junior pre-school series. Some argued that this episode would be a turning point for executives who fears boycotts from conservative groups like the Family Research Council and One Million Moms, calling the episode a "major win for both Disney and preschool series," showing that LGBTQ characters could appears in shows aimed at younger viewers without retaliation or crisis.

Star Wars Resistance, which aired from October 2018 to January 2020 on the Disney Channel and Disney XD, featured LGBTQ characters. In this animation, Orka and Flix run the Office of Acquisitions on the Colossus, with Orka doing the negotiations. Justin Ridge, an executive producer, said that it is safe to call them a couple, adding "they're absolutely a gay couple and we're proud of that" on the Coffee With Kenobi podcast. Some said that they didn't see themselves in the show because they were only confirmed outside of the show's universe by the show's creators. Flix is voiced by queer actor Jim Rash.

In early June 2021, in celebration of Pride Month, Disney unveiled new merchandise and tweeted an illustration. In response, Alex Hirsch, the creator of the Disney series Gravity Falls, criticized Disney studio executives for cutting LGBTQ scenes from their shows. In his tweet, which was retweeted thousands of times, he urged people to "mercilessly" spam the executives by saying there is "room for everyone under the rainbow" if the executives claim LGBTQ+ characters are not "Disney appropriate."

The Owl House Latin American Spanish dub in September 2021 was met with criticism by both viewers and Roque for portraying Raine as a cisgender male instead of non-binary. The character has also been portrayed as a cisgender male in other dubs.

In April 2022, Peter C. Kunze, a historian at Tulane University argued that there is a "long history of LGBTQ audiences and employees supporting, even saving, the company from veritable demise." He also said that Disney relied on LGBTQ people to "revamp its animated films", taking the example of Howard Ashman, an openly gay man who was the lyricist for The Little Mermaid and Beauty and the Beast. Kunze argued that Disney CEO Bob Chapek should remember the company's history and "understand the invaluable contributions LGBTQ communities have made to the company he leads."

In May 2025, Disney Experiences announced that they will team up with Miral, Abu Dhabi's leading creator of immersive destinations and experiences to create a landmark Disney theme park resort in Abu Dhabi. The announcement was met with mixed reception among the public as well the LGBTQ+ community as the country is known for many laws that target the LGBTQ+ community.

=== Censorship ===
Disney executives did not always receive LGBTQ characters and relationships positively. They, for instance, cut a proposed lesbian relationship in Gravity Falls, at the same time that The Amazing World of Gumball, a series on Disney's competitor Cartoon Network, was censored for supposed "homosexual overtones" by various countries. The former National Expert Commission of Ukraine on the Protection of Public Morality advised in 2012 the banning of SpongeBob SquarePants on the grounds that it promoted homosexuality. In June 2021, David Levine, a former Disney executive who oversaw kids programming for 16 years, said that "a lot of conservative opinion" driving depictions of characters of the Disney Channel, Cartoon Network, and Nickelodeon, with no hope for LGBTQ representation, saying he still has similar conversations to this day.

A show created by Terry Jones and Gavin Scott, Blazing Dragons, aired on Teletoon in Canada, Spacetoon in Arab countries, and Canal+ in France from 1996 to 1998. In the series, Sir Blaze is a member of the Square Table, and is flamboyant and effeminate. Throughout the series, he is implied to be gay. His implicit homosexuality was censored when the series aired on Toon Disney in the United States.

The episode from the original Proud Family series "Who You Calling a Sissy" was pulled from the network after its initial airing on August 12, 2005, as a result of regarding Michael's sexual orientation while frequently being called a "sissy" at the time. The ban was lifted in 2020 as the episode is available to stream on Disney+. In February 2021, Ralph Farquhar revealed that in The Proud Family, which aired on the Disney Channel from 2001 to 2005, they had to use "code to talk about if Michael was gay, to talk about sexuality" and to be "sort of underhanded about it." He said this changed with The Proud Family: Louder and Prouder with the biggest changes to the show were "gender identity, obviously racial identity and quote-unquote wokeness," and said that sexuality can be "sort of in your face with it a lot more," manifesting itself in the storytelling. Bruce W. Smith also said that the show has more than "just one gay person...representing the entire LGBTQ+ spectrum" and said that it is "not fair" to only have one LGBTQ character in the series. Barry and Randell kiss in the episode "Father Figures". It is the first Disney series to feature a same-sex kiss between a married couple. Screen Rant argued that the revival broke down barriers through inclusion of multicultural families and characters belonging to the LGBTQ+ community.

On March 10, 2022, Pixar employees argued that "nearly every moment" of openly gay affection was cut due to requests from Disney executives, even if creative teams and Pixar executives objected, arguing that these employees are being barred from creating queer content in animated films. Some critics countered that Pixar also downplayed queer moments in films like Turning Red with the character Priya Mangal.

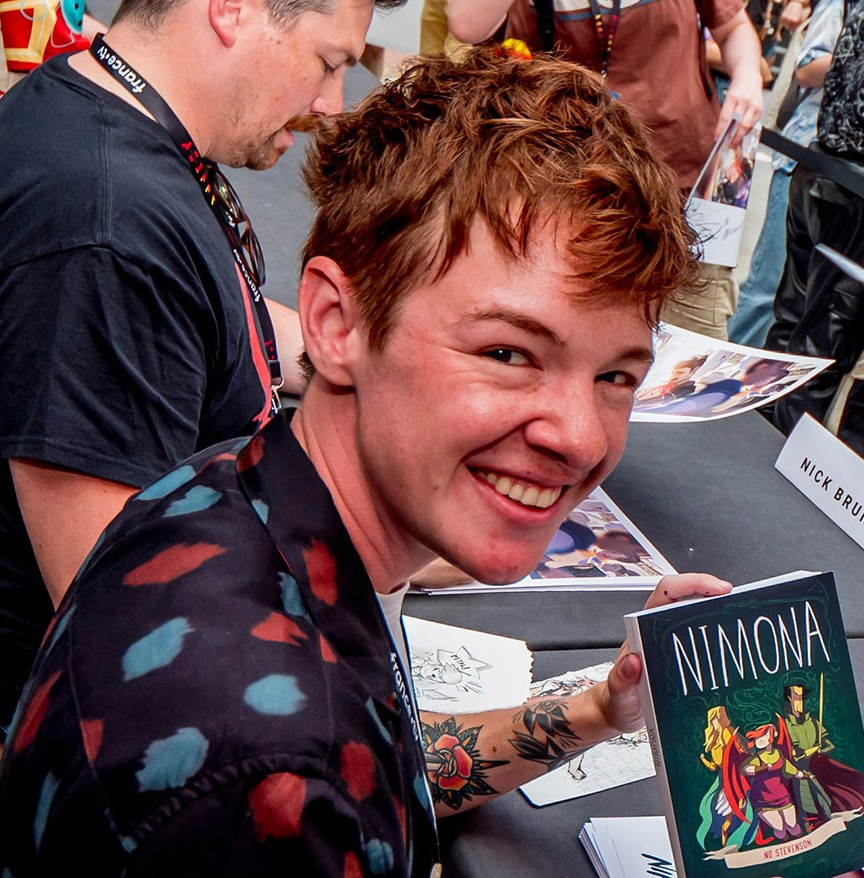
ND Stevenson, creator of the webcomic, Nimona

In March 2022, amid the controversy of Disney's involvement in Florida's Parental Rights in Education Act and lack of criticism from CEO Bob Chapek until after the bill had passed, three former Blue Sky staff members stated the Nimona film received pushback from Disney leadership, centered around the film's LGBT themes and a same-sex kiss. While staffers said that the kiss scene was taken out of presentations to Disney executives, they said still held out hope that it would be included in the final film. It was also reported in mid-March 2022 that a same-sex kiss in Lightyear, which was released on June 17, was reinstated, with the film featuring the studio's "first-ever on-screen kiss between two characters of the same gender" between Alisha Hawthorne and her wife Kiko.

After Lightyear performed poorly at the box office, Pixar was alleged to have attributed the financial failure to the same-sex kiss. This resulted in modifications being enforced during production of Inside Out 2 to make the character of Riley seem "less gay", to the point of making modifications to lighting in scenes in which she is seen interacting with her friend Val, despite Riley having not been intended to be gay in the first place. An anonymous source stated to IGN that many Pixar staff members "accepted the fact that we may never see a major gay character in a Pixar movie".

In November 2024, Polygon reported that the Moon Girl and Devil Dinosaur season 2 episode "The Gatekeeper", about Brooklyn facing discrimination for being a transgender girl, was shelved by Disney before it aired. Several crew members, like storyboarder Derrick Malick Johnson, asserted on social media that Disney decided not to air the episode because of "which party that won the recent election" which likely referred to the victory of Donald Trump and the Republican Party in the 2024 United States presidential election. Later reporting by Collider asserted the episode has been on hold for over a year, which had nothing to do with the election results, but that it was unclear if it "will ever be officially released." They also reported that the episode was leaked on YouTube and noted criticism of the decision to not release the episode by storyboarder Emmy Cicirega, Amphibia creator Matt Braly, indie animation writer Dave Capdevielle, and The Owl House creator Dana Terrace. James Whitbrook of io9, after reviewing the leaked footage, noted that "the episode is clearly not subtle" with its focus on Brooklyn and "the explicit prejudice she faces as a trans teen who wants to participate in school sports". Whitbrook reported that a Disney source claimed the intent of the hold was "to ensure material doesn't potentially push ahead discussions around social issues before families can have them themselves", however, Whitbrook also commented that "it would not be the first time Disney has capitulated to right-wing systems of power by censoring its own material". Despite being unreleased, the episode won a Velma Award, from the non-profit LGBT organization, The Rainbow Project, which was co-founded by Chris Nee, Kristi Reed, and Jeremy Blacklow.

On December 17, 2024, Deadline Hollywood reported that Disney removed a storyline related to a transgender character in an episode within a then-upcoming Pixar television series Win or Lose, with the company's spokesperson saying that "when it comes to animated content for a younger audience, we recognize that many parents would prefer to discuss certain subjects with their children on their own terms and timeline" while the character remains in the series, lines of dialogue that referenced gender identity were cut. It was also reported that the decision to cut this storyline had happened "several months ago". Chanel Stewart, the transgender actress who voices Kai, the character in question, criticized the decision, calling it "upsetting," disenheartening, and stated that "trans stories matter, and...deserve to be heard" and noted her character would be a "straight cis girl" instead. Following the announcement, a petition calling on Disney to reinstate the storyline garnered thousands of signatures. Another character that was censored was Hannah who used they/them pronouns in the original cut. It was later reported by the San Francisco Chronicle, in March 2026, that Pete Docter, chief creative officer of Pixar, had ordered the removal of the transgender storyline from Win or Lose while Elio was being reworked.

In July 2025, multiple insiders told The Hollywood Reporter that Elio, eponymous protagonist of the film with the same name, was originally a "queer coded character" which reflected the identity of Adrian Molina as an openly gay filmmaker and the film's first director, while others said the film wasn't a "coming out story," with the publication saying that Pixar executives, like Docter, pushed Elio to become "more masculine" and a scene suggesting he had a "male crush" was removed. The publication also noted that after Molina left the film, it was re-worked under new directors Madeline Sharafian and Domee Shi, with some expressing disappointment at changes to the film by these directors, feeling the film had been "destroyed" and was about "absolutely nothing." One artist who worked on the film stated that the studio's executives were "constantly sanding down" moments which alluded to Elio's queer sexuality, rather than from Disney itself.

In a March 2026 interview, Docter defended the removal of the LGBTQ storyline of from Elio, including reported scenes where Elio imagined living with his male crush and had a pink bike, saying "We're making a movie, not hundreds of millions of dollars of therapy" and asserted that Pixar had found that certain parents did not want entertainment to pressure them into having conversations they were not ready to have with their children, according to the Wall Street Journal. Following Molina's departure, Docter called for extensive changes to the film, which were made by Sharafian and Shi when the animation was mostly complete. These changes led to backlash among Pixar staff members during the film's production, disappointed others since Pixar had a "history of supporting LGBT employees," and led to further discouragement after removal of a transgender character from "Win or Lose."

In June 2026, it was reported that the Disney animated series Dragon Striker was banned in MENA region. Evan Valentine of ComicBook speculated that this was because the season one finale featured a same-sex relationship between characters Odward Stonegarden and Casper Ferreiro, and noted that the series would, according to Disney Television, air the MENA region "at a later date," implying the release has only been delayed.

In August 2026, it was reported that an episode, entitled "They're Gonna Love Me," of the fourth and final season of The Proud Family: Louder and Prouder was scrapped as one character, Michael Collins, coming out as non-binary, changing pronouns to "they/them" while a school administrator admonishes Collins for this change, removing them as school play director. The episode was later leaked online. It was later revealed that the episode was not "banned" but passed over "in favor of the holiday special" entitled "A Proud Family Wizmas."

=== Cancellations ===
In February 2021, Deadline reported that the film adaptation of Nimona was cancelled due to the shutdown of Blue Sky Studios. Webcomics commenter Gary Tyrrell criticized the decision, saying, "[Disney] could have allowed a very different kind of young heroine... I mourn for those who would have found a vision of themselves in an animated version". Sources told CBR that the film was "75% complete". Anonymous staffers at Blue Sky interviewed by Business Insider bemoaned the cancellation of the film, calling it "heartbreaking," arguing that the film "didn't look like anything else in the animated world," and saying that they believe it will never "be completed and released." A few staffers confirmed to BuzzFeed News that the film had an "I love you" scene between [Boldheart] and Goldenloin.

In June 2021, Mey Rude, a writer for Out, said she still held out "hope that this film...will find its way back to life somehow." In July 2021, Meggie Gates in Bitch, said the film would have been Disney's first "legitimately queer film" and could have been a turning point "for how the corporation handles queerness" but that the Disney chose to "bury its gays" by cancelling the film, a blow to queer Disney fans. Annapurna Pictures revived the film with the animation being finished by DNEG Animation, and released it on Netflix in 2023.

On October 5, 2021, in an AMA on Reddit, Dana Terrace, the creator of The Owl House, explained the show was cancelled not because of ratings or the COVID-19 pandemic, but rather because business people at Disney believed it did not fit "into the Disney brand." She stated that this was the case due to the serialized nature of the show and an audience which "skews older," rather than due to its LGBTQ+ representation, saying she wouldn't "assume bad faith" against those she works with in Los Angeles. She also noted that due to the pandemic, budgets were constrained, episodes were cut, and noted that she wasn't allowed to present a case for a fourth season, and said she believed there was a future for the show if Disney Television Studios had "different people in charge."

On December 11, 2020, a project by Lee Knox Ostertag, for Disney Television Animation under the name Neon Galaxy, was registered. In September 2024, Ostertag announced that Neon Galaxy, a series set "in the distant future," was not moving forward at Disney, noting that it had been cancelled a few months prior despite production work for four and a half years and positive response from "kids who saw materials in early demographic testing" and songs by Betty Who. He also noted that it is a "weird, bad time" in the U.S. animation industry, with difficulty in getting series approved, and hoped The Animation Guild could win gains from the Alliance of Motion Picture and Television Producers during negotiations for a new contract, and said that "for now, this is a farewell" for Neon Galaxy while adding "maybe one day I’ll be back."

In November 2024, following the leak of the shelved Moon Girl and Devil Dinosaur episode "The Gatekeeper", Ostertag speculated that Neon Galaxy was "killed" because two members of the main cast were openly transgender. In December 2025, in response to The Walt Disney Company inking a three-year licensing deal with Sora (OpenAI) for short AI generated videos on Disney+, Ostertag mentioned that Disney's legal department threatened him for sharing artwork from Neon Galaxy to the public.

== Awards ==
Some Disney animated series, with LGBTQ representation, have been nominated for awards. From 2018 to 2026, ten animated series were nominated for the GLAAD Media Award for Outstanding Kids and Family Programming: Doc McStuffins for the episode "The Emergency Plan" (2018), The Owl House (2021, 2022, 2023), Amphibia (2022, 2023), The Proud Family: Louder and Prouder (2023, 2024, 2026), Firebuds (2024, 2025, 2026), The Ghost and Molly McGee (2024), Hailey's On It! (2024, 2025), Moon Girl and Devil Dinosaur (2024, 2025, 2026)., Star Wars: Young Jedi Adventures (2025, 2026), Kiff (2025), Monsters at Work (2025) and Primos (2025). In 2024, Hailey's On It! became the first Disney animated series to win the award. In 2026, Firebuds won the GLAAD Media Award for Outstanding Children's Programming.

In 2022, The Proud Family: Louder and Prouder was nominated for the Outstanding Animated Series category at the 1st Children's and Family Emmy Awards, while the voice directors of Amphibia and The Proud Family: Louder and Prouder were nominated for the Outstanding Voice Directing for an Animated Series category. The previous year The Owl House was listed among the "Children's & Youth honorees" of the Peabody Awards.

In 2023, at the 2nd Children's and Family Emmy Awards, the Moon Girl and Devil Dinosaur series premiere won the award for Outstanding Animated Special, with the series also nominated for the "Outstanding Children's or Young Teen Animated Series" category along with Big City Greens. In addition, Moon Girl and Devil Dinosaur writers Lisa Muse Bryant, Jeffrey M. Howard, Kate Kondell, Liz Hara, Halima Lucas, Maggie Rose, and Taylor Vaughn Lasley were nominated for the "Outstanding Writing for an Animated Program" category. Sam Riegel was awarded the "Outstanding Voice Directing for an Animated Series" award for Moon Girl and Devil Dinosaur, while Eden Riegel was only nominated for The Ghost and Molly McGee. Kaz Aiwaza was awarded for Individual Achievement in Animation in Moon Girl and Devil Dinosaur and Tatiana Bull, Aaron Drown, and Jennifer Trujillo were awarded the Outstanding Casting for an Animated Program award for Moon Girl and Devil Dinosaur, with Tatiana Bull and Aaron Drown of The Proud Family: Louder and Prouder as a competitor, which was nominated. Sandra Powers, Ryan Burkhard, and Phil Lomboy were nominated for Outstanding Editing for an Animated Program for Moon Girl and Devil Dinosaur.

Also, in 2023, Strange World and Lightyear were nominated for the GLAAD Media Award for Outstanding Film – Wide Release. Previously, in 2022, Tim Evatt was nominated for the Art Directors Guild Award for Excellence in Production Design for an Animated Film for his art direction on the film Lightyear.

== See also ==
- Cartoon Network and LGBT representation
- Cross-dressing in film and television
- Netflix and LGBT representation in animation
- Nickelodeon and LGBT representation
- LGBTQ themes in Western animation
- Independent animation § Representations
- List of animated films with LGBT characters
- List of bisexual characters in animation
- List of cross-dressing characters in animated series
- List of fictional asexual characters
- List of fictional intersex characters
- List of fictional non-binary characters
- List of fictional pansexual characters
- List of fictional trans characters
- List of gay characters in animation
- List of lesbian characters in animation
- List of LGBT-related films by year
