= Netflix and LGBTQ representation in animation =

Netflix has contributed substantially to LGBTQ representation in animation. Lesbian, gay, bisexual, pansexual, asexual and transgender characters have appeared in various animated series, and some animated films, on the streaming platform. GLAAD described Netflix as a company taking "impressive strides in viewership and impact," when it came to LGBTQ representation. Scholars have stated that LGBTQ characters on streaming services, such as Netflix, "made more displays of affection" than on broadcast networks.

== Popularity of series ==
Before December 2023, Netflix had not released viewership numbers for its entire catalog, and only for select series and films. Even so, some described She-Ra and the Princesses of Power as "popular" or an "in-demand show" and Bojack Horseman as "successful". GLAAD continually praised Netflix for having the highest number of "LGBTQ regular and recurring characters," Some scholarship said that the streaming service, like Hulu and Amazon, caters to "niche audiences" and had more "displays of affection" than broadcast television.

== Cancellations and endings ==
Netflix has cancelled some shows with LGBTQ+ characters over the years, such as Tuca & Bertie, Q-Force, Hoops, BoJack Horseman, and Dead End: Paranormal Park.

In July 2019, it was revealed the streaming service was cancelling Tuca & Bertie despite "rave reviews," with creator Lisa Hanawalt blaming it on the service's algorithm not showing the show to the right audience, and said she hoped the show could find a new "home". The series later was picked by Adult Swim for a second season. Julia Alexander of The Verge, in describing the cancellation, stated that Netflix had become a "sea of content" and that shows were competing to find viewers while "the streamer’s biggest projects received top billing on the homepage."

In September 2019, Netflix announced that BoJack Horseman was cancelled, and that the final season would air in January 2020. In fall 2019, BoJack Horseman creator Raphael Bob-Waksberg made clear his disappointment at the cancellation, saying that at the previous model of the streaming service "was to give shows time to build," lamented that it was "a shame...they seem to have moved away from that model," but added that if his series had premiered on another network or at another time, they would not have "gotten the second season" and says they got "lucky." He also told Vulture that he was "amazed" the series had got that far, and that Netflix "got to do what’s right for them" in regard to Netflix's cancellation of the series.

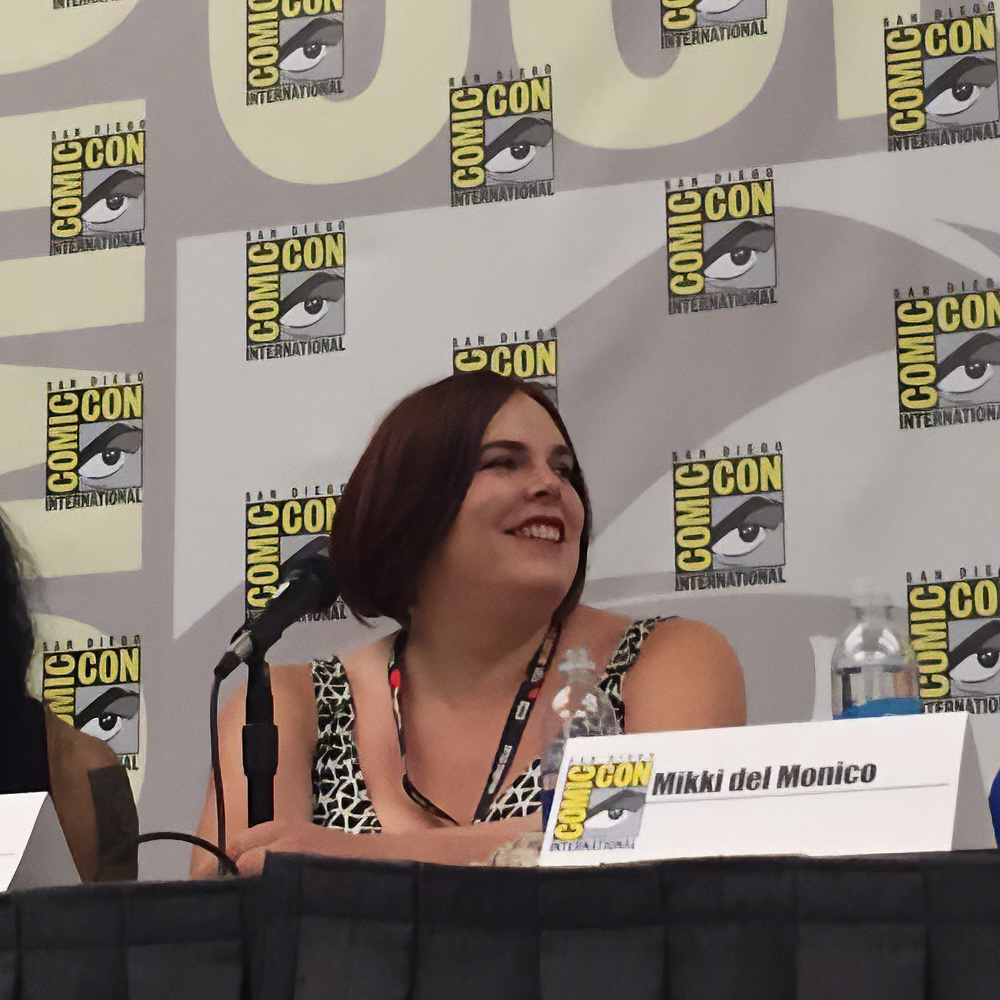
Television show-runner Shadi Petosky on a panel at San Diego Comic Con

In September 2019, due to the abrupt ending of Twelve Forever, Shadi Petosky, one of the executive producers, stated they will not be able to further explore protagonist Reggie Abbott as a "canon queer" character. Elsewhere, Petosky described Reggie as a queer character "coming to terms with her sexuality".

On December 8, 2020, Netflix canceled Hoops after one season. The series included a gay character named Scott on the school's basketball team.

On June 27, 2022, it was announced that Netflix cancelled Q-Force, an animated series about a group of LGBTQ superspies, after one season. Some described the cancellation as among "major losses for queer storytelling on television" and predicted a Peacock revival may be possible.

On January 13, 2023, Hamish Steele, creator of Dead End: Paranormal Park announced that Netflix had cancelled the series. Previously, Steele said he was grateful for showrunners who fought for LGBTQ characters in their shows, adding that there was "absolutely no pushback from Netflix about representation," while describing Barney as a trans male character.

== Representation ==
Animated series on Netflix have featured LGBTQ+ characters. Some praised depiction of asexuality lesbianism and homosexuality in BoJack Horseman. Others praised Rachel Bighead as a trans female character in Rocko's Modern Life: Static Cling, which was released in August 2019. The work was a TV movie and sequel to their 1993 series Rocko's Modern Life and the producers worked with GLAAD to ensure that the story of Rachel, as well as a plotline involving her coming out to her parents, Ed and Bev Bighead, was respectful to the LGBTQ+ community and fit within the show itself.

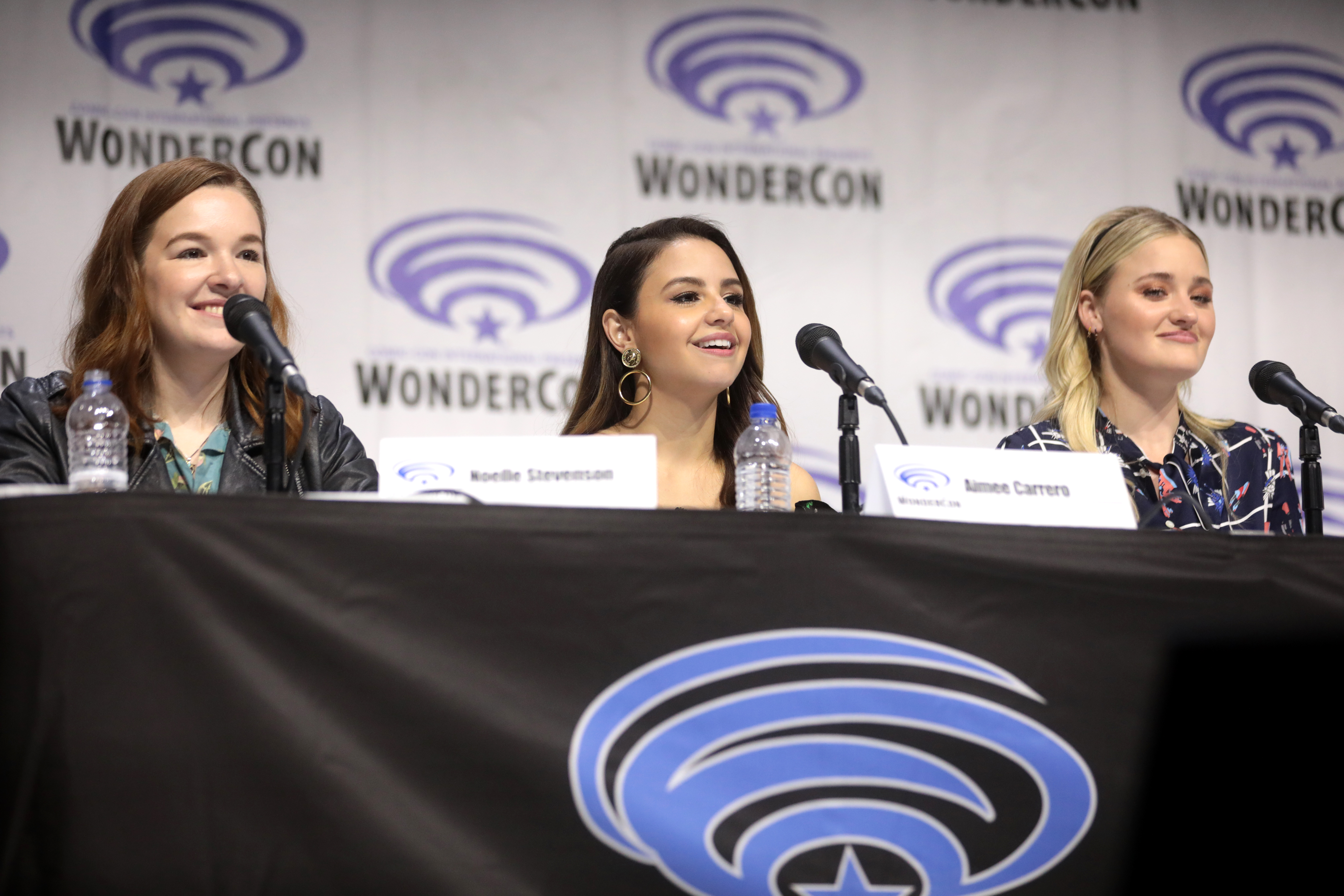
ND Stevenson, Aimee Carrero and AJ Michalka speaking at the 2019 WonderCon, for She-Ra and the Princess of Power, at the Anaheim Convention Center in Anaheim, California, in July 2019

In May 2020, ND Stevenson, the showrunner of She-Ra and the Princesses of Power stated that while the romantic relationship between Adora and Catra was planned from the show's conception, they were not sure how overt he could portray it. But throughout each release of the show's subsequent seasons, Stevenson would lay enough groundwork for the approval of the romance. By the time the final season had aired, Stevenson expressed that he was glad that he could finally talk about it, noting that the relationship between Adora and Catra was central to the final season and written in a "very, very textually romantic way". He later said that he had fought hard for Catra and Adora during the show's development. In an interview for Paper, Stevenson said that he and the show staff "fought very hard for the 'Princess Prom' episode", working to set up a "[queer] framework for the show" in order to normalize it "within the executive structure itself", and had hoped to garner support from its viewers.

In June 2020, Kipo and the Age of Wonderbeasts series creator Radford "Rad" Sechrist, and co-screenwriter Bill Wolkoff, confirmed that the characters Benson and Troy were gay, noting that when he had pitched the idea to the studio, Chief Creative Officer Peter Gal approved but instructed the production staff to have the character say the words "I'm gay," something that he and Bill were happy to hear to oblige. Reviewers noted the show's "casual queerness" praised the romance between Benson and Troy as "perfect" and "charmingly cute." In another interview, Wolkoff acknowledged that past coming-of-age stories "about kids being gay and dealing with that" often got pushback, but that in this case DreamWorks was open to it. He said that in this case, they got to tell the story they wanted, with DreamWorks supporting them from the beginning, and that they structured story without Benson having to deal with the real "extra weight of homophobia."

The Mitchells vs. the Machines, an animated film, premiered in Netflix in April 2021. The voice actor for one of the film's protagonists, Abbi Jacobson, has stated that Katie is "queer". In the film, Katie wears a rainbow pride flag pin and talks about it taking a while to figure herself out, and at the end of the film, she has a girlfriend at film school in Los Angeles named Jade. The film's writers, Michael Rianda and Jeff Rowe, wrote the character of Katie to be LGBT but without necessarily drawing attention to her sexuality as a lesbian.

Ridley Jones, which ran from July 2021 to March 2023, part of a slate of animated preschool series on the streaming service, with others including Spirit Rangers and Ada Twist, Scientist, of which Nee is the showrunner. includes Fred, a non-binary bison who prefers they/them pronouns, the first non-binary character in a kids show on Netflix. Fred is voiced by non-binary actor iris menas as confirmed by Nee.

=== Criticism ===
Voltron: Legendary Defender, which aired on Netflix from 2016 to 2018, which featured three gay characters was criticized for its treatment of LGBT characters, particularly over Adam's death that occurred in the later half of Season 7. Some claimed the show had followed a stereotype known as "burying that gay", prompting show-runner Joaquim Dos Santos to apologize to fans.

More controversy was aimed at the on-screen wedding between Shiro and Curtis, with several critics and viewers characterizing it as poor LGBT representation. Metadeen stated that making a "five-second blip of the wedding...come[s] off as a publicity stunt." On August 13, 2018, show-runner Joaquim Dos Santos posted an apology on his Twitter. He also acknowledged that there were boundaries in place as to how they could portray LGBT representation in the show. Fellow show-runner Lauren Montgomery also acknowledged the limitations regarding LGBT relationships behind the scenes in her apology, saying, "there's so much that I would do differently, but so little we could've done differently." The series had been described by GLAAD as "struggling" with Shiro's story, with the organization hoping for Shiro's further character development and "a happy ending."

In October 2018, a protagonist in Big Mouth, Jay Bilzerian, came out as bisexual. Over a year later, Ali, a pansexual character, was introduced. In the latter case, however, some criticized it as an oversimplification of the "relationship between private parts and gender identity," even as her existence was praised as putting the show ahead of "most television representations of sexual expression."

== Work conditions ==
On March 29, 2022, ND Stevenson, the showrunner and creator of She-Ra and the Princesses of Power said that the working conditions for the series were not ideal, saying that Netflix exploited the passion of those on the crew "as an excuse to underpay, understaff, and overwork," responding to a tweet from Jeff Bennett, a storyboarder and director for the series. Stevenson and Bennett both called on supporting The Animation Guild negotiators and workers in the animation industry in "their fight for better conditions."

== Awards ==
Many animated series on Netflix, with LGBTQ characters, have won or were nominated awards for their representation. At the 68th Writers Guild of America Awards, in 2015, the Bojack Horseman episode "Hank After Dark" was nominated for the Writers Guild of America Award for Television: Animation award. The next year, the episodes "Fish Out of Water" and "Stop the Presses" were nominated, with the latter winning the award. In 2017, the episode "Time's Arrow" was awarded. In 2019, the episode "A Horse Walks Into A Rehab" was nominated for the award, while in 2020, the episode "Xerox of a Xerox" won the award. From 2018 to 2026, seventeen animated series were nominated for the GLAAD Media Award for Outstanding Kids and Family Programming: She-Ra and the Princesses of Power (2018, 2019, 2020, 2021), Twelve Forever (2020), Kipo and the Age of Wonderbeasts (2021) Centaurworld (2022), Dead End: Paranormal Park (2023), The Dragon Prince (2023, 2024), Jurassic World Camp Cretaceous (2023), and Battle Kitty (2023), Strawberry Shortcake: Berry in the Big City (2024), Ada Twist, Scientist (2024), Princess Power (2024, 2025), Scott Pilgrim Takes Off, Ridley Jones (2024)., Carol & the End of the World (2025), The Dragon Prince (2025), Arcane (2025), Jurassic World: Chaos Theory (2025, 2026) and Long Story Short (2026) Also, the film Rocko's Modern Life: Static Cling was nominated in 2020. Of these nominees, She-Ra and the Princesses of Power was awarded in 2021, Dead End: Paranormal Park in 2023, Ada Twist, Scientist in 2024 and Jurassic World: Chaos Theory in 2025.

Some Netflix films were nominated for GLAAD Awards. Wendell & Wild was nominated for the GLAAD Media Award for Outstanding Film – Wide Release in 2023. The Mitchells vs. the Machines was nominated for the GLAAD Media Award for Outstanding Film – Wide Release in 2022. Nimona was nominated for GLAAD Media Award for Outstanding Kids & Family Programming (Animated) in 2024. None of the films were awarded. Also, in 2022, The Mitchells vs. the Machines was nominated for the American Cinema Editors Award for Best Edited Animated Feature Film. The previous year, Lindsey Olivares was nominated for the Art Directors Guild Award for Excellence in Production Design for an Animated Film for her art direction on the film.

In 2022, Q-Force was nominated for the Critics' Choice Television Award for Best Animated Series. Also in 2022, City of Ghosts won the award for Outstanding Animated Series category at the 1st Children's and Family Emmy Awards. At the same awards show, We the People won the award for the Outstanding Short Form Program category, Andy Walken won the award for Outstanding Younger Voice Performer in an Animated or Preschool Animated Program for voicing Young Durpleton on Centaurworld, Kristi Reed won for her voicing directing of Centaurworld, while David Errigo Jr. was nominated as Dudley on Ridley Jones. In 2023, Scott Pilgrim Takes Off was nominated for the Critics' Choice Television Award for Best Animated Series, with the winners presented as the 29th Critics' Choice Awards in 2024. Previously, in 2020, episodes of BoJack Horseman and Big Mouth were nominated for the American Cinema Editors Award for Best Edited Animation.

== See also ==
- LGBT representation in children's television
- Cartoon Network and LGBTQ representation
- Nickelodeon and LGBT representation
- Disney and LGBTQ representation in animation
- LGBTQ themes in Western animation
- LGBTQ themes in anime and manga
- Independent animation § Representations
- List of LGBT-related films by year
- Cross-dressing in film and television
- List of animated series with crossdressing characters
- List of animated films with LGBT characters
- List of lesbian characters in animation
- List of gay characters in animation
- List of bisexual characters in animation
- List of fictional pansexual characters
- List of fictional trans characters
- List of fictional non-binary characters
- List of fictional asexual characters
- List of fictional intersex characters
