= LGBTQ representation in children's television =

Aspect of children's television

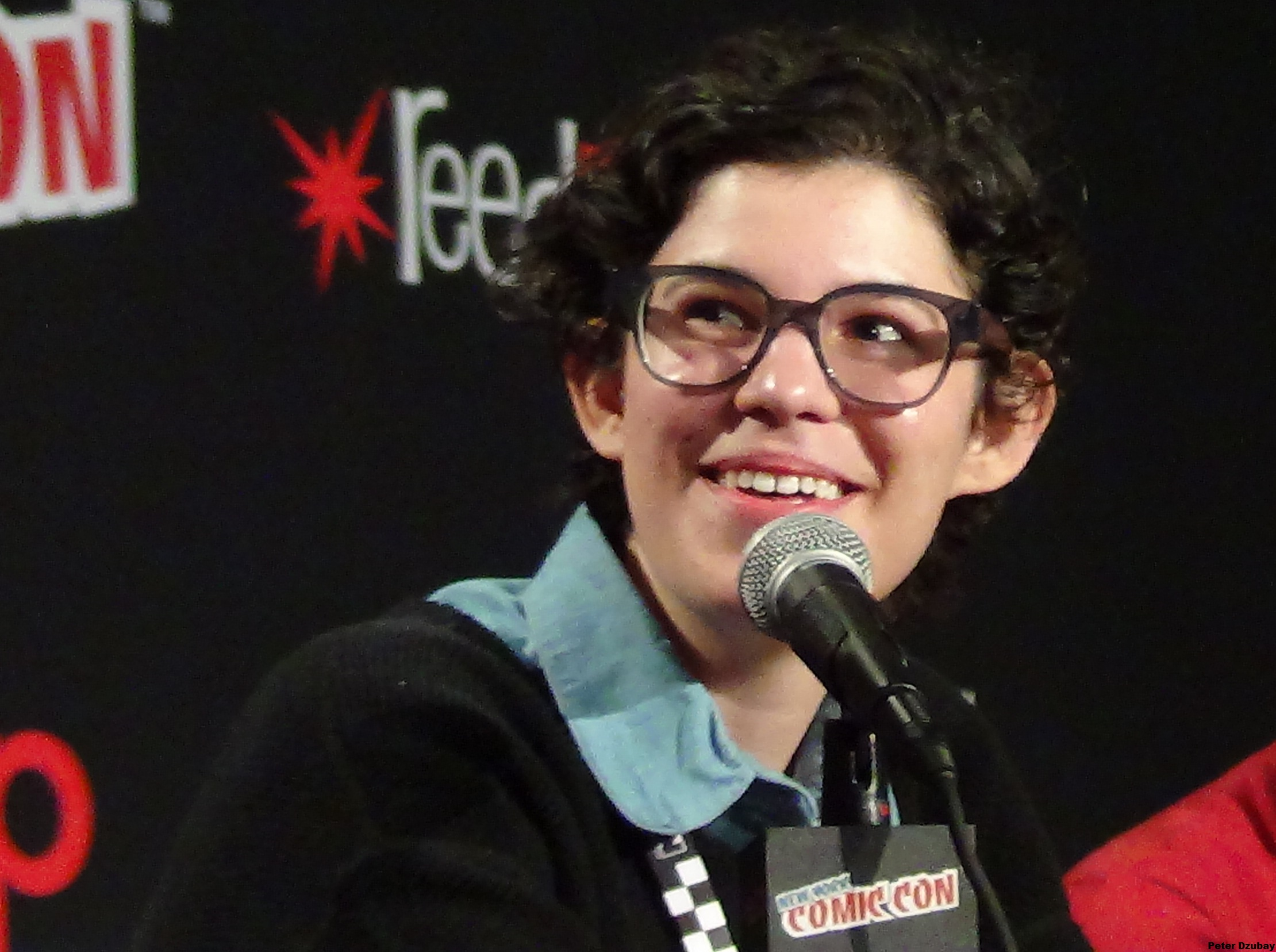
Rebecca Sugar, a creator devoted to creating LGBT children's media, speaking at New York Comic Con 2014

LGBT representation in children's television is representation of LGBT topics, themes, and people in television programming meant for children. LGBT representation in children's programming was often uncommon to non-existent for much of television's history up to the 2010s, but has significantly increased since then.

When Sailor Moon was released in the United States, elements of the story were removed because Optimum Productions, the Canadian company in charge of the English language product, claimed that some of the content "is not suitable for children." Early children's programming addressing LGBT-related subject matter in the United States includes two episodes of CBS Schoolbreak Special. "What If I'm Gay?" originally aired on March 31, 1987. In September 2007, Dottie's Magic Pockets became the first available show for children in gay and lesbian families.

== Representation ==
Various Cartoon Network series, notably Adventure Time and Steven Universe, have substantial LGBT representation in animation. She-Ra and the Princesses of Power showrunner ND Stevenson thanked Steven Universe creator Rebecca Sugar for "blazing the trail" for queer representation in children's animation.

Netflix has contributed substantially to LGBT representation in animation throughout the 2010s and 2020s. This includes series such as Kipo and the Age of Wonderbeasts, She-Ra, and Power Rangers Dino Fury.

In the second season finale of Wizards vs Aliens in 2013, the character Benny Sherwood uses Newton's third law of motion to come out, in response to his friend Tom wondering why he has never seen him date anyone, even the girls that seemingly like him in school. "For every action, there is an equal and opposite reaction, which makes me the equal and opposite of you...I'll go on a date one day...just not with her...and not with a girl."

The series finale of Nickelodeon's The Legend of Korra, in December 2014, showed Korra and Asami holding hands, showing they are in a relationship. As such, the show became one of the first western children's animation series to not only feature major LGBT characters, but also a lead LGBT character. In July 2019, Michael Dante DiMartino, one of the series creators, in an interview with EW, noted that while the show's crew had always believed Kyoshi was bisexual, her feelings toward women and men were only explored in the young adult novel and in the comics branching off of the series.

Nickelodeon's Hey Arnold! was confirmed to have two gay characters, in July 2016 by show creator Craig Bartlett: Eugene Horowitz and Mr. Robert Simmons. Neither identity was explicitly stated in the series. In 2019, Nickelodeon released Rocko's Modern Life: Static Cling, a television film and sequel to their 1993 series Rocko's Modern Life through Netflix. The producers worked with GLAAD to ensure that the transgender character, in the form of cartoonist frog Rachel Bighead (known as Ralph Bighead in the original series) as well as a plotline involving her coming out to her parents, Ed and Bev Bighead, was respectful to the LGBTQ+ community and fit within the show itself. In May 2021, Nickelodeon released a Blue's Clues & You! sing-along video on its YouTube channel that features drag queen Nina West hosting a pride parade. The animated short shows a variety of diverse animal families, including those with same-sex parents and non-binary characters.

Disney series have often featured LGBTQ characters in its programming, since the founding of the Disney Channel, although these depictions have often been limited or characters have been secondary, rather than primary, characters, like Sheriff Blubs and Deputy Durland in Gravity Falls, and a lesbian (and interracial) married couple in Doc McStuffins. The reboot The Proud Family: Louder and Prouder features an interracial gay couple and a character who is confirmed to be gender non-conforming and gay. The Owl House, during its series run, dropped subtext and hints that several characters, like Luz Noceda and Amity Blight, within the show are LGBTQ+, which has often either been confirmed in the show itself or on Dana Terrace's Twitter account. In 2017, Disney Channel in the United Kingdom aired a coming out scene on The Lodge, where Josh (Joshua Sinclair-Evans) explains to another character that girls are "not his type". The scene was the first coming out scene to be aired on a Disney Channel series. Also in 2017, Disney, the creators of Andi Mack, had the character Cyrus Goodman played by Joshua Rush come out as gay.

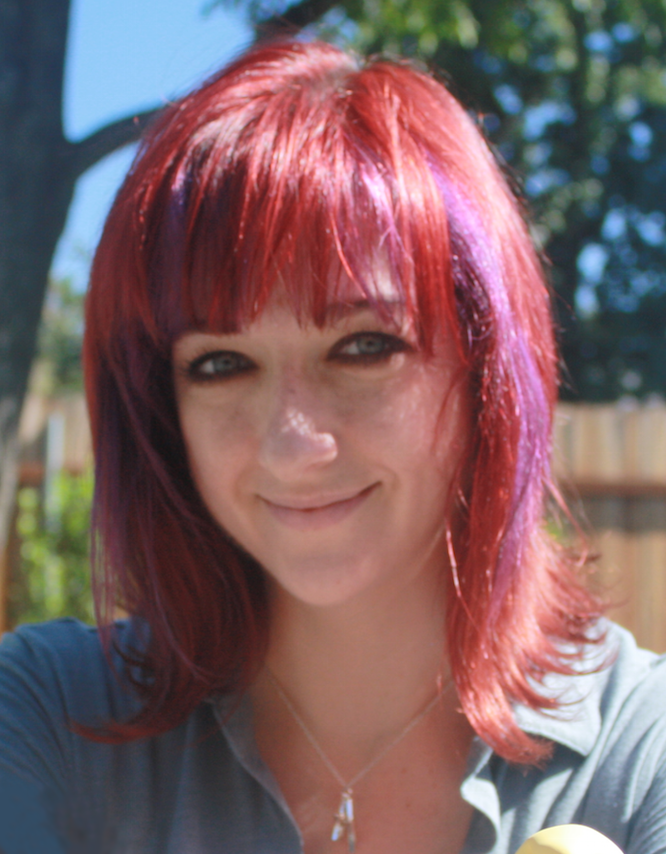
Lauren Faust in 2014 with SPFF Figures. Faust is the creator of My Little Pony: Friendship is Magic

Hulu and Discovery Family also had a range of representation. The Bravest Knight centers on Sir Cedric, his husband Prince Andrew (voiced by gay actors TR Knight and Wilson Cruz), and their daughter Nia. My Little Pony: Friendship is Magic featured Aunt Holiday and Auntie Lofty, who are aunts to the young pegasus Scootaloo and are her guardians while Scootaloo's parents are away. The pair were identified as a lesbian couple by one of the show runners, Michael Vogel. According to Vogel, he and writers Nicole Dubac and Josh Haber agreed to establish the two in their first appearance in the book as a lesbian couple, though without explicitly stating as such, so that they could establish this within the show itself. Also, in 2021, Kevin Sullivan, a story editor for The Loud House told Insider that no one stopped him from using the word "lesbian" as part of a storyline involving Luna and Sam, her crush, and that he was proud of the whole episode. Sullivan added that the fact Luna was not more directly identified as a lesbian was not due to pressure from Nickelodeon.

== Censorship ==
There has been long-standing censorship of LGBTQ content including in children's television. When Sailor Moon was released in the United States, elements of the story were removed because Optimum Productions, the Canadian company in charge of the English language product, claimed that some of the content "is not suitable for children." In November 1994, Byker Grove featured the first gay kiss on UK children's television. This scene caused outrage in the British tabloids and calls for producer Matthew Robinson to be sacked, but the BBC strongly backed the storyline, which received countrywide support from gay teenagers, many teachers, and parents.

When Nelvana licensed Cardcaptor Sakura in North America, dubbed the series into English with Ocean Studios featuring Carly McKillip as Sakura, and released it under the name Cardcaptors, the initial version of the dub covered all 70 episodes, although character names were changed, some Japanese text was changed to English, and subjects considered controversial at the time, such as same-sex relationships, were edited out. One of the censored themes was that of homosexual characters, including Tomoyo, who was changed from having a crush to being just a friend, and the gay relationship between Toya and Yukito, which was also portrayed as just friends.

In 2005, PBS planned to release an episode of the children's series Postcards from Buster, titled "Sugartime", in which the animated bunny, Buster Baxter, visits the children of two lesbian mothers. When education secretary Margaret Spellings stated disapproval of the planned episode, PBS withdrew plans for airing. Spellings believed the episode to be inappropriate for children as well as a misuse of governmental funding that the show had received. Apart from Reilly's statement, then-PBS chief operating officer Wayne Godwin said the episode brought up an issue that was "best left for parents and children to address together at a time and manner of their own choosing", while spokesperson Lea Sloan said it was "sensitive in today's political climate." Years later, Rebecca Sugar described Spellings' idea as "absurd," saying she recognized the challenges of creating LGBTQ+-friendly animation when she tried to enter the animation field. At the time, the episode was one of the earliest confirmed representations of LGBTQ people "in US animated children's TV."

In July 2016, The Loud House episode which introduced the interracial gay couple Howard and Harold McBride, was censored by a South African broadcaster, DStv despite the fact that it was met with "overwhelmingly positive reaction." Despite the positive reaction from its audience and parents on social media, conservative parents, with the help of conservative watch group One Million Moms, pushed back with a campaign calling for the episode to be cancelled. In addition, the creator of Steven Universe, Rebecca Sugar was told point-blank by executives that queer romance could have ended her show, Steven Universe. In 2020, Cartoon Network aired the final episodes of the Steven Universe epilogue miniseries Steven Universe Future. One year before, some Alabama broadcasters had banned the Arthur episode titled "Mr. Ratburn and the Special Someone", the Season 22 premiere, which featured Mr. Ratburn and Patrick marrying each other.

In October 2017, it was reported that a kiss between two female characters, Zarya Moonwolf and Kitty Boon, on the Nickelodeon show, Mysticons, was in danger of being cut. Despite this, the show showed the "development of a female-female romance," between Zarya, a main character, and her childhood friend, Kitty, known as "MoonBoon," culminating in romantic moments. Sean Jara added that while he was nervous and aware of possible roadblocks, Matt Ferguson, the show's director, supported it, as did his writing team, with Ferguson adding that pushback came from not from people who were "evil" but rather from those who were "trying to do the best job at their particular job." Abbey White of Insider reported that when the show's studio changed the series to center on four teenage girls, Jara brought in more women and queer writers to the show's writing team, who were "responsible for building out an arc between lesbian characters Zarya Moonwolf and Kitty Boon." Jara recalled that he sent in the script for a kiss of the two characters to the show's studios, and Nickelodeon, and fellow producers working on the show, but the moment never aired, despite support from Nickelodeon, because a partner was concerned that the storyline was not "age-appropriate" for young viewers.

In May 2021, in response to a fan, Shadi Petosky described to Insider the challenges in producing her Danger & Eggs which follows a "young masc lesbian," D.D. Danger, said that she felt emboldened when Amazon picked up the show, but noted that the inclusion of overt "queer themes and elements of LGBTQ culture," driven by a queer crew and cast, was a hard-fought battle with "little arguments, and battles, and suspensions" as the show was in production. For instance, she was told to use the term "Rainbow Parade" rather than use the word "Pride." Previously, in February 2018 said that the show was in limbo, with the loss of the crew, without "much concern or enthusiasm" about the show, saying it "just slipped through the cracks." She lamented that the show's fate is up the new executive team on the show and predicted the show would probably be cancelled as a result.

== Religious response ==
Some groups have criticized LGBTQ representation in children's television, including Christian fundamentalist organizations like Focus on the Family, American Family Association, and Traditional Values Coalition and socially conservative Parents Television Council.

The Traditional Values Coalition criticized a Nickelodeon program in June 2002 entitled Nick News Special Edition: My Family Is Different which featured children of gay and lesbian parents talking with children from households that oppose equal rights for gay and lesbian families, claiming it pushed a "pro-homosexual agenda" and was not suitable for children. The Parents Television Council also claimed they had no problem with same-sex parents but did not think it was appropriate for Nickelodeon's young target audience.

Focus on the Family, a Christian fundamentalist organization, and the American Family Association, also a Christian fundamentalist organization, claimed that SpongeBob in SpongeBob SquarePants was "gay" or "homosexual propaganda", joined by other organizations which said the same. In response, series creator Stephen Hillenburg described SpongeBob as asexual, not gay. In 2016, it was revealed that Hillenburg instructed those working on the show that SpongeBob should never have a romantic relationship, since he is asexual (as all real-life sea sponges are) and is too innocent for it.

In 2020, One Million Moms, a project of American Family Association, condemned an episode of Clifford the Big Red Dog aired on Amazon Prime Video and PBS Kids, titled "Dogbot", which featured Dr. and Rayla Mulberry, the two moms of Samantha Mulberry. Six years prior, One Million Moms and Family Research Council launched an email campaign against an episode of Good Luck Charlie which debuted the channel's first lesbian couple on January 26, 2014. In May 2022, the Peanuts Mother's Day special Snoopy Presents: To Mom (and Dad), With Love, which features a reference to same-sex couples due to the line "some kids have two moms", received backlash from conservative Christians.

In 2023, the PBS Kids series Work It Out Wombats!, which features Duffy and Leiko, the moms of Louisa, aired. The series caused controversy among anti-LGBT groups and Governor of Oklahoma, Kevin Stitt vetoed a measure to provide funding to Oklahoma Educational Television Authority for airing Work It Out Wombats! and Clifford the Big Red Dog.

== Awards ==
Many children's television series have won or were nominated awards for their representation. In April 2018, the GLAAD Media Award for Outstanding Kids and Family Programming was first given at the 29th GLAAD Media Awards to Andi Mack, a comedy-drama television series that aired on Disney Channel. Concerning the creation of this category, GLAAD CEO Sarah Kate Ellis stated that it was added to "raise the bar for current and future LGBTQ inclusion in this hugely popular and impactful genre", arguing about the importance of younger individuals, that are "coming out earlier and in greater numbers, [to] see their lives and experiences reflected in thoughtful, loving, and affirming ways". Throughout the award's history, there have only been two instances where a tie occurred: in 2020 where Hulu's The Bravest Knight and Disney+'s High School Musical: The Musical: The Series won, and again the following year with Hulu's First Day and Netflix's She-Ra and the Princesses of Power winning. At the 34th GLAAD Media Awards in 2023, the award was split into Animated and Live Action categories.

In 2020, the Arthur episode entitled "Mr. Ratburn and the Special Someone", the Season 22 premiere, was nominated for a GLAAD Media Award. In 2021, the Clifford the Big Red Dog episode "Dogbot" won for was nominated for a GLAAD Media Award. Also that year, the Sesame Street episode "Family Day" won a GLAAD award for Outstanding Children's Programming. They returned in the season 53 episode "Family Picnic" which was nominated for a GLAAD award for Outstanding Children's Programming.

In 2022, Power Rangers Dino Fury won a GLAAD Award for Outstanding Kids and Family Programming. The same year, the Madagascar: A Little Wild episode "Whatever Floats Your Float" was nominated for a GLAAD Award for Outstanding Children's Programming. In 2023, the series was nominated again for Outstanding Kids and Family Programming. Also, The Bravest Knight won a GLAAD award tied with High School Musical: The Musical: The Series.

== See also ==
- Disney and LGBT representation in animation
- Netflix and LGBT representation in animation
- Cartoon Network and LGBT representation
- Nickelodeon and LGBT representation
- Media portrayal of LGBT people
- LGBTQ themes in Western animation
- LGBTQ themes in anime and manga
