= Cartoon Network and LGBTQ representation =

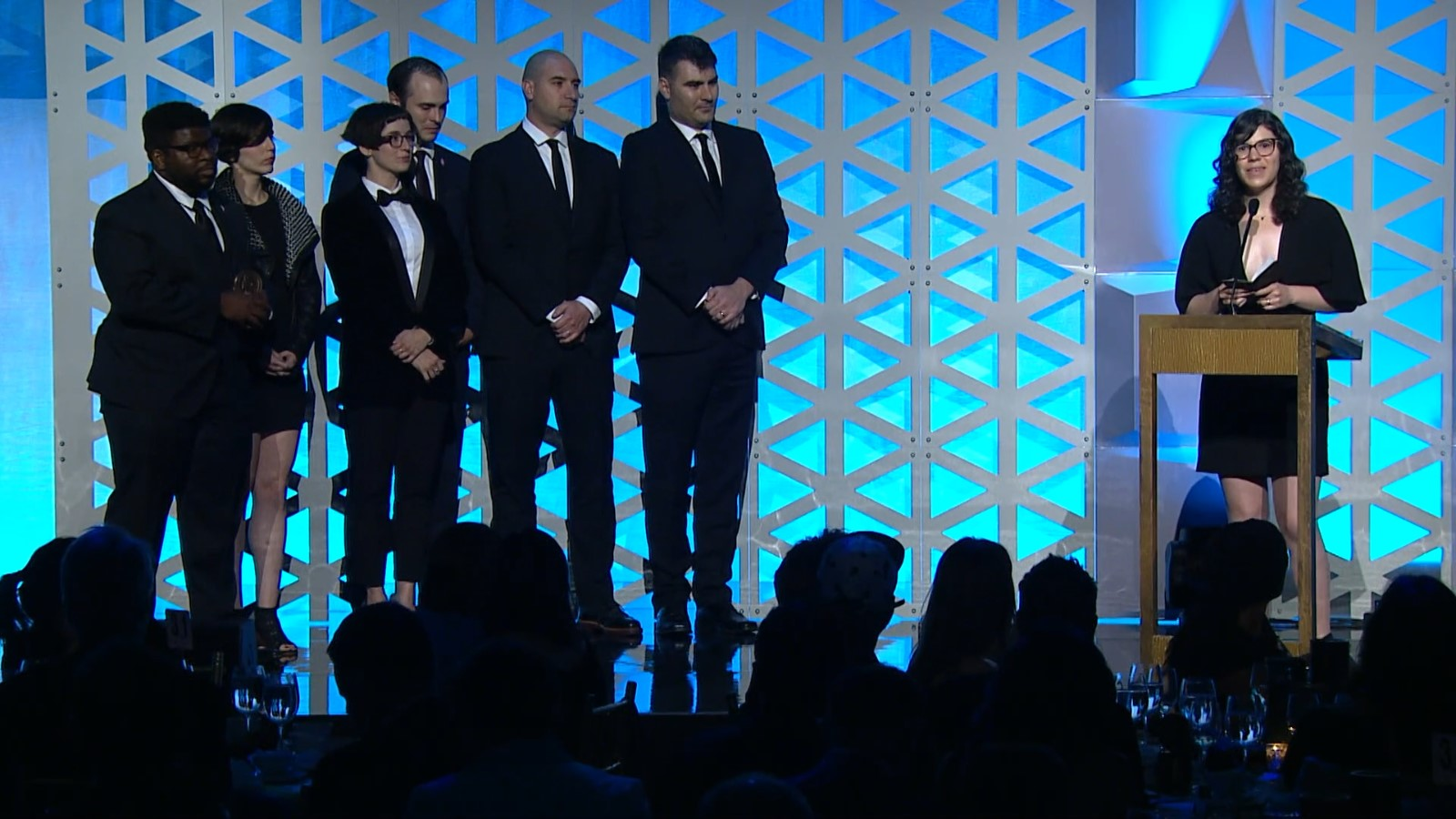
Rebecca Sugar gives an acceptance speech at the 78th annual Peabody Awards in July 2019

Cartoon Network, an American TV channel which launched in 1992, and Adult Swim, its adult-oriented nighttime programming block which launched in 2001, has regularly featured lesbian, gay, bisexual, transgender, and queer (LGBTQ) characters in its programming. Over the channel's run, there has been several negative issues surrounding censorship and cancellation because of LGBTQ connotations within its TV shows with characters and their creators.

Often, conservatives have stood against inclusion of LGBTQ relationships represented in children's media, including on Cartoon Network. This resulted in the creation of queer coded characters early the channel's run such as The Oblongs, Time Squad, and Space Ghost Coast to Coast, due to broadcast restrictions because of regional laws, contracts with production companies, and religious beliefs.

Other shows, like Final Space and Mission Hill, have been cancelled or had banned episodes. There have been several series with positive LGBTQ+ representation, including Adventure Time, Summer Camp Island, Craig of the Creek, and Steven Universe, while creators have often faced challenges. Some Cartoon Network series have garnered awards for their depiction of LGBTQ characters and themes, such as Steven Universe, Adventure Time, Craig of the Creek, Summer Camp Island, Adventure Time: Distant Lands, and Let's Go, Bananas! and films like Steven Universe: The Movie and Trick or Treat Scooby-Doo!.

== Representation ==
=== Queer coding ===
Some Cartoon Network series have included coded characters. For instance, The Oblongs, which aired from 2001 to 2002, features Biff who is implied to be gay. He was confirmed to be gay in a bonus feature from The Oblongs Complete Series DVD. Additionally, in 2012, Mark Hamill, the voice actor of Larry 3000 in Time Squad implied that Larry could easily have been interpreted as gay, due to his femininity and presentation as the "gay best friend" to Cleopatra in "Shop like an Egyptian", even though Larry has stated on multiple occasions he dislikes humans in general. Hamill also described Larry as "fierce" and "flamboyant".

Space Ghost Coast to Coast included a gay character. On December 25, 1994, Lokar, a locust-like alien and member of the Council of Doom, was introduced in the Space Ghost Coast to Coast Christmas special A Space Ghost Christmas. Supplementary material for the series had Lokar refer to himself as a confirmed bachelor while an article on the official Cartoon Network website featured a reference to a slang word for gay sex. His sexuality was confirmed in audio commentaries for the Space Ghost Coast to Coast Volume 2 DVD and it was revealed that Lokar died at some point during the series. However, this was eventually contradicted when Lokar returned in Season 11 in which he is shown to be alive and well.

Multiple scholars have analyzed how Steven Universe creates queer representation, many focusing on how its specific animation techniques represent queerness and its fluidity through character design and movement. In March 2020, Peridot, a character in Steven Universe, was confirmed by storyboarder Maya Peterson as asexual and aromantic. She said this despite her reservations that she is only a secondary creator on the show, pleasing fans. However, before and after this point, fans had shipped Peridot with various other characters, specifically Lapis Lazuli and Amethyst, with some reviewers seeing Peridot and Lapis in a "close, loving relationship".

=== Positive representation ===
Many Cartoon Network series have included LGBTQ+ representation. For instance, Superjail!, which aired from 2008 to 2014 on Adult Swim, had two gay characters: Jean Baptiste Le Ghei and Paul Guaye. In an interview with the creators of the show, co-creator Christy Karacas called them well-rounded characters, who are a couple, with Paul as more feminine and intelligent than Jean who is "the bad boy".

Summer Camp Island, which ran from July 2018 to August 2023, had various LGBTQ characters, such as Puddle, a non-binary alien who uses they/them pronouns, and their husband Alien King, who is the king of their planet. Craig of the Creek confirmed in December 2019 that the show had a non-binary character named Angel José. Their original voice actor, Angel Lorenzana, an agender storyboard artist for the show who also uses they/them pronouns, confirmed this.

In May 2020, DC Super Hero Girls series creator Lauren Faust said that everyone was "on board with this idea" of Jessica Cruz having two mothers, and that she was glad it was approved. Later, in July 2020, Tony Cervone, a producer of Scooby Doo! Mystery Incorporated stated that Velma Dinkley was a lesbian. James Gunn, who wrote the screenplays of Scooby-Doo and Scooby-Doo 2: Monsters Unleashed, concurred, stating that Velma was "explicitly gay". She has feelings for another woman, Marcie "Hot Dog Water" Fleach.

In December 2020, Amy Friedman, head of programming for Cartoon Network and HBO Max Kids & Family, stated that they are looking "at ourselves across the inclusion and equity spectrum", including the LGBTQ+ community, to evaluate projects in production, development, and post-greenlighting.

=== Challenges faced by creators ===
Creators of Cartoon Network series have occasionally talked about facing challenges. On May 18, 1996, Silver Spooner, the sidekick to Barbequor, appeared in an episode of Dexter's Laboratory titled "Dial M for Monkey: Barbequor". Both characters are parodies of Silver Surfer and Galactus. The episode was later banned; while some said this was because Silver Spooner was a stereotype of gay men, with complaints to that effect after it aired, others said it had more to do with copyright infringement as the estate of Jack Kirby threatened to sue Cartoon Network over the parody character. The episode was, in later broadcasts, and on its Season 1 DVD (Region 1), replaced with "Dexter's Lab: A Story", an episode from season two.

Rebecca Sugar, creator of Steven Universe, was told by executives that the inclusion of a central queer romance could have ended her show. At the time the wedding episode of Steven Universe was first drafted, gay marriage was not yet legal in most of the United States. Previously, the series was said to be a "strong champion...for LGBT representation" as was Adventure Time.

In October 2014, Spencer Rothbell, a writer, head of storywriting, and voice actor of multiple characters, for the show Clarence, said that they had to change a scene in the episode "Neighborhood Grill", which showed two gay characters after pushback from Cartoon Network executives. According to Rothbell, the original scene showed the two characters kissing on the lips, noting that "originally the guy had flowers and they kissed on the mouth." Later he lamented that the scene in the episode is "better than nothing", adding that "maybe one day the main character can be gay and it won't be a big deal."

In the summer of 2018, Steven Universe would make headlines with a gay wedding between two characters: Ruby and Sapphire, challenging Cartoon Network's history of "not overtly depicting same-sex marriage" as Sugar struggled to get any LGBTQ+ representation on the show, with the network ultimately accepting her reasoning. When she originally pitched the Steven Universe episode with a lesbian wedding, "Reunited", she encountered challenges presenting it to the Cartoon Network. Sugar was able to convince network officers that the wedding was organic to the show's development and a natural progression of Ruby and Sapphire's relationship. When the wedding episode (a double episode titled "Reunited") aired in 2018, network policy progressed. Scorcher noted that it became standard policy for the network to treat homosexual relationships like heterosexual relationships.

The episode, "Reunited", which aired on July 6, which she and the crew had worked on for years, was praised as an example of the network's frank portrayal of "sexuality and gender identity in children's programming", and it was positively received by the LGBTQ+ community and fans. This episode made Steven Universe the first kid's show on U.S. television to feature a lesbian wedding. The creator of Gravity Falls, Alex Hirsch, believed that because of this episode, it meant that Sugar was moving everyone in kid's programming forward in terms of LGBTQ+ representation. ND Stevenson praised the episode as "bold and courageous", serving as a moment which "knocked down so many walls" for other storytellers.

In September 2018, Princess Bubblegum and Marceline kissed in the Adventure Time finale, "Come Along with Me". However, the kiss was not scripted, as showrunner Adam Muto admitted. It was only added after a storyboard artist, Hanna K. Nyström, advocated for it. Previously, some of those behind the show played down the relationship. Some reviewers had hoped that "queer cartoon subtext" turns into "a queer cartoon subplot" or even a main plot in the future, and pointed to the Adventure Time Presents Marceline and the Scream Queens comic, created as part of the franchise, as fleshing out this relationship.

In March 2020, Rob Sorcher, chief content officer at Cartoon Network, spoke about the factors that go into content decisions for storylines. One important factor to consider was that Steven Universe aired in nearly 200 countries that had culturally conservative audiences. A common challenge when designing kids' animations and cartoons is considering conservative and religious audiences who will often vocalize backlash on non-traditional storylines. Sorcher explained, "On a personal level, as a gay executive, I was taking extra pains to be sure that inside my company, I'm being completely neutral – really listening to all the business issues going on around the world," Sorcher says. "And that there's not the optics of me coming in with an 'agenda' to drive through the content."

== Censorship ==
The now-banned Cow and Chicken episode "Buffalo Gals" aired on June 27, 1998. It only aired once, as frequent complaints prevented future airings. Complaints were made about its overt innuendos, frequent double entendres, and lesbian stereotypes. It no longer airs on television and has been replaced in future reruns with "Orthodontic Police".

On June 18, 2015, the Steven Universe episode "We Need To Talk" was released and featured a dance between two female characters: Pearl and Rose Quartz. Cartoon Network UK has been allegedly found to omit scenes where the pair danced and appeared to be very intimate. This tweak in the episode diverted the symbolism of the scene from a romantic attraction to a friendly one. The UK network recognized the importance of a rating in the US broadcast system for shows like Steven Universe, which is PG (Parental Guidance Necessary). They further elucidate their defense in a statement: "In the UK, we have to ensure everything on air is suitable for kids of any age at any time. We do feel that the slightly edited version is more comfortable for local kids and their parents.”

In the Adventure Time episode "What Was Missing" was posted and subsequently taken down from the Mathematical YouTube channel, a channel that shows the behind the scenes of Adventure Time. In this episode, Adventure Time has been forced to maintain its depiction of Princess Bubblegum and Marceline's relationship less than explicit. Fred Seibert, the producer, explained in a statement: "In trying to get the show's audience involved we got wrapped up by both fan conjecture and spicy fanart and went a little too far. Neither Cartoon Network nor the Adventure Time crew had anything to do with putting up or taking down our latest re-cap. The episode "What was Missing" remains a terrific short and will be shown again and again just like any other Adventure Time episode."

Cartoon Network also censored the first gay kiss that would have appeared on the show Clarence. The show's writer and voice actor, Spencer Rothbell, confirmed the censorship on Twitter, claiming that one of the men originally held flowers and kissed another on the mouth. The Cartoon Network representative had no comment on the alteration of this episode.

== Cancellations ==
Mission Hill aired on The WB from 1999 to 2000 and Adult Swim in 2002. It featured Gus Duncz and Wally Langford, a gay elderly couple in their late 60s. As a result the series won an award from GLAAD for this representation, with some arguing that the series was "prematurely axed".

In May 2021, in the Final Space episode, "Forgiveness", Ash Graven meets a genderless being named Evra, voiced by Jasmin Savoy Brown. Evra becomes Ash's friend and helps her "take her anger out", with both sitting and watching a formation of lights like the aurora borealis together. Her relationship with Evra makes clear her sexual orientation as a lesbian woman, In June 2021, Olan Rogers, in a podcast about the episode "Forgiveness" that David Sacks, who wrote the episode, came from a place of "two souls connecting to each other" and noted that if the show had a fourth season, they would have expanded on the relationship between Evra and Ash. However, the series, which aired on Adult Swim, was cancelled on September 10, 2021, before it could ever happen.

Tuca & Bertie included a pansexual character, Tuca Toucan. In season 2, Tuca was in a same-sex relationship with Kara, a seagull, but they broke up. The series was cancelled after two seasons. Tuca and Bertie was originally released on Netflix and was cancelled after one season.

== Awards ==
Some Cartoon Network animated series, with LGBTQ representation, have been nominated for awards. In 2012, 2013, 2014, and 2019, Adventure Time was nominated for the Critics' Choice Television Award for Best Animated Series. In 2021, Harley Quinn was nominated for the award and would be nominated again in 2023.

From 2018 to 2026, seven animated series were nominated for the GLAAD Media Award for Outstanding Kids and Family Programming: Steven Universe (2018, 2019, 2021), Adventure Time (2019), Craig of the Creek (2021, 2023, 2024), Summer Camp Island (2021, 2022, 2024), Trick or Treat Scooby-Doo! (2023), Let's Go, Bananas! (2025) and Adventure Time: Fionna and Cake (2026). Also, Steven Universe: The Movie was nominated in 2020 and the Adventure Time: Distant Lands episode "Obsidian", centering on the relationship between Princess Bubblegum and Marceline the Vampire Queen, was nominated for the same GLAAD award, in 2021.

Of these nominees, Steven Universe was given the award in 2019 and Adventure Time: Fionna and Cake in 2026. Additionally, the Adventure Time: Distant Lands episode "BMO" won a Kidscreen Award for Best One-Off, Special or TV Movie, in 2021. Previously, BMO was confirmed as a genderfluid character. The episode also featured Y5, an anthropomorphic rabbit and teenage scientist between age 11 and 13 who lives in The Drift, who chooses her new name. Voice actress Glory Curda later argued that Y5's story has a lot of context and is representative of coming out into your own identity and defining yourself with whatever terms are comfortable.

In 2023, at the 2nd Children's and Family Emmy Awards, for Craig of the Creek writers, Matt Burnett, Ben Levin, Jeff Trammell, Dashawn Mahone, Najja Porter, Deena Beck, and Ashleigh Hairston, were nominated for the "Outstanding Writing for an Animated Program" category.

== See also ==
- Disney and LGBTQ representation in animation
- Netflix and LGBTQ representation in animation
- Nickelodeon and LGBTQ representation
- LGBTQ representation in children's television
- LGBTQ themes in Western animation
- LGBTQ themes in anime and manga
- Independent animation § Representations
- List of LGBTQ-related films by year
- Cross-dressing in film and television
- List of cross-dressing characters in animated series
- List of animated films with LGBTQ characters
- List of lesbian characters in animation
- List of gay characters in animation
- List of fictional trans characters
- List of fictional intersex characters
- List of fictional non-binary characters
- List of bisexual characters in animation
- List of fictional pansexual characters
- List of fictional asexual characters
