= Ah! My Goddess season 1 =

First season of the Oh My Goddess! anime series

The cover of the first English DVD compilation released by Media Blasters on September 27, 2005

Ah! My Goddess is an anime television series directed by Hiroaki Gōda, animated by Anime International Company, and produced by Tokyo Broadcasting System (TBS). Composed by Himaguchi Shiro, the music was produced by Half H•P Studio with Iwanami Miwa as music director. The series was coordinated by both Hiroaki Gōda and You Watanabe, with Matsubara Hidenori as character designer. The series is based on the manga series Oh My Goddess! by Kōsuke Fujishima, using material from the first 20 volumes of the series over 24 episodes. The series focuses on Keiichi Morisato, a college student who accidentally summons a goddess, Belldandy, and wishes for her to remain with him forever. The season began broadcasting in Japan on TBS on January 7, 2005, and ended its run on July 8, 2005. Bandai Visual released the episodes in Japan between April 22, 2005, and November 25, 2005, as eight DVD compilations each containing three episodes. The two original video animations (OVAs), which had not been broadcast, were released on a special DVD on December 23, 2005. In Region 1, the anime was licensed to Media Blasters. Six DVD compilations, containing all twenty-six episodes, were released by Media Blasters from September 27, 2005, and July 11, 2006. Each DVD contained four episodes, excluding the first two, which contained five each. A premium complete season box set was released on November 7, 2006; the regular set followed on November 27, 2007. MVM Films distributed the series in the United Kingdom, with the individual volumes released between February 5, 2007, and December 3, 2007, in six similar DVD compilations. The box set followed on July 7, 2008. Madman Entertainment distributed the series in Australia, with the six individual volumes released between July 26, 2006, and December 6, 2006. The DVD collection containing all 26 episodes was released on October 10, 2007.

Three pieces of theme music were used throughout the series. The opening theme, titled "Open Your Mind" (〜小さな羽根ひろげて〜, Chiisana Hane Hirogete), was performed by Yoko Ishida. Ishida also sang the first ending theme, "Negai" (願; 'Wish'), used for the first 12 episodes, the special episode and episode 24. The second ending theme, used for the remainder of the series except episode 24, is "Wing" performed by Yoko Takahashi.

== Episode list ==
No.	Title	Animation Director	Screenwriter	Original release date	Refs
1	"Ah! You're a Goddess?"; Transliteration: "Aa! Kimi wa Megami-sama?" (Japanese: ああっキミは女神さまっ?)	Hiroaki Gōda	Hiroaki Gōda	January 6, 2005	
2	"Ah! Those Who Believe Shall Find Salvation?"; Transliteration: "Aa! Shinjiru Mono wa Tsuwareru?" (Japanese: ああっ信じる者は救われるっ?)	Hiroshi Ōshita	Yoh Watanabe	January 13, 2005	
3	"Ah! Apprenticeship, Home, and the Goddess!"; Transliteration: "Aa! Shugyō to Wagaya to Megami-sama!" (Japanese: ああっ修行と我が家と女神さまっ)	Nonaka Takuya	Yoh Watanabe	January 20, 2005	
4	"Ah! The Queen and the Goddess!"; Transliteration: "Aa! Joō-sama to Megami-sama!" (Japanese: ああっ女王さまと女神さまっ)	Ryuichi Kimura	Jukki Hanada	January 27, 2005	
5	"Ah! Living Under One Roof Together!"; Transliteration: "Aa! Hitotsu Yane no Shita de!" (Japanese: ああっひとつ屋根の下でっ)	Yoshiyuki Asai	Chabō Higurashi	February 3, 2005	
6	"Ah! A Blessing in Every Bargain?"; Transliteration: "Aa! Horidashimono ni Megumi Ari?" (Japanese: ああっ掘り出しものに恵アリっ?)	Hirotaka Endō	Yoh Watanabe	February 10, 2005	
7	"Ah! Where to Confess One's Love!"; Transliteration: "Aa! Omoi Tsutaeru Bashō!" (Japanese: ああっ想い伝える場所っ)	Teragijin Hitoaki	Jukki Hanada	February 17, 2005	
8	"Ah! Can You Pass the Love Test With Those Low Scores!"; Transliteration: "Aa! Hensachi Sanjū kara no Ren'ai Juken!" (Japanese: ああっ偏差値30からの恋愛受験っ)	Mio Takatori	Chabō Higurashi	February 24, 2005	
9	"Ah! The Queen and the Goddess's Secret!"; Transliteration: "Aa! Joō-sama to Megami no Himitsu!" (Japanese: ああっ女王さまと女神のヒミツっ)	Yoshihiko Iwata	Yoh Watanabe	March 3, 2005	
10	"Ah! Can the Auto Club Triumph?"; Transliteration: "Aa! Jidōshabu wa Katemasu ka?" (Japanese: ああっ自動車部は勝てますかっ?)	Teragijin Hitoaki	Jukki Hanada	March 10, 2005	
11	"Ah! A Demon has Come and is Creating Calamity!"; Transliteration: "Aa! Akuma ga Kitarite Wazawai o Nasu!" (Japanese: ああっ悪魔が来たりて災いを成すっ)	Yoshiyuki Asai	Chabō Higurashi	March 17, 2005	
12	"Ah! Compare and Contrast Goddesses and Queens?"; Transliteration: "Aa! Megami to Joō o Tenbin ni Kakete?" (Japanese: ああっ女神と女王を天秤にかけてっ?)	Yoshihiko Iwata	Yoh Watanabe	March 24, 2005	
12.5	Transliteration: "Aa! Megami to Kōkan Nikki?" (Japanese: ああっ女神と交換日記っ?)	Hiroaki Gōda	Yoh Watanabe	March 31, 2005	^{[A]}
13	"Ah! Who Does Big Sister Belong To?"; Transliteration: "Aa! Onee-sama wa Dare no Mono?" (Japanese: ああっお姉さまっは誰のモノっ?)	Hirotaka Endō	Jukki Hanada	April 7, 2005	
14	"Ah! Teaching a Lesson Called Competition!"; Transliteration: "Aa! Taiketsu to Iu Na no Kyōiku Jisshū!" (Japanese: ああっ対決という名の教育実習っ?)	Teragijin Hirotaka	Aoshima Takashi	April 14, 2005	
15	"Ah! My Heart Was Stolen By a Goddess!"; Transliteration: "Aa! Megumi ni Kokoro Ubawarete!" (Japanese: ああっ女神に心奪われてっ)	Ryuichi Kimura	Chabō Higurashi	April 21, 2005	
16	"Ah! Catastrophe Arrives. An Auspicious Sign Stands?"; Transliteration: "Aa! Wazawai Kitarite Chabashira Tatsu?" (Japanese: ああっ災い来たりて茶柱立つっ?)	Yoshiyuki Asai	Aoshima Takashi	April 28, 2005	
17	"Ah! What Are Ability and Effort?"; Transliteration: "Aa! Sainō to Doryoku tte, Nan Desu ka?" (Japanese: ああっ才能と努力って何ですかっ?)	Hiroaki Tomita	Jukki Hanada	May 5, 2005	
18	"Ah! Confess Your Feelings Under the Moon?"; Transliteration: "Aa! Unmei no Kokuhaku wa Tsuki no Shita de?" (Japanese: ああっ運命の告白は月の下でっ?)	Hirotaka Endō	Yoh Watanabe	May 12, 2005	
19	"Ah! Don't Look At Me Like That?"; Transliteration: "Aa! Sonna Hitomi de Mitsumenaide?" (Japanese: ああっそんな瞳でみつめないでっ?)	Teragijin Hirotaka	Chabō Higurashi	May 19, 2005	
20	"Ah! Save the Goddess, If You're a Man!?"; Transliteration: "Aa! Megami o Sukue! Otoko Nara!?" (Japanese: ああっ女神を救えっオトコならっ?)	Yoshihiko Iwata	Jukki Hanada	May 26, 2005	
21	"Ah! The One I Yearn For Is A White-Winged Angel!"; Transliteration: "Aa! Akogare wa Shiroi Tsubasa no Tenshi!" (Japanese: ああっ憧れは白い翼の天使っ)	Akira Katō	Aoshima Takashi	June 2, 2005	
22	"Ah! A Devil's Whisper, Along With a Pot?"; Transliteration: "Aa! Akuma no Sasayaki wa Tsubo to Tomo ni?" (Japanese: ああっ悪魔のささやきは壺と共にっ?)	Yoshiyuki Asai	Chabō Higurashi	June 16, 2005	
23	"Ah! The Savior, Together With the Sound of a Flute?"; Transliteration: "Aa! Kyūseishu wa Fue no Oto to Tomo Ni?" (Japanese: ああっ救世主は笛の音と共にっ?)	Hirotaka Endō	Yoh Watanabe	June 23, 2005	
24	"Ah! Always With You?"; Transliteration: "Aa! Itsumo Kimi to Tomo ni?" (Japanese: ああっいつもキミと共にっ?)	Hiroaki Gōda; Itsuki Imazaki; Teragijin Hitoaki	Yoh Watanabe	July 7, 2005	
25	"Ah! Urd's Small Love Story?"; Transliteration: "Aa? Urudo no Chiisana Koi Monogatari?" (Japanese: ああっウルドの小さな恋物語っ)	Ei Aoki	Aoshima Takashi	December 23, 2005 (OVA)	
26	"Ah! Being an Adult is Heart-Throbbing?"; Transliteration: "Aa! Doki Doki wa Otona no Aji?" (Japanese: ああっドキドキは大人の味っ?)	Takafumi Hoshikawa	Jukki Hanada	December 23, 2005 (OVA)	

== Volume DVDs ==
=== Japanese release ===
Bandai Visual released the episodes in Japan between April 22, 2005, and November 25, 2005, as eight DVD compilations each containing three episodes. The two original video animations (OVAs), which had not been broadcast, were released on a special DVD on December 23, 2005.

Bandai Visual (Japan, Region 2 DVD)
Volume	Episodes	Release date	Ref.
Volume 1	1–3	April 25, 2005	
Volume 2	4–6	May 27, 2005	
Volume 3	7–9	June 24, 2005	
Volume 4	10–12	July 22, 2005	
Volume 5	13–15	August 26, 2005	
Volume 6	16–18	September 23, 2005	
Volume 7	19–21	October 28, 2005	
Volume 8	23–24	November 25, 2005	
Volume 9	25-26	December 23, 2005	

=== North American release ===
In Region 1, the anime was licensed to Media Blasters, which released six DVD compilations, containing all twenty-six episodes, between September 27, 2005, and July 11, 2006. A premium complete season box set was released on November 7, 2006; the regular set followed on November 27, 2007.

Media Blasters (North America, Region 1 DVD)
Volume	Episodes	Release date	Ref.
Volume 1	1–5	September 27, 2005	
Volume 2	6-10	November 29, 2005	
Volume 3	11-14	January 31, 2006	
Volume 4	15-18	March 28, 2006	
Volume 5	19-22	May 30, 2006	
Volume 6	23-26	July 11, 2006	
Premium DVD Box	1-26	November 7, 2006	
Normal DVD Box	1-26	November 27, 2007	

=== United Kingdom release ===
MVM Entertainment distributed the series in the United Kingdom, with the individual volumes released between February 5, 2007, and December 3, 2007, in six similar DVD compilations. The box set followed on July 7, 2008.

MVM Entertainment (United Kingdom, Region 2 DVD)
Volume	Episodes	Release date	Ref.
Volume 1	1–5	February 5, 2007	
Volume 2	5-10	April 16, 2007	
Volume 3	11-14	June 18, 2007	
Volume 4	15-18	August 6, 2007	
Volume 5	19-22	October 1, 2007	
Volume 6	23-26	December 3, 2007	
DVD Box	1-26	July 7, 2008	

=== Australasia release ===
Madman Entertainment distributed the series in Australasia, with the six individual volumes released between July 26, 2006, and December 6, 2006. The DVD collection containing all 26 episodes was released on October 10, 2007.

Madman Entertainment (Australasia, Region 4 DVD)
Volume	Episodes	Release date	Ref.
Volume 1	1–5	July 26, 2006	
Volume 2	5-10	August, 2006	
Volume 3	11-14	September 6, 2006	
Volume 4	15-18	October, 2006	
Volume 5	19-22	November, 2006	
Volume 6	23-26	December 6, 2006	
DVD Box	1-26	October 10, 2007	

== Notes ==
A. Episode 12.5 was not included in the English DVD releases and it consequently has no official U.S. title. In addition, the episode is not officially numbered but had aired between episodes 12 and 13. The title translates loosely to "Ah! An Exchange Diary with the Goddess?"
