= Sean Griffin =

American author

Academic work
- Discipline: Film studies
- Institutions: Meadows School of the Arts
- Notable works: Tinker Belles and Evil Queens (2000)

Sean Griffin is a critical queer film theory scholar and professor at the Meadows School of the Arts. His work includes Tinker Belles and Evil Queens: The Walt Disney Company from the Inside Out, which was adapted from his dissertation.

== Tinker Belles and Evil Queens ==
Tinker Belles and Evil Queens (2000) suggests that The Walt Disney Company, despite having a focus on heterocentric "family values" in its films, has long attracted gay audiences, particularly through queercoding and gay subtext of its films. It was described by journalist Nico Lang of Harper's Bazaar as "the book on the gay history of Disney". According to Jonathan Alexander, Griffin argues that Disney did this out of economic considerations of LGBT consumers paying for Disney products.

== Select publications ==
- Griffin, Sean (2000). Tinker Belles and Evil Queens : The Walt Disney Company from the Inside Out. NYU Press. ISBN 9780814738702.
- Benshoff, Harry M.; Griffin, Sean (2004). America on film: representing race, class, gender, and sexuality at the movies. Wiley. ISBN 9780631225829.
- Benshoff, Harry M.; Griffin, Sean (2005). Queer Images: A History of Gay and Lesbian Film in America. Rowman & Littlefield Publishers. ISBN 9780742568570.
