= National Expert Commission of Ukraine on the Protection of Public Morality =

Defunct Ukrainian media screening body

The National Expert Commission of Ukraine on the Protection of Public Morality (Ukrainian: Національна експертна комісія України з питань захисту суспільної моралі, romanized: Natsionalna ekspertna komisiia Ukrainy z pytan zakhystu suspilnoi morali) was a state body that from late 2004 till early 2015 operated to evaluate media to check they observed Ukrainian morality laws, which ban inciting religious hatred, producing or disseminating pornography, and propagating alcoholism and smoking. The commission was disbanded by the Ukrainian parliament on 10 February 2015.

== History ==
On 17 November 2004 the commission was established by then Prime Minister Viktor Yanukovych.

In December 2010, then-President Yanukovych issued a decree to eliminate the commission.

In August 2012, the body gained media attention in the United States and the United Kingdom for reviewing allegations that popular children's properties, such as SpongeBob SquarePants, Disney films, Shrek, and Teletubbies are inappropriate for children and needed to be banned.

The commission was eliminated by the Ukrainian parliament on 10 February 2015.

The (law that created the) body was criticised by the Kharkiv Human Rights Protection Group for being dangerously open to subjective interpretation what precisely “harms public morality”. But it noted that the commission was never used to limit freedom of speech.

== See also ==
- State Committee in Television and Radio-broadcasting (Ukraine)
