= Dottie's Magic Pockets =

American children's television series

Dottie's Magic Pockets is an American children's puppet live-action musical television series featuring Dottie and her magical friends as they sing, dance, and learn created by Tammy Stoner. Dottie's Magic Pockets is the first LGBT children's programming created for gay families, single-parent families, adopted families and traditional families.

The Dottie's Magic Pockets DVD was released in September 2007. "Dottie", portrayed by actor Jen Plante, appeared on the R Family Vacations cruise to the Mexican Riviera in March 2008, marking the first time the LGBT families and friends would be "entertained by the main character of a kids' show that is set in a lesbian household".

Dottie's Magic Pockets' main characters include several puppets: James the Flower, Uncanny the Singing Can, Matilda the Mouse and Randal the Beaver. Other characters are represented using animations and claymations - many have two mothers or two fathers. The live-action format of Dottie's Magic Pockets is similar to other live-action shows, such as Yo Gabba Gabba, Sesame Street and Pee Wee's Playhouse.

The DVD was followed up by a 55-minute CD titled The Super, Secret Seashell Cave. The CD is a sing-along adventure featuring Dottie, James Uncanny, Motilda and Randal, with 16 original songs composed by Allyson Newman. It was released in December 2009.

The Dottie's Magic Pockets DVD and CD were produced by production company Pink Pea LLC.

The DVD appeared in Outfest 2008 and a dozen festivals around the world, including the 2009 London Lesbian and Gay Film Festival, the Inside Out Film and Video Festival and the Melbourne Queer Film Festival. In 2010 Plante also performed as Dottie at the Frameline Film Festival and the Austin Gay Lesbian Film Festival. Both the DVD and CD have been accepted into dozens of libraries in Canada and America.
