= List of cross-dressing characters in animated series =

This is a list of characters who cross-dress, whether LGBTQ+ or not, in animated series. This includes some characters listed on the list of animated series with LGBTQ characters page, drag queens, drag kings, tomboys, janegirls and others who cross-dress.

Cross-dressing generally runs counter to established gender norms and can be seen as a form of transgender behavior but it doesn't always indicate such an identity, even though popular media often "lump cross-dressing and homosexuality together." There is also the phenomenon of "situational cross-dressing" where heterosexual characters cross-dress as a plot device or "other non-gender-expressive reasons," especially superheroes and supervillains. Harry Benshoff and Sean Griffin write that animation has always "hint[ed] at the performative nature of gender" such as when Bugs Bunny puts on a wig and a dress, he is a rabbit in drag as a human male who is in drag as a female.

The names are organized alphabetically by surname (i.e. last name), or by single name if the character does not have a surname. If more than two characters are in one entry, the last name of the first character is used.

== List of characters ==
Characters	Show title	Character debut date	Notes	Country
Ayumu Aikawa	Is This a Zombie?	January 20, 2009	He becomes a "mahou shoujo" as a result of absorbing Haruna's magic, resulting in him wearing a pink frilly outfit and all, in order to fight Megalos.	Japan
Masaki Akemiya	Whispered Words	October 7, 2009	Masaki likes Sumika, but when he notices that she is lesbian and likes Ushio he cross-dresses in order to catch her attention. After his younger sister finds out, she sends pictures of him to a magazine and pictures of him start appearing in magazines under the alias Akemi Yamasaki. Ushio sees the pictures and develops a crush on Akemi and wants to meet 'her' as shown in the episode "4+1".	Japan
Aki	Magical Shopping Arcade Abenobashi	April 4, 2002	He is a transvestite who is the lifelong resident of the Abenobashi Shopping Arcade with an overly affectionate auntie-type attitude. In each parallel world, he often appears in various comedic female roles under the name Ms. Aki.	Japan
Hibiki Amawa	I My Me! Strawberry Eggs	July 4, 2001	Graduated from college in athletics, he disguises himself as a woman so that he can obtain a job as a gym teacher under the alias of Miss Hibiki Amawa at the all-female Seitō Sannomiya Private School. He, however, has a school board growing suspicious of him and is exposed by one of his students, Fūko, who develops her feelings for him.	Japan
Angel Dust	Hazbin Hotel	October 28, 2019	Angel Dust is a gay adult film actor. In the season 2 episode "Scream Rain", he performs at a casino as a drag queen while singing the song "Losin' Streak".	United States
Hime Arikawa	Himegoto	July 7, 2014	He is a cross-dressing boy, who is forced by members of the student council, like Aruku 18-kin, to wear frilly, girlish, outfits. In the same series, Hime's brother, Kaguya, Hiro Toyotomi, No. 1, and Mitsunaga Oda, all of whom oppose the Student Council, also cross-dress.	Japan
Kaguya Arikawa	Himegoto	July 7, 2014	He cross-dresses as a girl like his brother, Hime, and every other male character in the series, apart from Yuuma.	Japan
Makoto Ariga	Wandering Son	January 20, 2011	Makoto, known as Mako for short, was assigned male at birth like Shuichi, expressing a desire to be a straight trans woman primarily due to her love of men and cross-dressing like Shuichi. She even dreams of entering into a relationship with a cool adult man.	Japan
Bastien "Twink"	Q-Force	September 2, 2021	Twink is an effeminate gay French Canadian who is a drag queen taking on several disguises, known as the "Master of Drag" for a group of LGBT superspies called Q-Force.	United States
Yellow Belmont	Genesis Climber MOSPEADA	October 2, 1983	Also known as Lancer Belmont in Robotech, he is a soldier who takes on the disguise of a female singer named Yellow Dancer. In the OVA, Sorji is living with Yellow in a cabin in the woods.	Japan
Bobobo-bo Bo-bobo	Bobobo-bo Bo-bobo	November 8, 2003	An eccentric man with bodybuilder-sized muscles and a giant yellow afro who fights the forces of evil using his nose hair, he cross-dresses throughout the series.	Japan
Bugs Bunny	Looney Tunes	1939	Bugs appeared in ladies garb or cross-dressed in at least 45 cartoons. Whilst other Looney Tunes characters such as Bugs' rival Daffy Duck also cross-dressed on occasion, Bugs is particularly notable for the regularity of his cross-dressing and the totality of his performance, notably passing within the confines of the story with much more ease than other characters.	United States
Clayface	Harley Quinn	April 10, 2020	In the Season 2 episode "Riddle U", Clayface disguises himself as a female student under the name Stephanie in Riddler University where he meets his pseudo-boyfriend Chad.	United States
Cybersix	Cybersix	September 6, 1999	Throughout this series, during the day Cybersix dresses up as a male literature teacher under the alias "Adrian Seidelman" who teaches at the Meridiana High School in the fictional city of Meridiana. (Note: In the comic, Cybersix says "I am no longer Adrian Seidelman. I remove the male clothing that camouflage me all day. I verify that I am always a woman" and also says "It makes me feel a bit more human. I'm continuing the tradition of Fernando Pessoa, the Portuguese poet who lived as four different people at once.") At night, she switches back into her usual attire: a leather outfit, cape, and hat, fighting villains. She is aided by her brother, Data 7, and Lucas Amato, her colleague, friend, and love interest. Cybersix only reveals her dual identity to Lori Anderson, a student who is infatuated with Adrian.	Canada
D'eon de Beaumont/Lia de Beaumont	Le Chevalier D'Eon	August 19, 2006	Lia de Beaumont is killed and her brother D'eon de Beaumont seeks her murderers. Ultimately, her spirit begins to inhabit his body whenever his life is in danger. This character is based on the identity that real-life cross-dresser, Chevalier d'Eon claimed in a 1756 mission to Russia.	Japan
Kaoru Daichi	Ladies versus Butlers!	February 9, 2010	Kaoru is a servant-ed student whose strict father raised her as a boy. She pretends to be a male student at Hakureiryō Academy, a boarding school where she is easily mistaken for a boy and has many fans in the upper-ed section, although she is worried that her true gender would be exposed especially when she is with her roommate Akiharu whom she unconsciously develops feelings for.	Japan
Donizete (Scarlet Carmesim)	Super Drags	November 9, 2018	The series follows the adventures of Donizete, Patrick, and Ralph, three gay friends working in a department store, who are also drag queen superheroes known as the Super Drags, named Scarlet Carmesim, Lemon Chifon, and Safira Cyan, and are responsible for protecting the LGBTQ community.	Brazil
Patrick (Lemon Chifon)	Super Drags	November 9, 2018	The series follows the adventures of Donizete, Patrick, and Ralph, three gay friends working in a department store, who are also drag queen superheroes known as the Super Drags, named Scarlet Carmesim, Lemon Chifon, and Safira Cyan, and are responsible for protecting the LGBTQ community.	Brazil
Ralph (Safira Cyan)	Super Drags	November 9, 2018	The series follows the adventures of Donizete, Patrick, and Ralph, three gay friends working in a department store, who are also drag queen superheroes known as the Super Drags, named Scarlet Carmesim, Lemon Chifon, and Safira Cyan, and are responsible for protecting the LGBTQ community.	Brazil
Fish Eye	Sailor Moon	March 4, 1995	The villain Fish Eye is an effeminate cross-dressing man who is romantically interested in other men as first shown in the episode "Meeting of Destiny: The Night Pegasus Dances". He was changed into a woman in the English dub.	Japan
Oscar François de Jarjayes	The Rose of Versailles	October 10, 1979	Oscar is a young woman raised as a soldier, dressing and behaving as a man, whose former love interest is one of the series protagonists, Princess Marie Antoinette. She also has a relationship with André, a childhood friend, who is only able to share one passionate night with Oscar.	Japan
Haruhi Fujioka	Ouran High School Host Club	April 4, 2006	She cross-dresses as a boy so she can work in a host club to pay off a debt she owes to the other members. This cross-dressing is later exploited by the Host Club, which struggles to keep her true gender secret as noted in episodes such as "The Job of a High School Host!" and "A Challenge from Lobelia Girls' Academy!"	Japan
Ryōuji "Ranka" Fujioka	Ouran High School Host Club	June 6, 2006	Haruhi's father Ryouji is bisexual and works in a gay bar as a drag queen under the name Ranka, as shown in the episode "A Day in the Life of the Fujioka Family!" for example. Ryoji still deeply loves his deceased wife, Kotoko, and declares that he works as a cross-dresser because he will never truly love another.	Japan
Nagihiko Fujisaki/Nadeshiko Fujisaki	Shugo Chara!	October 13, 2007	Nagihiko is a long-haired boy who cross-dresses as his "twin sister" named Nadeshiko out of family tradition. He is a friend to Amu, whom he looks over and supports in her love life, though he has trouble telling her that he is really a boy. Nagihiko also cross-dresses in his transformation Yamato Maihime.	Japan
Yui Goidō	The World God Only Knows: Goddesses	July 15, 2013	Yui, the daughter of the richest family in Majima City, starts her own freedom of playing off of Keima Katsuragi after accidentally switching their bodies. When they return to their old bodies, Yui decides to cross-dress as she becomes a more independent tomboy from her family.	Japan
Emilia Gudenburg/Emile Crossfode	Hundred	April 5, 2016	She is the third princess from the Gudenburg Empire who initially poses as a boy under the alias of Emile Crossfode, with only a few people aware of her secret until she later reveals her true identity. Emilia is a roommate and love interest of Hayato Kisaragi.	Japan
Guy Hamdon (SheZow)	SheZow	December 15, 2012	An irresponsible preteen boy accidentally gains a magical ring of power that belonged to his late Aunt Agnes but is intended only for a girl, suddenly causing him to cross-dress and forcing him to save the world as a female superheroine called "SheZow".	Australia
Kokoro Hanabusa	I-Chu: Halfway Through the Idol	January 20, 2021	Kokoro, Momo and Runa are a trio of otokonoko idols, together known as POP'N Star, who present themselves female.	Japan
Momosuke "Momo" Oikawa	I-Chu: Halfway Through the Idol	January 20, 2021	Kokoro, Momo and Runa are a trio of otokonoko idols, together known as POP'N Star, who present themselves female.	Japan
Tsuki "Runa" Kagurasaka	I-Chu: Halfway Through the Idol	January 20, 2021	Kokoro, Momo and Runa are a trio of otokonoko idols, together known as POP'N Star, who present themselves female.	Japan
Makoto Hanaoka	Senpai Is an Otokonoko	December 7, 2019	A young man who dresses like a woman despite his mother's disapproval and is in a love triangle with a woman named Saki Aoi and a man named Ryuji Taiga.ref name="ddnavi rev">Tachibana, Momo (2021-08-23). 「どっちかじゃないとダメなんですか？」 女の子だと思って告白した先輩は男の子だった！女装男子をめぐる群像劇. Da Vinci (in Japanese). Kadokawa Corporation. Archived from the original on 2021-07-26.</ref> The manga was later adapted into an anime, with the same themes.	Japan
Tatsukichi Hayama	MM!	October 2, 2010	Tatsukichi enjoys cross-dressing (which induces his female alter-ego, "Tatsumi Antoinette XVI"). While cross-dressing, his alter-ego has a superiority complex.	Japan
Hayashi	Hakata Tonkotsu Ramens	January 12, 2018	Like Ling, Hayashi is a cross-dresser.	Japan
Sir Integra Hellsing	Hellsing	October 10, 2001	She is the noble head of the Hellsing Organization who appears to be masculine and is referred to as "sir" despite being a woman, as well as the master of vampire Alucard.	Japan
Aoi Hyōdō	Maid Sama!	April 22, 2010	Aoi is the androgynous owner of Maid Latte café who enjoys cross-dressing due to his liking towards some "cute, girly things". He is known in his female persona as a cute Internet idol and also enjoys toying with the feelings of men, especially to Takumi Usui.	Japan
Nagi Ichinose	Nyan Koi!	October 22, 2009	Nagi is the heir of a powerful yakuza family from Kyoto who, despite being a girl, starts assuming a more masculine personality, looking and behaving like a boy. She has a rare condition where she gets drunk from drinking soft drinks, which seems to give her homosexual-like, affectionate feelings towards other girls, including Kaede who calls her "Ichinose-senpai". However, Nagi starts falling in love with Junpei, who has a crush on Kaede, and resorts to extreme actions after being comforted by him.	Japan
Jakotsu	InuYasha	February 24, 2003	Member of the Band of Seven, he is a homosexual mercenary who wears women's kimono and makeup in repeated attempts to flirt with both Inuyasha and Miroku, as first seen in the Season 4 episode "The Band of Seven, Resurrected!" (Note: Jakotsu was originally going to be a woman, but the series' creator felt uncomfortable to depict Inuyasha fighting a human female, choosing instead to make Jakotsu a gay man in drag.)	Japan
James	Pokémon	April 8, 1997	He has a tendency to cross-dress, impersonating Nurse Joy, Officer Jenny, and Jessie, along with famous celebrities.	Japan
Julius	Cowboy Bebop	January 9, 1999	Julius is a feisty and flirtatious drag queen whom Spike Spiegel runs into while searching for Julia in the episode "Jupiter Jazz (Part 1)". He is the one who responded that he sees every women named "Julia" every day, and he suggests Spike to find Grencia, the sax player at the Blue Crow city who sometimes seems to be with women.	Japan
Yuuki Kagami	See Me After Class	June 23, 2012	In order to avoid being expelled, a teacher, Ayana Kakinozaka, has Yuuki cross-dress and becomes his guardian.	Japan
Honjō Kamatari	Rurouni Kenshin	June 18, 1997	A cross-dressing member of the Juppongatana, he is gay and in love with Shishio Makoto as shown in the episode "To Make a Miracle: The Battle at the Aoiya." He tends to dress as a woman but knows he will never be as loved like the female Yumi or Shishio's right-hand man since Sojiro is far more skilled.	Japan
Yuu Kashima	Monthly Girls' Nozaki-kun	July 20, 2014	Kashima, otherwise known as the "Prince of the School", is a tall and androgynous student of class 2-G whose prince-like personality makes the other schoolgirls fawn over her and who acts as every masculine lead role in school's Drama Club, although she is openly fond of Masayuki Hori, president of the Drama Club, and wants him to consider her favorite "cute kōhai". She is the best friend and classmate of Mikoto Mikoshiba.	Japan
Kei	Dirty Pair	July 15, 1985	A hot-headed, aggressive woman who is the first to open fire, often with a short temper. She is a tomboy who is attracted to manly, muscular men, while her teammate Yuri is more feminine, preferring cultured, refined men.	Japan
Akira Kenjou (Cure Chocolat)	Kirakira ☆PreCure à la Mode	March 5, 2017	One of the six magical Cure girls, Akira has a boyish appearance that is unknown to others why. She is a gentle, and lesbian, high school student who has a strong sense of justice like a dog and flirts towards Yukari Kotozume/Cure Macaron. In the episode "The Targeted School Festival! Chocolat in Wonderland!", Akira wears a costume as the "Prince of Hearts" for the Alice in Wonderland-themed school festival.	Japan
Ash Ketchum	Pokémon	April 1, 1997	In one episode, Ash cross-dresses in order to disguise himself to get into the Celadon Gym since he had been banned from there in the past for causing a fuss as shown in the episode "Pokémon Scent-sation!." He also cross-dresses in other episodes as "Juliet" in the episode "Love at First Flight," in a maid outfit in the episode "Tanks for the Memories" as "Ashley" at a theater in the episode "Beauties Battling for Pride and Prestige!" and as a female nurse in the episode "Real Life...Inquire Within."	Japan
Kino	Kino's Journey	April 8, 2003	Kino was assigned female at birth, but has a "androgynous persona," alternating between using feminine and masculine pronouns, while resisting those that attempt to pin a gender on her as a "girl" or "boy." Kino has also been described as a cross-dresser.	Japan
Sakura Kinomoto	Cardcaptor Sakura	April 7, 1998	In the Season 2 episode "Sakura and the Blacked Out School Arts Festival", Sakura takes on the role of the Prince, while her love interest Syaoran Li embarrassedly has the role of the Princess, to put on a play of Sleeping Beauty for the Festival of Arts at Tomoeda Elementary School.	Japan
Yūsuke Kinoshita	The Ping Pong Club	April 5, 1995	Although he is usually the quintessential "pretty boy" in the ping-pong club, in one episode Maeno and Izawa dress him like a girl and it's now Tanaka who's chasing after him.	Japan
Kitsunezuka Ko'on-no-Kami/Seymour "The Big" Cheese	Kyatto Ninden Teyandee/Samurai Pizza Cats	February 1, 1990	Seymour "The Big" Cheese is the advisor to Emperor Fred who wants to overthrow Little Tokyo. He is a flamboyant fox who crossdresses. The Big Cheese took on a female persona called Mrs. Ratina in the episode "Samurai Charm School". In the Japanese version of "Samurai Savings Time", it is explained the reason why The Big Cheese cross-dresses is that he saw his future self crossdressed. In contrast with most 1990s English language dubs at the time, The Big Cheese's gender was kept. The only change was his species as he was changed to a rat.	Japan
Kuranosuke Koibuchi	Princess Jellyfish	October 15, 2010	He is the son of a rich political family and loves to cross-dress in women's clothing and makeup, appearing in various fashionable outfits throughout the series, as well as several different wigs. (Note: The creator of Princess Jellyfish comics describes him as "the cross-dressing guy," saying that initially he was just "going to be just a pretty girl" that he was dreaming of becoming, saying that "I’ve imagined Kuranosuke to have a very strong personality. But by making him into a cross-dressing guy, it made him even more of a strong character, who is very self-assured.") He uses the alias "Kurako" in front of the other Amars to hide his gender.	Japan
Subaru Konoe	Mayo Chiki!	July 7, 2011	Female protagonist of the story and a second-year high school student who works as a butler for the Suzutsuki family. She has to cross-dress because Kanade's father has allowed Subaru to be his daughter's butler only if she can spend the entire three years at school with her true gender undiscovered. Her physical features allow her to fool everyone into believing her to be a boy until Kinjirō accidentally discovers her secret in the show's first episode as shown in the episode "End of Earth". Her cross-dressing is a major theme for the rest of the show.	Japan
Toru Kouno	Princess Princess	April 5, 2006	The three boys were selected to be the "princesses" at the all-boy school they attend as first shown in the episode "The All Boys School's Princesses". They cross-dress as girls, which is a tradition with the purpose of breaking up the monotony of life surrounded by nothing but males. They are expected to encourage others at school, and cheer at school events as shown in episodes like "Yuujirou's Past".	Japan
Yuujirou Shihoudani	Princess Princess	April 5, 2006	The three boys were selected to be the "princesses" at the all-boy school they attend as first shown in the episode "The All Boys School's Princesses". They cross-dress as girls, which is a tradition with the purpose of breaking up the monotony of life surrounded by nothing but males. They are expected to encourage others at school, and cheer at school events as shown in episodes like "Yuujirou's Past".	Japan
Mikoto Yutaka	Princess Princess	April 5, 2006	The three boys were selected to be the "princesses" at the all-boy school they attend as first shown in the episode "The All Boys School's Princesses". They cross-dress as girls, which is a tradition with the purpose of breaking up the monotony of life surrounded by nothing but males. They are expected to encourage others at school, and cheer at school events as shown in episodes like "Yuujirou's Past".	Japan
Seiya Kou (Sailor Star Fighter)	Sailor Moon	May 11, 1996	Together known as the Sailor Starlights, they are a group of three genderqueer Sailor Guardians who land on Earth, disguising themselves as a group of male pop stars called "The Three Lights" in search for their princess, Kakyuu, whose planet Kinmoku was destroyed by villainess Sailor Galaxia. Seiya Kou, leader of the Starlights and the lead vocalist of The Three Lights, develops his/her romantic feelings for Usagi Tsukino, though she is actually already engaged to Mamoru Chiba, whom he/she calls odango and attempts to forge a bond with.	Japan
Taiki Kou (Sailor Star Maker)	Sailor Moon	May 11, 1996		Japan
Yaten Kou (Sailor Star Healer)	Sailor Moon	May 11, 1996		Japan
Makoto (Mako-chan)	Minami-ke	November 11, 2007	Makoto is an elementary school student and classmate of Chiaki Minami, who is forced by Kana Minami to dress as a girl under the name Mako-chan so that he can get closer to Haruka Minami whom he loves the most and avoid detection from Chiaki. Makoto also shares a friendship with Tōmo due to their similar gender problems.	Japan
Randy Marsh	South Park	August 27, 1997	Stan and Shelly Marsh's father, Randy, produces music and performs as a female singer called Lorde, as first shown in the Season 18 episode "Gluten Free Ebola". And in the Season 13 episode "Pinewood Derby", he disguises himself as Princess Leia to sneak into the Large Hadron Collider at CERN. Randy also cross-dresses in the collectable card mobile game South Park: Phone Destroyer, such as in the roles of Pocahontas and Poison Ivy.	United States
Parade MC	Blue's Clues & You!	May 28, 2021	The Parade MC is an animated version of Nina West; a drag queen who hosts a pride parade and performs a tune of "When Johnny Comes Marching Home", entitled "Families Go Marching", alongside the LGBTQ animal families in the sing-along video.	United States
Makoto Mizuhara	El-Hazard	October 6, 1995	Makoto has an uncanny resemblance to Princess Fatora Venus. (Note: As Katsuhiko Jinnai puts it in the final episode of the OVA after looking at Fatora: "That explains why that cowardly rodent Makoto was dressing like a drag queen! What a scamp! Just looking at that familiar face makes me go crazy!") So as to not ruin alliances, he cross-dresses as her for six of the seven episodes of "The Magnificent World" OVA. Some characters like Shayla-Shayla call him a pervert for doing so, as noted in the episode "The World of Hot Springs," while Alielle tries to have sex with him thinking he is Fatora as noted in the episode "The World of Beautiful Girls." After his true identity is revealed to the royal court in the sixth episode, "The World of Gleaming Light," he wears his usual school clothes (a formal suit and tie) for the rest of the original OVA, "The Magnificent World." In the next OVA, "The Magnificent World 2," he puts on woman's hair and pretends he is a sister of Fatora, which Fatora uses to her advantage so she can kiss Shayla-Shayla in the episode "The Bride of Roshtari."	Japan
Shima Nishina	Kiss Him, Not Me	October 27, 2016	She is a lesbian underclasswoman who is a fujoshi, like her lover Kae Serinuma, and cosplays as a male butler for whom Kae initially mistaken her for a man due to her androgynous appearance.	Japan
Shuichi Nitori	Wandering Son	January 13, 2011	Shuichi Nitori, otherwise known by Shu (シュウ, Shū) and Nitorin (にとりん), is a lesbian transgender woman and often dresses to assume the role of the female gender, and is often described as cute, able to appear as a girl while cross-dressing, which is encouraged by their friends Yoshino Takatsuki and Saori Chiba. Later on, they exhibit signs of gender dysphoria and displays an outward attraction to two characters in the series—Yoshino, a transgender man, and their female classmate, Anna Suehiro. The latter date for a shirt time, until the relationship is broken off, and later resumed.	Japan
Nuriko	Fushigi Yûgi	April 2, 1995	Nuriko initially dresses and acts as a woman named Kang-lin, one of Hotohori's concubines because Kang-lin was his twin sister who died and he wanted to keep her memory alive as shown in the episode, "The Seven Stars of Suzaku". He enjoys cross-dressing, as indicates in the episode "Even If I Die...", and is in love with Hotohori, but later also grows to love the main heroine Miaka as indicated in the episode "Brief Parting".	Japan
Hikozaemon Ootaki	Ah! My Goddess	January 6, 2005	He dresses in punk-style and is an ex-directors of the Nekomi Motor Club. He cross-dresses just like Tamiya.	Japan
Peppo	Gankutsuou: The Count of Monte Cristo	October 12, 2004	Peppo is a gay boy who enjoys cross-dressing as a girl, leading some reviewers to mistake him as transgender. He develops feelings for Albert.	Japan
Renren	First Love Monster	July 2, 2016	An androgynous boy, cross-dressing idol, and the object of fanaticism by Arashi, much to Chiaki's chagrin.	Japan
Bender Bending Rodriguez	Futurama	March 28, 1999	Bender, the high-tech male robot, has the affections to several of his ex-girlfriends throughout the episodes. However, in the episode "Bend Her", Bender cross-dresses as a female robot under the name Coilette to participate in the fembot league of the Earth 3004 Olympic Games where he claims five gold medals in the competition. He then develops romantic feelings for another male robot called Calculon, whom he later becomes engaged to. Eventually at the wedding, Bender does not attempt to hurt Calculon with a divorce, instead faking his own death as he then changes back to his old self. In another episode "Proposition Infinity", he falls in love with a human named Amy, but after the proposition is approved, he dumps her after he realizes that he has to be monogamous and goes with a bunch of "robot floozies" instead.	United States
Roger	American Dad!	February 6, 2005	Roger is the very zany pansexual alien who lives in the Smith family's attic. Roger is shown to assume different aliases and a carousel of seemingly-endless lives, often outrageously deceiving numerous people. This includes a sweatshop owner, a bastard son of a prostitute and whore, wedding planner Jeannie Gold, news anchor Genevieve Vavance, and Meredith Fields (assuming the life of a socialite of the same name), along with hundreds of other personalities he embodies.	United States
Gintoki Sakata	Gin Tama	April 4, 2006	He is a frequent cross-dresser, even having an alter-ego once he has cross-dressed as a girl: "Paako." The latter first appeared in the 24th episode of the series.	Japan
Princess Sapphire	Princess Knight	April 2, 1967	Princess Sapphire is a girl who is raised as a boy by her father the King, since women are not eligible to inherit the throne. In addition, she is born with both a male and female heart but refuses to give up her boy heart as she needs it to vanquish evil. Nonetheless, Sapphire falls in love with and marries Prince Frank.	Japan
Sarasa	Basara	April 2, 1998	The story's protagonist, she balances her aggressive and masculine features with "requisite compassion towards the weak" while cross-dressing. Since she takes the name of her murdered twin brother Tatara, even among her allies few people know she is a girl.	Japan
Jyoji Seki	Doki Doki School Hours	April 4, 2004	A narcissist and bishounen, he is flamboyant and often cross-dresses. Often going to school in makeup, outside school, he has been seen in skirts and even a full ladies' kimono.	Japan
Izumi Sena	Love Stage!!	July 9, 2014	Izumi, a bisexual boy, dresses up as a girl in episodes such as "Because I Was Able to Meet You", and when Ryoma, the man he loves, finds out that he is actually a guy in drag, he is angered.	Japan
Mariya Shidō	Maria Holic	January 4, 2009	Mariya is a cross-dressing boy who attends Ame no Kisaki, a Catholic-based all-girl academy, as a girl as a means to win the chairmanship of both the all-male and all-female schools as shown in the episode "A Flirtatious Kiss." When Kanako first meets Mariya, she is instantly attracted to his playful femininity and kindness. He often teases Kanako by playing with his long blonde hair, speaking in a soft voice, and smiling sweetly, but Mariya turns out to be quite sadistic in nature.	Japan
Shuichi Shindo	Gravitation	October 4, 2000	Shuichi is a pink-haired gay high school singer who wears his sister Maiko's school uniform and dons a maid outfit in attempt to capture the romantic attention of Eiri Yuki, who was formerly engaged to Ayaka Usami.	Japan
Yūjirō Shiratori	The High School Life of a Fudanshi	August 17, 2016	Yūjirō is a gay effeminate cross-dresser with a liking toward men, as indicated in episodes such as "Everyone's Fun Times", with strong "female power".	Japan
Ayame Sohma	Fruits Basket	October 4, 2001	Yuki and his flamboyant older brother Ayame, the Rat and Snake of the Chinese zodiac, occasionally cross-dress because they look good in women's clothing. Their androgynous cousin Ritsu, the Monkey of the Chinese zodiac, feels comfortable and more confident only by cross-dressing regularly in kimono and is initially mistaken for a woman by Tohru because of his feminine face and long hair.	Japan
Ritsu Sohma	Fruits Basket	December 6, 2001	Yuki and his flamboyant older brother Ayame, the Rat and Snake of the Chinese zodiac, occasionally cross-dress because they look good in women's clothing. Their androgynous cousin Ritsu, the Monkey of the Chinese zodiac, feels comfortable and more confident only by cross-dressing regularly in kimono and is initially mistaken for a woman by Tohru because of his feminine face and long hair.	Japan
Yuki Sohma	Fruits Basket	July 5, 2001	Yuki and his flamboyant older brother Ayame, the Rat and Snake of the Chinese zodiac, occasionally cross-dress because they look good in women's clothing. Their androgynous cousin Ritsu, the Monkey of the Chinese zodiac, feels comfortable and more confident only by cross-dressing regularly in kimono and is initially mistaken for a woman by Tohru because of his feminine face and long hair.	Japan
Hitoshi Sugoroku	Nanbaka	October 5, 2016	Hitoshi is an effeminate otokonoko who looks, dresses and behaves like a woman. He is the younger brother of supervisor Hajime Sugoroku, as first shown in the episode "Idiots with Numbers!"	Japan
Leslie Robin Swisher (Veronica)	The Simpsons	February 20, 2005	Leslie Swisher is a pro golfer who disguises himself as a woman under the name Veronica to participate in the LPGA golf tournament, seen in the episode "There's Something About Marrying". He even cross-dresses as a bride when he is about to marry Patty Bouvier, who wears a white tuxedo as a groom. Patty, however, refuses to marry Leslie after discovering that he is really a man, because she is lesbian.	United States
Toraichi Tamiya	Ah! My Goddess	January 6, 2005	Tamiya, as does Ootaki, both cross-dress. Tamita is an ex-director of the Nekomi Motor Club and is a dark-skinned, hulking man.	Japan
Ryuzo Tanami	St. Luminous Mission High School	October 5, 1998	A boy who dresses up as a girl in order to attend a private girls' school with his friend, Kaihei Kijima.	Japan
Utena Tenjou	Revolutionary Girl Utena	April 2, 1997	Utena is a bisexual teenage tomboy who expresses her desire to be a "prince" as she cross-dresses to be a male student, but with her shorts on, at Ohtori Academy where she has been drawn into a series of swordsmen's duels to win the hand of her close friend, Anthy Himemiya, a mysterious girl who is known as the "Rose Bride" but is later revealed to be connected to "End of the World", while Utena is also in love with Anthy's brother, Akio Ohtori, as shown in episodes like "The Barefoot Girl", even though Akio has been sexually assaulting Anthy. Utena also cross-dresses to appear as a boy, with the relationship between her and Anthy becoming more sexually-tinged in the film adaptation Adolescence of Utena.	Japan
Haruka Tenou (Sailor Uranus)	Sailor Moon	April 16, 1994	Haruka is one of the Outer Sailor Guardians who is a swordsman and acts like a charming boy, though she is really a cross-dressing girl, to get the romantic attention of Michiru Kaiou, with their relationship kept in the English re-release of Sailor Moon.	Japan
Ringo Tsukimiya	Uta no Prince-sama: Maji Love 1000%	July 3, 2011	He is the clarinet playing teacher of Class A in the Saotome Academy who likes to cross-dress as a pink-haired woman because of his agency. His biggest dream is to perform as a male idol.	Japan
Ling Xianming	Hakata Tonkotsu Ramens	January 12, 2018	Ling is a man from Tokyo who has a short temper, enjoys cross-dressing, and is an assassin.	Japan
Hamaji Yakumo	H2O: Footprints in the Sand	January 25, 2008	Hamaji is a bisexual optimistic boy who cross-dresses as a very cute girl. He has occasionally flirted with Takuma but ultimately marries his best friend Maki.	Japan
Kazuki Yasaka	Sarazanmai	April 11, 2019	Kazuki, the middle school student, poses as female idol Sara Azuma to take selfies for his younger brother Haruka Yasaka, although the real Sara is actually a kappa who is the love interest to Prince Keppi. Kazuki's gay classmate Enta Jinnai has a secret crush on him.	Japan
Yukikaze	Demon Lord, Retry!	July 25, 2019	A B-rank adventurer who is accompanied with fellow adventurer Mikan. He is often been described as a "girlish boy" because of his feminine appearance, cross-dressing as a girl in episodes such as "Yu Kirino". He is deeply infatuated with the Demon Lord Kunai after being saved twice by him.	Japan
Jinshi	The Apothecary Diaries		Maomao assists Jinshi to cross-dress as the Moon Fairy willing to perform the dance in front of the twin sisters.	?

== See also ==
- History of cross-dressing
- Cross-dressing in literature
- Cross-dressing in film and television
- List of yaoi anime and manga
- List of yuri works
- List of LGBT-related films by year
- List of animated films with LGBT characters
- List of tomboys in fiction
- LGBTQ themes in Western animation
- LGBTQ themes in anime and manga
