= Harry Benshoff =

American academic

Harry M. Benshoff

Academic work
- Discipline: Film studies
- Institutions: University of North Texas
- Notable works: Monsters in the Closet

Harry M. Benshoff is an American professor, scholar, and published author who is the department chair of Media Arts at the University of North Texas (UNT).

He is the author of Monsters in the Closet, which deals with the portrayal of gay men in American horror and science fiction films, with the creation of what Benshoff calls the "monster queer" identity, which Benshoff posits as a counter-hegemonic identity to the heterosexual status quo. In this work, he argues that the films of Val Lewton in the 1940s, such as Cat People, reflected "a growing awareness of homosexuality, homosexual communities, and the dynamics of homosexual oppression as it was played out in society and the military" during that era, which led to a more nuanced depiction of monsters in films of that era. In 2022, he was interviewed for Queer for Fear, a 2022 documentary on LGBTQ representation in horror films.

He has also written books about the blaxploitation and the presentation of race in American horror films.

== Select publications ==
- Benshoff, Harry M. (November 15, 1997). Monsters in the Closet: Homosexuality and the Horror Film. Manchester University Press. ISBN 978-0-7190-4473-1.
- Benshoff, Harry M. (Winter 2000). "Blaxploitation Horror Films: Generic Reappropriation or Reinscription?". Cinema Journal. 39 (2): 31–50. doi:10.1353/cj.2000.0001. JSTOR 1225551. S2CID 144087335.
- Benshoff, Harry M.; Griffin, Sean (2004). America on film: representing race, class, gender, and sexuality at the movies. Wiley. ISBN 9780631225829.
- Benshoff, Harry M.; Griffin, Sean (2005). Queer Images: A History of Gay and Lesbian Film in America. Rowman & Littlefield Publishers. ISBN 9780742568570.
- Benshoff, Harry M. (2011). Dark Shadows. Wayne State University Press. ISBN 978-0-8143-3439-3.
- Benshoff, Harry M.; Griffin, Sean (August 26, 2011). America on Film: Representing Race, Class, Gender, and Sexuality at the Movies. John Wiley & Sons. ISBN 978-1-4443-5759-2.
