= Media portrayal of LGBTQ people =

Historically, the portrayal of lesbian, gay, bisexual, transgender and queer (LGBTQ+) people in media has been largely negative or absent, reflecting a general cultural intolerance of LGBTQ+ individuals; however, from the 1990s to present day, there has been an increase in the positive depictions of LGBTQ+ people, issues, and concerns within mainstream media in North America. The LGBTQ+ communities have taken an increasingly proactive stance in defining their own culture, with a primary goal of achieving an affirmative visibility in mainstream media. The positive portrayal or increased presence of the LGBTQ+ communities in media has served to increase acceptance and support for LGBTQ+ communities, establish LGBTQ+ communities as a norm, and provide information on the topic.

Research has used quantitative results to show the "positive direct effects of LGBTQ+ television exposure on resilience and identity affirmation."

Gwendolyn Audrey Foster said in Performing Whiteness: Postmodern Re/Constructions in the Cinema (2003), "We may still live in a world of white dominance and heterocentrism, but I think we can agree that we are in the midst of postmodern destabilizing forces when it comes to sexuality and race." In her book Imitation and Gender Insubordination (1991), Judith Butler argues that the idea of heteronormativity is reinforced through socio-cultural conditioning, but even more so through visual culture which promotes homo-invisibility.

== Overview ==
Although LGBTQ+ individuals are generally indistinguishable from their straight or cisgender counterparts, media depictions of LGBTQ+ individuals often represent them as visibly and behaviorally different. For example, in many forms of popular entertainment, gay men are portrayed stereotypically as promiscuous, flashy, flamboyant, and bold, while the reverse is often true of how lesbians are portrayed. Media representations of bisexual and transgender people tend to either completely erase them, or depict them as either morally corrupt or mentally unstable. Similar to race-, religion-, and class-based caricatures, these stereotypical stock character representations vilify or make light of marginalized and misunderstood groups.

Gay and lesbian families are commonly misrepresented in media because society frequently equates sexual orientation with the ability to reproduce. Gay and lesbian characters are rarely the main character in films; they frequently play the role of stereotyped supporting characters or are portrayed as a victim or villain.

There is currently a widespread view that references to gay people should be omitted from child-related entertainment. Such references almost invariably generate controversy. In 1997, when American comedian Ellen DeGeneres came out on her popular sitcom, many sponsors including Wendy's fast-food chain, pulled their advertising.

However, milestones to the lesbian and gay communities such as the book Vice Versa and DeGeneres coming out have encouraged other LGBTQ+ people to come out and feel better about being themselves.

Despite the stereotypical depictions of gay people, the media has at times promoted acceptance with television shows such as Will and Grace and Queer Eye. The increased publicity reflects the coming-out movement of LGBTQ+ communities. As more celebrities come out, more LGBTQ+-friendly shows develop, such as the 2004 show The L Word. With the popularity of gay television shows, music artists and gay fashion, Western culture has opened its eyes to the gay community.

This new acceptance from the media can partially be explained by the contact hypothesis. With more shows promoting the acceptance of gay people, audiences are able to view a more correct depiction of LGBTQ+ communities.

Media that more accurately displays queer identity outside of stereotypes, though, can also elicit homophobic backlash. Social identity theory posits that people's self-concept (and self-esteem by extension) is created in part by their membership within social groups, and by those that occupy the same membership. When characters who identify as gay men defy stereotypes, in embodying masculine traits, for example, the ingroup/outgroup distinction for heterosexual men can become blurred. In efforts to protect in-group characteristics (masculinity, for example) as distinct from the man and gay identities, heterosexual men can be more likely to discriminate against their gay counterparts

In the United States, gay people are frequently used as a symbol of social decadence by celebrity evangelists and by organizations such as Focus on the Family.

LGBTQ+ people in the media are often highly misrepresented, usually categorizing all of them into just lesbian and gay identities. Then, people have created stereotypes for lesbian and gay characters. This action contradicts the whole purpose of the fictional characters of LGBTQ+ people. It may allow some people to understand that LGBTQ+ people are more common than they realize; however, it still reinforces stereotypes and negative stigmas.

== History ==
=== United States ===
==== Early twentieth century ====
The first representation of same-sex interactions was a portrayal of two men dancing with each other to violin music in 1895, with Edison Short's ca. 17-second long early experimental sound film The Gay Brothers, though both that title for the film and whether it actually was meant to have any homoerotic undertones is disputed. Through the early twentieth century, portrayals of homosexuality in media was uncommon, and when represented it was often used as a comic device; for example Sissy Man in Stan Laurel's silent film The Soilers in 1923.

The 1930s brought a new increased presence of LGBTQ+ people in media. In 1934, the strengthening of the Production Code was created in attempt to reduce the portrayals of homosexuality in media; however, this made little headway in the movement. Throughout the 1930s–1960s, an increase in the presence of Christian-based morality was seen, and portrayals (positive or negative) were highly censored or removed. Many negative sub-contexts remained regarding homosexuality, such as in Alfred Hitchcock's films, whose villains used an implication of homosexuality to heighten their evilness and alienation.

In news media, homosexuality was rarely explicitly mentioned, and it was often portrayed as a sickness, perversion or crime. In the 1950s community magazines such as The Mattachine Society, One, and The Ladder connected lesbian and gay communities around the United States by providing readers information and access to LGBTQ+ perspectives that could not be found anywhere else. Transgender communities used magazines such as Sexology and Transvestia, as an essential source of understanding identity and broadening their communities.

==== Stonewall riots (1960s)–1980s ====
In 1969, a series of spontaneous uprisings in New York called the Stonewall riots took place as a resistance to the discrimination that LGBTQ+ people faced. This marked the beginning of the modern LGBTQ+ movement that had taken an increasingly proactive stand in defining LGBTQ+ culture, specifically in mainstream media. LGBTQ+ activists began confronting repressive laws, police harassment, and discrimination. These demands for equal protection began to be viewed as legitimate news, but the legitimacy of the demands were still viewed as questionable.

LGBTQ+ political activists began to pressure Hollywood to end its consistent negative portrayals of homosexuality in media. Responding to the movement, growing visibility in films began to emerge. However, themes of the reality for LGBTQ+ people were minimized or totally obscured.

In news, the emergence of more explicit and serious segments of LGBTQ+ people began to emerge. In 1967, CBC released a news segment on homosexuality, a compilation of negative stereotypes of gay men. The 1970s marked an increase in visibility for LGBTQ+ communities in media with the 1972 ABC film That Certain Summer. The film was about a gay man raising his family, and although it did not show any explicit relations between the men, it contained no negative stereotypes.

The response to LGBTQ+ efforts for an increased positive presence and an end to homophobic portrayals of homosexuality in media, directly led to the members of the National Association of Broadcasters Code Authority agreeing to adopt the NAB Code, to guarantee that the LGBTQ+ community would be fairly treated in media. Although not a binding agreement, networks began to take precautions and consult LGBTQ+ communities before running programs portraying homosexuality. This led to the presence of LGBTQ+ characters beginning in prime time television, although in minimal amounts or in episodes that concentrated on homosexuality. Nevertheless, such presentations were greeted as signs of greater social acceptance.

==== 1980s and the emergence of the AIDS epidemic ====
With the emergence of the AIDS epidemic and its implicit relation to gay men, media outlets varied on their coverage, portrayal and acceptance of LGBTQ+ communities. The Moral Majority, the Coalition for Better Television, and the American Family Association began to organize boycotts against sponsors of television programs that showed homosexuals in what they viewed as a positive light.

Media coverage of LGBTQ+ communities varied during the 1980s depending on the location and therefore the nature of the market and management of the organization. For example, in San Francisco, The San Francisco Chronicle hired an openly gay reporter and ran detailed stories on LGBTQ+ topics. In contrast The New York Times refused to use the word "gay" in its writing, preferring to use the term "homosexual", as it was perceived as a more clinical term, and continued to limit its coverage of LGBTQ+ issues, in both verbal and visual form.

The AIDS epidemic forced mainstream media to acknowledge the existence of LGBTQ+ communities, and coverage increased. Some news coverage began to distinguish between "innocent" victims who had not acquired AIDS through homosexual contact and "guilty" victims who had. This coverage portrayed the LGBTQ+ community in a negative light and can be seen as a step back in the movement for equality. However, the AIDS epidemic forced the media to regard LGBTQ+ people in a more serious light. It also resulted in an increase in education regarding LGBTQ+ people and issues; editors and reporters began to learn more about LGBTQ+ communities and therefore became more sensitive to the tone with which they reported on their issues.

Furthermore, the increase in contact with the LGBTQ+ community lead to a greater emergence of LGBTQ+ figures in media as contacts were made during reports of the AIDS epidemic, as well as those speaking out and those who had contracted the virus themselves. This increase in contact led to an awareness of how homophobia was woven into the government's media responses to the AIDS epidemic and this paved the way for future movements.

==== "Bury your gays" ====
A recurrent pattern (a "trope") in the media portrayal of LGBTQ+ people is that queer characters face tragic fates, including death, much more often than straight characters. Across media, gay or lesbian characters tend to meet unhappy endings such as heartbreak, loss, insanity, depression or imprisonment. In many cases, they end up dying, either through suicide, homophobic attacks, illness or other means. Viewers called this trope "bury your gays" and "dead lesbian syndrome".

The use of “Bury your Gays” has evolved over time, once being used by queer artists to write about queer stories during times where laws akin to the Criminal Law Amendment Act of 1885 were in place, avoiding any sort of prosecution in order to have a queer story. Which then evolved to where those using “Bury your Gays” would use it where they would present queer characters in negative ways to associate negative or evil actions with gayness.

This reflection of once widespread homophobic storylines drew mainstream attention through publicized examples, such as the death of the character Lexa from the television series The 100 (2014-2020). The controversy and discussion resulting from these types of stories led some creators of popular fiction to consciously avoid harmful tropes and present more positive portrayals of LGBTQ+ characters.

== News coverage of LGBTQ+ events ==
Much of the negative media that surrounds LGBTQ+ communities have to do with pride parades that turn into riots. In recent years, there has been much more positive media coverage in relationship to LGBTQ+ people and families. Recently, a drag queen went viral on Tiktok for being hired to read to children at a local library, inspiring many parents (LGBTQ+ or otherwise) to respond with excitement, saying they would love to take their children to the event. Some examples of positive coverage are marches for same-sex marriage and shows like Ellen and RuPaul's Drag Race, both of which assists in giving the LGBTQ+ community a more positive outlook. Opponents argue that such displays of sexuality and nudity in public is not appropriate, although lately more shows depict lesbian and gay sexuality. News stories have often identified the opposition to these demonstrations as being led by Christian conservatives or strong believers of the Islamic religion, and not political figures. Many of the views against the LGBTQ+ communities are symbolic racism: people argue against nudity in public because it violates their traditional values.

Media are designed to be a reflection of society and different communities. Mainstream media channels like CBS are the most watched and a highly underrepresented media outlet for the LGBTQ+ community. Media is a business that requires an audience and ratings. To achieve this, people who they feel will be watching are targeted. People of color are becoming leaders, but major media outlets, such as newspapers, magazines, and TV, are refusing to acknowledge their existence. Historically, news coverage has only covered homonormative LGBTQ+ people.

Framing becomes a useful tool to identify how people of the LGBTQ+ community are represented. Depending on the audience that is listening to the news, the object and definition of queerness changes. Queerness and the LGBTQ+ community become a debate depending of the targeted audience, either showing open displays, or remarks against them through religious lens. Perception of the LGBTQ+ community is then based on how news outlet presents their stories.

== Marketing to the LGBTQ+ community ==
LGBTQ+ communities have been targeted by marketers who view LGBTQ+ people as an untapped source of discretionary spending, as many couples have two income streams and no children. As a result, companies are advertising more and more to LGBTQ+ people, and LGBTQ+ activists use advertisement/slogans to promote community views, while balancing their heterosexual consumers so that they are not dissuaded from their products. Subaru marketed its "Forester" and "Outback" models with the slogan "It's not a choice. It's the way we're built", which was later used in eight United States cities on streets or in gay rights events. This statement has been used for years by LGBTQ+ people before the company decided to use the slogan. LGBTQ+ representation in advertising is measured in the LGBTQ+ Inclusion in Advertising & Media study by GLAAD and Procter & Gamble.

== Media representations of non-binary people ==
There are currently very few representations of non-binary people or characters in the media. Most of the non-binary representation happens in communities made by and for people who are non-binary, and contain largely self-made content.

One of the first prominent instances of a non-binary person being represented in popular media was the 2014 short film Break Free, created by Ruby Rose. As of 2023, the video had garnered over 54 million views.

Another very significant representation of a non-binary individual was Raine Whispers in Disney's The Owl House. They first appeared in an episode called Eda's Requiem, aired on July 24, 2021, and remained a core member of the cast until the show was cancelled at its third season. They were the first non-binary character in Disney, (and in general children's) media and remained an important and powerful figure throughout the rest of the show.

Just there has been little attention paid to representing non-binary gendered individuals in the media, there has also been little attention focused on recognizing or addressing that absence.

== History of LGBTQ+ music ==
LGBTQ+ music, or music that is either produced or sung by an LGBTQ+ individual, or music that is sung about the LGBTQ+ experience, debuted in the 1920s blues era. In the beginning of queer music, many songs discussed coming out, acceptance, Pride and Stonewall. In the 1970s, it switched to talking about people like Anita Bryant, San Francisco politician Harvey Milk and Dan White. With the rise of the AIDS epidemic, many queer songs in the 1980s and 1990s addressed the emotional (often anger, and grief), political and social aspects of the AIDS crisis.

=== 1920s–1930s ===
In 1935, Bessie Jackson (Lucille Bogan) released her song "B.D. Woman Blues" (the B.D. standing for Bull Daggers). Frankie "half-Pint" Jackson, another blues artist of this time, was known for singing as a female impersonator and in 1929 released a song titled "My Daddy Rocks Me With One Steady Roll". This period was also a time for "cross-vocals", which are songs intended to be sung by a woman but are sung by men instead, without changing pronouns. This came about in the 1920s and 30s when music producers would not allow singers to change a song's wording. This led to men singing about men and subsequently women singing about women without public scrutiny, because they were aware of the restrictions placed on the singers by the music producers. (An example of "cross-vocals" would be Bing Crosby and his recording of "Ain't No Sweet Man Worth the Salt of My Tears".) Also in the late 1920s and 1930s was The Pansy Craze. This was when openly gay performers suddenly became popular in major city nightclubs. Two of the most popular performers to emerge from this craze were Jean Malin, who sang "I'd Rather Be Spanish Than Mannish", and Bruz Fletcher in 1937 with "She's My Most Intimate Friend".

=== 1950s–1960s ===
Between the 30s and the 60s, Ray Bourbon was one of the most well-known female impersonators, in 1956 Ray changed his name to Rae Bourbon and released and album titled "Let Me Tell You About My Operation", in response to Christine Jorgensen's famous sex change, which had been dominating the news. In the early 1960s Camp Records released two albums which featured artists like Sandy Beech, Max Minty & the Gay Blades, and a song by Byrd E Bath called "Homer the Happy Little Homo". In response to this album, Teddy & Darrel released an LP called "These Are the Hits, You Silly Savages" with the hope that they could use the sale records to track down homosexuals; however, they were unable to do so because the sales were so spread out and diverse. In 1963 Jackie Shane released his song "Any Other Way" with the lyrics "tell her that I'm happy, tell her that I'm gay, tell her that I wouldn't have it, any other way" which reached No. 2 on the Canadian charts and in 1968 Minette was the first female impersonator to release an entire album which dealt with subjects such as the hippie movement, psychedelic drugs and Vietnam.

=== 1970s–1980s ===
The 1970s was the birth of glam rock and the pop punk gay scene, which included artists like David Bowie. In 1971, Maxine Feldman wrote a song called "Stonewall Nation" after participating in her first gay march in Albany, New York, and in 1972 she was the first openly lesbian to be elected as the delegate to a major national political convention. The 1970s also brought a lot of first for the Queer music scene. In 1973, "Lavender Country" was the first openly gay country album (20 years later, "Out in the Country" by Doug Stevens & the Outband was the second). Also in 1973, the first openly gay rock albums was produced by Chris Robison and his Many Hand Band, which included the song "Lookin' for a Boy Tonight", and Alix Dobkin formed her own record label called Women's Wax Words. She then went on to produce the album "Lavender Jane Loves Women", which was the first album to be produced, financed, performed, and engineered entirely by lesbians.

In 1974, Steven Grossman became the first artist to have a lyrically gay album, titled "Caravan Tonight" released by the major record label called Mercury. This album featured the song "Out" and was the first album with openly gay lyrics to be produced by a major record label. Finally, in 1977, Olivia Records released the first various artist album that featured solely lesbian performers. The album, Lesbian Concentrate, was produced in reaction to the bigotry of Anita Bryant and her anti-LGBTQ+ rights crusade.

In 1981, Rough Trade, a band led by Carole Pope, reached the Top 20 in Canada with their song "High School Confidential"; this is one of the first openly lesbian songs to reach the charts. That same year, Canadian artist David Sereda released his song "Underage Blues", which discusses what it is like to be a gay teenager. In 1983, La Cage aux Folles became the first musical with an openly gay central plot to be a big hit and featured the song "I Am What I Am".

In 1984, one of the earliest songs addressing AIDS was released by Automatic Pilot, a San Francisco-based group. The song was called "Safe Living in Dangerous Time". Although the song was recorded in 1984, the album was not released until 2005 because multiple group members died due to the AIDS epidemic. Also from LA came the rapping group Age of Consent, which was one of the first groups to ever have lyrically gay raps. One of their songs, called "History Rap", tells the story of the Stonewall Riots. In 1985, a rare performance by Christine Jorgensen, an entertainer who was known for having a sex change in the 1950s, was recorded.

=== 1990s–present ===
From the 1990s onwards, there appeared many queer singers, songwriters and musicians that belong to many genres. One example of a well-known queer artist is Meshell Ndegeocello, who entered the hip-hop scene in the 1990s. During this time Bill Clinton was elected president, and the gay and lesbian movement was still in full force from collective organization against AIDS in the 80s. Her song "Leviticus: Faggot" talks about the sexist and misogynist violence experienced by young, Black, gay men due to their identities. Some other more recent artists include Against Me! with their album Transgender Dysphoria Blues, ONSIND, Fridge Scum, and Spoonboy.

Through the Internet, and social media's widespread use, LGBTQ+ singer-songwriters started to gain popularity, artists such as Girl in Red, Cavetown, Dodie, and many others who found popularity online, have since become regarded by many as queer icons. On the 65th Grammy Awards, in February 2023, Sam Smith and Kim Petras won the award for Best Pop Duo/Group Performance for their single "Unholy", which also topped the Billboard Top 100, making Sam Smith and Kim Petras the first openly non-binary and first openly transgender woman to win a Grammy award, and also the first ones to get a number-one song on the US.

== Asexuality in television ==
Asexuality has received increasing recognition in media representation in recent years as well as the recognition of being included as a sexual orientation in the LGBTQ+ community. Although asexual characters still appear less frequently than other identities, they are becoming more visible throughout different genres of media. However, when asexual characters are represented, they are characterized as needing to be fixed/changed, or that they are less sexually desirable than other counterparts

Many characters that are identified as less sexually desirable often get labeled asexual. Bonnie Grape from What’s Eating Gilbert Grape and Norm from Cheers are often labeled as asexual as they do not fit within the realm of desirability due to their body type, since it contradicts the norm of sexuality. Since they do not have desirability, they lose the idea of being sexual.

Another example of this type of portrayal occurs in an episode of the popular TV show House, M.D. In the Season 8 episode "Better Half", a couple declare themselves happily asexual. However, the main character House's immediate reaction to their statement is "there must be some medical cause". He then sets out to prove that there is no way they can be asexual by choice. House eventually discovers a brain tumor in the husband that has been suppressing his sexuality. When this is revealed, his wife then admits that she said she was asexual purely to be with her husband, and that before they met she had enjoyed sexual encounters.

The show Sirens (US version) portrays asexuality through one of the main female characters, nicknamed Voodoo, and her asexuality is recognized and talked about throughout the series.

The Netflix animated television series Bojack Horseman has received acclaim from the community for its portrayal and discussion of asexual topics through the character of Todd Chavez, a main character, who comes out as asexual in the season 3 finale. In the fourth season, he discovers a group of people who also identify as asexual who help him learn more about his asexuality.

Calls for stronger asexual representation began upon the release of The CW's Riverdale, when the show's writers made the decision to exclude the asexuality of the character Jughead, canonically asexual in the Archie comics upon which the show is based, despite encouragements from actor Cole Sprouse to retain the character's sexual identification. The show went on to feature a homosexual character and a bisexual character, furthering evidence that Jughead's asexuality was intentionally unacknowledged by the writers as an LGBTQ+ identity.

On December 18, 2020, when asked if the colors of the librarian named Kaisa in Hilda were made to intentionally match the asexual flag, series creator Luke Pearson said that while he did not purposely make her colors match those of the aromantic flag in his rough design for the character, it was "not impossible" that her design, her hair and colors, matched the colors of the asexual flag because he did not draw the final design of the character in the show. The character has purple hair, a black cape, a gray shirt with white sleeves, all of which are colors on the asexual flag.

== Media portrayal of LGBTQ+ people of color ==
Overwhelmingly, the portrayal of LGBTQ+ people in the American media centers on white LGBTQ+ people and their experiences. LGBTQ+ persons of color are severely underrepresented in the media in comparison to their actual population within the community.

In GLAAD's 2023-2024 "Where We Are on TV" report, it was found that out of the 64 LGBTQ+-identified regular and recurring characters on mainstream broadcast networks, 48% were LGBTQ+ characters of color. Of the 77 LGBTQ+-identified regular and recurring characters on cable, 48% were LGBTQ+ characters of color. Of the 327 LGBTQ+-identified regular and recurring characters on streaming platforms, 50% were LGBTQ+ characters of color. Despite consisting of nearly half of the LGBTQ+ character pool across viewing services, GLAAD noted the overall decrease in the number of LGBTQ+ characters of color as compared to GLAAD's 2022-2023 "Where We Are on TV" report.

In GLAAD's 2024-2025 "Where We Are on TV" report, it was found that 40 LGBTQ+ series regulars on U.S. primetime scripted broadcast television, representing 9.3% of the 432 series regulars tracked. This shows a slight increase from the previous year's 39 LGBTQ+ series regulars.

"Popular television shows including Will & Grace, Sex and the City, Brothers and Sisters, and Modern Family routinely depict gay men. Yet the common characteristic among most televisual representations of gay men is that they are usually white." Having both a queer and Black or non-white character is creating multi-faceted "otherness", which is not normally represented on television. Additionally, while many shows depict LGBTQ+ people of color, they are often used as a plot device or in some type of cliché. Santana Lopez, for example, from the teenage dramedy Glee, is a queer woman of color; however, she is often characterized as a Latina fetish and over-sexualized. In Season 6 of Glee, Santana Lopez marries Brittany Pierce, a white bisexual. Along with these two characters, Blaine Anderson and Kurt Hummel are two important LGBTQ+ characters in Glee. Darren Criss, who portrays Blaine, is half-Asian, while Chris Colfer, who portrays Kurt, is white. In conjunction, Callie Torres, who was one of the first bisexual Latina characters on mainstream television, was first depicted as a "slut", and this Latina stereotype was used as much of her single plot-device.

Moreover, non-white LGBTQ+ characters are often depicted as "race neutral". For example, on the ABC Family show, GRΣΣK, Calvin Owens is gay and many of his storylines, struggles, and plots revolve around his self-identification as LGBTQ+. However, while being physically African-American, it is never mentioned in the show, and he is never seen as "explicitly Black".

As queer politics continue to become a defining part of the decade, television continues to reflect that. Starting with hits like Modern Family, gay homonormativity is becoming a mainstay on broadcast television. There has been a cultural shift from white, gay men being depicted as non-monogamous sex-seekers, stemming from the AIDS epidemic to being family-oriented like many heterosexual couples, while still maintaining their personal identities. In Modern Family, Cam & Mitch, a gay couple, adopts a baby girl, Lily, from Vietnam. In the pilot episode, Mitch discusses their reason for adopting Lily as feeling something missing from their family, something many heterosexual couples express when discussing their desire for children. However, Cam & Mitch still maintain pride in their identities of being in an LGBTQ+ relationship and how this informs their parenting of Lily. This is seen throughout the show. For example, there is a Mother's Day episode and the focus is on how Cam and Mitch talk about how they do not want to fit the heteronormative role of having a mother in the relationship but instead are proud of Lily having two dads. This Hollywood trend, while expanding LGBTQ+ representations on TV, is really only giving a single-story of LGBTQ+ communities and completely neglecting other LGBTQ+ stories.

One exception to the lack of LGBTQ+ people of color on television represented in a realistic, non-fetish or race-neutral way, is the ABC Family series The Fosters. The Fosters depicts a blended family of one biological child, two adopted Latine children, and two foster children being raised by a lesbian, multi-racial couple. One of the two foster children, Jude, a White male, was shown to be navigating his sexuality as the show went on, including the progression of a relationship with a boy at his school. This show also highlights the struggles of managing parenting boundaries amongst the LGBTQ+ couple and the biological father of Brandon, as seen early on in season 1. The couple, around whom the show is based, also struggles with race as source of conflict on top of their LGBTQ+ storyline. Another example of a show with LGBTQ+ people of color includes Netflix's show One Day at a Time that includes a Latina lesbian character who has many storylines that do not revolve around her LGBTQ+ identity.

In January 2015, GLAAD announced nominations for the 26th annual Media Awards. Many of these nominees included LGBTQ+ people of color. There have also been several series and shows that have started to represent this topic in a more "fair, accurate and inclusive" way. There is also support from well-known actors such as Channing Tatum, who will be presenting the award to the winner of the 26th annual Media Awards.

In September 2016, the coming-of-age film Moonlight premiered at the Telluride Film Festival. Released as the first LGBTQ+-themed feature film with an all Black cast, the film follows its main character through his childhood, adolescence, and adulthood, exploring his journey with his identity and sexuality as a Black, homosexual man from Miami. Following its release, it received mass critical acclaim and won Best Picture at the 89th Academy Awards, making it the first LGBTQ+ film to win the accolade.

In the same year, the South Korean psychological thriller film The Handmaiden, directed by Park Chan-wook, premiered at the 2016 Cannes Film Festival. Set in 1930s South Korea during the Japanese occupation, the film's story revolves around a developing lesbian relationship between a female con-artist and an heiress. The film received international critical acclaim for its lesbian representation and subversion of patriarchal power. However, the film has also been criticized by several publications for its sexually explicit scenes between the lead couple.

On December 30, 2020, Donnie Lopez published an article on Black Girl Nerds, lamenting the lack of an "animated gay Latino male superhero being the lead of his own show," saying that while there has been an increase in the number of "LGBTQ+ folks being presented on family animated superhero shows," this has mainly focused on lesbian and bisexual characters, without "gay male Latino/Hispanic superhero animated leads." Lopez added that maintaining, popularizing, and creating gay characters can start to assuage harmful attitudes, noting that shows seldom "give gay male POC characters the title roles" in children's animation, leading them to perpetrate the idea that "gay male characters cannot be standalone titular characters." Even so, he gives the example of Aqualad in the third season of Young Justice who is a bisexual Black man, while qualifying this by saying that Aqualad is "not the principal character of the show" and noting that while Super Drags did make gay men the protagonists, it "reinforced negative stereotypes" and hoped that the "lack of gay representation" in these animations could be remedies in the future.

In May 2024, the 77th Cannes Film Festival premiered the Oscar-nominated Spanish-language musical film Emilia Perez. The film depicts the story of Juan 'Manitas' Del Monte, a Mexican drug kingpin who disappears and transitions into a woman, Emilia Perez, to evade law enforcement. Spanish actress Karla Sofia Gascón portrays the titular character and in the 97th Academy Awards received an Oscar nomination in the Best Actress category for her performance. This made Gascón the first openly transgender actress to receive a nomination. Upon its release, the film garnered positive reviews from critics, who praised its performances and storytelling. However, it also faced criticism from Mexican and LGBTQ+ commentators for its portrayal of cultural and transgender stereotypes.

Another important note on Asian American queer representation is that mainstream white dominated media often overlooks the Racial/Ethnic Differences in the AAPI community. Andrew Grossman, the editor of the collection Queer Asian Cinema: Shadows in the Shade comments on how "Asia" is "a temporary term of convenience" and shows how films and representation in media for AAPI individuals are caused by political economy of global distribution so films can be identified as foreign so they are more exportable to the west. The AAPI is not a monolithic community, but are often lumped together in media representation. This is reflected in a one- dimensional character portrayal that hits the diversity quota, and not characters that realistically have stories that include their cultural background, tradition, and ethnicities.

Over time, we have seen little progression in representation of LGBTQ+ people of color. In GLAAD's 2025 release of the Where We Are on TV report, there was only a 1% increase of LGBTQ+ characters of color among all LGBTQ+ characters included in the study. There were significant decreases in certain populations, including LGBTQ+ Indigenous, Middle-Eastern/North African, and Black characters.

== Breakdown of LGBTQ+ representation ==
Over the past five years, there has been an increase in the number of regular and recurring LGBTQ+ characters in mainstream American media. Each population has experienced general growth in representation, some more than others. Gay characters are the most frequently depicted of the LGBTQ+ communities by a wide margin, followed by lesbian, bisexual, and transgender characters. However, heading into the new season, this trend will change in cable television with the number of bisexual identifying characters surpassing the number of lesbian characters for the first time. Additionally, the transgender community is the only one of the four to lose representation in media, declining from 2013 to 2014 on cable networks while losing representation entirely on broadcast networks. In terms of gender identity, as of GLAAD's 2023-2024 Where We Are on TV, the majority of the LGBTQ+ characters in broadcast media are female, though male characters follow within a close margin. Only one percent of characters identified as FtM (female-to-male transgender).

=== Television ===
Every year GLAAD releases a report, entitled Where We Are on TV, with percentages of expected regular and recurring LGBTQ+ characters on broadcast and cable, and the previous few years streaming and television. In recent years, the highest percentage or representation of LGBTQ+ characters in current mainstream television, both broadcast and cable, has been lesbian women and gay men.

In GLAAD's 2023-2024 report, it was revealed that there was "454 series regulars on 64 primetime scripted series on all five broadcast networks (ABC, CBS, The CW, FOX, and NBC) for the 2023-24 season. Of those, 39 series regulars are LGBTQ+. This is a decrease of 31 characters (44 percent) from last year's 70 LGBTQ+ characters". The representation of LGBTQ+ series regulars hasn't been this low since 2017. "A fraction of this decrease can be attributed to the Writers Guild of America and the Screen Actors Guild strikes halting production".

Some of the notable LGBTQ+ characters from television and streaming services are Will Truman and Jack McFarland on Will & Grace, Lexa and Clarke on The 100, Poussey Washington, Suzanne 'Crazy Eyes' Warren, Nicky Nichols and Alex Vause on Orange is the New Black, Willow Rosenberg and Tara Maclay on Buffy the Vampire Slayer, Callie Torres and Arizona Robbins on Grey's Anatomy, and Alex Danvers on Supergirl.

Other shows with LGBTQ+ characters include Modern Family, Pretty Little Liars, Orphan Black, Wynonna Earp, Sense8, Shadowhunters, The Bold Type, One Day at a Time, The Real O'Neals, The Fosters, Degrassi: The Next Generation, Stranger Things, Cobra Kai, Ellen, Love, Victor, Glee, Riverdale, Unbreakable Kimmy Schmidt, The L Word, Lost Girl, Queer as Folk, Heartstopper, Yellowjackets, Only Murders in the Building, Euphoria, and Black Mirror's "San Junipero" episode.

A more complete list of characters can be found on the pages List of dramatic television series with LGBTQ+ characters: 1960s–2000s, 2010–2015, 2016–2019, 2020s, and List of comedy television series with LGBTQ+ characters.

Broadcast television
Year	Lesbian	Gay	Bisexual women	Bisexual men	Transgender women	Transgender men	Expected series regular LGBTQ+ characters	Expected recurring LGBTQ+ characters
2012–2013	10	30	7	2	1	0	31 or 4.4% of all characters	19
2013–2014	14	21	8	2	1	0	26 or 3.3% of all characters	20
2014–2015	18	35	10	2	0	0	32 or 3.9% of all characters	33
2015–2016	23	33	12	2	0	0	35 or 4.0% of all characters	35
2016–2017	12	35	16	5	3	0	43 or 4.8% of all characters	28
2017–2018	21	40	16	6	1	2	58 or 6.4% of all characters	28
2018–2019	32	39	25	8	3	2	75 or 8.8% of all characters	38
2019–2020	40	38	21	9	2	4	87 or 10.2% of all characters	30

Cable television
Year	Lesbian	Gay	Bisexual women	Bisexual men	Transgender women	Transgender men	Expected series regular LGBTQ+ characters	Expected recurring LGBTQ+ characters
2012–2013	16	29	9	5	1	1	35	26
2013–2014	16	35	10	4	0	1	42	24
2014–2015	26	47	21	10	0	1	65	41
2015–2016	31	58	32	18	2	1	84	58
2016–2017	29	65	35	10	2	4	92	50
2017–2018	47	72	38	10	3	2	103	70
2018–2019	53	90	40	16	7	0	215	94
2019–2020	65	74	48	13	14	4	215	94

Starting in the 2015–2016 season, GLAAD started including original content created on the streaming sites Amazon, Hulu, and Netflix in the Where We Are On TV Annual Report.

Streaming sites
Year	Lesbian	Gay	Bisexual women	Bisexual men	Transgender women	Transgender men	Expected series regular LGBTQ+ characters	Expected recurring LGBTQ+ characters
2015–2016	21	23	9	3	4	1	43	16
2016–2017	28	15	12	4	7	0	45	20
2017–2018	25	17	21	2	5	0	51	10
2018–2019	37	39	19	9	7	3	75	37
2019–2020	46	64	21	14	5	4	109	44

In Will & Grace, Will Truman is presented as "straight passing" gay man who fits in with heteronormative society. Will's friend Jack, on the other hand, was used as comic relief and was presented as flamboyant and non-threatening. He represented the other stereotypical gay character and the opposite of Will. Because of Will & Grace, there are now more gay characters on television. Will & Grace also showed a wider audience that television shows with gay characters do not have to be all about the gay community, but can deal with more mainstream problems such as romance and fights with friends. Now, more television shows have gay characters without focusing on their sexuality, but rather making it another facet of the character such as their hair eye color or age.

=== Film ===
Starting in 2013, GLAAD started releasing a Studio Responsibility Index at the beginning of each year which reported on the quality, quantity, and diversity of LGBTQ+ characters in films released by 20th Century Fox, Paramount Pictures, Sony Columbia, Universal Pictures, the Walt Disney Studios, and Warner Brothers the previous year.

In 2012, 14 of 101 films had lesbian, gay, or bisexual characters and no films had transgender characters. Of the 14 films, 4 contained LGBTQ+ characters as major characters.

In 2013, 17 of 102 films had identifiable LGBTQ+ characters. That year, Lionsgate Entertainment was also included in the statistics. Most of the LGBTQ+ characters were found in comedies.

In 2014, 20 films out of the 114 tracked releases had LGBTQ+ characters. The depictions were mostly minor roles and regarded as stereotypes. Focus Features, Fox Searchlight, Roadside Attractions, and Sony Pictures Classics were also tracked this year for LGBTQ+ representation. There were 28 LGBTQ+ characters in mainstream films. There were no identifiable transgender characters.

In 2015, 22 of the 126 releases had identifiable LGBTQ+ characters. There was one film with a transgender character. There were 47 LGBTQ+ characters, an increase from the previous year.

In 2024, 59 of the 250 releases had LGBTQ+ characters. In 2025, it fell to 46 of 225 films, which is about 20 percent. It was the third year in a row that the number went down.

A few of the most notable LGBTQ+ films are Brokeback Mountain, Carol, Boys Don't Cry, Blue is the Warmest Color, Paris is Burning, Hedwig and the Angry Inch, The Kids are All Right, Milk, Victor/Victoria, Rent, and The Rocky Horror Picture Show.

=== Literature ===
An example of LGBTQ representation in literature is seen in the novel Stay and Fight, written by Madeline Ffitch, which portrays a nontraditional family structure centered on Karen, Lily, Helen, and a child, Perley, living together in rural Appalachian Ohio. The novel explores how their household challenges conventional expectations of parenthood and kinship, particularly regarding queer relationships and chosen family structures.

The novel Call Me by Your Name, by André Aciman, is another widely known example of LGBTQ representation in literature. The story follows a summer romance between Elio (17), a teenager living with his family in Italy, and Oliver (24), who is a graduate student staying with Elio's family for the summer. The novel touches on Elio's exploration of his queer identity through his undefined and complicated relationship with Oliver. In "Call Me by Your Name", readers are exposed to the idea of accepting one's queer identity, and how this affects a person throughout their life.

== New queer cinema ==
The term new queer cinema (NQC) was first coined by the academic B. Ruby Rich in Sight & Sound magazine in 1992 to define and describe a movement in queer-themed independent filmmaking in the early 1990s. In New Queer Cinema, author Michele Aaron states that films created during this time must meet the following requirements to be considered NQC:

The film must give voice to marginalized or underrepresented LGBTQ+ stories, defy cinematic conventions, resist positive imagery, disregard historical stereotypes, and defy death often in terms of AIDS.

Aaron states that much of the progress seen within the Hollywood film industry is due to the work of filmmakers and crews of NQC. Consequently, shifts in marketing have been implemented to target LGBTQ+ audiences.

== WebTV ==
The rise in web-based television, streaming, and other entertainment networks grant both affordances and limitations on LGBTQ+ representation in media. In Open TV: Innovation Beyond Hollywood and the Rise of Web Television, Christian suggests that the freedom of online networks presents new forms of cultural representation outside the traditional media system. Independent creators, entrepreneurs, and audiences are shaping the media networks in which they engage with. The alternate possibilities of online networks such as Open TV contribute to the increase in diverse storytelling and representations of marginalized communities.

In The Value of Representation: Toward a Critique of Networked Television Performance, professor and author Aymar J. Christian explores the foundations on which he established the platform Open TV in 2015 based in Chicago. Christian notes that by altering production, exhibition, and legacy (linear, one-to-many) media infrastructures, networked Internet distribution can challenge LGBTQ+ representations. Open TV provides an intersectional framework in which media representations of LGBTQ+ people can be challenged, assessed, and created. Christian argues that local and small-scale media development redefines the political and social values of representation in TV and art. Furthermore, Christian highlights that such representation methods illuminate the historically overlooked value of local communities and performances of culture.

Production and development inequalities are embedded within legacy media networks, yet corporate structures often profit from cultural representation. Christian questions the value placed on cultural representation and how it is intertwined in the economics of media creation and distribution.

As an advance to media representation theory, Open TV provides LGBTQ+ individuals, cis women, and artists of color the opportunity to create, distribute, and exhibit independent pilots, original series, or syndicated series. Open TV centers the production and exhibition of artworks around artists and their communities.

== LGBTQ+ representation in children's media ==
There have been increased occurrences of LGBTQ+ characters and themes in children's shows across channels such as Nickelodeon, Cartoon Network, and Disney Channel. Inclusion of these themes prompted the Parent's Television Council to release a report ranking Nick at Night and Disney Channel near-perfect in terms of child-appropriateness and rating accountability. Although not exclusively for children, "Animation has a long history of flirting with queerness... mostly through sissy characters and otherwise effeminate men... Depictions of female queerness are far rarer and more benign." Since 2010, cartoons have related to these general trends, particularly The Legend of Korra, SheZow, Adventure Time, and Steven Universe.

In 2008–2015, The Girl Bunnies by Françoise Doherty became the first children's animated series to have all of its lead characters LGBTQ+. These leads include lesbian and transgender children. The 4 short musical animated films have screened in 21 countries and have garnered awards in Montreal and Paris.

Nickelodeon's original show, The Legend of Korra became the first animated children's television show to portray a queer relationship. The show ends with main characters Korra and Asami holding hands and walking off into the background together. Writer of the series, Mike Dimartino, confirmed that Korra and Asami did in fact have romantic feelings for each other. The show has been credited with setting a precedent for more overt LGBTQ+ portrayal in children's animated shows.

SheZow, much like is a crime-fighter with a magic ring. However, it is a woman's ring, so it turns Guy, a 12-year-old boy into female superhero, SheZow. Show creator Obie Scott Wade called it a show about "responsibility" and "not so much about gender", stating "Guy does learn many things about himself by becoming SheZow... as an ordinary slacker who is suddenly forced to save the world, but with a unique story element that adds a lot of comedy." Guy does not "identify as transexual [sic]", and whether or not children perceive him as such, "from an adult perspective... secret identities were and still are, a huge part of what it meant to be a lesbian, gay, bi or transgender person."

Another show with very strong LGBTQ+ themes is Cartoon Network's Steven Universe created by Rebecca Sugar. According to Erik Adams "gender is at the forefront of... Steven Universe" but there are plenty of other queer themes within the series as well. In the episode "Alone Together" the main character Steven and his friend Connie fuse to become Stevonnie. When asked about the gender of the character Stevonnie, Sugar replied that "Stevonnie is an experience, the living relationship between Steven and Connie." She also says that "Stevonnie challenges gender norms as an individual, but also serves as a metaphor for all the terrifying firsts in a first relationship." In a public service announcement about self-esteem and self-image on social media posted to Cartoon Network's Twitter and Instagram accounts, Stevonnie's status as intersex and non-binary was confirmed. On July 6, 2018, the show depicted the first same-sex wedding on a Cartoon Network series, between the female characters Ruby and Sapphire. There are many more queer themes that arc across many episodes of this show, as well as its sequel series Steven Universe Future, such as a depiction of a non-binary character named Shep, as well as the unrequited love Pearl had for Rose, and the queer relationship between Bismuth and Pearl.

Cartoon Network's popular children's television show Adventure Time, created by Pendleton Ward, also has queer themes. One way that this show represents the LGBTQ+ community is through its deconstruction of heteronormativity. Australian media commentator Emma Jane says that Adventure Time is "a program which subverts many traditional gender-related paradigms." Jane also discusses the idea of gender fluidity within the show by pointing out characters that lack a fixed gender (i.e., BMO or Gunther) as well as characters possessing many traits that are traditionally gendered (i.e., eyelashes and hair) but those traits not having any bearing on their actual gender. The final episode of the show showed a kiss between the two female characters of Princess Bubblegum and Marceline the Vampire Queen.

Adventure Time is not alone in revealing a queer relationship in its finale. The final episode of the animated Disney Channel show Gravity Falls revealed two male cops, Sheriff Blubs and Deputy Durland, as a romantic pair. The finale of the 2018 Netflix original series She-Ra and the Princesses of Power featured a romantic confession and kiss between the two female leads, Adora/She-Ra and Catra. The show also featured a recurring lesbian relationship between supporting characters Spinnerella and Netossa, a gay couple as the dads of supporting character Bow, and a non-binary character named Double Trouble as an antagonist.

The Netflix original The Dragon Prince also displays LGBTQ+ themes. In Season Two, the show received criticism over the deaths of two lesbian characters, Queens Annika and Neha, die, leaving behind a child. The following season, the show revealed the male character Runaan to be in a relationship with another male character, Ethari.

Disney's first ever gay kiss appeared in their animated series Star vs. the Forces of Evil.

The film Love, Simon is notable as the first film by a major Hollywood studio to focus on a gay teenage romance.

In 2017, Disney Channel's Andi Mack made history with the depiction of the character Cyrus Goodman (portrayed by Joshua Rush), making him Disney Channel's first-ever character to come out as gay. On February 9, 2019, Andi Mack yet again made television history when Cyrus came out to his male best friend, Jonah Beck (Asher Angel), saying "I'm gay", making him the first Disney character to ever use the word "gay" in its modern meaning. Cyrus developed mutual feelings for the captain of the basketball team, TJ Kippen (portrayed by Luke Mullen), and in the series finale, these feelings were made apparent and the two held hands, marking the start of the first romance between two male characters and the first gay romance involving a main character in Disney history.

In July 2020, CBBC aired an episode of The Next Step featuring two teenage girls kissing. Prior to the scene, characters Cleo (Dani Verayo) and Jude (Molly Saunders) were written to confess their feelings for each other, and begin a relationship together. The scene made history as the first same-sex kiss to be aired on the channel. Amidst both praise and criticism, the BBC defend the scene by stating: "CBBC is proud to reflect all areas of children's lives, including age appropriate representation of same sex relationships". The moment generated over 100 complaints, to which the BBC defended it, saying: "We believe that the storyline, and the kiss, was handled with sensitivity and without sensationalism, following as it did the portrayal of Jude and Cleo's developing relationship and I am afraid we do not agree that it was inappropriate for the audience age".

On December 15, 2020, Petrana Radulovic of Polygon argued that 2020, when it came to all-ages animation, was a "glorious gay celebration that was unheard of just five years ago," including the love confession of Adora and Catra in the last episode of She-Ra and the Princesses of Power, Amity's romantic crush on Luz in The Owl House, the ending of Steven Universe, and the gay love story between Troy and Benson in Kipo and the Age of Wonderbeasts, and the development of Marceline and Bubblegum's relationship in the "Obsidian" episode of Adventure Time: Distant Lands. She specifically said that Obsidian was a "perfect end to this big gay year in animation," while noting that there is still work to do going forward. David Opie, Deputy TV Editor of Digital Spy said that he saw himself reflected in the final episode of She-Ra and the Princesses of Power, saying it was the first time he had "seen two lead characters enjoy queer domestic bliss so openly and without fear of reprisal," and said that he had long "settled for stories with ambiguous queer undertones" but this show went beyond that, part of an effort to create a better world.

In 2020, the popular children's show Bluey aired the episode Dad Baby, which depicted Bluey's Dad pretending to give birth to Bluey's younger sister, Bingo. The episode has been withheld on Disney+ in the US and is under review for being deemed inappropriate for children. The reason why the episode is withheld has not been disclosed by Disney. It leaves the public with many questions, whether it's being withheld due to it being too graphic with its birth scene, or the idea of a male-identifying person giving birth to a child does not align with heteronormative ideals and the US agenda of what a birthing person should look like.

Disney’s The Owl House was written by Dana Terrance, premiering January 10th, 2020. This animated television show hosts a wide array of queer characters that go from the protagonist Luz, who is bisexual, to a secondary character like Raine Whispers who is nonbinary. Which also includes smaller unspoken moments like showing that one of the main characters, Willow, has two dads. In this series we see Luz’s development of romantic feelings with another main character Amity, who is lesbian. By the last season we see a fully committed relationship that highlights a kiss between the two. The series provides a new cultural norm by being within the fictional world of the boiling isles by providing a widespread and openly queer cast. While being queer was never the conflict of the show, the aspects of living in countering a body that seeks to control and normalize a specific behavior occurs. Even characters who are not queer or have a disability, we see that they do not follow our human norm. Characters like Odalia take on the "male role" in her relationship with her husband: which continues the trend that The Owl House had in breaking the norms that our society has and creates it own culture.

In June 2021, Abbey White of Insider stated that more than 90% of LGBTQ+ characters in children's animation are in shows that "require either a cable, satellite, streaming, or internet subscription to view them on first airing," cutting off those without paid TV or internet from seeing "animated representation meant to represent them." David Levine, the head of Moonbug Entertainment, which owns Cocomelon, said that kids television on broadcast networks has disappeared, adding that "a crazy percentage of animation, of any kind, is behind a 'paywall'" in part because of the rise of cable television and end of syndicated cartoon blocks. White also said this happened due to the growing popularity of cable television, FCC regulations on children's programming, and companies seeing cable as a money-making venture. They noted that advertisers played a role, indirectly, in "curbing LGBTQ+ animated kids' content on free stations," with shows disappearing if the content of a program is "deemed controversial by an advertiser," with the showrunner of The Hollow saying that networks take fewer chances and try to be safer due to their advertisers. Levine also noted that this differs from streaming services, where a person can "always vote" with their dollar, meaning that subscriptions can be ended if a user doesn't like the content. White further said that while many have pointed to YouTube as an "answer to the dearth of inclusive and free kids programming," it isn't free to access because content on the platform is often "age-inappropriate" and locked behind a paywall of its own. They also said that despite the decline of physical releases, streaming apps connected to them, which allow users to "download and save episodes to watch later without the internet". Other creators were even noted as cheering quietly for the "pirating of their content" or share curated clips from their respective shows. Complementing this, McInroy and Craig's 2017 qualitative study of LGBTQ emerging adults demonstrates that media representations play a significant role in how young people understand their identities. Their participants described traditional media as still dominated by narrow and stereotypical portrayals- white, cisgender and gay male-centric- but also acknowledged that even limited representation could help them feel less alone. The study found that new media offered more diverse, participatory and empowering depictions, allowing LGBTQ individuals to see more of themselves and their communities.

== Social acceptance ==
As stated by Jason Jacobs, queer people are demanding for culture to be more accepting of them. In an attempt, shows such as Glee, are created where most of the characters have an identity that marginalizes them in some way. Some of the characters are gay, lesbian, disabled, and or belong to some other minority group. However, within these characters, there are homonormative aspects. The goal is for the disabled and minority characters to feel empowered about their differences and strive to be "normal". While it can be appealing to show characters that are queer fall under certain norms, this can make way for negative stereotypes as queer people are only represented with a heteronormative or traditional mindset.

Additionally, there is increasing focus on queer baiting within mainstream television, where shows court the LGBTQ+ "pink money" with heavy use of subtext to imply a queer pairing, but never following through with the subtext and risking alienating their more conservative-minded audiences.

São Paulo speaks about a city's effort to decrease the discrimination against gay pride by planning to create new laws protecting people from the negativity of it all. It is said that they also plan to create a gay museum dedicated to all of those who have put in efforts for equal rights for the LGBTQ+ community. This new law is said to be taking place in Brazil, with the hopes that many will follow in their lead. Paulo says, "The activists and parade organizers said a law that would ban discrimination against lesbian, gay, bisexual and transgender people is overdue in Brazil".

== Media portrayal and social change ==
The perceptions that people have of LGBTQ+ can change from watching LGBTQ+ portrayal in media. Many people feel that seeing LGBTQ+ people in the media can bring about more acceptance and awareness by peers and families. According to an article published by Zerebecki et al. (2021), "Can TV shows promote acceptance of sexual and ethnic minorities? A literature review of television effects on diversity attitudes," the parasocial contact theory states that viewers have the ability to form strong one-sided bonds with characters on-screen. These parasocial bonds can resemble friendships. Therefore, when audiences repeatedly encounter positive portrayals of minority characters, these relationships can eliminate possible negative beliefs and prejudices. It has been shown that in the show Will & Grace, viewers who form this parasocial contact with the gay character Will would lead to lower levels of bias towards gay men.

Media portrayal of LGBTQ+ people has also further advanced activist movements for LGBTQ+ populations, especially where American history is concerned. LGBTQ+ people have recently gained more visibility for their positive contributions to movements for social change. For example, in the documentary United in Anger: A History of ACT UP, LGBTQ+ people of diverse backgrounds are recognized for their integral role in securing greater access to healthcare for those living with AIDS as well as national attention for a population largely ignored by the government and other important institutions.

The change in the portrayal of LGBTQ+ over time is positive. In the 1990s on ABC, Roseanne featured an episode in which a woman briefly kissed another woman and this was preceded by a viewer discretion warning. However, ABC aired an episode of Grey's Anatomy in 2011 ("White Wedding" - 7.20) showing a lesbian wedding between the characters Callie and Arizona. This was before same-sex marriage was state-wide legalized as this happened in 2015.

The change in representation of racial diversity in the LGBTQ+ community is advancing towards a more equal standpoint. In the early stages of television, there was hardly any media representation of people of color at all, let alone LGBTQ+ people of color. However, as media and its audience are evolving the willingness to show more racial diversity on a global scale. This attempt at equality is to make people of all gender, race, class, ethnicity and sexual orientation feel as though they are represented fairly and evenly. Specific steps taken towards this goal are the use of different diverse characters on television. As well as the diverse characters, GLAAD is also making it a point that LGBTQ+ people of different races can have professions like doctors, teachers, etc. This takes away the single focus on their sexual preference or race etc., and displays the complexity of these characters as they would with any straight or white or middle class person.

In a 2013 Pew Research report, 49% of respondents agreed that LGBTQ+ characters in television and film "help a lot" in making society more accepting of people who are LGBTQ+. A 2019 study found that LGBTQ+-inclusive TV leads to "modest yet positive effects" on viewers' attitudes towards lesbians and gays. A 2020 study found that online exposure to LGBTQ+ content through news and social media (referred to as parasocial contact) had a positive influence on attitudes towards the LGBTQ+ community. Similarly, in the context of Russia's full-scale war against Ukraine, a 2025 analysis of digital news platforms revealed that the media representation of LGBTQ+ communities shifted towards a dominant narrative of "desecuritization through joint defense." This framing highlighted the community's participation in national resistance, coinciding with a rapid rise in public support for equal rights.

== LGBTQ+ media advocacy organizations ==
Many LGBTQ+ organizations exist to represent and defend the gay community. For example, the GLAAD in the United States and Stonewall in the UK work with the media to help portray fair and accurate images of the LGBTQ+ community. While their goals aligned with this expression of equality and integration within society, they also stood to critique matters of Anti-LGBTQ+ discourse, as well as endorsement of people and events that promoted a positive views of the LGBTQ+ community.There are many other LGBTQ+ advocacy organizations in the United States that are all working for the same cause, equality.

== See also ==
- Media portrayal of bisexuality
  - List of media portrayals of bisexuality
- Media portrayal of lesbianism
- Media portrayals of transgender people
  - List of transgender characters in film and television
- Queer coding
- Queerbaiting
