= Johnlock =

Fandom pairing of Holmes and Watson

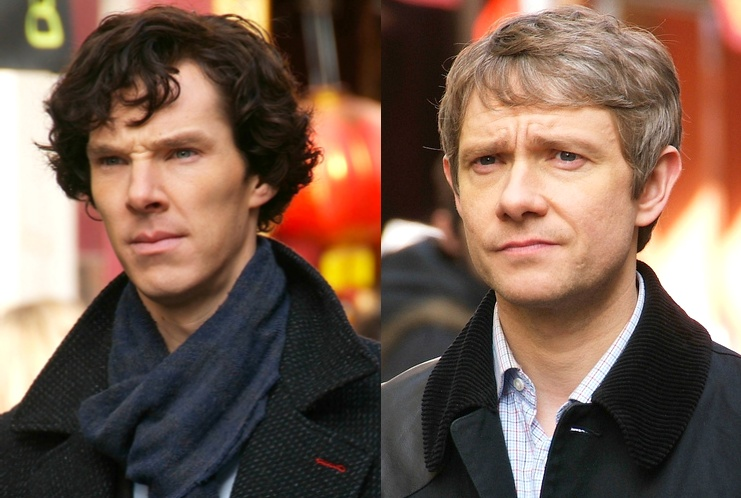
Benedict Cumberbatch (left, as Sherlock Holmes) and Martin Freeman (right, as John Watson), during the filming of Sherlock

Johnlock (short for John/Sherlock) is the fan nickname for the hypothetical romantic relationship ("ship") between the character Sherlock Holmes and his companion John Watson as depicted in the BBC series Sherlock (2010–2017). Fan artwork and slash fiction of the two as a romantic or sexual pairing became popular on Tumblr, particularly among young queer women, and Sherlock Holmes/John Watson remains a common pairing on the fan fiction site Archive of Our Own.

Some fans and academics have accused the show of queerbaiting—subtextually hinting at the possibility of romance between its two male leads to attract an LGBTQ audience, without ever making the romantic reading explicit. In interviews, John's actor Martin Freeman, and showrunners Mark Gatiss and Steven Moffat denied that this was their intention, saying the show's "gay references", such as Sherlock and John being repeatedly mistaken for a couple, were meant as jokes.

A fan theory called The Johnlock Conspiracy (TJLC) speculated that showrunners had intended a romantic reading, and planted various clues that the ship would eventually become canon within the show, though this never materialized.

== Background ==
The BBC television series Sherlock is an adaptation of Arthur Conan Doyle's Sherlock Holmes stories. It depicts Sherlock Holmes (played by Benedict Cumberbatch) and his associate John Watson (played by Martin Freeman) solving mysteries together in present-day London. The show was co-created by showrunners Steven Moffat and Mark Gatiss.

Queer readings of Sherlock Holmes precede the 2010 show. The 1970 film The Private Life of Sherlock Holmes, for instance, heavily implies that Holmes is gay. This adaption is one of Gatiss' favorite movies, and he has said that he believes the Holmes in the film to be in love with Watson. Moffat, while writing for Doctor Who, added a married lesbian couple based on Watson and Holmes. In the 2003 book Strangers – Homosexual Love in the Nineteenth Century, author Graham Robb argued that Doyle's original Holmes was coded as gay and had a "distinctly homosexual lifestyle". Fandom scholar Anne Jamison, in the book Fic: Why Fanfiction Is Taking Over the World, quotes an anonymous fan describing Sherlock Holmes as the "First Fandom Ever", and Holmes/Watson as "the first slash ship sailin' the seven seas".

== The pairing ==
Peek at a few fiction websites for Sherlock and you'll find tales of a mantel-bound skull that talks; an army doctor who's also a werewolf, or vampire, or teacher; a consulting detective with wings, or grease and gears instead of flesh and bone; and again and again you'll find two men who give their hearts—and bodies—to their one and only friend. And, though there's plenty of kid-friendly fic, there's also sex, sex, so much sex.

— Author Wendy C. Fries, "Mad as a Box of Frogs", in Fic: Why Fanfiction is Taking over the World

As of 2018, about half of the over 116,000 Sherlock works on the popular fanfiction site Archive of Our Own (AO3) were tagged as Sherlock Holmes/John Watson, with the slash indicating a romantic relationship. As of 2022, Johnlock was the second most popular pairing on AO3, after Castiel/Dean Winchester ("Destiel") from Supernatural. The same year, it was ranked as the 72nd pairing by number of new works added, reflecting a significant decrease in fandom activity from when the show was airing. Johnlock shipping was most prominent over the show's 2010–2017 run.

Most commonly, fans portray Sherlock as gay and John as bisexual, though there are many other interpretations. Sherlock, who claims to be "married to his work", is sometimes read as asexual or aromantic. While low relative to the absolute amount of Sherlock fanfiction on the site, in 2015 Sherlock works represented almost 40% of the works with asexuality-related tags on AO3.

Some fans and critics have argued that the text of the show encourages the subtextual reading of romantic interest into the relationship between the two leads. Characters in the show repeatedly mistake Sherlock and John's relationship as romantic, which John denies with increased frustration or anger. While John has several heterosexual relationships within the show, and eventually marries a woman, Mary Morstan, his relationships with women are often presented as secondary to his relationship with Sherlock. One paper analyses John's relationship with Mary as maintaining his stated heterosexuality and allowing Sherlock to express feelings towards John that would be read as queer without her presence. Some Johnlock shippers lashed out against Amanda Abbington, who played Mary. She received death threats from fans angry that John was getting a serious love interest who was not Sherlock.

Cassandra Collier, in a M.A. thesis for Bowling Green State University, analyzes Johnlock fanfiction as "subverting social norms of desire and sexuality" and avoiding the homonormativity that other slash ships often fall into. She compares the Sherlock fandom and several representative works of fanfiction to Supernatural, arguing that Johnlock fanfiction typically avoids traditional romantic storylines. The Sherlock fandom also commonly portrays the characters with complicated or ambiguous sexualities or non-normative sexual practice such as BDSM. According to Collier, Johnlock fanfiction often frames their relationship as a "fixation or obsession", resulting in stories about unhealthy relationships or nonstandard romantic arcs. Sherlock, who self-describes as a "high-functioning sociopath", is written as an outsider, and his perspective is often used to defamiliarize romantic relationships. Meanwhile, John is a more conventional character, and his perspective is used as a more familiar reader stand-in. In Johnlock fanfiction, his narrative arc often involves subverting this conventionality through his connection to the unconventional Sherlock.

== Fandom ==
Johnlock fans have been observed to be usually neurodivergent and queer women, with media historian Diana Anselmo stating in that "in my eighteen months of observation-participation on Tumblr, I have never encountered a member of the Johnlock community who identified as heteronormative and cis male". The Johnlock fandom largely grew on the social media site Tumblr, while Sherlock fans on other sites tended to be more resistant to the idea of a romantic relationship between the characters. Fans write fanfiction, create art and videos, and discuss and analyze the show through the lens of their romantic interpretation of the relationship between John and Sherlock.

Poet Richard Siken has written Johnlock fanfiction. Romance author Kara Braden's first published novel The Longest Night was a revised version of her Johnlock fanfiction "Northwest Passage" with the central romance changed to a heterosexual one and the names of the characters and other identifying details changed.

=== The Johnlock Conspiracy ===
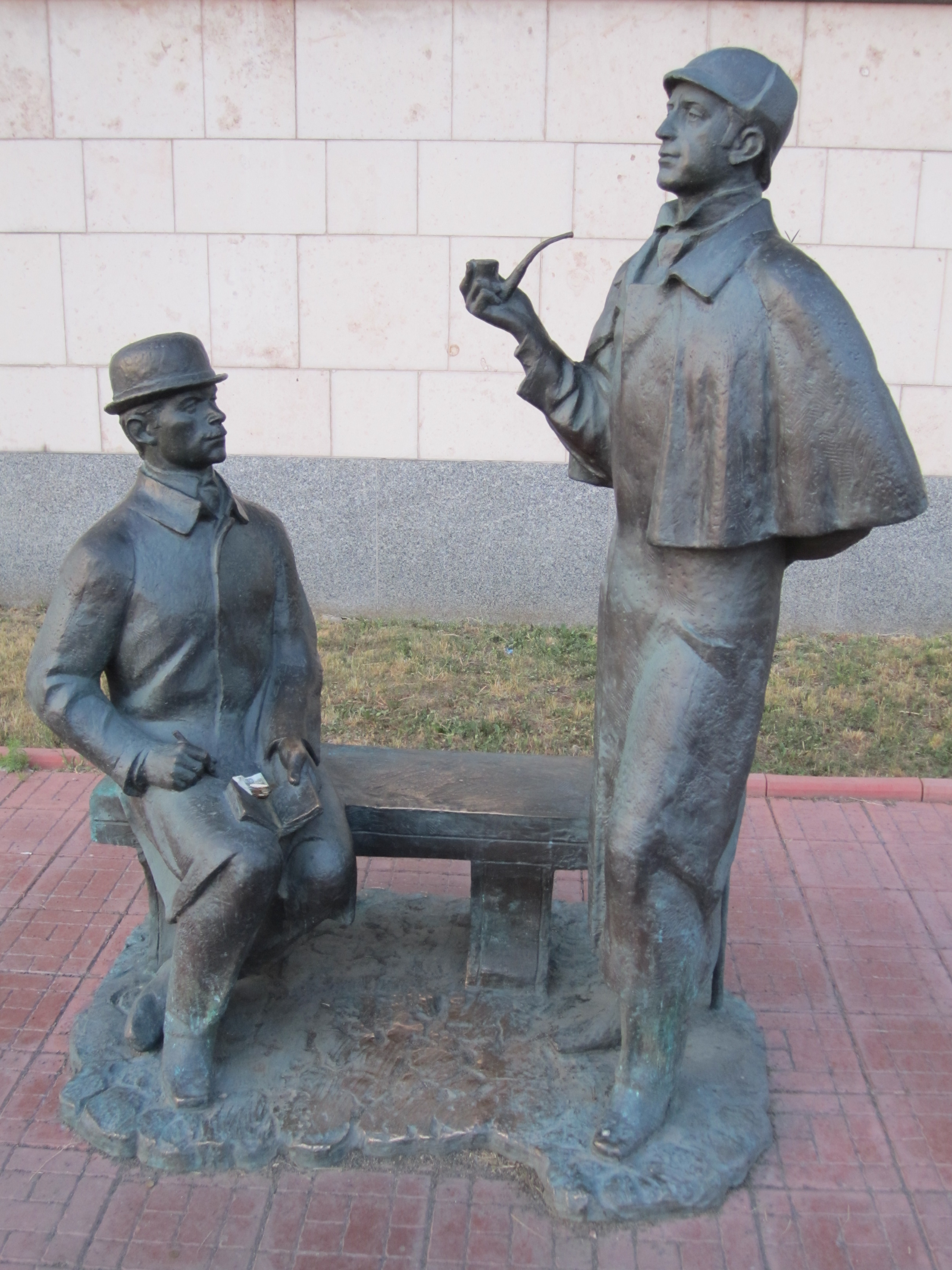
Holmes and Watson statues in Moscow

Some fans believed that the romantic reading was intended by the show's creators Steven Moffat and Mark Gatiss and that John and Sherlock would officially become a couple, a theory known as The Johnlock Conspiracy (TJLC). This theory gained prominence on Tumblr after the release of the third series in 2014. Both showrunners have repeatedly denied intending to portray anything but a platonic relationship between Sherlock and John. The showrunners have repeatedly been accused of queerbaiting.

TJLC fans relied on close readings of the show and interviews with the cast and crew to make their argument. Evidence they used included the incoherent plot of series three and four which fans claimed only made sense with a romantic reading, a BBC report on its interest in developing LGBT content, and "the set designer's fondness for elephants", which Johnlock fans considered a coded symbol for the "elephant in the room" of John and Sherlock's love for each other. The extent of the theories has been partially attributed to the two-year pauses in between series, which gave fans a long period of time to develop ideas without new source material. The showrunners had been known to lie to prevent spoilers, which contributed to some fans' dismissal of their denials of a romantic relationship between John and Sherlock.

Some fans of Sherlock, including ones that themselves ship Johnlock, strongly dislike TJLC, referring to it as "cult-like" and "crazy". TJLC has been criticized for harassment and doxing of other fans. Pop culture scholar E. J. Nielsen argues that the switch of fandom culture from Livejournal to Tumblr, and a lesser degree Twitter, contributed to the spread of TJLC and the harassment that non-TJLC fans faced from TJLC fans. Tumblr, unlike Livejournal, has more public and easier shareable posts, creating more open communities that allow content to escape beyond the confines of its intended audience. Posts can be tagged for the ship they contain, and TJLC fans would sometimes use those tags to harass fans of other Sherlock ships, especially heterosexual ones involving John or Sherlock.

Fans that believed in TJLC were so convinced that the fourth series would end with John and Sherlock becoming a couple, that after the final episode aired they began to expect a secret fourth episode, even watching the unrelated miniseries Apple Tree Yard in the hopes that it would be the "real" final episode. Some fans reported mental health issues following their disappointment that the fourth series did not include a romantic relationship between John and Sherlock.

== Accusations of queerbaiting ==
In the course of the first nine episodes and holiday special, John and Sherlock's relationship is read as queer by a restaurateur, their new landlady Mrs. Hudson, John's ex-girlfriend, married gay innkeepers, lesbian dominatrix Irene Adler, Mrs. Hudson again (after she has known John for at least two years), and the in-universe British tabloid press, among others.

— E. J. Nielsen, The Gay Elephant Meta in the Room

Both academic critics and members of the Sherlock fandom have argued that the show engages in queerbaiting: implying a queer relationship between Sherlock and John in the show without explicitly showing it, while denying it in interviews, social media posts, and other commentary by the showrunners and actors. Sherlock is one of the most prominent examples of media accused of queerbaiting, and one of the primary sources of academic scholarship on queerbaiting.

Freeman, who plays John Watson, has described the series as "the gayest story in the history of television", while elsewhere denying that he played John as having a romantic interest in Sherlock. Showrunner Gatiss has said that "ambiguity is what's interesting" about the nature of the relationship between Sherlock and John, and the showrunners have said that "the gay references were included as a joke". The showrunners and the actors have expressed frustration at fans interpreting the relationship between the leads as anything but platonic. Freeman, for instance, has complained about fans' "absolute insistence that Sherlock and John are a couple, should be a couple, have always been a couple", while Moffat dismissed Johnlock shippers as fetishizing gay male sexuality.

Marketing material for the series sometimes catered to the romantic interpretation, such as a Twitter post by BBC Three describing Sherlock and John as "so married it's ridic [sic]" or the same account replying "no comment" when asked if they were part of TJLC. After the fourth series ended without a romantic relationship between the leads, fans sent formal complaints to the BBC under the hashtag "#Norbury", claiming that the show had engaged in queerbaiting.

== See also ==
- Conformity Gate, conspiracy theory regarding the TV series Stranger Things similar to the Johnlock Conspiracy's claims of a second, "real" finale
