= Anne Jamison =

Anne Jamison may refer to:

- Anne Jamison (academic)
- Anne Jamison (singer)
