= Destiel =

Fandom pairing between two Supernatural characters

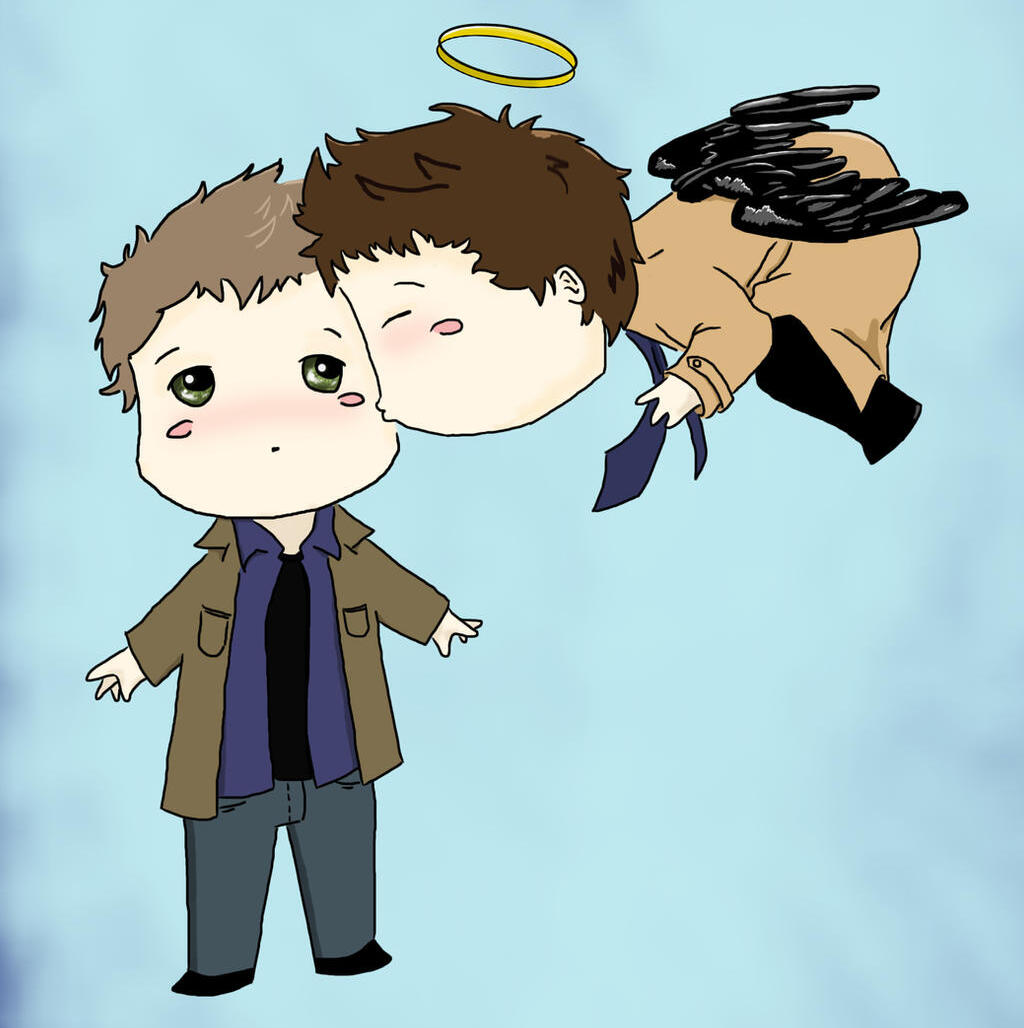
Castiel (right) kissing Dean (left) in Destiel fan art

Destiel, occasionally referred to as Deancas, and as CasDean within the series itself, is a ship (a fan-desired romantic pairing) of the characters Dean Winchester and Castiel within the Supernatural TV series.

== Background ==
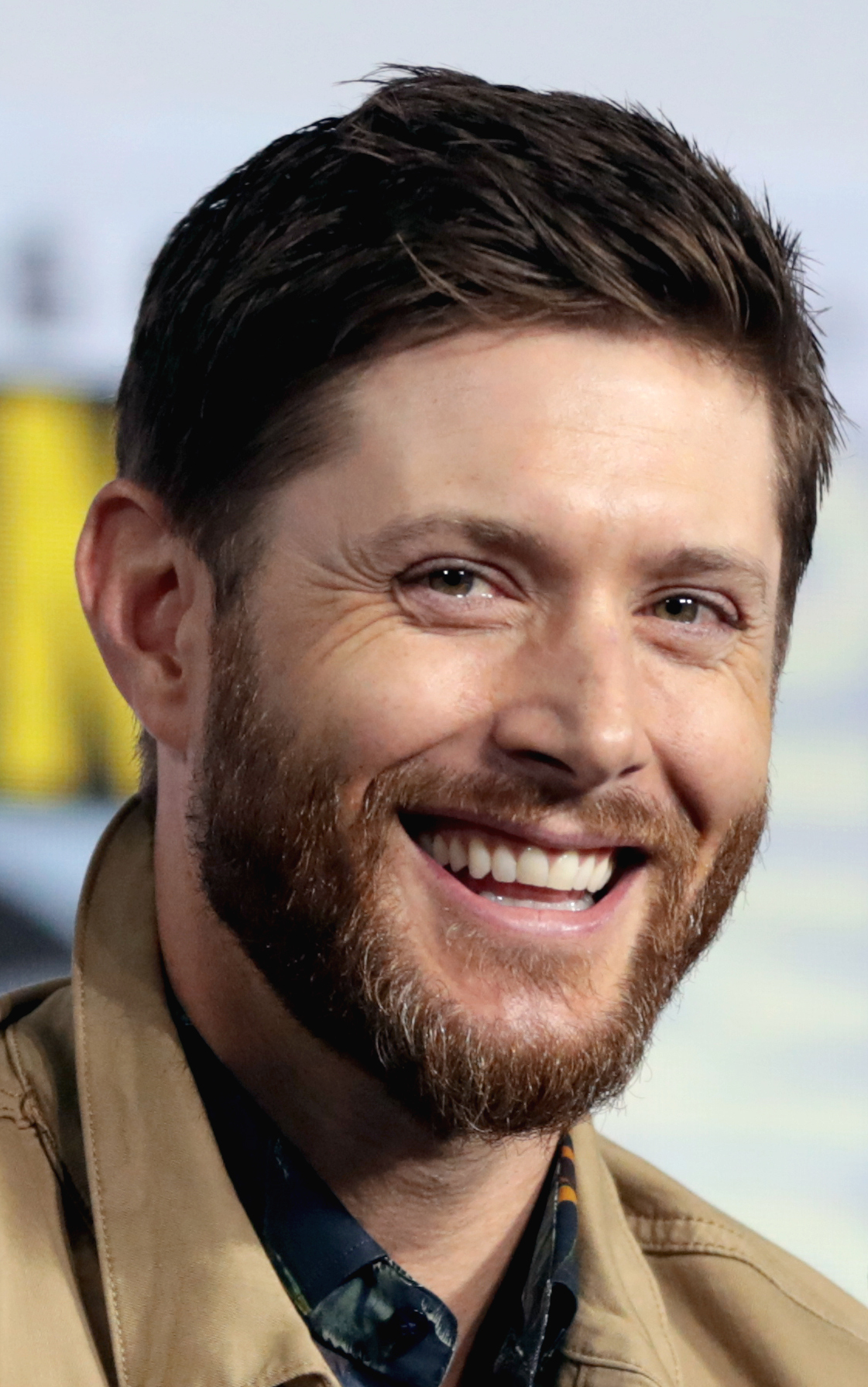
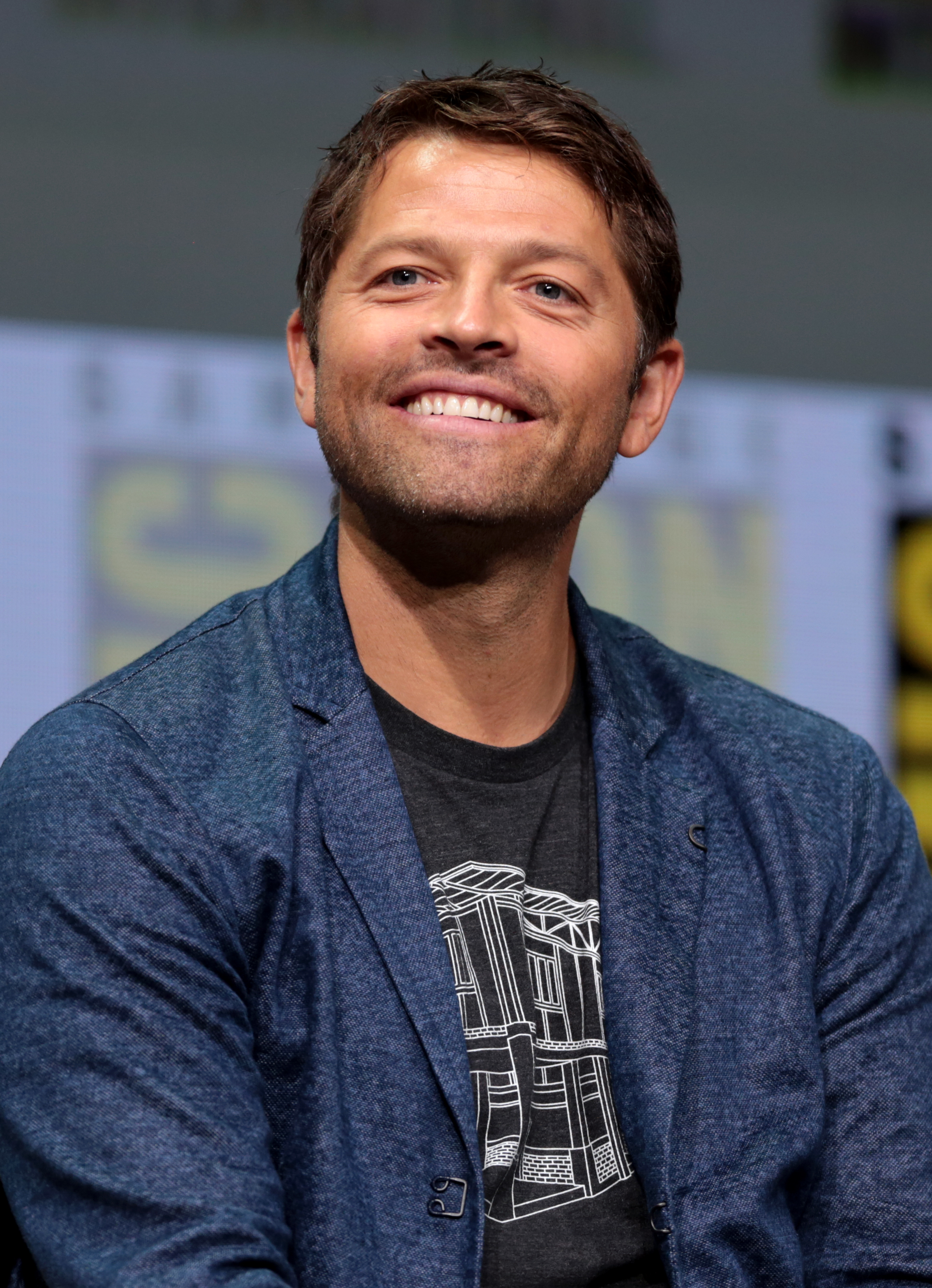
Jensen Ackles (left) and Misha Collins (right), respectively, depict Dean Winchester and Castiel in the series

The American television series Supernatural first aired in 2005 as part of a trend of fantasy shows targeted at teenagers. The show features the brothers Sam and Dean Winchester hunting supernatural beings. Castiel is an angel introduced in the Season 4 premiere, "Lazarus Rising", in which he rescued Dean by pulling him out of Hell. From this episode, fans wanted the two characters to become romantically involved with each other. Castiel became a series regular after appearing in the fourth season, and was viewed as the fan favorite character independently of the ship.

The show had very few queer characters, and most of them were minor roles. An exception was Charlie Bradbury (Felicia Day), who lead to further encouragement of the show to introduce more queer characters. In the years following Supernatural's premiere, television series with explicitly queer characters, such as Glee and Teen Wolf, began airing, leading to greater acceptance of queer main characters. As a result, fans began to believe that a ship between two men, such as Destiel, could become canon.

== History ==
=== Dismissed by conventions and creators ===
The ship became increasingly popular, with 15,000 fan fictions written about it by 2013, and actors Jensen Ackles and Misha Collins would get asked about it at fan conventions. Fans continued to encourage the series to have the two characters express romantic interest in each other despite often being met with hostility.

At the 2013 Supernatural New JerseyCon, it was reported by fans that a convention organizer had prohibited shipping related questions because they allegedly made Ackles uncomfortable. During a panel, Collins was receptive to questions about Destiel. Later, one fan began to explain that they were bisexual and had noticed subtext within the show, leading Ackles to interrupt the fan, say he was "going to pretend [not to know] what the question was", and encouraged the fan not to "ruin it for everybody". This created controversy within the Supernatural fandom about whether such questions were invasive or whether the show's treatment of fans and LGBT characters was inappropriate, as well as leading to criticism of Ackles on social media.

In 2014, a fan was banned from the fan event ChiCon for being an alleged safety threat to actors Ackles and Jared Padalecki due to shipping Destiel. Fandom members heavily criticized ChiCon, who later clarified that the fan was not banned from future conventions.

In 2013, producer Chad Kennedy posted on Twitter the characters were unlikely to get together in the series. He explained that while he supported the idea of bisexual protagonists on television, it was not the intention for Dean and Castiel and that he would only support it if it served the story. This was met with controversy as Castiel had recently been involved in a story in which he had a sexual encounter with a woman that fans suggested did not serve the plot. Fans also suggested that the two characters being romantically involved would advance the plot of show. As a result, Kennedy received many negative messages, leading him to post again comparing himself to Damon Lindeloff, who after receiving backlash for sexism in the film Star Trek Into Darkness (2013), deleted his own Twitter account. Kennedy's departure from Twitter led some fans to accuse others of bullying him. He later returned to Twitter, saying that he simply needed time off after the incident.

At a 2026 convention, both Ackles and Collins firmly denied Dean reciprocated Castiel's love, with both saying they wouldn't have found it believable. Ackles reaffirmed that he had never portrayed Dean as romantically in love with Castiel and added that, while filming Castiel's confession scene, he had played the scene as more a "familial situation, like if someone was coming out to their parents or their family."

=== Social media interactions ===
In 2014, the restaurant chain Olive Garden posted on Twitter about Dean and Sam's food preferences. When asked about Castiel, the account replied that they would eat anything from Dean's plate, which was interpreted by fans to be a reference to Destiel.

That same year, the ship was the most reblogged ship on Tumblr, notably beating John Watson and Sherlock Holmes from Sherlock, Kurt Hummel and Blaine Anderson from Glee, and Emma Swan and Regina Mills from Once Upon a Time. Destiel remained among the top ships for the following several years. Its popularity gradually decreased on Tumblr, as Supernatural fans migrated to other sites. It remained popular in fan fiction on other platforms. In 2019, Destiel became the top ship on Archive of Our Own with over 20,000 works more than the second most popular ship (Sherlock and Watson). The ship continued to be popular after the end of the series in 2020. On August 9th, 2021, the pairing reached over 100,000 works, the first ship to do so in Ao3 history. In 2026, the pairing continues to be first, with the "Castiel/Dean Winchester" tag containing over 127,000 works.

In August 2023, poet Richard Siken posted on Twitter that he had attempted to write for Destiel as well as Wincest and that his Destiel writing was better.

In September 2024, when Chili's posted on Twitter about the relationship between Evan Buckley and Thomas Kinard in the television series 9-1-1, a Supernatural fan commented, comparing it to Olive Garden having previously posted about Destiel. Chili's responded to the post, referring to Destiel as "the inferior ship". Chili's eventually deleted their post due to the backlash from Destiel fans.

== In Supernatural ==
=== Teased and referenced ===
Fans of Supernatural often interpreted Dean and Castiel's interactions as containing homoerotic subtext. Throughout the show's eighth season, such subtext was read into the two characters saying "I need you" to each other at crucial plot moments, as well as the episode "Goodbye Stranger", in which Dean says "I love you" to Castiel, a line later changed to "I need you" at Ackles' suggestion.

By 2013, the showrunners were described as having a "grudging respect" for Destiel fans. The ninth season of the show featured a scene intended to mock Destiel shippers that was ultimately cut from the episode. Collins was also given a note by showrunner Jeremy Carver to act like a "jilted lover" toward Dean that season. Viewership of the series continued to increase in the ninth season, which was in part attributed to Destiel shippers.

The Season 10 episode "Fan Fiction" introduced the term Destiel into Supernatural. In the episode, an all-girls school puts on a musical adaptation of the in-universe Supernatural book series that publishes Dean and Sam Winchester's adventures, allowing the series to comment on its own fanbase. At one point in the episode, Dean comments on the unlikelihood of Destiel getting together, leading to the young girl to whom he was talking rolling her eyes and continuing to write her fan fiction. Sam spends the episode teasing Dean about the ship. The Daily Dot described the episode as an improvement to its relationship with its fans and an explicit encouragement for fans to continue shipping Destiel. However, TV Guide reported on the episode as less supportive of the fandom and a firm statement that the producers do not support Destiel, describing it as a denial of the creators' role in encouraging queer readings of the series and a dismissal of the ship by the series as "cute".

The series further teased the relationship in its twelfth season, with Castiel saying that he loves Dean before turning to other characters and adding that he loves all of them. Due to instances such as this, the show was often accused of queerbaiting, with one article from The Daily Dot pointing out that it occurred behind the scenes as well in DVD extras. Despite the subtlety of these references, they were still seen as significant to fans of Destiel.

=== Becoming partially canon ===
External video
- Scene where Castiel confesses his love

In the season 15 episode "Despair", Castiel admits his love for Dean in what was described as a "tear-stricken confession" while being pursued by the personification of Death. The confession satisfied a deal Castiel had made the season prior that meant he could only die after experiencing true happiness. After the confession, the entity with which Castiel made the deal appeared and took both him and Death to the Empty (an afterlife for angels sometimes compared to Hell), saving Dean's life. Castiel's final words are "Goodbye, Dean", mirroring his catchphrase, "Hello, Dean". He also leaves a handprint on Dean's shoulder, just like the one left by Castiel in the fourth season.

The episode was written by Robert Berens, a gay man who had previously written several scenes involving Castiel and Dean which were viewed as romantic by audiences. Wanting the moment to be special, episode director Richard Speight Jr. made sure that it was the last scene Collins filmed. That night, the term "Destiel" managed to trend on Twitter alongside the 2020 United States presidential election results, which were being calculated the same night.

In the English version of "Despair", Dean's only response to Castiel's confession was asking him not to sacrifice himself. Gizmodo claimed that due to this, Destiel was in fact not part of the series' canon. However, in the Spanish translation aired several weeks after the original, Dean responds by saying that he loves Castiel in return. This led to backlash toward The CW as people believed the network to have censored the scene in the English version. However, Collins later said that this was the result of a "rogue translator" changing the dialog in the Spanish translation, not censorship in the English version.

== Analysis ==
=== Before Castiel's confession ===
The Daily Dot noted that Destiel fans were especially strong in the hope of their ship becoming canon, partly due to the lack of representation for gay men in television, and that the ship was unlikely to become canon due to the series' perceived poor record of representation. They referred to the ship as the fandom's "most controversial subject", a sentiment which was echoed by Vanity Fair.

In discussing the incident surrounding Chad Kennedy's deletion of his Twitter accounts, fans noted that the issue was larger than this specific ship. The show had very few queer characters, and people noted that the larger issue of representation of queer people was at play in the way people discussed Destiel. Despite this, The Daily Dot still suggested that such an attitude would cause a bad relationship between the fandom and the production team. They noted in later articles that the fandom had a notably contentious relationship with the series' creators, suggesting that Destiel was likely responsible for the series continuing to have a large fan base.

The series was often accused of queerbaiting in regards to Dean and Castiel, which Collins called unfair. TV Guide noted several instances in which queerness was referenced in relation to Dean, particularly regarding his relationship with Castiel. In reacting to "Fan Fiction"'s perceived dismissal of Destiel, they claimed that the writers were encouraging queer readings of the series, and that the consistent denial of the storylines existing comes from series' creators instead.

=== After Castiel's confession ===
Castiel's confession scene in "Despair" was met with heavy criticism. One notable example was the scene being accused of perpetuating the bury your gays trope.

Digital Spy further criticized the show for Ackles' performance in that scene, saying that Dean looked uncomfortable, and referred to the scene as "queer-baiting taken to its most disappointing extreme." This sentiment was echoed by several other reports on the episode, including one by Vulture which noted that Dean does not return Castiel's confession, describing it as an attempt by the show to avoid having an actual queer relationship onscreen. Some viewers did not see the confession as one of romantic love, but rather as platonic.

Den of Geek analyzed Castiel's history as a character, identifying him as a "well-developed queer icon". They identified queer coding in the character from the beginning and the way Castiel saw Dean, and criticized Supernatural for not utilizing that potential. They also noted that Dean not reciprocating the confession would likely be changed in fan fictions, saying it was unfortunate that Supernatural left that part of their relationship out of the series.

The reactions were not entirely negative, as The Mary Sue argued that despite the negativity of the bury your gays trope, it was still a major success that the series had managed to bring those feelings into the series' canon after its long run and significant use of romantic subtext. They criticized fans who blamed The CW, citing the significant amount of representation of queer characters on the network prior to Castiel. Further, Polygon noted that many of the reactions and memes online were in fact positive.

The episode led to various memes, including ones noting the timing of reports that Russian president Vladimir Putin was planning to resign (which later proved to be false) coming out on the same day as "Despair" airing, often implying a connection between the two. These memes became the means through which many people learned about Putin's alleged resignation.

Collins, who had previously been supportive of Destiel fans and queer fans in general, first defended the choice from the writers, labeling the criticisms of the scene as unfair. The night the episode released, he posted on Twitter referring to Castiel as "openhearted", "selfless", and "true". He stated that he was happy with the ending for his character, noting that the series finale established that Castiel was not dead and was instead in Heaven. He acknowledged the death playing into the bury your gays trope at an online convention, but added that since Castiel was established to have not been saved and that his declaration allowed Dean to save the world in the penultimate episode, "Inherit the Earth", he did not believe that the trope applied. He said he was disheartened by the amount of criticism the ending received, and that he wanted people to enjoy the good parts of it. Collins received backlash for these comments, and later posted an apology, explaining that he was naive in believing that Castiel's confession would feel validating and that he would listen to fans explaining why it was not.
