= Queerbaiting =

Marketing technique for fiction

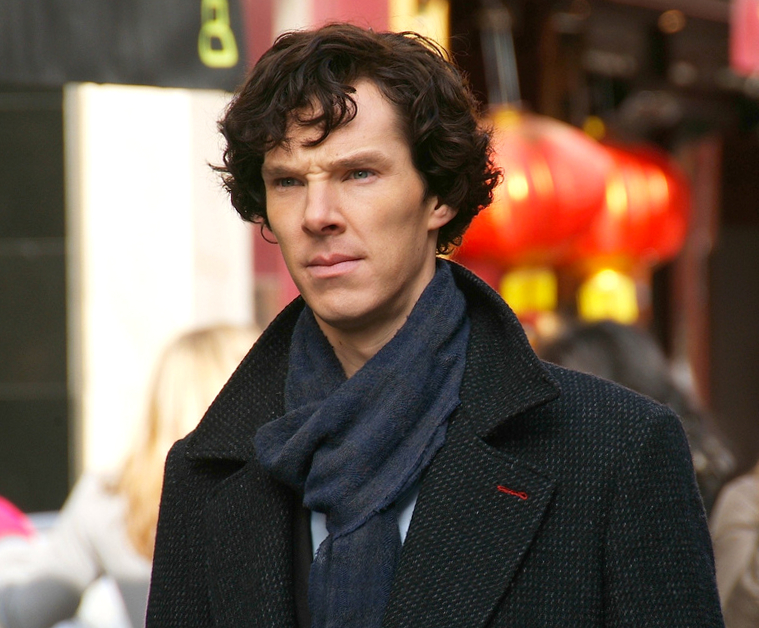
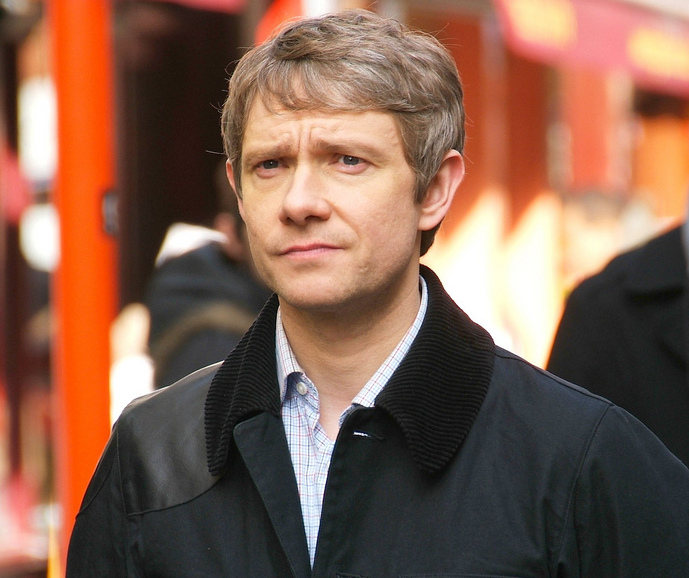
The cast and crew of the television series Sherlock have denied that the relationship between the characters Sherlock Holmes (left) and John Watson is meant to be seen as romantic, although some fans interpret it that way. Some critics have described the depiction as queerbaiting. (Note: Attributed to multiple references:)

"Queerbaiting" is a marketing practice that hints at, but does not depict, same-sex romance or other LGBTQ+ representation. According to scholars, cultural critics and fans, this is intended to attract ("bait") a queer or straight ally audience with the suggestion or possibility of queer relationships or characters, while not alienating homophobic members of the audience or censors by explicitly portraying those relationships or characters.

Accusations of queerbaiting have been made towards films, television series, books, music, advertisements and other forms of media, but also towards celebrities who express an ambiguous sexual identity through their works and statements. However, the idea that real people can queerbait is an opinion of much contention.A common opinion is that a person's sexuality or gender identity is very private and not for public consumption in the same way a fictional work is.When applied to real people, queerbaiting is often used to harass public figures into outing themselves to "prove" why they should be allowed to portray a queer character or express their gender identity in a way that is not socially traditional in western society. The term arose in and has been popularized through discussions in Internet fandom since the early 2010s. It comes from a larger history of LGBTQ+ discourse in media representation dating back to the 1970s from subtle marketing to LGBTQ+ people through commercials and books.

== Assessments ==
=== Queer audience concerns ===
Julia Himberg, a professor of film and media studies at Arizona State University, claimed that queer identities have been used and commodified by media producers to convey an "edgy identity".

Fans have derided, for instance, queer characters being used as plot devices rather than as characters for their own sake. Glee, for example, a series with many queer series regulars, was criticized by fans for presenting "superficial stereotypes of queerness for dramatic effect".

Queer fans consider queerbaiting as "a way to throw us a bone when we normally wouldn't have anything, to acknowledge that we're there in the audience when the powers that be would prefer to ignore us." Emmet Scout wrote that "queerbaiting works on its audience because it offers the suggestion that queer people do have a vital place in these stories, that they might even be the defining figures, the heroes. The suggestion—but not the reality." Rose Bridges summarized the practice's effect on queer fans as receiving "just enough" representation "to keep us interested, but not enough to satisfy us and make us truly represented."

=== Critiques ===
Critics of those who engage in queerbaiting discourse point to its similarity, and perhaps confusion by audiences, with subtext. Subtext became popular in media, especially in film, during the 1930s due to the Hays Code which limited what can be shown on screen. The use of subtext has been a literary ploy to tell a variety of stories since. However, those who engage with modern queerbaiting discourse firmly argue that LGBT representation no longer needs to be in the shadows of media. Instead of adding artistic value, queer fans view this tactic as perpetuating LGBT marginalization for further capitalization.

=== Societal shifts ===
Media scholars such as Eve Ng have noted that audience complaints about queerbaiting parallel the shift towards increasing queer representation in media and pop culture. According to Ng, as representation has increased, so too have expectations for that representation—and frustrations arise when those expectations are not met. She noted that rather than simply being satisfied with any degree of representation, queer audiences want to be represented through "respectful and meaningful depictions." That is why, according to media researcher Julia Himberg, the ambiguous sexuality projected by twentieth-century entertainers such as David Bowie, Elton John and Madonna was not scrutinized to the same degree as that of their successors.

Various businesses and corporations, such as Starbucks, Ben & Jerry's, and Tylenol have showcased queer people and queer families in advertisements, helping to normalize and increase awareness surrounding the queer community.

Queerbaiting has brought the spending power of the queer community to light, and businesses make economic decisions that promote and support the queer community and its representation that ultimately entices the pink dollar. Terms associated with the queer community, like pink money, have shown the importance of queer people within an economy and a society.

In May 2020, reviewer Sophie Perry, writing for a lesbian lifestyle magazine, Curve, noted how queerbaiting has long endured in LGBTQ+ representation, noting how She-Ra and Harley Quinn both had same-sex kisses, happening within stories that could have turned out to be "typical queerbaiting" but did not. Perry added that the "queer conclusion" of the She-Ra and the Princesses of Power is thanks to ND Stevenson, describing it as very different from the conclusion of The Legend of Korra, which confirmed Korra and Asami's relationship but left it "purposefully ambiguous" so it could air on a children's network. She concluded by calling She-Ra and the Princesses of Power culturally significant and added that as more creative queer people come to the fore, inevitably queerbaiting will "become a thing of the past".

In March 2021, a writer for Vanity Fair, Joanna Robinson asked when "queer coding" veers into the territory of "queer baiting", with Dana Terrace saying it happens a "lot in modern anime", and Robinson saying this is also seen in shows like the end of Supernatural or the "hubbub around Finn and Poe in The Rise of Skywalker".

== Examples ==
=== Companies and brands ===
Disney has been accused of queerbaiting on several occasions, with Kodi Maier of the University of Hull arguing that "Disney is willing to create animated films and television shows that suggest queer content, but only so long as it doesn't damage its conservative image." The directors of Avengers: Endgame had spoken in interviews about believing it was "a perfect time" to include queer representation in the franchise, however, it turned out to be a single line said by an unnamed secondary character in the film. TheWrap cited the close friendship between Poe Dameron and Finn in Star Wars: The Rise of Skywalker as one example of queerbaiting. The Disney films Beauty and the Beast (2017) and Cruella (2021) were described by critics for Screen Rant and USA Today as having queer characters but portraying queerness in a way that was either hinted at or a brief background that could easily be missed, asserting that this portrayal indicated that these films were queerbaiting audiences.

=== Fiction ===
There have been various characters, or relationships between characters of the same sex, which have also been interpreted as examples of queerbaiting by at least some reliable media sources and commentators. This interpretation is not necessarily shared by all critics or fans considering the sensitive nature of the topic.

Characters in some films and series falling within the superhero genre have been noted as examples of queerbaiting. Josh Engel of the New York Times and scholar Michael McDermott in the chapter of a 2019 book entitled Queerbaiting and Fandom: Teasing Fans through Homoerotic Possibilities described the relationship between Kara Danvers and Lena Luthor in Supergirl as one example. Reviewers for Polygon, The Gamer, and The Washington Post said that the films Thor: Love and Thunder and Thor: Ragnarok queerbaited audiences with the characters Valkyrie (both films) and Korg (first film). Okoye and Ayo in Black Panther and Bucky Barnes and Steve Rogers in Captain America: Civil War were cited by reviewers for Full Circle Cinema and CBR as other examples.

Certain procedural, crime, police, teen, and comedy dramas were described as having character relationships that could be considered queerbaiting. Screen Rant and PinkNews cited Evan "Buck" Buckley and Eddie Diaz in 9-1-1 as one example, while AfterEllen and scholar Mélanie Bourdaa said the same about Jane Rizzoli and Maura Isles in Rizzoli & Isles. Reviewers for The Daily Dot, Autostraddle, and The Next asserted that the relationship between Sherlock Holmes and John Watson in Sherlock was another example, even though the cast and crew denied this was the case. Other reviewers pointed to other series as examples. One critic for Bustle said the same about the relationship between Betty Cooper and Veronica Lodge in Riverdale. Critics for The Advocate, Teen Vogue, and Georgia Voice asserted the same was the case for relationship between Derek Hale and Stiles Stilinski in Teen Wolf.

Some critics described specific musical, romantic, and black comedy films and series with queerbaiting between characters. Beca and Chloe in Pitch Perfect were described as one example by Them and Film Inquiry. AfterEllen cited Max Black and Caroline Channing in 2 Broke Girls as another example. The Spectator said the same about Rachel Berry and Quinn Fabray in Glee. Viewers and critics for PinkNews and Junkee alleged the same between Wednesday Addams and Enid Sinclair in Wednesday.

Others described certain fantasy films, and other media, as queerbaiting. Critics for Den of Geek, Capital FM, and The Guardian pointed to possible queerbaiting in two media within the Harry Potter franchise. This included Albus Dumbledore and Gellert Grindelwald in Fantastic Beasts: The Crimes of Grindelwald and between Albus Severus Potter and Scorpius Malfoy in Harry Potter and the Cursed Child. CBR asserted the same between Qing Ming and Bo Ya in The Yin-Yang Master: Dream of Eternity.

Reviewers pointed to some animated series as having queerbaiting. Polygon noted that queerbaiting controversy over Voltron: Legendary Defender, between Shiro and Adam was addressed by the series co-creator Joaquim Dos Santos. Other critics for TheGWW and CBR asserted the series Naruto queerbaited between Sasuke Uchiha and Naruto Uzumaki, Anime News Network asserted the same between Izetta and Princess Finé in Izetta: The Last Witch. The relationship between Kumiko Ōmae and Reina Kōsaka in Sound! Euphonium was described as queerbaiting by Fotogramas and Anime News Network. In contrast, Christopher Farris and Steve Jones of Anime News Network disputed that the series was queerbaiting was misguided and erased "the concept of bisexuality" and Misty Schultz stated in Anime Feminist the series had "queer subtext".

This contrasted to those series that did portray a same-sex relationship after being criticized for queerbaiting. Killing Eve was criticized by The Independent, Cosmopolitan, The Guardian, CBR, and Meaww for queerbaiting with main characters Eve and Villanelle's relationship during seasons 1 and 2. The two characters then kissed one another in season 3. In the series Supernatural, the relationship between Castiel and Dean Winchester, sometimes referred to under the shipping name "Destiel", was seen as queerbaiting by fans as noted in The Advocate. In the fifteenth season, Castiel confesses his love to Dean immediately before dying, prompting criticism that the show was playing into the "bury your gays" trope as noted in Polygon and BuzzFeed News.

=== Social media ===
On April Fool's Day 2020, content creators, who were mostly straight men, started to post short videos and challenges on social media, mostly TikTok and Instagram, lip-syncing to will.i.am's "Boys & Girls" and pretending to come out as bisexual. In 2021, Alpha House influencers were accused of queerbaiting, while other straight web personalities received the same accusations. Some influencers came out after being accused of queerbaiting. Noah Beck was also accused of queerbaiting while he kept confirming his identity as straight.

Many "challenges" or "trends" on TikTok or Instagram were accused of queerbaiting. This includes kissing others of the same gender, posting false coming out narratives, or falsely claiming to be in a same-sex relationship. Many celebrities, including Billie Eilish and Normani, were accused of queerbaiting for their posts on Instagram.

Although this has been criticised, others have argued that the popularity of this trend is an example of the growing acceptance of LGBT people and (among males) a homosocial embrace of a "softer" form of masculinity.

== See also ==
- LGBTQ marketing
- Media portrayal of LGBTQ people
- Pinkwashing (LGBTQ)
- Rainbow capitalism
- LGBTQ themes in Western animation
- LGBTQ themes in anime and manga
- Queer coding
