= Wincest =

Romantic relationship between brothers in the TV show Supernatural

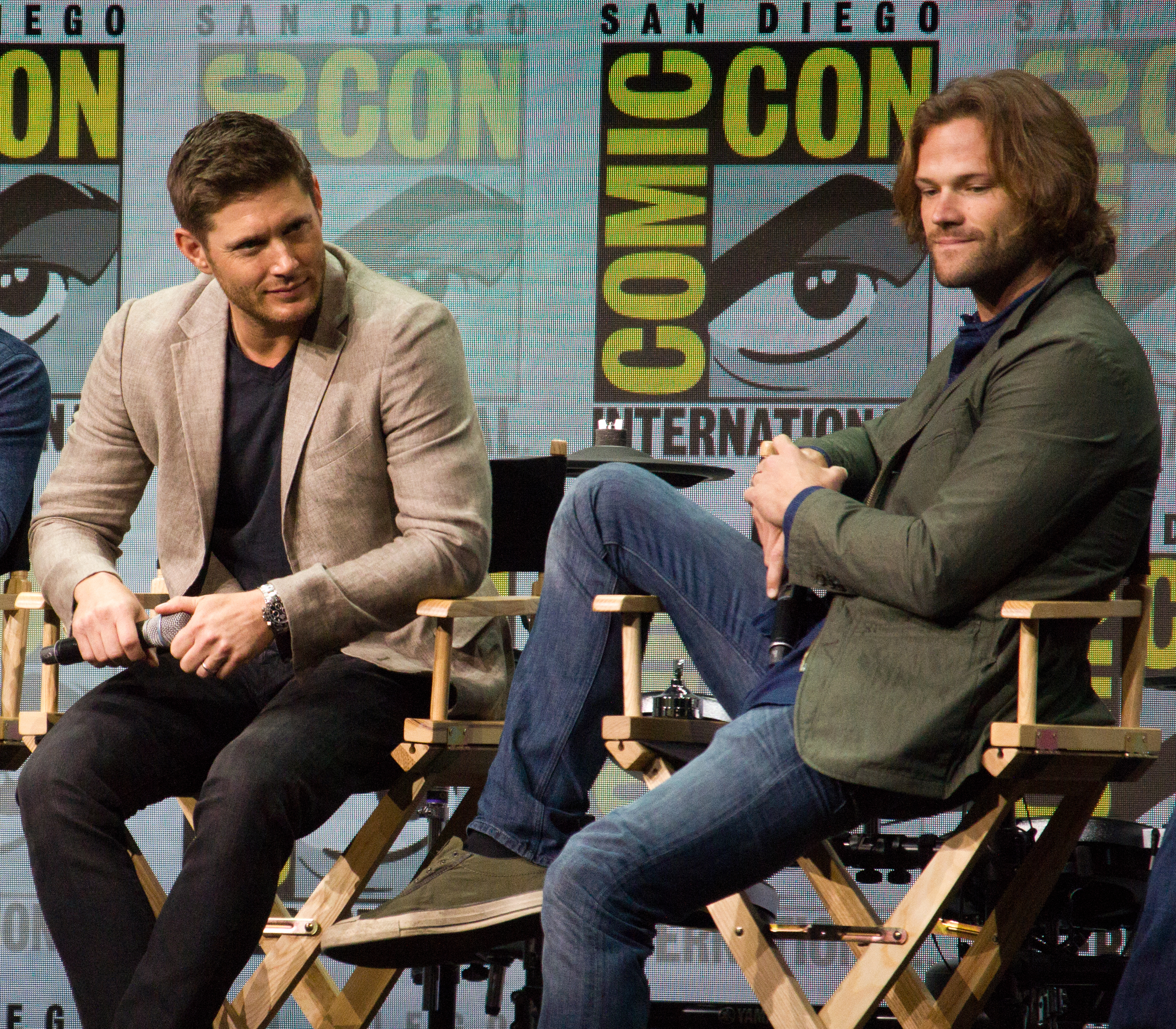
Jensen Ackles (Dean, left) and Jared Padalecki (Sam, right) at a convention panel in 2017

Within the Supernatural fandom, Wincest is the name for the hypothetical romantic pairing, or "ship", between the brothers Sam and Dean Winchester. It is one of the most common pairings on Archive of Our Own and one of the most popular pairings in the fandom. The actors playing the brothers, Jensen Ackles and Jared Padalecki, are also sometimes shipped together. The show itself has referred to Wincest, with an in-universe fictional work about the brothers which has its own Wincest fans that appear on screen, notably in the episodes "The Monster at the End of This Book" and "Fan Fiction".

== Background ==
Supernatural is an American TV series following the brothers Sam (played by Jared Padalecki) and Dean Winchester (played by Jensen Ackles), who hunt supernatural beings. The show, created by Eric Kripke, Bob Singer and Kim Manners began airing in 2005 and ran for 15 seasons until the final episode in 2020.

The show centers on the sibling relationship between the brothers, and showrunner Sera Gamble once referred to the show as "the epic love story of Sam and Dean".

== Fandom ==
Sam: (With a repulsed expression) As in… Sam-slash-Dean. Together.

Dean: Like… together, together?

Sam: Yeah.

Dean: They do know we're brothers, right?

Sam: Doesn't seem to matter.

Dean: Oh, come on. That… That's just sick.

— "The Monster at the End of This Book"

Wincest, the romantic pairing between the brothers Sam and Dean Winchester, is the 6th most common pairing on popular fanfiction site Archive of Our Own as of 2017, and among the most popular pairings in the Supernatural fandom. The word is a portmanteau of Winchester and incest, and was likely influenced by the earlier anime fandom term "wincest" (note the lack of capitalization) that depicts a case of an incestuous relationship the shipper considers to be "win". Wincest fanfiction, like most slash fiction, is primarily written by women.

The first Wincest fanfiction was posted one day after the first episode. Wincest, and the less popular ship between the Winchester brothers' actors, were the most popular ships among the fandom until the introduction of Castiel in the fourth season and the growth of the Dean/Castiel (Destiel) ship. Catherine Tosenberger, a professor at the University of Winnipeg, estimates that, as of 2008, before the introduction of Castiel, Wincest represented a little less than half of Supernatural fanfiction. Destiel gradually overtook Wincest in popularity and is now one of the biggest ships in fandom overall. Fans viewed Destiel as more likely to actually happen in the show since it was not incestuous. Fans of the two pairings are sometimes at odds with one another.

The brothers' isolation from society allows for their relationship to exist separate from societal judgment, and the fandom does not tend to treat incest as particularly transgressive, especially when compared to the characters' other actions within the show. Within fanfiction, writers will often use various folkloric creatures or other supernatural elements to cause the brothers to overcome the incest taboo, such as magic that makes them attracted to each other or causes them to forget that they are related. Some works create supernatural situations in which the brothers must have sex, sometimes referred to as "fuck or die". However, the emphasis is usually not on the taboo, but on the emotional closeness between the two characters.

Tosenberger writes that "Supernatural slash writers' most significant subversion of the text is not that they make things queer, but that they make things happy—a consistent theme of Supernatural slash is that a romance between Sam and Dean will give them a measure of comfort and happiness that they are denied in the series." Flegel and Roth, on the other hand, argue that darker Wincest stories allow fans to explore the unhealthy codependency between the brothers.

== Between the actors ==
The actors playing the brothers, Jensen Ackles and Jared Padalecki, are also often paired together in real person fiction (RPF); this pairing is known as "J2" or "JSquared". As of 2010, over half of the fanfiction written for Supernatural on LiveJournal featured this pairing. Some fans explained this as discomfort with the shipping brothers, as this was before Destiel had significant amounts of time to spread through the fandom, though some J2 fans also wrote Wincest fanfiction. Monica Flegel and Jenny Roth, professors at Lakehead University, attribute some of J2's popularity within the fandom to the different tropes it allows fans to play with. J2 fanfiction is often less dark than the show or Wincest fanfiction, and allows the authors to write about characters that are not isolated from society. The show also lacks significant female characters, and writing about the actors allows fans to incorporate more women in their stories.

Ackles, commenting on the fandom shipping him and Padalecki, has said that "We play brothers on screen, but we're kinda brothers off screen as well. It's a brotherly love that he and I have and it's kind of disappointing to me that people would mistake that for a sexual kind of love." Some fans, referred to as "tinhats", believed that there was actually a real-life relationship between the two actors.

== In the show ==
Dean: Why are they standing so close together?

Marie: Reasons.

Dean: You know they're brothers, right.

Marie: Well, duh. But subtext.

— "Fan Fiction", season 10 episode 5

Within the show, there is a fictional book series "Supernatural", introduced in the episode "The Monster at the End of This Book", that loosely follows the plot of the real-world TV series Supernatural, and the brothers interact with fans of the book on several occasions. One fan, Becky Rosen, is introduced as a Wincest fanfiction writer and runs MoreThanBrothers.net, an in-universe Wincest fan website. A later episode, "Fan Fiction", centers around an in-universe musical based on the books, written by a fan named Marie. The creators use this to comment on the fandom community, and indirectly approve of it. In "Fan Fiction", Dean says to the actors "I know I have expressed some differences of opinion regarding this particular version. But tonight is all about Marie's vision, this is Marie's "Supernatural". So I want you to get out there and I want you to stand as close as she wants you to, and I want you to put as much sub into text as you possibly can."

Beyond explicit references to shipping, fans often cite elements of the show as subtextual evidence for their romantic interpretation. For instance, a character refers to the brothers as "psychotically, irrationally, erotically codependent", and the brothers are occasionally mistaken as a couple within the show. Both brothers have romantic or sexual relationships with women, but they consistently end badly. The brothers do not have any other close relationships, which contributes to the "excessive nature of the brothers' attachment", which some fans say is one of their primary reasons for interpreting the relationship as romantic. Tosenberger quotes one fan as saying that "love that intense tends to read romantic whether it's intentional or not". She argues that their familial relationship allows the brothers to express emotions towards one another than men in their culture would usually not be able to, contributing to the romantic readings of some fans.

== See also ==
- Omegaverse, a genre of erotic fiction with origins in Supernatural fan fiction
