= Mindful Education =

- Steven Universe episode
- From left to right: Connie, Ruby, Steven and Sapphire, during the song "Here Comes a Thought", gazing at butterflies representing their problems and emotional turmoils.
- Episode no.: Season 4 Episode 4
- Directed by: Ki-Yong Bae (animation); Jin-Hee Park (animation); Ricky Cometa (art); Joe Johnston (supervising)
- Written by: Colin Howard; Jeff Liu; Takafumi Hori
- Original air date: August 25, 2016
- Running time: 11 minutes

Guest appearance
- AJ Michalka as Stevonnie

Episode chronology
← Previous "Buddy's Book"	Next → "Future Boy Zoltron"

"Mindful Education" is the fourth episode of the fourth season of the American animated television series Steven Universe, which premiered on August 25, 2016 on Cartoon Network. The episode was written and storyboarded by Colin Howard, Jeff Liu, and by Takafumi Hori. The episode was watched by 1.334 million viewers.

The episode focuses on Steven and Connie training as their fusion, Stevonnie. However, when their respective personal problems interfere with the stability of the fusion, Garnet, a permanent fusion herself, steps in to help them.

== Plot ==
The episode opens with Connie (Grace Rolek) arriving at Steven (Zach Callison)'s house for training, distracted and in a bad mood. Steven and Connie go to the Sky Arena to practice fighting while fused as Stevonnie (AJ Michalka), under the supervision of Pearl (Deedee Magno Hall) and Garnet (Estelle).

Stevonnie's first practice fight is interrupted when a vision of a boy causes them to panic and defuse. Connie confesses that the boy is a classmate she accidentally beat up after bumping into him at school. Steven tells her that when you hurt someone by accident you just have to "try not to think about it"; but Garnet decides to educate them on healthier ways of dealing with difficult emotions.

On the beachside, Garnet tells the two that an emotional imbalance causes a fusion to lose touch with reality; if one of them is falling apart, their fusion will as well. She leads Stevonnie in a guided meditation, singing the song "Here Comes a Thought". The song encourages Stevonnie to mindfully pay attention to and contextualize their emotions: "Take a moment to think of just flexibility, love, and trust." The process of dealing with emotions is visualized by scenes of Ruby and Sapphire, and then Connie and Steven, being overwhelmed by swarms of butterflies, but helping each other to drive them off or accept them.

The next day, Connie returns for training, having made amends with the boy she beat up. Stevonnie performs well in practice battles until they again begin to have visions driven by guilt and anxiety. This time, the guilt is Steven's; they see images of Bismuth, Jasper, and Eyeball, three recent adversaries with whom Steven, despite his best efforts, was unable to make peace. The cloud of butterflies then takes the shape of a stern and disapproving-looking Rose Quartz. Overwhelmed, Stevonnie falls from the Sky Arena.

As they fall, Steven and Connie split again. Connie calls for Steven to fuse so they can float to the ground, but Steven is too wrapped up in guilt to pay attention. Connie tells Steven that he has to be honest with himself about how bad he feels in order for him to move on. Accepting this, Steven fuses with Connie once again and Stevonnie regains stability, managing to safely float down. Stevonnie falls to the ground laughing in relief, and contentedly proclaims, "I'm here".

== Production ==
Promotional art for the episode by storyboarder Jeff Liu

Episodes of Steven Universe are written and storyboarded by a single team. "Mindful Education" was written by Colin Howard, Jeff Liu, and guest animator Takafumi Hori of Studio Trigger. Ki-Yong Bae and Jin-Hee Park provided animation direction, and Ricky Cometa served as art director.

=== Music ===
The episode features the song "Here Comes a Thought". The song was written by series creator Rebecca Sugar, and arranged by Aivi & Surasshu, the music team for the series, with strings performed by Jeff Ball. It features vocals by Estelle as Garnet and AJ Michalka as Stevonnie. A shortened version of the song was first performed by Sugar at the 2016 San Diego Comic-Con, where she described it as a song she wrote to talk herself off of a proverbial ledge. At the 2017 San Diego Comic-Con, AJ Michalka and Estelle, alongside Rebecca Sugar, sang a live acoustic version of the song.

== Broadcast and reception ==
"Mindful Education" premiered on Cartoon Network on August 25, 2016. Its initial American broadcast was viewed by approximately 1.334 million viewers. It received a Nielsen household rating of 0.3, meaning that it was seen by 0.3% of all households.

The episode was highly praised by critics. The animation, Hori's storyboarding and voice acting of the "Here Comes a Thought" sequence was particularly lauded, with James Whitbrook of io9 calling it "one of Steven Universe's best songs since 'Stronger Than You'", and Eric Thurm of The A.V. Club, who gave the episode an A grade, singling out AJ Michalka as "the real MVP of the song". The message of the episode was also praised, with Vrai Kaiser of The Mary Sue comparing it to Pixar's Inside Out, and ND Medina of iDigitalTimes calling it a "bite-sized dose" of cognitive behavioral therapy.
