= Conformity Gate =

Fan theory

Conformity Gate (Note: a.k.a. ConformityGate, Conformitygate, or conformity gate; it can also be hashtagged) is a fan theory devised around "Chapter Eight: The Rightside Up", the series finale of the Netflix television series Stranger Things. Fans online speculated that much of the episode's events, or possibly a greater portion of the fifth and final season, were an illusion created by Vecna, the main antagonist, through his paranormal powers. They thought that an additional episode would release on January 7, 2026.

Following the release of the season's second volume, concerns over alleged cut content spurred Cutgate, a large-scale online campaign. Once the finale aired, it evolved into Conformity Gate and went viral on social media. Proponents of this theory argued that both narrative and external aspects of the finale, and by extension the rest of the season, were evidence; but ultimately no new episode released on the date. The influx of Netflix users were tied to the streaming service crashing that day. A portion moved their anticipation to the release date of the season's behind-the-scenes, to no avail.

Conformity Gate sparked dialogue around fandom mentality and the fifth season more broadly, with some publications viewing it as a conspiracy theory. Several cast and crew members of Stranger Things have weighed in, many of them starring in new productions, discussing fan fixation and the emotions surrounding the theory. Through cultural impact, it boosted prominence for fan activity such as shipping, while also generating opinions from journalistic sites. The theory netted new attention months later in light of Stranger Things Day, a celebration each November 6.

== Background ==
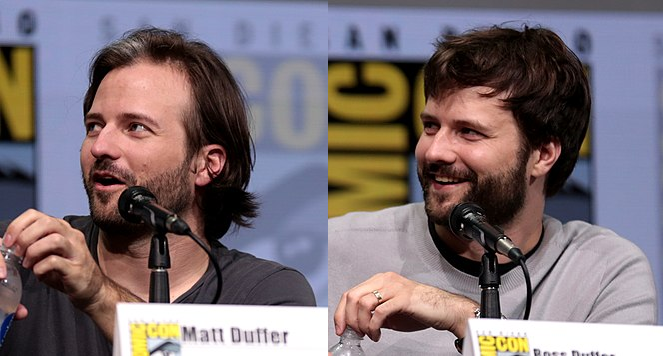
The Duffer Brothers (Matt on the left, Ross on the right), the creators and showrunners of Stranger Things

Stranger Things, created by the Duffer Brothers for the streaming service Netflix, is a "sci-fi inflected coming-of-age tale" with horror elements. It released its fifth and final season in two volumes throughout late 2025, succeeded by the finale, "Chapter Eight: The Rightside Up", on December 31. One of the protagonists, a girl called Eleven harboring psychic abilities, seemingly dies in the collapsing Upside Down after the team of heroes kill Vecna. However, her boyfriend Mike Wheeler later theorizes that she might still be alive and in hiding. Will Byers, Mike's best friend, is a boy who fell in love with him. The fandom ship between them (Byler) was popular for years, alongside the belief that Will's feelings would be reciprocated. Will came out as gay in the fifth season and did not pursue romance with him; queer fans criticized how this represented queer themes. Eleven's ultimate fate was intentionally ambiguous, and it also gave the finale a divisive reception.

After the release of the season's second volume on December 25, 2025, concerns over the quality of and possible narrative gaps in the episodes incited a movement named Cutgate, theorizing that much content had been cut. A Change.org petition calling for the release of "unseen footage" raised nearly 400,000 signatures. On Google Docs, a broadly circulated document listed scenes that fans thought only made sense if something was cut. Some of the allegations were based on false rumored runtimes for episodes in the second volume; a substantial amount of them were based on Will's coming out scene and Byler. Randy Havens, the actor who portrayed Mr. Clarke, debunked Cutgate on Instagram, saying, "There's no secret Snyder Cut of the show. Please don't believe everything some random ass tells you on the Internet." In an interview with Variety, Matt Duffer denied Netflix's accused interference with the story. Eventually, Cutgate served as a foundation for Conformity Gate.

== Formation, shutdown, and behind-the-scenes ==
Though most of the people speaking about Conformitygate are queer and do ship Byler, this theory is less about Byler and more toward the show as a whole.

— Cas, theorist who realized the Possessiongate theory and one of the four creators of Conformity Gate

An X (formerly Twitter) user named Jess spawned the theory, via hosting an audio livestream with three other theorists on the site. They derived the term from the ‑gate suffix. These fans created theories baring ‑gate following the second volume's release, since the Stranger Things fandom appropriated the suffix (originally regarding the Watergate scandal) as fandom slang. The Conformity in the name stems from the conformism fans saw in the ending. After the release of the finale, the theory cut into the mainstream via social media, specifically X, Reddit, and TikTok. The theory that the finale's events were an illusion by Vecna spread particularly rapidly on the last of those sites, inciting over 13,200 (Note: On January 7, under its hashtag, as reported by Inverse. BBC Bitesize stated there were 52,000 posts under it by January 12.) posts there. The date and time of 8 p.m. Eastern Standard Time, (Note: Some sources use the less detailed descriptor of Eastern Time, yet an article by Forbes's staff details Eastern Standard Time (EST). Fans chose the timing to mirror the release time of the fifth season's three segments.) January 7, 2026 was soon determined for the release of a secret and "real" final episode.

A line chart of user reports to Downdetector over Netflix's mass technical outage on January 7

Some fans warned each other to not feel dismayed if nothing would happen. Netflix faced a brief outage when a surge of users on January 7 checked for the theorized episode. Slightly before 8 p.m., over 1,200 reports were submitted to the website tracker Downdetector. Ultimately, no such episode materialized. Netflix and the Duffers did not directly address the theory, though the former updated the biography line of its Stranger Things social media accounts to state that "All episodes of Stranger Things are now playing". (Note: The original was in all caps for emphasis.)

Havens went to Threads to write, "Yes it's the actual finale I'm sorry to all the conspiracy theorists". Linnea Berthelsen, who played Kali Prasad, said that she only saw the theory in passing due to not being online often, and that the Duffers and Millie Bobby Brown, who portrays Eleven, should be the ones to answer. Some proponents moved the predicted date to January 12, 2026, the day when the behind-the-scenes, One Last Adventure: The Making of Stranger Things 5, would be released. To no avail, they thought the secret episode would appear in its place. Martina Radwan, the documentarian behind One Last Adventure, told Newsbeat that she thought Conformity Gate was bizarre, asking, "Why would [the Duffer Brothers] withhold that?" In another interview, she said that she could not speak for the Duffers, but denied the theory anyway and wondered if it was wishful thinking.

Former proponents of Conformity Gate, disillusioned by this later release, aired many grievances on social media. Parade's Liz Declan wrote that while the documentary led to a "new wave" of backlash, "it also likely means the end of this long-running string of theories, which began with Cutgate and (presumably) has ended with Conformity Gate." Among these grievances were a new theory dubbed Divorce Gate, which speculated that Leigh Janiak, Ross Duffer's ex-wife, had ghostwritten parts of the first four seasons. Fans suspected ChatGPT use in the writing process as well, which Radwan denied.

== Compiled evidence ==
On December 25, 2025, Netflix released a teaser clip with the caption "Your Future is on its way. #WhatNext Jan 7, 2026". Fans interpreted it as a hint for a ninth episode's release; it instead promoted an update to user experiences on the Netflix site. The Duffer Brothers teased a "dark Christmas", which fans linked to Orthodox Christmas (observed on January 7). This aligned with the fifth season's tendency to drop episodes on major holidays. The number seven is significant because Will rolled a die landing on a seven, in the show's first episode, to foreshadow capture by a Demogorgon. The roll and the outcome of seven are mirrored in the finale's end credits. The series used the number other times throughout the fifth season.

The theory arose from Vecna's abilities to control characters' minds and make them hallucinate. Vecna would have broken the fourth wall by manipulating what viewers saw, before a reveal that would have effectively undone existing moments like his death. As The Today Show's Scott Stump said, it "represented a frictionless, conformist ending" that was not "breaking with the norm and defying external expectations." Fans also suggested that Vecna conjured this illusion immediately after a climactic altercation with Will in "Chapter Four: Sorcerer", starting to control the former as "the villain's previously teased traitor-spy".

Fans pointed to numerous continuity errors, background elements, and Easter eggs across the episodes. These included a series of cassette tapes that seemingly spelt "U did not stop me" in Morse code, and the phrase "X a lie" formed by reading the letters across each of the main cast's Dungeons & Dragons binders. (Note: The binders in the finale actually spell "Xaile" together, which debunks this. The Guardian and Entertainment Weekly say the image containing "X a lie" was faked, whereas The Direct attributes it to a series of photos on set from IMDb on Instagram.) Will mentions drinking milkshakes at Melvald's, an in-universe town store that was a diner when Vecna was a child. Several extras at the main cast's graduation ostensibly share Vecna's posture, and the graduation robes are orange instead of the green written in the canon novel Stranger Things: One Way or Another. Vickie, college-bound Robin Buckley's girlfriend, is absent from the epilogue—possibly because Vecna did not know her well enough to place her in an illusion. However, it is more likely that they simply broke up.

== Cast and crew response ==
Matthew Modine engages with Instagram comments about the finale. Profile pictures are removed for copyright reasons.

During the weeks and months since the finale's release, cast and crew members of Stranger Things shared their opinions on Conformity Gate. In one such instance, Matthew Modine, who portrayed Martin Brenner (a.k.a. "Papa"), expressed his dislike for the episode on Instagram. Then, he replied to a comment about the theory with "Hoping so for the fans".

=== Promotion for starring roles ===
The theory was referenced in Finn Wolfhard's hosting debut on Saturday Night Live on January 17, 2026, which featured surprise appearances of his fellow series co-stars Caleb McLaughlin and Gaten Matarazzo and showcased a series of imagined Stranger Things spinoffs. All three also respectively reprised their roles as Stranger Things's Mike, Lucas Sinclair, and Dustin Henderson. In a final skit set in Iceland (more specifically where Eleven is believed to be alive), Kenan Thompson assumes her role, and Mike resounds the theory's sentiment.

When asked about it in a later interview with The Hollywood Reporter while promoting his starring role in Goat (2026), McLaughlin said, "I think people missed the concept of what the show is when they were like, 'Oh, there's going to be more'", explaining that such hopes come from Mike's imagination. When the outlet interviewed Matarazzo for starring in Pizza Movie (2026), he recalled walking in New York City when a fan stopped him to ask 'Is it coming out tonight?' and explained that she cancelled her date in favor of the theory. He urged her to return to it, and felt bad about having to deny the release. On an AP News clip for his next starring role in Cold Storage (2026), Joe Keery, who played Steve Harrington, joked that the release would be interesting. While his co-star Georgina Campbell sympathized with fans as they were emotionally attached to and grew up with Stranger Things, Keery said, "Let it go."

=== Further events ===
In May, during an Emmys For Your Consideration event in Los Angeles, one of the series executive producers, Shawn Levy, joined a few of the show's cast members to discuss the finale. Levy ruminated on heartbroken fans who believed in the theory. Noah Schnapp, who played Will, said fans spammed his texts to ask if a secret finale would air. Jamie Campbell Bower, who played Vecna, said "that was fucking crazy" about Conformity Gate speculation from his appearance on The Tonight Show Starring Jimmy Fallon.

Millie Bobby Brown and Jimmy Fallon agreed that the theory was unneeded since the finale was high-quality. In July, during an event on the sidelines of the 2026 San Diego Comic-Con, Bower was interviewed about Conformity Gate by Entertainment Weekly; he stated, "Anything that we did was like, 'Well, that just proves it,'" and also said that fans would still ask him about the theory.

== Impact ==
After going viral, multiple commentaries described Conformity Gate as a conspiracy theory. (Note: Attributed to multiple sources:) CBC Kids News's Kit Hornby said the theory doubles as a means to mourn the show's conclusion; she suggested fan fiction as a better way to channel such passion. The theory was also associated with a broader criticism for the writing and narrative direction of the fifth season. Eleven's fate was one of the more controversial aspects of the finale, and some fans opined that the ending was "so bad" it could not be real. AI-generated videos of Mike Wheeler and her reuniting in Iceland gained traction on TikTok. Some fans of Byler were unhappy with the pair's final outcome, turning to Conformity Gate in hopes of being validated by the series.

The first of many popular, unofficial Facebook accounts latching on Conformity Gate, an image from Netflix Updates promoted it and attracted over 10,000 comments, notably humorous perspectives from the theory's nonbelievers. One wrote, "Vecna's wife wakes up and finds him in the shower and realizes it was all a dream", referencing Bobby Ewing's outcome in the 1980s series Dallas. Daniel Radcliffe, who played Harry Potter in the film series of the same name, praised the finale and said he "feels tired" on behalf of the Duffers debunking rumors; he also joked that there would be a Harry Potter sequel in the same vein. Vulture's Bethy Squires compared the theory to The Johnlock Conspiracy, another theory in which fans of the Sherlock series believed that in another finale, the queer ship Johnlock would be realized.

== November 2026 traction ==
Conformity Gate was revitalized ahead of Stranger Things Day, an annual commemoration on November 6 to mark when Will vanished on the show's first episode. On Instagram, Ross Duffer teased a revelation under a meme format inspired by Nathan Fielder's You Can See Everything (2026), after a period of low site activity. A few days earlier, Finn Wolfhard and Caleb McLaughin allegedly filmed something while wearing clothes from the show. The US game show Wheel of Fortune also shared the message "Stranger things have happened", and the Weather Channel posted a Stranger Things–themed video on TikTok about a weather phenomenon where the sky turns red from a cyclone. Fans saw the different references as hints for the theory. On November 6, a Stranger Things spinoff named Other Worlds: A Stranger Things Adventure was announced.

== See also ==
- List of -gate scandals and controversies
- Johnlock – fandom ship that drove a similar theory
