= Stevonnie =

- Steven Universe character
- Stevonnie as they appear in "Mindful Education"
- First appearance: "Alone Together" (2015)
- Last appearance: "Bismuth Casual" (2020)
- Created by: Rebecca Sugar
- Voiced by: AJ Michalka

In-universe information
- Species: 25% Gem; 75% Human
- Gender: Non-binary
- Affiliation: Crystal Gems
- Weapon: Sword; Shield
- Nationality: American

Stevonnie (/stəˈvɒni/ stə-VON-ee) is a fictional character in the animated series Steven Universe and Steven Universe Future, created by Rebecca Sugar. A "fusion" of the protagonist Steven Universe and his friend Connie Maheswaran, Stevonnie has the appearance of an androgynous young adult. First introduced in the episode "Alone Together", Stevonnie only appears occasionally in the series and once in the limited epilogue series, Steven Universe Future.

== Character ==
One of the core concepts in Steven Universe is a process referred to as "fusion", in which two or more Gem characters merge into one being who is physically larger and stronger. Fusion is used by the writers of the show as a metaphor for a range of types of intimacy and relationships. The episode "Alone Together", first broadcast January 15, 2015, focuses on protagonist Steven's first experience with fusion while dancing with his friend Connie.

Steven and Connie identify as male and female respectively (although some have interpreted Steven as genderfluid), but Stevonnie's gender is difficult to describe. Steven Universe's creator, Rebecca Sugar, has responded to an inquiry on Stevonnie's gender—whether Stevonnie is agender, bigender, or something else—by stating that "Stevonnie is an experience! The living relationship between Steven and Connie." Sugar described Stevonnie as a complex and specific metaphor that becomes relatable as it takes shape in the form of a unique character. Besides challenging gender norms, as Sugar put it, Stevonnie serves as a metaphor for "terrifying firsts in a first relationship", the feeling of hitting puberty, and objectification. This was also reflected by Ian Jones Quartey, who also called Stevonnie an experience.

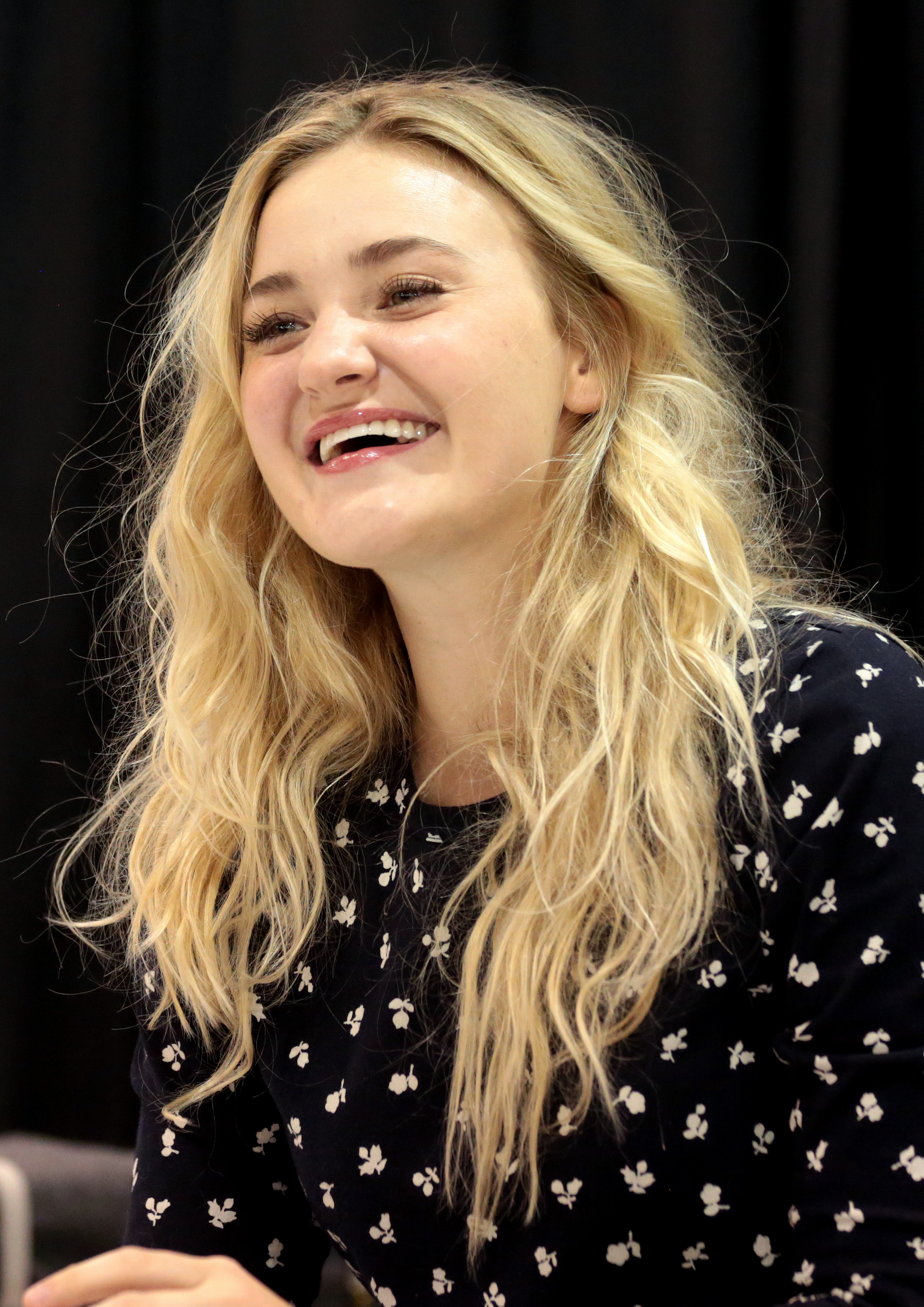
Stevonnie is voiced by actor and musician AJ Michalka.

Stevonnie is referred to using they/them pronouns, and both male and female characters seem to be physically attracted to Stevonnie. In a 2019 public service announcement about self-esteem and social media sponsored by Dove, Stevonnie shows an Instagram profile describing them as intersex and non-binary.

== Appearances ==
Stevonnie appeared only occasionally in episodes of Steven Universe. In "Alone Together", Steven and Connie fuse for the first time, and Stevonnie enjoys the capabilities of their new body before having an anxiety attack at a party and fending off unwelcome advances from Kevin, an arrogant teenager. Other episodes in which Stevonnie plays a starring role include the third-season episode "Beach City Drift", in which they challenge Kevin to a car race; the fourth-season episode "Mindful Education", in which Garnet teaches them mindfulness meditation to deal with difficult emotions; and the fifth season's "Jungle Moon", in which they are stranded on an alien planet. They also appear in two episodes at the end of the show's fifth season.

In a March 2017 comic (written by Melanie Gillman and drawn by Katy Farina and Whitney Cogar), Stevonnie goes with supporting character Kiki Pizza to her school prom. At the dance, Stevonnie has another anxiety attack, after which Steven and Connie discuss whether they are lying to Kiki about their identity.

Additionally, Stevonnie is a playable character in the Steven Universe: Save the Light game, in the Brawlhalla game, where they were a crossover character, and appeared in an episode of Steven Universe Future, "Bismuth Casual". Stevonnie also appeared in a 2020 comic designed by Cartoon Network and the National Black Justice Coalition which highlighted "the power and importance of respecting gender identity through the use of gender pronouns".

== Impact ==
Meredith Woerner of io9 described Stevonnie as a "big game changer character" for Steven Universe, who got a strong reaction from fans of the series. Writing for Towleroad.com, Charles Pulliam-Moore stated that Stevonnie deepened the way that watchers understood some of Steven Universe's core characters. Carli Velocci, writing for Polygon commented that Stevonnie is a positive metaphor for consent, in an entirely non-sexual context. Greta Christina of AlterNet noted that Steven and Connie continued to check in with one another during the first experience as Stevonnie, which she described as "an amazing example of ongoing, active consent". Vrai Kaiser of The Mary Sue said of the character that "there are few things more refreshing than seeing children's media acknowledge that feeling negative emotions is a part of life. Taking a tack not dissimilar to Inside Out, the show uses visual metaphor to deal with complex, intangible emotions."

Steven Universe has a significant amount of LGBT representation as well, featuring multiple feminine characters that show romantic attraction directed to each other. Stevonnie's appearance, and Steven Universe in general, have been part of a trend toward greater LGBTQ visibility in animated television series since 2010. As a genderqueer character, Stevonnie follows this same movement, and has encouraged people to be more open about their gender.

In an August 5, 2020, interview with Paper Magazine, Sugar explained that her goal was to create a "great" nonbinary character whose existence is not a joke and who the audience is excited to see. She noted that, since the show is from Steven's point of view, Stevonnie becomes the main character whenever Stevonnie exists. Therefore, the viewer gets to "experience the point of view of a nonbinary character who is the main character of the show", asking viewers to put themselves "in this person's shoes" whether enjoying life, going on adventures, or the like, but also when they are being harassed or "experiencing panic".
