= Alone Together (Steven Universe) =

- Steven Universe episode
- Stevonnie realizes their existence.
- Episode no.: Season 1 Episode 37
- Directed by: Ki-Yong Bae (animation); Sue-Hong Kim (animation); Elle Michalka (art); Ian Jones-Quartey (supervising)
- Written by: Hilary Florido; Katie Mitroff; Rebecca Sugar
- Production code: 1026-034
- Original air date: January 15, 2015
- Running time: 11 minutes

Guest appearances
- Andrew Kishino as Kevin; AJ Michalka as Stevonnie

Episode chronology
| ← Previous "Lion 3: Straight to Video" | Next → "Warp Tour" |

"Alone Together" is the 37th episode of the first season of the American animated television series Steven Universe. It first aired on January 15, 2015, on Cartoon Network. The episode was written and storyboarded by Hilary Florido, Katie Mitroff, and series creator Rebecca Sugar.

In the episode, Steven, frustrated that he cannot fuse like the other Crystal Gems, unexpectedly fuses with his best friend Connie, marking the first appearance of their fusion Stevonnie.

== Plot ==
As the episode begins, the Crystal Gems are trying to teach Steven (Zach Callison) to dance, hoping he will develop the power of fusion—the ability of Gems to merge their minds and bodies to form more powerful individuals. Steven has difficulty mastering the dance steps, and Pearl (Deedee Magno Hall) is unsure whether fusion is even possible for him, though Amethyst (Michaela Dietz) and Garnet (Estelle) have more confidence.

Later, Steven discusses his difficulties with Connie (Grace Rolek). She tells him she admires him for even trying, saying she's usually too nervous to dance in front of other people. Steven invites her to dance with him on the beach. As they dance, Steven's gem begins to glow, and he and Connie inadvertently fuse into a single individual—a tall, androgynous, beautiful teenager (voiced by AJ Michalka).

They show the Gems their fused form—dubbed “Stevonnie” by Amethyst. Pearl is perturbed by the unprecedented fusion of a Gem with a human, but Garnet is thrilled, and advises Stevonnie to “go have fun!”

Stevonnie revels in the capabilities of their fused body, running and diving on the beach. When they stop for a snack at The Big Donut, the employees Lars and Sadie (Matthew Moy and Kate Micucci) are flustered and amazed by their beauty. Steven and Connie, through Stevonnie's voice, briefly check in with each other to ensure that they are comfortable remaining fused. Steven's friend Sour Cream (Brian Posehn) meets Stevonnie, and invites them to a rave he's DJing later that night.

At the rave, Stevonnie's graceful and athletic moves on the dance floor draw everyone's attention and admiration. Stevonnie, feeling anxious at being the center of attention and the only person dancing, begins to experience a panic attack, visualizing their anxiety as a disco ball closing in around them. They are interrupted by Kevin (Andrew Kishino), an arrogant teenager who wants them to dance with them. Stevonnie flees the dance floor, feeling isolated.

Kevin follows them, invading Stevonnie's personal space and refusing to take no for an answer. Eventually, disgusted, they agree to dance with him. Stevonnie's violent and angry dance moves confuse and disconcert Kevin, and soon Stevonnie falls apart and unfuses. Kevin panics and leaves. Steven and Connie laugh with nervous relief, and Sour Cream showers them with glowsticks as they run about on the dance floor.

== Production ==
Episodes of Steven Universe are written and storyboarded by a single team. "Alone Together" was written by Hilary Florido, Katie Mitroff, and Rebecca Sugar. One of Rebecca Sugar's goals in writing the episode was to create a metaphor illustrating the importance of consent in relationships; Kevin's role is to demonstrate how uncomfortable it is to have one's boundaries disrespected.

The episode was directed by supervising director Ian Jones-Quartey, animation directors Ki-Yong Bae and Sue-Hong Kim, and art director Elle Michalka. According to Elle Michalka, Steven's hometown of Beach City is usually drawn in a more realistic style than other locations; however, in "Alone Together", a bokeh effect is introduced to emulate the style of shōjo manga and make Beach City appear simultaneously magical, kitschy, and familiar.

== Broadcast and reception ==
The episode had its television premiere on Cartoon Network on January 15, 2015. Its initial American broadcast was viewed by approximately 1.67 million viewers.

Several commentators have lauded the episode's portrayal of the importance of consent. For example, Greta Christina, writing for AlterNet, praises how the narrative portrays Steven and Connie checking in on each other's willingness to continue the fusion. Carli Velocci, at Polygon, notes that the episode demonstrates that a narrative about the importance of consent need not include sexual content, highlighting both Steven and Connie's relationship as a positive model of consent and Kevin as portraying the threatening nature of coercive behavior.

J.P. Brammer, at Vulture.com, notes that the episode is an example of the show's commitment to “queer joy”, in which a genderqueer character can be celebrated; the scene in which Stevonnie introduces themself to the other Gems is analogized to a “coming-out moment”. Academic writers have also noted that a function of this episode is to represent non-binary gender and explore its role in the world of Steven Universe.
