= Queer coding =

Implicit representation of LGBTQ characters

Queer coding (also written without a space: queercoding) is the attribution of stereotypically queer traits to fictional characters without explicitly stating their gender and sexual identity.

Queer coding may have had a negative impact on perceptions of queerness in media as villains in fictional stories are often queer-coded.

Queer coding is a concept both in the discussion of media portrayal of LGBTQ people and academic research involving queer theory or gender studies.

== History ==
In 1930, the Hays Code was established in the United States, which regulated the content of films and prohibited the portrayal of homosexuality.

In animation, cartoon artists were able to portray the gender of characters in androgynous, asexual, and gender-fluid ways. Paul Wells and Patrick Brion argue that Jerry from the Tom & Jerry cartoons to have an androgynous and even feminine design. The 1966 short "Jerry-Go-Round" has been interpreted by Jo Johnson as containing a coded lesbian relationship between Jerry and a female elephant, even though Jerry is male. Cade M. Olmstead, a philosopher, has argued that Tom and Jerry "subverts normalized gender and sexuality structures" through theatrical play and performance, transgressing the normal construction of gender. "Queer coding" has also been observed in the Bugs Bunny cartoons.

In the late 1980s, villains in Disney films which were "queer coded" began to appear. Commentary on the treatment of LGBT+ characters in film is made in the 1995 documentary The Celluloid Closet, and is one of the first instances in which the idea of queer coding is presented to the public.

Until the 1970s, gay characters generally did not appear on American television.

=== Villains ===
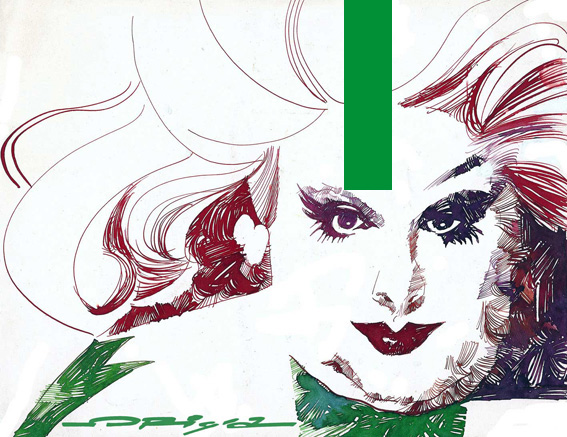
Ursula's character design in The Little Mermaid was inspired by the drag queen Divine.

Because of the Hays Code, positive portrayals of homosexual characters were barred, and the only characters in fiction that could be perceived as homosexuals had evil roles and were punished throughout the work. Thus, villains became noted in particular to have effeminate characteristics, behaviors or gestures that could be perceived as LGBTQ. Disney characters have attracted attention because their films are popular among children. Examples include:

- Governor Ratcliffe in Pocahontas, who is the only male character with makeup, braided hair and bows, and wears pink
- Ursula in The Little Mermaid was inspired by the drag queen Divine
- Captain Hook in Peter Pan
- King Candy in Wreck-It Ralph
- Hades in Hercules
- Shere Khan and Kaa in The Jungle Book
- Gaston and LeFou in Beauty and the Beast
- Scar in The Lion King
- Dr. Facilier in The Princess and the Frog
- Jafar in Aladdin
- Hector Barbossa in the Pirates of the Caribbean franchise
- The Cheshire Cat in Alice in Wonderland, as an anti-hero

While many examples can be pulled from Disney, the trend of queer coding villains in prominent media and film extends beyond the corporation. Some examples include:

- The devil character HIM in The Powerpuff Girls, who dresses in a tutu and heels.
- Comic-relief Team Rocket grunts Jessie and James of the Pokémon franchise, who frequently crossdress as a disguise.
- The lethal duo of Billy Loomis and Stu Macher in Scream, who are based on murderers Nathan Freudenthal Leopold Jr. and Richard Albert Loeb according to the screenwriter, Kevin Williamson. Williamson has described the movies overall as being "coded in gay survival".
- The androgynous Overwatch hero Moira, who is an agent of the terrorist organisation Talon.
- Larry 3000 in the Cartoon Network program Time Squad, who has been interpreted to be gay.
- King Xerxes of Persia in 300 was intentionally depicted as effeminate to "scare" young heterosexual men in the audience.

== Impact ==
Queer coding may have a negative impact on perceptions of queerness in media; villains are often queer-coded, leading to the pejorative perception of queer traits. Critics have noted the Walt Disney Company's attribution of queer characteristics and behaviors to villainous or antagonistic characters.

Gaston and LeFou in the 1991 film Beauty and the Beast and Jafar from the 1992 film Aladdin were created by openly gay animator Andreas Deja, and sang music written by openly gay lyricist Howard Ashman. The fact that Deja had also worked on Scar in The Lion King and the titular protagonist of Hercules, for example, has been discussed as an influence on the development of some Disney characters.

Queer coding has led to some networks not wanting to show overt representation. Animator Rebecca Sugar argued that it is "really heavy" for a kid to only exist "as a villain or a joke" in an animated series. Critics regarded such queer-coded villains as contributing to "homophobic discourse" and equating queerness with evil itself. Other critics have said that this attribution can lead to a negative association between queerness and immoral, licentious behavior. In 2011, Deja told news.com.au that Disney would have a "family that has two dads or two mums" if they find the "right kind of story with that kind of concept."

In February 2021, producer Ralph Farquhar said that in The Proud Family, which aired on the Disney Channel from 2001 to 2005, they had to use "code to talk about if Michael was gay, to talk about sexuality" and to be "sort of underhanded about it." He said this changed with The Proud Family: Louder and Prouder with the biggest changes to the show are "gender identity, obviously racial identity and quote-unquote wokeness," and said that sexuality can be "sort of in your face with it a lot more," manifesting itself in the storytelling.

== See also ==
- Media portrayal of LGBTQ people
- He never married
- Single women in the Middle Ages
- LGBTQ themes in Western animation
- LGBTQ themes in anime and manga
- Queerbaiting
