= Anne Jamison (academic) =

Professor of English and fandom scholar

Anne Elizabeth Jamison is an American professor of English at University of Utah noted primarily for her work on fan fiction.

Jamison grew up in Albany, New York. She received a BA from Barnard College, an MA from the University of London and a PhD from Princeton University. She moved to Salt Lake City in 2004 to take a position of Assistant Professor at the University of Utah. She teaches courses in Victorian literature, children's literature, and literary theory. She is a longtime Buffy the Vampire Slayer fan.

Her book Fic: Why Fanfiction is Taking Over The World was published by Penguin Random House in 2013. Jamison has been a noted expert on "fan fiction" since publishing her book Fic. Jamison is also the author of books on poetry and Kafka.
