= List of bisexual characters in animation =

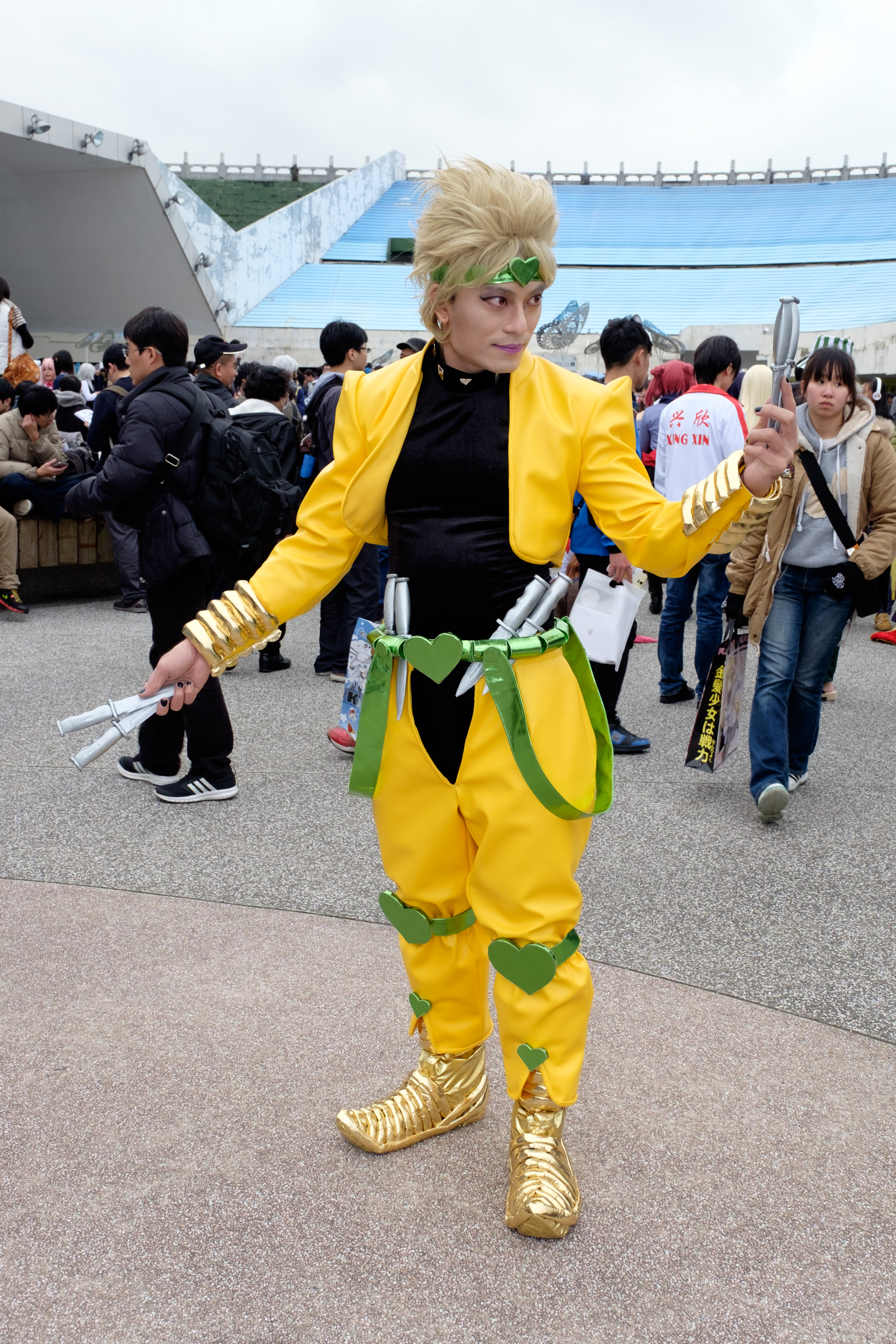
Cosplay of Dio Brando, a bisexual character and the main antagonist of the anime and manga series JoJo's Bizarre Adventure

This is a list of characters in animation that either self-identify as bisexual or have been identified by outside parties to be bisexual. Listed characters are either recurring characters, cameos, guest stars, or one-off characters in animated series, but not animated films. This article also includes characters in Japanese animation, otherwise known as anime. There are also corresponding lists of lesbian, non-binary, and gay animated characters.

For fictional characters in other parts of the LGBTQ community, see the lists of gay, trans, lesbian, non-binary, pansexual, asexual, and intersex characters.

The names are organized alphabetically by surname (i.e. last name), or by a single name if the character does not have a surname. If more than two characters are in one entry, the last name of the first character is used.

== 1960s to 1980s ==
Characters	Show title	Character debut date	Notes	Country
Rosalie Lamorlière	The Rose of Versailles	October 10, 1979	She is the adopted daughter of Nicole Lamorlière, attempting prostitution at one point to get money, as shown in the episode "A Beautiful Devil" and swears to kill her mother's murderer in the episodes "The Secret of the Angel" and "Farewell, My Sister!" She tries to kill Oscar's mother but Oscar stops her and soon takes her as an apprentice, earning Rosalie's admiration and love, as she opens his eyes. She later ends up marrying Oscar's friend, Bernard Chatelet in the episode "A Funeral Bell Tolls in the Twilight".	Japan

== 1990s ==
Characters	Show title	Character debut date	Notes	Country
Liane Cartman	South Park	August 13, 1997	In the early seasons, Liane was very sexually active and regularly pursued this activity. She also had no issue with having sexual relations with strangers, usually inviting them to the home as frequent visitors. This desire was not strictly for men, hinted in the episode, "Cartman's Mom Is Still a Dirty Slut" she had intercourse with Ms. Crabtree, Mayor McDaniels, and Sheila Broflovski.	United States
Meg Griffin	Family Guy	January 31, 1999	Throughout the series, Meg has shown romantic interest in and dated several men. However, there have been several instances, in episodes like "Stew-Roids" and "Dial Meg for Murder" in which she has shown hints of being bisexual or a lesbian. In November 2016, when asked about further development on the characters Chris and Meg, Alec Sulkin confirmed there would be a future episode where Meg comes out as a lesbian, taking inspiration from earlier episodes where she exhibited signs of lesbian characteristics. A few episodes since then have hinted at that possible development, such as "The Griffin Winter Games", "Trump Guy", and "Trans-Fat".	United States
Stewie Griffin	Family Guy	January 31, 1999	Stewie has been in relationships with female babies but is also attracted to males. In the commentary for Stewie Griffin: The Untold Story, the writers describe how they were going to make Stewie discover he was gay but decided to scrap this idea in order to retain Stewie's sexual ambiguity for writing purposes. MacFarlane planned for the series' third season to end with Stewie coming out of the closet after a near-death experience. The show's abrupt cancellation, before later continuing, caused MacFarlane to abort these plans, and the episode "Queer Is Stewie?" was produced, but never shown.	United States
Fukiko "Miya-sama" Ichinomiya	Dear Brother	July 14, 1991	She appears to be calm and generous, even as she dresses conservatively, but is cruel and manipulative, often psychologically and physically torturing Rei for several ambiguous reasons. She desires that Rei only have eyes for her, no one else, as indicated in episodes 5 and 6. She also jealously tries to destroy their relationship by making Nanako love her instead. In the anime, her love for Takehiko is given a backstory: she met and fell in love with him when she was twelve and he spent several days with her in the Ichinomiya mansion, but he unknowingly broke her heart by not showing up to her birthday party.	Japan
Touga Kiryuu	Revolutionary Girl Utena	April 2, 1997	He is in a relationship with Akio Ohtori, with both in bed together, and is a playboy with various "conquests" of women, with Anthy as Touga's girlfriend before Utena came along, as also shown in the movie. In the light novels, Touga is shown to be engaging in sexual activities with Miki, while in the anime it's implied to have happened.	Japan
Nuriko	Fushigi Yûgi	April 20, 1995	Nuriko initially dresses and acts as a woman named Kang-lin, one of Hotohori's concubines because Kang-lin was his twin sister who died and he wanted to keep her memory alive as shown in the episode, "The Seven Stars of Suzaku". He enjoys cross-dressing, as indicates in the episode "Even If I Die.."., and is in love with Hotohori, but later also grows to love the main heroine Miaka as indicated in the episode "Brief Parting".	Japan
Akio Ohtori	Revolutionary Girl Utena	July 2, 1997	He seduces Touga Kiryuu and is a playboy with various sexual female conquests, with Akio's conquests include Utena and Kozue,	Japan
Riki	Ai no Kusabi	August 1, 1992	Riki was once the gang leader of the Bison gang. However he was captured and kept as a pet for three years by Iason who grew obsessively in love with him. She found the characterization of Iason in the third novel to be realistic and compelling, Prior to this, Riki was in a relationship with Guy. He also once engaged in a one-night stand with a female slave named Mimea.	Japan
Stephen Stotch	South Park	May 27, 1998	Despite being married to Linda, Butters' father Stephen Stotch is revealed to be a regular customer at the local gay theater & bathhouse as shown in "Butters' Very Own Episode", and claiming to Linda he only did so out of curiosity, Stephen promises to suppress any future gay urges. However, some episodes, like "Insecurity", show him pursuing these acts in secret.	United States
Amy Wong	Futurama	April 4, 1999	Amy Wong is a Martian woman of Chinese descent and a series protagonist. Although Amy has been in a long-term relationship with Kif Kroker, a male alien, and raising his three surviving children with him; in the episode titled "The Numberland Gap" in thirteenth broadcast season (tenth production season), she inadvertently outs herself as bisexual. This was previously hinted in the 2008 direct-to-video film Futurama: Bender's Game when she, as Gynaecaladrial, kisses Leegola (centaur version of Turanga Leela) in the alternate world of Cornwood. She kisses Professor Farnsworth in the same film. Otherwise, throughout the series, she is depicted attracted to men. She fights with Leela over Philip J. Fry (who she is attracted to), in the episode "The ButterJunk Effect." She also is attracted to robots and had a relationship with Bender Rodriguez, in episodes such as Proposition Infinity, with both sleeping together, which the series describes as "robosexuality".	United States

== 2000s ==
Characters	Show title	Character debut date	Notes	Country
Clio Aquanaut	Tactical Roar	January 7, 2006	She is the player of the crew and is a bisexual, as noted by her voice actress, Rio Natsuki, with many girls after her. She likes to tease and flirt with Hyosuke, as well as anyone else, and is the Weapons Chief.	Japan
Franz d'Épinay	Gankutsuou: The Count of Monte Cristo	October 5, 2004	Franz, a friend of Albert, is engaged to a woman named Valentine for political reasons though he does not love her. He instead heavily implies throughout the series that he has strong feelings for someone else and it is later revealed his feelings are towards his best friend Albert, who is traveling with him. [1] However, he did show some attraction to women and did consider sleeping with a woman in episode 1, "At Journey's End, We Meet".	Japan
Ryoji "Ranka" Fujioka	Ouran High School Host Club	June 10, 2006	Ryoji is Haruhi Fujioka's father who works as a cross-dressing entertainer. In the series, he expresses undying love for his deceased wife, but often brings home male lovers while Haruhi is at school.	Japan
Chizu Hanashiro	Sweet Blue Flowers	July 2, 2009	Fumi's cousin. Chizu and Fumi were very close as children and developed a more physically intimate relationship once they were older. Fumi was in love with Chizu, but Chizu chooses to get married instead, breaking Fumi's heart. Chizu's first child looks a lot like Fumi did as a baby.	Japan
Jōji "George" Koizumi	Paradise Kiss	October 3, 2005	George is a designer at Parakiss. He is bisexual and sees himself as an "equal opportunity lover", including with the protagonist, Yukari "Caroline" Hayasaka as shown in episodes like "Atlier" and "Future", and Isabella previously had a relationship with Joji.	Japan
Terry Kimple	The Cleveland Show	October 18, 2009	Terry, Cleveland's co-worker, marries his husband Paul in one episode, "Terry Unmarried". In the same episode, Cleveland asks if Terry is gay; Terry answers no, much to Cleveland's cheer. But Terry replies he's attracted to both genders, much to Cleveland's dismay.	United States
Tomari Kurusu	Kashimashi: Girl Meets Girl	January 18, 2006	Tomari is Hazumu's childhood friend, so the two know a lot about each other and have many memories from the past. After Hazumu's initial transformation, Tomari does not know what to do. Ayuki observes that Tomari liked Hazumu more as a boy, due to the fact that she has had affections for Hazumu for some time. She ultimately realizes that while Hazumu has changed physically, her personality is still the same, and therefore still the same person inside, resulting in continued romantic attraction.	
Andrew LeGustambos	Sit Down, Shut Up	April 19, 2009	Andrew is a flamboyant and bisexual drama teacher whose last name in Spanish roughly translates to "he likes both", a reference to his sexual orientation. He is in love with Larry Littlejunk and Miracle Grohe, with whom he hopes to get into a relationship should they become a couple.	United States
Ling-Ling	Drawn Together	October 27, 2004	Ling-Ling, an Asian trading-card mini-monster, is identified as bisexual by a parody of The Terminator in the episode "Wooldoor Sockbat's Giggle-Wiggle Funny Tickle Non-Traditional Progressive Multicultural Roundtable!".	United States
Foxxy Love	Drawn Together	October 27, 2004	Foxxy, a "sexy mystery-solver", has relations with both men and women, but preferably with the former. She makes out with Princess Clara in the show's first episode, and has a brief BDSM relationship with Captain Hero in "Requiem for a Reality Show".	United States
Linda Memari	American Dad!	June 12, 2005	Linda is one of the neighbors of the Smith family and is a bisexual Iranian-American woman. Linda saved Francine from the Lady Bugs, a social group for women who cheat on their husbands, by kissing her in the episode "Not Particularly Desperate Housewives". It has been suggested Linda may not be attracted to her husband. In an attempt to hit on Francine, in the episode "Rough Trade", she rearranged her clothes to make her bust more prominent and knocked on the Smiths' door (prompting a drunk Stan to comment "When did you get those?"). After thinking Stan was beating Francine, she made an awkward excuse to leave. Francine then says, "She's a weird chick". Linda's husband is resigned to her preferences, and asks, in a defeated tone, if he can "at least watch this time" when he sees Linda eying Francine.	United States
Pam Poovey	Archer	September 17, 2009	Pam is the bisexual director of human resources. In a behind-the-scenes feature, her voice actor, Amber Nash described Pam as "a sturdy bisexual".	United States
Yukari Sendou	Rosario + Vampire	January 17, 2008	Yukari (a witchling), has a crush on both Moka (a female vampire) and Tsukune (a male human). Yukari openly wants to have a three-way relationship with them, but Moka and Tsukune don't return her feelings. When Yukari is introduced in both the manga and the anime, she only likes Moka, not Tsukune. Once Moka saves Yukari from being bullied by their monster schoolmates, Yukari confesses her love to her in the second episode, "Witchling and Vampire". At this point, Yukari tries to drive Moka and Tsukune apart, out of jealousy. Only after Tsukune puts himself in harm's way to save Yukari from monsters too, Yukari starts to like him as well and confesses her love to him.	Japan
Hatsuharu Sohma	Fruits Basket	September 6, 2001	Hatsuharu is part of the Sohma family, a family cursed into turning into members of the zodiac when under stress or hugged by members of the opposite sex as shown in the "Make It Clear If It's Black or White" episode. He was born in the year of the cow and was often annoyed by people's comments about the stupidity of the cow from the zodiac, and blamed his troubles on Yuki who was born the year of the rat. However, Yuki helps him realize he needs to move past people's comments and enters an on/off relationship with Rin Sohma, who dumped him in Season 2, he refers to Yuki as his first love.	Japan
Coach Daniel Stopframe	Moral Orel	January 30, 2006	Orel's bisexual coach as well as Shapey's biological father, Daniel lusts after their father, Clay, and at one point has sex with three women and a dog in episodes like "The Blessed Union".	United States
Eiri Yuki	Gravitation	October 4, 2000	Shuichi Shindo falls in love with Eiri Yuki beginning in the first episode. Over the course of the series manages to melt the cold heart of Eiri and the two become a couple. In one episode, "Winding Road", it is revealed that Eiri has a fiancée named Ayaka Usami, but she backs away after seeing the love between Shuichi and Eiri.	Japan

== 2010s ==
Characters	Show title	Character debut date	Notes	Country
Maria Akizuki	From the New World	September 29, 2012	She falls in love with and begins to date Saki but later enters a duty pact with and marries Mamoru Itō. As she is one of the main characters, she appears "ambiguously bisexual".	Japan
Shun Aonuma	From the New World	September 29, 2012	He dated Satoru Asahina for a time but was in love with Saki since childhood. However, he stayed away from Saki for fear of his growing uncontrollable power. As he is one of the main characters, he appears "ambiguously bisexual".	Japan
Apollo	Is It Wrong to Try to Pick Up Girls in a Dungeon?	July 31, 2019	Apollo is bisexual as he has many male members of his familia that he loves and also shows sexual desire towards Bell Cranel, a male adventurer. In addition, when he was in heaven he was besotted with the female goddess Hestia, much to her disgust.	Japan
Satoru Asahina	From the New World	September 29, 2012	Satoru dated Shun for a while but the two later broke up and he began to date another boy for a time, but that relationship also failed. He later falls in love with and marries Saki, shown in the episode "From the New World". Since he is one of the main characters, he appears "ambiguously bisexual".	Japan
Princess Bean	Disenchantment	August 17, 2018	Princess Bean has shown attraction to both men and women. In the premiere of the show, Bean was originally arranged to marry Prince Merkimer. In the season 3 episode "Last Splash", she shares a same-sex kiss with the mermaid Mora. Mora is helpful in getting Bean to Steamland. In the previous season, Bean was shown to enjoy "the company of mermaids". Earlier in the series, Elfo, a male elf, was Bean's love interest. Bean is voiced by bisexual actress Abbi Jacobson.	United States
Princess Bubblegum	Adventure Time	April 5, 2010	Bubblegum is in a relationship with Marceline the Vampire Queen, and may have dated a male character, Mr. Cream Puff. Her exact sexuality, unlike Marcy's, has not been confirmed. As such, reviewers have argued she is either bisexual, non-binary, queer, lesbian, or a combination of some of the latter, as both live in a world where "sexuality is somewhat fluid".	United States
Blake Belladonna	RWBY	July 25, 2013	In a conversation with the voice actresses for Ruby Rose (Lindsay Jones), Weiss Schnee (Kana Eberle), Yang (Barbara Dunkelman), and Patty Hawkins, for GalaxyCon, the voice actress for Blake, Arryn Zech, confirmed that Blake likes men and women, with the other cast members concurring with her assessment. She had a previous relationship with her abusive boyfriend, Adam Taurus. She gets along well with her teammate, Yang Xiao Long. Fans and reviewers either shipped them as "Bumbleby" after the episode "Burning the Candle", or noted their growing relationship over the show's seasons. At the end of the show's sixth season, Yang works with Blake to kill Adam Taurus, and her romantic feelings were "strongly hinted". She also is close to Sun Wukong in other episodes. In the Volume 9 episode "Confessions Within Cumulonimbus Clouds", Blake and Yang accept their feelings for one another and kiss. Some reviewers also noted romantic subtext between both characters in RWBY: Ice Queendom.	United States.
Jay Bilzerian	Big Mouth	September 29, 2017	He has shown various moments of being sexually attracted to women as well as Matthew, even sharing a kiss with one another after Jay stated the phrase, "Hey, man, a mouth's a mouth".	United States
Bow	She-Ra and the Princesses of Power	November 13, 2018	In a Twitch stream on June 9, 2020, Lee Knox Ostertag stated she doesn't believe Bow or Glimmer are heterosexual, a sentiment series creator ND Stevenson concurred with, saying they are "definitely not straight". In the last episode of the show's final season, "Heart Part 2", Bow and Glimmer kissed, making their relationship canon, while Adora imagines Bow and Glimmer in a long-term relationship, possibly even married. Some have said Bow and Glimmer are bisexual, which would imply that Bow had a crush on Seahawk. Others have stated Bow is trans after he wore a binder in the episode "Shadows of Mystacor". The latter is a fan interpretation that Stevenson is "very fond of".	Japan
Dio Brando	JoJo's Bizarre Adventure	October 5, 2012	Dio is canonically bisexual in both the anime and manga. In the 2007 Eureka interview with Araki (the author of the franchise), when asked about Dio's sexuality, Araki responded: "...Dio's sort of a composed character that could go either way. He could go with a man or a woman". Dio's sexuality is incidental to his villainy.	Japan
Reiner Braun	Attack on Titan	April 14, 2013	In Chapter 38 of the manga and Episode 4 Season 2 of the anime, there was a conversation between Ymir and Reiner, in which Ymir said that Reiner "doesn’t seem like the kind of guy who is interested in women.."., to which Reiner replied in the affirmative and added that Ymir does not look like a girl who is interested in guys either. Considering that Ymir is a lesbian, this is actually a double coming out of the characters to each other. The character description in the DVD booklet also indicates that Reiner has a "high BL index", the only one of the male characters. Despite that, Reiner has shown some interest in Historia several times throughout the story, although he never told her about it. In the context of his split personality, his sexuality becomes even more complex.	Japan
Cherri Bomb	Hazbin Hotel	October 28, 2019	Cherri Bomb joins the Hazbin Hotel. Official Pride Month merch shows her holding and wearing the colors of the bisexual flag.	United States
Clarence	Final Space	February 15, 2018	A recurring character, he has an ex-wife, several since-deceased wives, and two adopted children (Fox and Ash Graven). He also is implied to be in love with General Cataloupe and has unrequited love on Sheryl Goodspeed. Series creator Olan Rogers said that he "always saw Clarence as a Bi-Sexual".	United States
Clarence	Sword Art Online Alternative Gun Gale Online	June 9, 2018	In episode 9, Clarence, a fellow GGO player, is dying and Karen demands Clarence give up her remaining magazines. Clarence demands a kiss in exchange and reveals she is female (and chose an androgynous avatar) and that she is bisexual.	Japan
Wendy Corduroy	Gravity Falls	June 15, 2012	In August 2020, show creator Alex Hirsch implied that Wendy is bisexual in a tweet. Wendy is a mellow, tomboyish, laid-back 15-year-old part-time employee at the Mystery Shack, and she stated that she had many boyfriends in the past, including one ex-boyfriend with whom she cannot remember breaking up.	United States
Jeremy De Longpre	Allen Gregory	October 30, 2011	Richard and Jeremy are the fathers of the title character. Jeremy is a former social worker who had a loving wife and family, although this changed after Richard became one of his clients. Richard was attracted to Jeremy to the point where he started stalking him and his family until Jeremy finally agreed to be his husband. Jeremy left his wife and children for Richard, who offered him an easy, no-maintenance life as his trophy husband.	United States
Enid	OK K.O.! Let's Be Heroes	August 1, 2017	Enid is a witch and ninja who loves Red Action. In the episode, "We Messed Up" when Enid sees Mr. Gar's photo of KO's young mom, she eagerly asks who the "babe" is. Also, when Enid and K.O. are biking to Rad's house in "Hope This Flies", Enid's helmet has a peace sign sticker colored as the bisexual pride flag. Enid also has possibly romantic feelings toward Elodie. Red Action and Enid shared a kiss at the end of the episode, "Red Action 3: Grudgement Day", in the show's final season.	United States
Entrapta	She-Ra and the Princesses of Power	November 13, 2018	Entrapta, princess of Dryl, is a skilled but reckless inventor. She is one of the most knowledgeable people on First Ones' tech in Etheria. Entrapta first sees Hordak, head of the Horde, as her work partner, and reunites with him in the show's last season, with both walking off together in the show's final episode. Their relationship was confirmed as canon by series creator ND Stevenson (Note: From 3:55:40 to 3:57:26 in the video, ND says, "Entrapta has a lot of robot boyfriends and girlfriends...Entrapdak is canon...The robots learn to love because of her, and that's like Hordak," while making a number of other comments about Entrapta and Hordak.) and character designer Rae Geiger. According to Stevenson, Entrapta "sees humanity in everything" and had "lots of robot boyfriends and girlfriends", along with her relationship with the ship, Darla, in "some capacity".	United States
Ertegun	Carole & Tuesday	April 10, 2019	In episode 2, Ertegun states that he has love "only for capable dudes and great chicks".	Japan
Sleepy Gary	Rick and Morty	August 16, 2015	In "Total Rickall", Sleepy Gary is one of the dozens of aliens that alter the memories of Rick, Morty, Beth, and Summer in order to pose as friends and family members. Because of the fake memories, Beth believes herself to be married to Sleepy Gary, and Jerry believes he is having a secret affair with him.	United States
Glimmer	She-Ra and the Princesses of Power	November 13, 2018	In a romantic relationship with her long-time childhood friend, which is shown to be canon in the final episode of the show's final season, "Heart Part 2", Bow and Glimmer kiss. Series creator ND Stevenson said that she was "definitely not straight". In that episode, Adora imagines Bow and Glimmer in a long-term relationship, possibly even married. She may have had a crush on Adora.	Japan
Halo	Young Justice	January 4, 2018	Halo's first love interest is Geo-Force/Brion, a male character, and they declare at a meeting that they "do not know that I am a girl or a boy, as Earth languages define the word".. Later, Halo kisses a female character, Harper Row, who is also bisexual, in the third season of Young Justice.	United States
Ryoma Ichijo	Love Stage!!	July 9, 2014	A 20-year-old popular actor and hard worker. Falls in love with Izumi Sato, despite not being comfortable with the idea of being in a relationship with another man, as he struggling to accept his feelings despite having previously only liked women.	Japan
Poison Ivy	Harley Quinn	November 29, 2019	In love with Harley Quinn, with their relationship beginning after they kiss in the seventh episode of the show's second season, "There's No Place to Go But Down" following a prison escape, with the first season beginning with a slow-born journey "of self-discovery" for her and Harley.	United States
Akihiko Kaji	Given	July 11, 2019	Akihiko has a romantic history with both men and women. He eventually falls in love with the leader of his band, Haruki Nakayama, himself a bisexual man, and starts to date him.	Japan
Yuri Katsuki	Yuri on Ice	May 26, 2017	Yuri and Victor get engaged giving each other gold rings In episode 1, Yuri expresses a former crush he had on his female friend Yuuko.	Japan
Yuzu Aihara	Citrus	January 6, 2018	Yuzu is initially looking for a relationship with a boy in the pilot episode, but over the course of the series develops a romantic relationship with her step-sister, Mei Aihara.	Japan
Yuzu Kichougasaki	Love Tyrant	April 6, 2017	She has a crush on her half-sister, Akane Hiyama, but later in the series she develops feelings for Seiji Aino, as indicated in the show's ninth episode.	Japan
Zen Kirishima	The World's Greatest First Love	May 21, 2011	Begins a relationship with Takafumi Yokozawa, and was earlier married before his wife tragically died, as shown in the movie connected to this franchise.	Japan
Korra	The Legend of Korra	April 14, 2012	Begins a romantic relationship with Asami Sato with both holding hands and looking into each other's eyes while traveling through a portal into the spirit world, with their relationship confirmed by the series creators. In the graphic novel The Legend of Korra: Turf Wars, the sequel to the animated series, Korra is shown in a romantic relationship with Asami.Korra and Asami are in a relationship.	United States
Kyoshi	The Legend of Korra	June 23, 2012	Michael Dante DiMartino, one of the series creators, in an interview with EW, noted that while the show's crew had always believed she was bisexual, her feelings toward women and men were actually only explored in the young adult novel and in the comics branching off of the series.	United States
Lagoon Boy (La'gaan)	Young Justice	March 4, 2011	La'gaan first appeared in season 1. Lagoon Boy then appeared in season 2 as the jealous boyfriend of Miss Martian. In season 4, he is shown to be in a polyamorous relationship with a man and a woman.	United States
Marie Logan	Young Justice	November 26, 2010	Marie Logan is introduced in the first season as the mother of Garfield Logan / Beast Boy. In a tie-in comic, Queen Bee uses her control of pheromones to enthrall Marie, with her abilities only working on people that are sexually attracted to women. This means Marie was either a lesbian or bisexual and her powers tied to her sexual attraction.	United States
Mei Aihara	Citrus	January 6, 2018	In the pilot episode, Mei is engaged to her male teacher, Amamiya. Their relationship ends when Yuzu Aihara exposes his behavior to the school and he is consequently fired from his position. After this, Mei develops a romantic relationship with her step-sister Yuzu and they officially date at the end of the series.	Japan
Loona	Helluva Boss	November 25, 2019	Loona, one of the main characters of Helluva Boss, is a demon and member of I.M.P. Official art posted for Pride Month in 2024 depicted her with the colors of the bisexual pride flag.	United States
Luna Loud	The Loud House	May 2, 2016	Luna shows attraction to Hugh, her brother's tutor, in "Study Muffin", and sends a love letter to a girl named Sam in "L is for Love". Sam seems to feel similarly about Luna, as shown in the latter episode. Sam Sharp appears to reciprocate Luna's feelings in that episode and others, with some describing them as beginning to date in the episode "Racing Hearts". However, in June 2021, Kevin Sullivan, a story editor for The Loud House told Insider that Luna was intended to a lesbian, but said that he was glad the team didn't push it further because Luna then becomes "representative of so many more young people struggling with their identity", implying that fan interpretations of her as bisexual was still valid.	United States
Lukkage	Gargantia on the Verdurous Planet	April 21, 2013	She has two female sex slaves who also serve as her co-pilots for her mecha, as shown in the episode "The Villainous Empress" and other episodes. Later she develops a romantic interest in Pinion. In the two OVAs for the show, "Far Beyond the Voyage" parts 1 and 2, Lukkage is a former pirate involved with salvaging and guarding Gargantia from threats, with her two companions still by her side, helping her run the ship and gather intel.	Japan
Ash Lynx	Banana Fish	July 5, 2018	Ash has slept with men and women during his time as a prostitute. He mainly has relationships with men such as Eiji, while dealing with childhood trauma from molestation. While has a close relationship with Eiji, he admitted in one episode that he had a relationship with a girl who was killed "under suspicion of being his girlfriend".	Japan
Honoka Maki	Kiznaiver	April 10, 2016	Honoka is in love with a girl named Ruru and wants a romantic relationship with her, as shown in the show's sixth and seventh episodes. Maki later has feelings for a male friend named Yuta and their attractions toward each other are reciprocal.	Japan
Yumi Mamiya	MM!	October 9, 2010	She hates Taro and loves Tatsukichi, but does not know that Tatsukichi is a cross-dresser, and in other scenes, it is implied that she has lesbian tendencies when groping and fondling Arashiko and Mio.	Japan
Marie	Carole & Tuesday	May 1, 2019	Marie used to date Gus, but now is in a relationship with Anne, and the two plan to get married soon, as shown in episode 4.	Japan
Marceline the Vampire Queen	Adventure Time	May 17, 2010	Marceline is bisexual as she dated a male wizard named Ash, and in the series finale, shared an on-screen kiss with Princess Bubblegum, confirming their relationship. The latter had been hinted at and subtle since the episode "What Was Missing", leading fans to ship these characters. Additionally, Marceline's VA, Olivia Olson confirmed that Marceline and Princess Bubblegum had dated. In Adventure Time: Distant Lands, the episode "Obsidian" focused on Marceline and Bubblegum's relationship.	United States
Hotaru Mizushina	NTR: Netsuzou Trap	July 5, 2017	In love with Yuma Okazaki but als has a boyfriend, cheating on her. In the final episode, Hotaru's feelings for Yuma are reciprocated.	Japan
Charlie Morningstar	Hazbin Hotel	October 28, 2019	Charlie is described as "gay" by news anchor Katie Killjoy, while she is shown as being in a relationship with Vaggie in the pilot episode. Charlie was implied to be bisexual based on the colors of the bisexual pride flag appearing in a tweet from her account, describing Charlie and Vaggie's intimate relationship as to that of Jack Skeleton and Sally's relationship from The Nightmare Before Christmas. In season 2, Charlie clarifies that she is bisexual.	United States
Moxxie	Helluva Boss	November 25, 2019	Moxxie, one of the protagonists of Helluva Boss, is a demon, assassin, and weapons expert of I.M.P. He has a wife, Millie. On Bi Visibility Day, in September 2020, series creator Vivienne Medrano revealed he is bisexual on her Twitter account. In the season 2 episode "Exes and Oohs", Moxxie is revealed to have a male ex, Chaz, and comes out as bisexual to his father.	United States
Yuma Okazaki	NTR: Netsuzou Trap	July 5, 2017	The story centers around two high school girls named Yuma and Hotaru who each have a boyfriend but secretly cheat with each other. Yuma cannot explain the feeling she gets around Hotaru, which eventually leads her to believe that their relationship may be more than just a friendship. In the final episode, "Why Did It Take Me This Long to Realize?", Yuma finally realizes that Hotaru has had feelings for her all along and confesses her love for her.	Japan
Sir Pentious	Hazbin Hotel	October 28, 2019	Sir Pentious joins the Hazbin Hotel. He is bisexual.	United States
Pitohui "Pito"	Sword Art Online Alternative Gun Gale Online	April 22, 2018	In episode 12, after revealing that she is Elsa Kanzaki, she kisses the main character Karen on the lips and flirts with her. M/Goshi Asogi, who is her manservant and in love with her, warns Karen that Elsa goes through men and women relatively quickly.	Japan
Plum	Bravest Warriors	January 20, 2013	Plum had a crush on Chris, kissing him multiple times during the show in the episodes "Gas-Powered Stick", "Hamster Priest" and "Merewif Tag", even as she rejected advanced from Danny and Wallow in the episode "Mexican Touchdown". She is also madly in love with her doppelganger, as shown in the canonical comics while she entered a relationship with a female character named Peach in another comic. Furthermore, on numerous occasions, she has identified as bisexual, confirmed by Kate Leth, who wrote all three volumes of the Bravest Warriors comic, writing "Plum is bi and it's canon and I'm proud of her".	United States
Plum	Bravest Warriors	January 20, 2013		Canada
Harley Quinn	Harley Quinn	November 29, 2019	Harley and Ivy are best friends. After much buildup to Harley and Ivy's relationship, in the seventh episode of the show's second season, "There's No Place to Go But Down", they both kiss after Harley saved Ivy, following their escape from prison. This episode happened after the first season began a "slow burn journey of self-discovery" for her and Ivy.	United States
Harper Row	Young Justice	January 25, 2019	Harper Row is the bisexual friend to Violet Harper and Fred Bugg. In the episode, "Early Warning", she drunkenly kissed Violet even though both of them have boyfriends. In the original comics, she explicitly refers to herself as bisexual.	United States
Asami Sato	The Legend of Korra	April 28, 2012	In The Legend of Korra, both Asami and Korra are romantically involved with Mako at different points. The series finale, "The Last Stand", ended with Korra and Asami holding hands and looking into each other's eyes while traveling through a portal right before the ending credits. The creators later confirmed the intention of the ending scene was to show Asami and Korra becoming a romantic couple. In the graphic novel The Legend of Korra: Turf Wars, which is the sequel to the animated series, Korra and Asami are in a relationship.	United States
Izumi Sena	Love Stage!!	July 9, 2014	An 18-year-old geeky university student. The two fall in love despite Izumi initially not being comfortable with the idea of being in a relationship with another man, while Ryoma struggles to accept his feelings despite having previously only liked women.	Japan
Beth Smith	Rick and Morty	January 27, 2014	In the episode "Bethic Twinstinct", Beth has an affair with her clone Space Beth, and they later have a threesome with Jerry after being found out.	United States
Suzuka	Akame ga Kill!	November 2, 2014	She is bisexual, having shown enjoyment at being beaten by a group of spies and showing sexual interest in Esdeath and Tatsumi, indicated in episodes like "Kill the Fate".	Japan
Kanade Suzutsuki	Mayo Chiki!	July 7, 2011	She notes that Kinjirō is the first, and only, man who is willing to talk her down and she has fallen in love with him as a result. She is also implied to be a bisexual as she has claimed that Subaru was her first love.	Japan
The Nines	Darling in the Franxx	March 31, 2018	Although their piloting system is also a "couple" of a boy and a girl, throughout the show their squad is positioned as an "alternative" to traditional heterosexual relationship, and the leader of the Nines even several times lectures on the meaninglessness of gender differences. Previously, he also openly notes his bisexuality, being attracted not only to Ichigo, but also to Hiro as a "cute boy".	Japan
Jackie Lynn Thomas	Star vs. the Forces of Evil	January 18, 2015	Jackie-Lynn and Marco start dating in the episode "Bon Bon the Birthday Clown", but ended their relationship in the episode "Sophomore Slump" due to Marco's feelings for Star. In the episode "Britta's Tacos", it is revealed Jackie has a relationship with a French girl named Chloé.	United States
Professor Venomous	OK K.O.! Let's Be Heroes	August 17, 2017	Ian Jones-Quartey confirmed Professor Venomous is bisexual, when asked by a fan, but is not non-binary.	United States
Vox	Hazbin Hotel	October 28, 2019	Vox is an antagonist. He is bisexual.	United States
Saki Watanabe	From the New World	September 29, 2012	She loved Shun for a long time but dates Maria and later marries Satoru, shown in the episode "Omen". Since she is one of the main characters, she appears "ambiguously bisexual".	Japan
Sayaka "Ayaka" Watanabe	The Kawai Complex Guide to Manors and Hostel Behavior	April 3, 2014	Ayaka is a college student who loves to lead men on but reveals later on that she dates both men and women and loves reading BL in the episode "Thought So". She also is shown to have a sexual attraction to her fellow dormmate Mayumi, whom she often fondles despite the latter's resentment.	Japan
Sasha Waybright	Amphibia	June 14, 2019	Sasha is Anne and Marcy's friend who got transported to Amphibia with them. In the series finale episode "The Hardest Thing", Sasha is shown to have a bisexual pride sticker on the interior mirror of her car. Immediately after the episode aired, series creator Matt Braly stated directly in a tweet that the character was bisexual. Sasha is voiced by bisexual actress Anna Akana.	United States
Charteux "Char" Westia	Boarding School Juliet	October 13, 2018	The male protagonist, Romio, discovered that Char was in love with Juliet, the female protagonist, in the episode "Romio and Princess Char".	Japan
Takafumi Yokozawa	The World's Greatest First Love	May 21, 2011	Claims to have liked women in the past, but fell in love with Masamune Takano, who did not reciprocate his feelings. He later enters a relationship with Zen Kirishima, who was once happily married until his wife died, as shown in the movie connected to the franchise.	Japan
Kou Yukina	The World's Greatest First Love	March 22, 2011	Shouta Kisa has a bad habit of falling for good looking men and falls for Kou, but is scared to pursue a relationship as he feels love does not really exist. Kou dated women in the past but later falls in love with Shouta and the two develop a strong romantic relationship.	Japan
Zess (Luka Corosszeira)	The Betrayal Knows My Name	April 11, 2010	Yuzuki's previous incarnation was a woman named Yuki, who was in love with a man named Luka. In the present, Yuki, now in a male form, is highly protective of Luka, and vice versa, with both highly protective of each other, with implied romantic ties between them.	Japan

== 2020s ==
Characters	Show title	Character debut date	Notes	Country
Sophia Ascart	My Next Life as a Villainess: All Routes Lead to Doom!	April 18, 2020	In the eighth episode, when inside the book world, Sophia pins Catarina against a wall, confesses her love, and proposes they move in together. Although Catarina does not understand the ramifications of this confession, Maria and Mary, who also have crushes on Catarina, recognize it full well. In the ninth episode, "Things Got Crazy at a Slumber Party.."., Anne Shelley observes that Sophia tries to get Catarina to realize that she has feelings for her, but to no avail. Sophia also has feelings for men as well, and her brother is Nicol.	Japan
Daphne Blake	Velma	January 12, 2023	Daphne Blake is portrayed as an Asian foundling who has a crush on Velma Dinkley. She dated Fred Jones until they broke up. Velma and Daphne kissed in the second episode "The Candy (Wo)man". She also has two mothers Donna and Linda Blake.	United States
Maria Campbell	My Next Life as a Villainess: All Routes Lead to Doom!	April 25, 2020	When Catarina saves Maria from bullies, in the episode "I Enrolled in the Magic Academy.."., she steals a romantic event from Geordo, causing Maria to begin falling love with Catarina in the fourth episode of the series. In the following episode, Catarina steals a major romantic scene from Keith unintentionally, and they grow closer together. In a later episode, "Things Got Crazy at a Slumber Party.."., Anne Shelley says that Maria shows her love for Catarina by sharing her sweets with her. In the episode "The Moment of My Doom Arrived... Part 1", Maria defends Catarina from false charges and says that Catarina means a lot to her. In the show's season one finale, Catarina asks her who she likes, and she says "the only one I love, admire, and want to be with for all time is you, Lady Catarina. So please allow me to stay by your side from now on". Maria likely has feelings for men as well, as her line she tells Catarina was supposed to be spoken to a man in the original game.	Japan
Velma Dinkley	Velma	January 12, 2023	While Velma initially had a crush on Daphne's former boyfriend Fred, she is receptive to Daphne's romantic feelings towards her. They also kissed in the second episode "The Candy (Wo)man".	United States
Laura Feinberg	Little Demon	August 25, 2022	Laura Feinberg is Chrissy's mother and Satan's ex-lover. In the episode "Wet Bodies", Laura is revealed to be bisexual as she formerly had a same-sex relationship with Sea Hag. Laura is voiced by bisexual actress Aubrey Plaza.	United States
Mary Hunt	My Next Life as a Villainess: All Routes Lead to Doom!	April 11, 2020	She develops romantic feelings toward the series protagonist, Catarina, differing from the script of the otome game, Fortune Lover, beginning in the second episode of the series, "A Prince Challenged Me To a Fight..". In the ninth episode, "Things Got Crazy at a Slumber Party.."., Anne Shelley, Catarina's maid, observes that Mary loves Catarina so much that she concocted a "terrifying plan" of sorts to get them to stay together. In the same episode, Mary, in a sleepover with Catarina, Sophia, and Maria, admits she likes Catarina, saying she and someone she loved would trade dresses. Her fiancé is Alan.	Japan
Norma Khan	Dead End: Paranormal Park	June 16, 2022	Norma is Barney's Pakistani-American, autistic best friend. Although she was assumed to be pansexual, due to an illustration by series creator Hamish Steele showing her holding the pansexual pride flag, he later clarified in a Twitter direct message that she likes multiple genders but initially did not identify with any specific label. She comes out as bisexual in the second season. She has a crush on Badyah Hassan, her friendly, sarcastic friend of Iranian descent who works at Dead End with her and seemingly returns her feelings. However, Badyah turns her down in the second season as she is straight.	United States
Martha	Helluva Boss	October 31, 2020	Martha is a target of I.M.P in the show's first episode, "Murder Family", in which their client Mrs. Mayberry hires them to kill Martha, her ex-husband's mistress. In a later episode, "Apology Tour", it is implied that Martha and Mrs. Mayberry have entered a relationship. Martha is shown wearing the colors of the bisexual flag in official Pride Month merchandise.	United States
Suletta Mercury	Mobile Suit Gundam: The Witch from Mercury	October 2, 2022	Initially showing attraction to men and not knowing about the idea of same-sex relationships, Suletta Mercury, the main character, gradually develops mutual romantic feelings for Miorine, the girl whose fiancé she accidentally becomes. Although the show mostly tries to keep it within the subtext, in the end, both girls in one way or another declare a clear desire to actually get married and are shown as spouses with rings on their ring fingers at the end of the story. The status of the two girls as a married same-sex couple was also confirmed by their voice actresses on the final stream on the day of the show's final episode. Thus, Suletta becomes not only the official first female, but also the first LGBTQ protagonist in a franchise.	Japan
Nico Minoru	Your Friendly Neighborhood Spider-Man	January 29, 2025	In this series, Nico Minoru is portrayed as Peter Parker's best friend. As in the comics, she is bisexual, teasing Peter that she will ask out his crush, Pearl Pangan, if he doesn't do so, and she is, also, a love interest for Peter.	United States
Luz Noceda	The Owl House	January 10, 2020	Luz Noceda, the main character of The Owl House, has shown explicit interest in men and women. As shown in the second episode, "Witches Before Wizards" Luz meets a character named Nevareth, who she reacts to in a way similar to that of a small crush or infatuation. In the episode "Lost In Language", she's shown to be blushing at both Edric and Emira Blight. A few episodes later, in "Adventures in the Elements", she states, "I've got a new crush, and her name is education". In the episode "Knock, Knock, Knockin' on Hooty's Door", she and Amity Blight officially become girlfriends. In season 3 episode "Thanks to Them", Luz is shown coming out to her mom during a montage, and wears a bisexual pride pin for much of the episode. Dana Terrace, the series's creator, confirmed on Twitter she wanted to make a bisexual character. On September 2, during a Reddit AMA, Terrace officially confirmed Luz to be bisexual. She also stated Luz is "oblivious to some things in front of her", including Amity's crush on her. Luz is the first bisexual lead character on a Disney Channel show.	United States
Graham Prescott	Rugrats	May 21, 2021	Graham Prescott is a flamboyant aging hippy. He first appeared in the first episode "Second Time Around" in which he is one of Grandpa Lou's dates from the seniors-only dating app Silver Beagles that Angelica only used to get cookies and sweets out of elderly people. Graham is shown to be romantically interested in Lou. Lou turns him down but they both become friends. In the holiday episode "Traditions", Graham is interested in Betty's aunt Tia Esperanza.	United States
Vex'ahlia "Vex" de Rolo	The Legend of Vox Machina	January 28, 2022	Vex'ahlia and Vax'ildan are half-Elf twin siblings and members of the Vox Machina team. Both siblings are bisexual.	United States
Vax'ildan "Vax" Vessar	The Legend of Vox Machina	January 28, 2022	Vex'ahlia and Vax'ildan are half-Elf twin siblings and members of the Vox Machina team. Both siblings are bisexual.	United States
Saki Saki	Girlfriend, Girlfriend	July 3, 2021	She dates her childhood friend and classmate, Naoya Mukai, but their classmate, Nagisa Minase, also confesses her feelings to Naoya. After some initial hesitation, Naoya accepts Nagisa's request to be her boyfriend as well. Naoya decides that he will date both Saki and Nagisa at the same time. Since the first episode of the first season of the anime, Saki displays "signs of bi-panic" with hints at her bisexuality.	Japan
Bethany "Space Beth" Smith	Rick and Morty	May 31, 2020	In the episode "Bethic Twinstinct", Space Beth has an affair with her clone Earth Beth, and they later have a threesome with Jerry after being found out.	United States
Melissa Tartleton	M.O.D.O.K.	May 21, 2021	Melissa Tartleton is M.O.D.O.K's 17-year-old daughter who shares her father's appearance. Melissa is a popular girl who wants to be a supervillain. She is also openly bisexual. While her sexuality is not remarked upon in the first season. It was planned to be explored in season 2 according to Melissa's voice actor Melissa Fumero. However the series was cancelled before that could happen.	United States
Tulip	Oh My God... Yes!	March 9, 2025	In the second episode, a robot girl named Strawberry breaks up with her after she slept with a man named Silken Tofu boy, and because she is overprotective, saying she loves her, but she doesn't feel safe around her, causing Tulip to lose it. She becomes involved with a male spider, which she calls "Rutherford", afterward. She is also friends with Ladi and Sunny.	United States
Sophie Walten	The Walten Files	April 26, 2020	The protagonist of Episode Three, "Bunnyfarm". Series creator Marten Walls confirmed that she is bisexual, and that the other girl who can be heard in the episode, Jenny Letterson, is her girlfriend.	Chile
Odie Cliff	Odie Cliff: Son Of Wind.	September 12, 2025,	The main character for all of the Odie Cliff Series, Dennis Darkwood ends up with him in the fourth season/book	

== See also ==
- List of fictional bisexual characters
- List of bisexual characters in television
- List of fictional polyamorous characters
- List of animated series with LGBT characters
- List of comedy television series with LGBT characters
- List of dramatic television series with LGBT characters: 1960s–2000s
- List of dramatic television series with LGBT characters: 2010–2015
- List of dramatic television series with LGBT characters: 2016–2019
- Lists of LGBT figures in fiction and myth
- LGBTQ themes in Western animation
- LGBTQ themes in anime and manga
- Bisexual literature
- Media portrayals of bisexuality
- Bisexual erasure
- Bisexual chic
- The Bisexual Option
