= Haruhi Fujioka =

Fictional character from Ouran High School Host Club

- Ouran High School Host Club character
- Haruhi Fujioka as illustrated by Bisco Hatori
- First appearance: Ouran High School Host Club, Chapter 01 (2002)
- Created by: Bisco Hatori
- Portrayed by: Haruna Kawaguchi; Yuka Yamauchi (musical)
- Voiced by: Japanese: Aya Hisakawa (2003 drama CDs) Maaya Sakamoto (anime, 2006–present); English: Caitlin Glass
- Notable relatives: Ryoji "Ranka" Fujioka (father); Kotoko Fujioka (mother, deceased)

Haruhi Fujioka (Japanese: 藤岡 ハルヒ, Hepburn: Fujioka Haruhi) is the fictional protagonist of the manga series Ouran High School Host Club, created by the Japanese artist and writer Bisco Hatori. She is a commoner student attending the elite Ouran Academy on a scholarship, and incurs a massive debt to the school's eponymous "Host Club" by accidentally breaking an expensive vase. Mistaken for a boy due to her disheveled and androgynous appearance, she is forced to work as a male host to pay off the debt, maintaining the position even after the club's members discover she is female.

== Concept and creation ==
=== Development and design ===
The premise for Ouran High School Host Club originated during the serialization of Millennium Snow, when series creator Bisco Hatori's editor proposed a concept modeled after Japanese host clubs, featuring "handsome boys" at a "very rich high school". Hatori intended the series to parody shōjo manga tropes. During the series' prototype stages, Haruhi Fujioka was conceived as a male protagonist. Prior to its publication as a one-shot in the magazine LaLa in September 2002, a senior editor proposed a gender swap for Haruhi. Hatori initially hesitated to adopt the change, doubting she could provide a unique justification for the gender-bending trope.

Noting that characters in the genre typically follow this trope "with a purpose", Hatori sought to subvert it by establishing no ulterior motive for Haruhi to dress as male, rather, that she simply wears the clothing she likes. Hatori designed Haruhi with the perspective that one's biological sex does not matter, later expanding upon this concept to develop Haruhi's cross-dressing father, Ryoji. Because Haruhi had no intention of passing as male, Hatori deliberately avoided making the character appear "rough", instead illustrating her using subtle, cute poses. She also designed Haruhi to be inherently selfless, noting the character must never act in a discriminatory manner and should always be motivated to help others. Following the one-shot, the series began regular serialization in LaLa in April 2003.

=== Voice actors ===
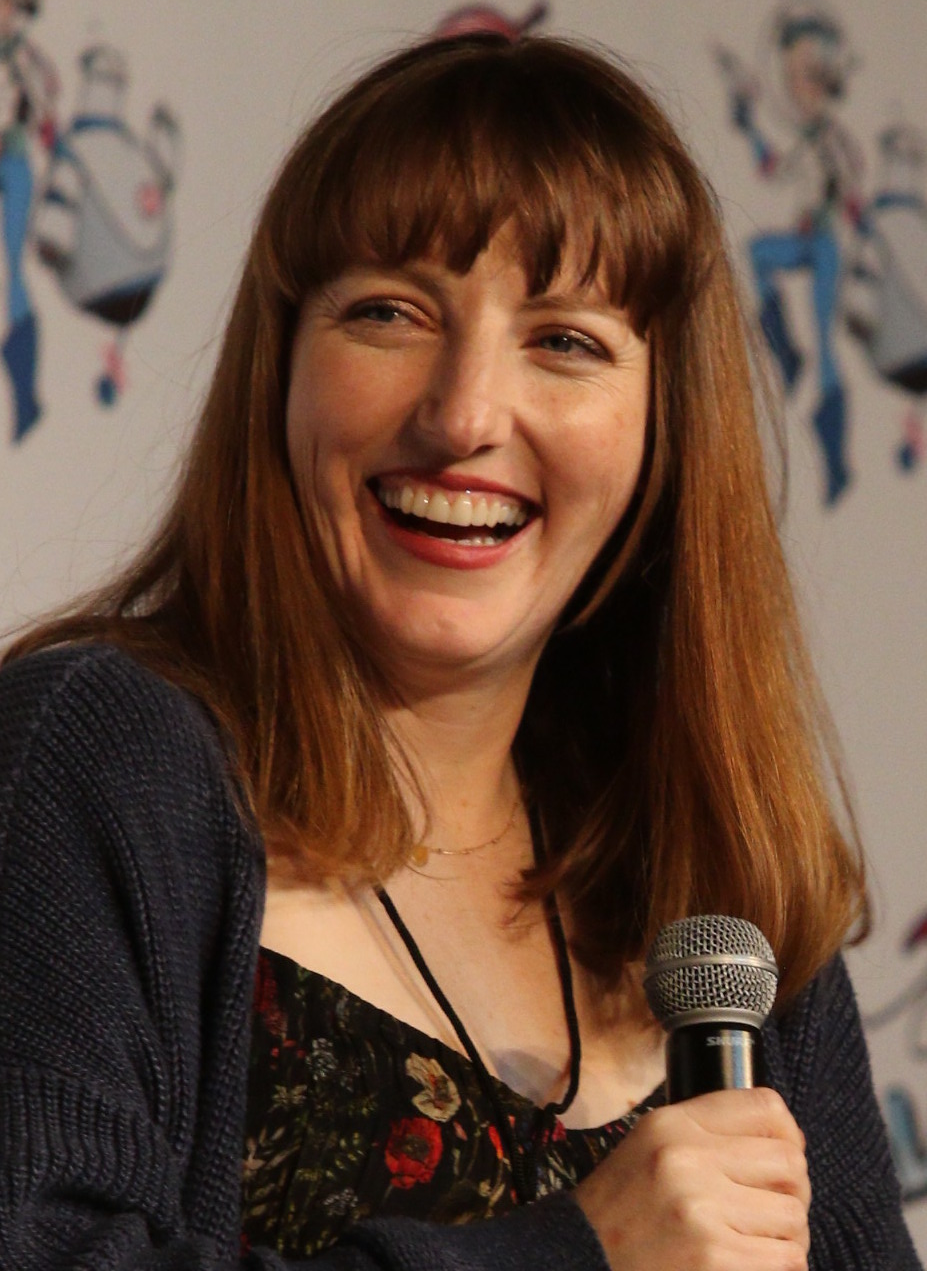
Caitlin Glass voiced Haruhi Fujioka in the anime's English dub

Haruhi Fujioka was first voiced by Japanese actress Aya Hisakawa in a series of drama CDs distributed by LaLa between 2003 and 2005. For the 2006 anime adaptation, the voice cast was entirely changed, with the exception of Kenichi Suzumura, who was recast from Kaoru to Hikaru, with Maaya Sakamoto taking over the role of Haruhi. Sakamoto recalled that prior to her casting, she had felt unsuited for anime voice acting as opposed to live-action dubbing, crediting the role of Haruhi as "a major turning point" in her career that felt "freeing" and allowed her to truly enjoy voice acting work. Sakamoto later provided audio commentary for a 2011 Blu-ray series box set alongside series director Takuya Igarashi and head writer Yōji Enokido.

Caitlin Glass voiced Haruhi in the English-language dub produced by Funimation, alongside serving as the series' ADR director. Though Glass described the role of Haruhi as one of her "most challenging", she also considered it to be one of her favorites. Glass later recalled the difficulties of adapting to Haruhi's "young [and] boyish" vocal register while simultaneously directing her own voice acting for the first time.

== Appearances ==
=== In Ouran High School Host Club ===
At the start of the Ouran High School Host Club manga and anime, Haruhi enters the prestigious Ouran Academy on a scholarship. Looking for a quiet place to study, she stumbles upon the school's male-only host club, where she is initially mistaken for a boy due to her short hair and oversized clothing because she lacks sufficient funds to purchase a female school uniform. After knocking over an expensive vase, the club forces her to work off her debt by becoming a host. Haruhi identifies herself as a biological female, but does not view gender identity as important. She therefore agrees to portray herself as a boy in order to repay her debt to the club. She carries on, keeping her sex secret from the club's clientele, by wearing a male uniform and using masculine pronouns. At first, Haruhi dislikes being forced to work for the host club. However, as the plot advances, Haruhi slowly grows less introverted and starts to realize that the boys of the host club have become her best friends who are helping her to learn and grow into a better person.

=== In other media ===
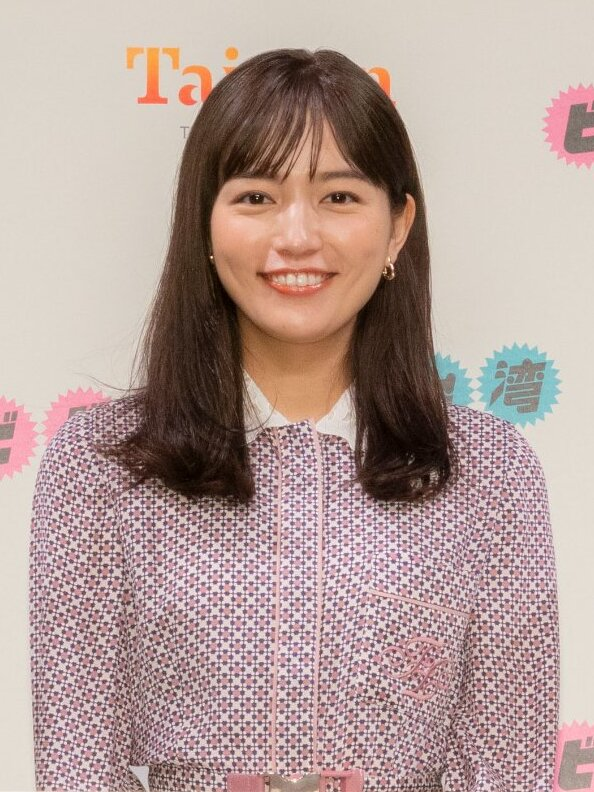
Haruna Kawaguchi portrayed Haruhi in live-action adaptations

Outside of the manga and anime series, Haruhi has appeared in several official adaptations of Ouran High School Host Club. Prior to the anime's production, she was voiced by Aya Hisakawa in a series of drama CDs from 2003 to 2005. She serves as the player character in an eponymous visual novel originally released for the PlayStation 2 in 2007 by Idea Factory. The game later received an enhanced Nintendo DS port in 2009, developed by the subsidiary Design Factory. Haruhi also appears in two Ouran light novels published by Hakusensha, Tobikkiri! (2008) and Totteoki! (2009), which feature exclusive storylines.

Haruhi has also been portrayed in several live-action adaptations. In 2011, Japanese actress Haruna Kawaguchi starred as Haruhi in a live-action television series, subsequently reprising the role for a 2012 mobile spin-off drama, as well as a feature film sequel later that year. Additionally, actress Yuka Yamauchi portrayed Haruhi in a series of stage musicals that ran from 2022 to 2023.

== Reception ==
Ramsey Isler of IGN listed Haruhi among his 25 "greatest anime characters." Stating that while the reverse harem genre of anime had been "done to death" by the time the Ouran High School Host Club anime was released, Haruhi's character went against the established tropes of the genre. Described as "super tomboyish, demure, and not at all moe," Haruhi is considered a good contrast to the eccentric cast of rich boys. In an anime review, IGN's D.F. Smith praised both Caitlin Glass and Maaya Sakamoto for their performance as Haruhi in their respective languages, reporting that it is a "tricky role". Sakamoto was nominated for a Seiyu Award in 2007 for her portrayal of Haruhi.

Rose Bridges of Anime News Network lauded Haruhi as one of the "freshest elements" of the anime. Comparing Haruhi to Tohru Honda from Fruits Basket and Tsukushi Makino from Boys Over Flowers because of her strong sense of empathy and her "take-no-crap" attitude respectively, Bridges praised the character for her intelligence, ability to speak her mind and her "blasé approach to gender roles."

=== Gender and themes ===
Critics and scholars frequently analyze Haruhi's character as a parody and subversion of traditional shōjo manga tropes. Tanya Darlington argues that Ouran uses camp and parody to undermine patriarchal traditions by placing Haruhi—a female commoner—into an elite, male-dominated space, subverting the traditional shōjo narrative and "draw[ing] attention to its ridiculousness through playful, often reverent, exploitation." Sarah Kornfield describes Haruhi's cross-dressing as "utilitarian" and born as a means to pay off a financial debt, arguing that this premise acts as a rhetorical device to redefine gender roles.
