= List of Ouran High School Host Club characters =

This is a list of characters from the manga series Ouran High School Host Club, created by Bisco Hatori. Ouran Academy is an elite upper school catering to the ultra-rich. Haruhi Fujioka is a middle-class scholarship student, a rarity at the school. While searching for a quiet place to study, she stumbles upon an unused music room which turns out to be the club room for the school's Host Club — a group of idle rich boys, possessing exceptional good-looks, who entertain female clients. After accidentally knocking over a priceless Renaissance vase that's worth far more than Haruhi can possibly repay (¥8 million), she is forced to join the Host Club as an "errand boy" to work off her debt. Soon after, however, Haruhi proves to be a natural host (no training needed) and is promoted to full status as a Host of the Ouran Host Club. It then becomes clear that something isn't quite as it seems.

Name romanizations differ among the several different English-language products released for this franchise: English-language editions of the manga published by VIZ Media and Chuang Yi, the anime from Funimation and the Nippon Television's Japanese-language website on the series.

== Host Club members ==
Anime screenshot featuring the Host Club members dressed as caterers. From left to right: "Mori," "Honey," Haruhi, Kaoru and Hikaru, Tamaki and Kyoya Ootori.

=== Haruhi Fujioka ===
Upon discovering Haruhi Fujioka's (藤岡 ハルヒ, Fujioka Haruhi) gender, Tamaki insists that they keep it their secret, which becomes the basis of the gender-bender humor throughout the series. Haruhi is portrayed as a female who firmly believes outward trappings, such as wealth or beauty, are secondary in importance to a person's inner qualities. She is not particularly invested in protecting her gender secret. Her cross-dressing as a boy is largely pragmatic due to her inability to afford the $3,000 school uniform herself and her need to act as a Host to pay off her debt. It is mainly the male Hosts who panic that Haruhi's gender will be exposed, leading them to engage in ridiculous schemes to avoid this, which would result in Haruhi having to leave the club and attracting the attention of other males. She is fairly oblivious to physical or sexual attention in general. For example, she is entirely unfazed when the twins lick cookie crumbs off her face to rile Tamaki.

Haruhi is dedicated to her studies and aspires to enter law school to emulate her deceased mother. Her father has a temperament similar to Tamaki's. He works as a host/bartender in a cross-dressing club to support their middle-class lifestyle, contributing to her lax attitude towards gender. She is practical and honest to a fault but also caring and insightful. Haruhi dislikes needless extravagance, often finding the Host Club's antics annoying, and dislikes the artificial. While not above manipulating them for her reasons, she appreciates the boys' protectiveness and their genuine desire to "make every girl happy." The series shows how Haruhi interacts with each of them in different ways and how her relationships evolve. Haruhi tends to be apathetic towards events, preferring to remain at a distance, and observing until she needs to act. She is astute in gauging other people's motives, and her ability to see people's true intentions through their deception is the main reason others are drawn to her. Haruhi dislikes sweets but has a fondness for seafood. Her desire to try otoro, a costly, high grade of sushi tuna, is a recurring gag.

The manga storyline goes far beyond the 26 episodes of the anime and shows the deepening relationship between Haruhi and Tamaki. There, Haruhi's determination to pursue her education is paramount, and she initially denies her budding feelings for Tamaki. Through ongoing shared life events, which include dissolution of the club due to the Suoh matriarch's orders, Tamaki's reunion with his mother, and Haruhi going to the U.S. to study, the two become a couple. In the omake that follows the manga's conclusion, Haruhi still cannot commit fully to the relationship because of their ages. Still, eventually, they marry, as seen in an omake set two years after the manga's close. They are the first of the Host Club members to have children.

Voiced by: Maaya Sakamoto (Japanese anime and later drama CDs), Aya Hisakawa (early drama CDs), Caitlin Glass (English)
Portrayed by: Haruna Kawaguchi, Yuka Yamauchi (musical)

=== Tamaki Suoh ===
Tamaki Suoh (須王 環, Suō Tamaki), whose full name is René Tamaki Richard de Grantaine (ルネ・環・リシャール・ド・グランテーヌ, Rene Tamaki Rishāru do Gurantēnu), is a 16 year old second-year student at Ouran Academy, a co-founder and the president of the Host Club. Flamboyant and arrogant, he is the princely type, entertaining customers with upper-class etiquette and shameless flattery but is also the main comic relief character of the series. He views the club as a family, specifically the family he never had growing up. He is a hāfu (half-blooded Japanese), living under the custody of his father, the wealthy chairman of Ouran Academy, and is separated from his ailing French mother because of a deal with Shizue, his cold-hearted paternal grandmother. As the series progresses, he finds himself falling in love with Haruhi but is afraid of confessing for fear it will break up the club, but because of their reassurances, he confesses and they eventually become a couple, moving to Boston but the rest of the club surprises them by moving in next door, showing that the club will stay together even after high school.

At the end of the anime, the club is threatened to be shut down by Kyoya's father and Tamaki is blackmailed into marrying a snobby French girl, Éclair Tonnerre, in exchange for seeing his mother again. Haruhi comes after him to convince him the rest of the club needs him and Éclair lets him go, saving the club. Who Haruhi ends up with is left open, but Tamaki, Kyoya, and Hikaru are all hinted.

His family name is romanized by VIZ Media as Suoh.

Voiced by: Mamoru Miyano (anime and later drama CDs), Hikaru Midorikawa (early drama CDs), Vic Mignogna (English)
Portrayed by: Yusuke Yamamoto, Junya Komatsu (musical)

=== Kyoya Ootori ===
Kyoya Ootori (鳳 鏡夜, Ōtori Kyōya) is an attractive, calculating second-year student at Ouran Academy and vice-president of the Host Club. He is 17 years old at the beginning of the series.

Kyoya is best friends with Tamaki, despite their completely different demeanors. Kyoya is secretive and highly intelligent, as his ability to calculate the financial and social benefits that result from the Host Club's adventures demonstrates. He is a realistic and pragmatic person, and officially acts as the club's accountant and manager. Unofficially, he is considered the "Shadow King," running the club behind the scenes by influencing Tamaki and their guests. He is generally irritable and slow to wake up in the morning, attributed to his low blood pressure. He always carries various memo-keeping devices (e.g., a black notebook, a clipboard, a pocket-folio with tablet, or an era-appropriate book when in period costume). He keeps extensive dossiers on every student at the school. Kyoya is immediately aware that Haruhi is a girl upon her entrance to the third music room through such research. He carefully calculates his actions in order to receive benefit from everything he does. Yet, despite his occasionally antagonistic traits, such as his subtle threats, withholding information, and elegant revenge schemes for petty slights, the Host Club would not have been successful without Kyoya's resourcefulness and marketing. Although he is rarely seen entertaining guests of the Host Club, preferring to taking notes on meeting events, he has his admirers and is considered the cool "glasses" type.

Kyoya lives with his father, a wealthy and mighty zaibatsu owner specializing in hospital management. Originally, Kyoya is raised to remain in the defined role as the youngest child of four, meant to support his older brothers and family name and not be ambitious or aim to become the family head. Under Tamaki's influence, Kyoya breaks from this role and shows his genuine potential. Despite his detached exterior, Kyoya (like all the hosts) is concerned about others, though it is often demonstrated in ways contrary and atypical. For example, when the Club goes to the beach, and Haruhi confronts two thugs and is tossed into the sea, Kyoya later threatens Haruhi in an attempt to make her wary of facing those larger and stronger than herself so the incident won't be repeated and she will be safe. Another example is when he and Haruhi are shopping together at a mall, and he points out the false nature of an antique to an older woman who is about to buy it. Like Tamaki, Haruhi can see through his mask and, after that, better understands his nature.

Kyoya, unlike the rest of the Host Club, stays in the United States after their joint year in Boston. He is only mentioned in the July 2011 omake because of his university studies there and only makes a cameo appearance in the August 2011 omake. In Volume 18, Hatori declines to confirm whether he is named heir to the Ootori zaibatsu or not. As for his romantic future, she writes that he will marry someone that brings merit to the Ootori family, although she doesn't discount the possibility that love would be involved in said choice. It is also mentioned that he owns a cat named Noir, which is very attached to him. It is said that Tamaki periodically receives emails with only photos of Noir and that he makes an effort to meet up with Kyoya when he is visiting the United States. Tamaki and the twins miss Kyoya to the point of convincing themselves that the lookalike ghost of an Ootori ancestor is Kyoya's "living ghost."

According to the author, if she had allotted forty pages for the first chapter of the manga instead of fifty, she would have cut Kyoya from the cast, but is glad this did not happen as "since the rest of the members are the way they are, he is invaluable for maintaining order and offering explanations." Bisco named him after the fact he wears glasses by taking the last syllable of gankyō, meaning a pair of glasses.

Viz Media romanized his name as Kyoya Otori, Chuang Yi as Kyoya Otori, FUNimation as Kyoya Otori, and Nippon Television's Japanese-language website as Kyoya Ootori.

Voiced by: Masaya Matsukaze (anime), Junichi Suwabe (drama CDs), J. Michael Tatum (English)
Portrayed by: Shunsuke Daito, Masamichi Satonaka (musical)

=== Hikaru and Kaoru Hitachiin ===
The twins, Hikaru Hitachiin (常陸院 光, Hitachiin Hikaru) and Kaoru Hitachiin (常陸院 馨, Hitachiin Kaoru), are depicted as mischievous, devious, and otherwise childish young men who toy with people, including their schoolmates. They are 15 years old at the beginning of the series.

When Hikaru and Kaoru are young, they are fond of a particular maid. One night, they discover her trying to steal from their mansion and offer her a deal. She must guess who is who in exchange for the combination to the family safe. When she can't win the game, they hide the slip of paper with the combination in their piggy bank. However, the maid breaks their trust along with the bank, taking the combination, and the family jewels while they're asleep. They awaken to find her escaping down a rope ladder along the side of the house, and when they ask her why she broke her promise to them, she says it's because no one will ever be able to tell them apart. From that point on, they deceive others in varied ways and expect to be deceived in return.

Before joining the Host club, Kaoru and Hikaru trust only one another, seeking no other friends. In the "Which one is Hikaru Game?" they admit that sometimes they want to be told apart and sometimes don't. Their personalities are quite different, Kaoru being the more sensible twin.

During their second year of middle school, they meet Tamaki Suoh, who invites them to join the newly formed Host Club. The twins agree to enter only if Tamaki can guess which twin is which. Tamaki fails many times but eventually guesses correctly, forcing the twins to join only out of curiosity about this strange boy. The club opens them up to new experiences, including the development of a deep bond with Tamaki. Describing the world as "us" and "them," the twins' general distrust of others and the world, in general, is further dissolved when Haruhi joins the club and with her unique ability to tell the twins apart immediately and always, she helps them become more independent of each other and more trusting of others.

The Hitachiin twins use an act of "forbidden brotherly love" as their main draw in the Host Club. Although they are considered mischievous, they have their differences: Kaoru is more agreeable, more mature, and considerate of others, while Hikaru is more immature though he is the older twin. Their different personalities are best shown when they are separated, and they also speak a little differently. Hikaru has a deeper voice and tends to speak first, while Kaoru has a higher voice and tends to speak second. There are several ways how to tell the twins apart: Hikaru's hair is parted to the left if you stand where he stands but right from your perspective, and Kaoru's hair parts to the right but looks like the left from your perspective; Hikaru tends to stand on the left and Kaoru on the Right. Both have a crush on Haruhi in the manga and are quite protective of her. Kaoru confesses to Haruhi but soon adds that Hikaru is more important to him, putting his feelings aside to support Hikaru's feelings for her. Hikaru's feelings for her are quite strong, but he only realizes it later. In the anime, however, it was only implied that Hikaru had a crush on Haruhi. However, in the anime, Kaoru was the one who asked Haruhi out on a date, then faked a cold so Hikaru could go in his place so Hikaru and Haruhi could bond further.

The twins live with their mother, Yuzuha, a fashion designer, and their considerably meek father, a computer software designer, until the final manga chapter. They and the other Host Club members move to America to study with Haruhi.

In the volume 18 extras, they are shown at college-age with their younger sister, Ageha, born after the end of the series. She likes butterflies and flowers but has a personality much like her older brothers. She is attached to Tamaki, referring to him as "milord" or "boss," just like Hikaru and Kaoru. The twins dote on her. The twins attend a college or university that is not Ouran University since Ouran does not have a fine arts faculty.

Hikaru voiced by: Kenichi Suzumura (Japanese anime and later drama CDs), Soichiro Hoshi (early drama CDs), Todd Haberkorn (English)
Kaoru voiced by: Yoshinori Fujita (Japanese anime and later drama CDs), Kenichi Suzumura (early drama CDs), Greg Ayres (English)
Portrayed by: Shinpei Takagi (Hikaru), Manpei Takagi (Kaoru), Yū Futaba (Hikaru, musical), Kaname Futaba (Kaoru, musical)

=== Mitsukuni "Honey" Haninozuka ===
Mitsukuni Haninozuka (埴之塚 光邦, Haninozuka Mitsukuni) is a 3rd-year high school student but appears to be younger due to his small stature. Honey is depicted as a childish and a desserts-loving boy who is much older than his elementary school appearance indicates. He is also an expert martial artist from a famous martial arts family. When Haruhi is warned about his legendary skills, the point is illustrated in the anime by a mushroom cloud erupting where a city once stood. In the anime, there is a scene that shows Honey's real strength, and it is said that Japan's Defense Minister has requested he never reveal his full potential, for fear that other nations might suspect that Japan holds a weapon of mass destruction, causing them to fire missiles upon that nation. Honey is often seen around his cousin Mori, with whom he is very close. He lives with his father, the owner of a famous dojo, and his little brother Yasuchika, with whom he is often at odds.

Honey is very fond of sweets and stuffed animals. He always carries around his favorite plush bunny named Usa-chan, an abbreviation of usagi, which means rabbit (also called Bun-Bun in the manga). He once tried to hide his true nature by acting like a "real man," but after Tamaki convinced him that true courage meant being exactly who you are, he stopped pretending. Together with Mori, he joined the Host Club, attracting customers with his shotacon cuteness. It's possible that his romanized nickname, Honey, is an adaptation of his first name, Mitsukuni (光邦), as mitsu can mean honey (蜜). It could also be an abbreviation of his family name, Haninozuka. He is referred to almost exclusively by this nickname, Mori being the only one who fully calls him by his given name. He is also known as Hunny in the manga or Hani. He often refers to his kohais with the -chan honorific (e.g., "Haru-chan" and "Tama-chan").

In Chapter 72 of the manga, he graduates from Ouran but says he will return to the Host Club every so often, as does Mori. They often return for visits and a picnic planned by Haruhi. He and Mori also fetch Tamaki for the reunion plan with his mother. In Volume 18 of the manga, he is seen dating and marrying Reiko Kanazuki and is the first of the Host Club members to marry. Their marriage is confirmed in the August 2011 omake, set two years after Chapter 83. In the July 2011 omake, it is confirmed that he is a third-year engineering student at Ouran University.

Honey, like Kyoya, has a difficult time waking up. Despite his cute nature, he wakes up in the same manner as Kyoya. However, he is much quicker when dealing with the person that wakes him up, as seen in the example of the U.S. platoon soldier who did so when the Haninozuka family visited America. He was initially intended to have an extreme dual personality; however, the "crouching in the corner, depressed" stance was reassigned from him to Tamaki.

Voiced by: Ayaka Saitō (anime and later drama CDs), Ikue Ōtani (early drama CDs), Luci Christian (English)
Portrayed by: Yudai Chiba, Eito Konishi (first musical), Ginga Shitara (second and third musical)

=== Takashi "Mori" Morinozuka ===
Takashi Morinozuka (銛之塚 崇, Morinozuka Takashi), usually called Mori (モリ), is a third year student at Ouran Academy. He is 17 years old at the beginning of the series. Mori is depicted as tall, quiet, and somewhat intimidating, but very protective of his cousin Honey, whom he fully calls by his first name, Mitsukuni. This is seen in the anime and manga when Honey has a toothache (anime: episode 12, manga: chapter 14). Mori blames himself for failing to remind Honey to brush his teeth after eating and restricts his cousin from eating sweets until he has a filling done. Honey judo-throws Mori to the floor in a fit of anger, but they soon make amends. It is learned that the Morinozuka family has protected and served the Haninozuka family for many generations but were joined by marriage two generations back, thus breaking the master-servant tradition.

Nevertheless, Mori still faithfully protects Honey and is always by his side, attending to his wishes, and watching out for him. His protective personality extends to his classmates and the Host Club members, earning him a high respect level. He is also protective of Haruhi, as shown in episode 7, of whom he thinks in a very kind, brotherly way. As a host, he is considered the wild type (changed into the strong, silent type in the anime's English dub) and usually does not try to woo girls. The girls like how he cares for Honey, and shyer customers are attracted to his tall physique and taciturn personality. He has an outgoing little brother, Satoshi Morinozuka, who only appears in the manga.

Mori's hobbies include kendo, of which he is the national champion. In the manga, he becomes uncharacteristically talkative and flirtatious when tired. In the later chapters, he raises a chick who he names Piyo and takes in a stray tanuki, who he names Pome. He is also depicted as having a natural ability to tame animals, as shown in a few later chapters. He easily tames two Doberman guard dogs at the Suoh residence and can summon a flock of doves in the amusement park.

In chapter 72, he graduates from Ouran, deciding to study Theory and Philosophy of Law (or Jurisprudence). However, he is leaving for the university section, Honey and Mori state that they will often visit the Host Club. He maintains a close relationship with the Host Club members even in the future, especially with Tamaki and Haruhi, being the first to congratulate them when they have children and visits often. The author states that despite having the quality of an old-fashioned, cool-looking Japanese man, Mori is very loving and devoted to his future wife and children.

Voiced by: Daisuke Kirii (Japanese anime and later drama CDs), Kenjirō Tsuda (early drama CDs), Travis Willingham (English)
Portrayed by: Masaya Nakamura, Shō Katō (first musical), Shogo Tazuru (second and third musical)

== Supporting characters ==
=== Host Club associates and customers ===
==== Renge Houshakuji ====
Anime screenshot depicting Renge.

Renge Houshakuji (宝積寺 れんげ, Hōshakuji Renge) is the Host Club's self-proclaimed manager who tends to be incredibly loud and outspoken. She lives in France before attending Ouran and comes to the Host Club stating that she is Kyoya's fiancée despite never meeting him in person. Her fascination with Kyoya originates from her obsession with a dating-sim game whose lead character, Ichigo Miyabi, resembles Kyoya. Tamaki initially hopes Renge will become a feminizing influence on Haruhi but regrets his choice when Renge develops a crush on her, believing Haruhi to be a boy. Renge's expertise with dating sims makes her keenly aware of the tropes and conventions of shojou manga, which Tamaki eventually sees as useful to the Host Club; ergo, he makes her self-proclamation as their manager a genuine position. As such, Renge proves her worth on several occasions with her ability to predict what will win the most significant approval of the Host Club's customers based on her extensive knowledge on subjects connected to the concept of moe. Kyoya compliments her on several occasions, and she is shown to be savvy in media production and broadcasting.

Renge is also shown to have talents outside of the Host Club: in the anime, she is shown hosting a sentai show for school children, and she is involved in producing the Moe Moe Ouran Journal (萌え萌え桜蘭日記, Moe Moe Ōran Nikki), a school magazine containing all things related to moe at Ouran Academy. Her catchphrase, "I could eat three bowls of rice," is a reference to the anime Green Green. In the manga, Renge mostly disappears after her initial appearance in chapter 3, making only cameo appearances in subsequent chapters. Hatori mentioned that Renge was going to be a recurring character. Still, it never happened. Her comment probably led to Renge's numerous anime appearances in situations that initially included Tamaki in the manga, like the coaching of Shiro and Nekozawa. In volume 9, Renge significantly increased her appearances, and she appears in the later chapters to help the club. In the July 2011 special chapter, she is seen as a first-year business student at Ouran University, speculating on Mei's and Kasanoda's possible romantic relationship in dramatic terms.

A trait that Renge displays in both the anime and manga is that, when she becomes furious, she assumes a Medusa-like look, with her hair transforming into snakes. At such times, she can drive most of the other characters before her to blind panic. Her primary running gag in the anime is her dramatic entrance, in which she rises from beneath the floor on a motorized rig (which has miraculously been installed wherever the host club happens to be), accompanied by dramatic music from "Swan Lake." She is presented as an undersocialized otaku.

Voiced by: Kozue Yoshizumi (Japanese); Monica Rial (English)
Portrayed by: Tao Tsuchiya, Mizuki Saito (musical)

==== Umehito Nekozawa ====
Umehito Nekozawa (猫澤 梅人, Nekozawa Umehito) is depicted as a hooded individual who holds a cat puppet named Belzeneff (also spelled Beelzenef or Bereznoff). Umehito has photophobia, which causes him to collapse and, according to him, die when under any kind of direct light; he tends to refer to anyone who drags him into lights as "murderers." As the Black Magic Club's President, he tries to get people to join his club, though not too successfully. Anyone who enters receives a free Belzeneff doll. Besides his puppet, Umehito also has a wooden voodoo doll version of it. Nekozawa claims that if the name of a hated person is written on the back of the doll, that person will be showered with misfortunes. Tamaki, especially, is superstitious about Nekozawa's curses, having "experienced" them first-hand. In the anime, Umehito usually speaks to the host club through an ornate, candlelit black door, which seems only to be present when Umehito is.

Umehito is very handsome under his hood. He has bright blue eyes and wears a black – dark green in the anime – wig over his naturally blond hair to keep his hair from exposure to the light. He has a younger sister named Kirimi, who is afraid of the dark and is under the impression that he is a monster due to his dark clothing. As a result, the two siblings cannot be around one another until Tamaki and the Host Club get involved and prompt Umehito to adjust to light and display his more heroic and princely side. In the end, it is Umehito's love and desire to protect his little sister that endears him to her, as he braves daylight to save Kirimi. He collapses right after exposing himself to sunshine, but Kirimi finds him a place in her heart for his willingness to brave what he loathes so much to protect her. At the end of volume 8 of the manga, it is shown that Kirimi has turned into a nearly identical darkness fanatic. Both sport dark cloaks and have their features covered, but Kirimi carries a giant plush kitty instead of a Beelzeneff puppet. Despite the Host Club's efforts to help him brave the sun, he is still just as obsessed with his occult passions. In the Halloween episode, he appears before Tamaki from a coffin and offers his services to scare the student body.

In Volume 3 of the manga, the Host Club stays at Umehito's private beach and mansion, not Kyoya's. However, Umehito does not attend dinner because Haruhi switched the lights on and shocking him. The Host Club – Mori, Honey, the twins, and Haruhi –also see Umehito without his cloak and wig for the first time as he comes out to see what is wrong when Haruhi is taken to the bathroom. It is unclear if he realizes that Haruhi is a girl. It is possible he knows her secret and does not care, as she spent the whole vacation in a dress instead of her typical boyish clothes.

In the volume 18 extras, he is seen as a college student, hugging Kirimi, an elementary school student; she is attempting to put his wig on his head, and Hatori noted that they still got along very well. He is also seen briefly in the August 2011 special chapter, terrifying Tamaki with spooky stories.

The Nekozawa family traces their heritage to the Tokarev Dynasty in Russia, suggesting that the Nekozawa family may work with gun manufacturing companies (a firearm appears in the manga, and as a symbol in the anime).

Voiced by: Yuji Ueda (Japanese); Patrick Seitz (English)
Portrayed by: Ryo Ryusei, Shoichiro Oomi (musical)

==== Ritsu Kasanoda ====
Ritsu Kasanoda (笠野田 律, Kasanoda Ritsu) is the successor to the third generation master of the Kasanoda family, the most powerful yakuza group in Kantō, Japan. Since Kasanoda's features have been intimidating since birth, his father claims he has the right face to become the most frightening yakuza boss in history and raises him to be the next leader. He is trained to appear harsh and unapproachable, so most see him as a very intimidating person and he has few friends. Kasanoda, therefore, initially does not talk much, though he can be angered easily. He is most well known for his long red hair and frightening face. Despite his outward appearance and upbringing, however, he tends to be a kind person who enjoys helping others. His classmates have nicknamed him the feared "human blizzard". Haruhi calls him "Casanova" while Tamaki and the Hitachiin twins call him "Bossa Nova."

Kasanoda initially seeks to apprentice under Morinozuka, hoping to become as respected and admired as he. He suffers humiliation at the hands of the Host Club members out of a desire to learn how to make friends and have fun with people. Later experiences concerning a member of his household named Tetsuya show him that there are already people at his home who know his good side; they do not mention it because they know he is kind-hearted and shy and easily embarrassed.

Due to Kasanoda's habit of not knocking before entering a room, he becomes the first person at Ouran High outside the Host Club to discover that Haruhi is a girl. He had a confused crush on her before learning she is a girl and consequently falls in love with Haruhi and attends the Host Club as a customer. When he tries to admit his feelings to Haruhi, he is rejected with no ill intent. She considers him an understanding friend (due to Kasanoda saying she could be at ease because he had come to see her, so Haruhi could talk to someone who knew her secret). Since Kyoya tells Kasanoda that Haruhi must appear to be male for "special reasons," he resolves to not cause her any trouble by publicly stating they will be "friends" forever so she will not have to worry about being thought odd by associating romantically with him. Kasanoda does not realize that the particular reasons consist of Haruhi's debt to the club.

Ever since that incident, though, his desire to have friends is fulfilled when everyone in the Host Club, hosts and customers, agrees to become his friends. He joins the Gardening Society of the school and gifts Haruhi with food he has grown on multiple occasions. In episode 25 of the anime, he is seen surrounded by female students, apparently embarrassed but not angry. He appears in numerous chapters helping the Host Club. In chapter 80 of the manga, Kyoya used both the police and Kasanoda's clan to secure a route to the airport so that Tamaki could arrive on time to meet his mother.

In the volume 18 extras, Kasanoda is shown at the beginning of his romantic relationship with Mei Yasumura, who is informing him (to his astonishment) that Haruhi is pregnant and commanding him to knit something for the baby; his friend Tetsuya Sendo can be seen in the background, cheering him on and voicing his approval of Mei.

A special chapter released in July 2011 in Lala revealed how he met Mei. When he is a first-year undergraduate business student at Ouran University, the twins send Kasanoda to Mei as a replacement model for her fashion show (they were initially the ones who were going to model). They eventually become friends, despite his being initially intimidated by her audacity and argumentative nature (he comments that she seems more like a yakuza than he does, at least in her use of profanity), what he sees as her excessive amounts of makeup, and her style of dressing. She even encourages him at one point to make a move on Haruhi (whom she knows he still has a crush on) while Tamaki is in the United States by showing her his carpentry skills; her reason for doing so is that she feels that he should learn to be confident in himself and what he does. However, she needs him and needs his help, which eventually appeals to him the most, although no romantic relationship is formed at the time. It is implied that it takes a few years for them to finally date, since their entry-level occupations (Mei is a rookie designer, Kasanoda, a florist), rather than their student statuses listed in volume 18 extra about their futures. In volume 18 extra, it is also noted that Kasanoda eventually becomes the manager of a flower shop and the head of the Kasanoda family.

Voiced by: Wataru Hatano (Japanese); Christopher Sabat and Colleen Clinkenbeard (Young Kasonoda) (English)

==== Seika Ayanokoji ====
Seika Ayanokoji (綾小路, Seika Ayanokōji) is a student of Class 3-A (and thus Honey and Mori's classmate) who only appears as a minor antagonist in the first chapter of the series. Arrogant and selfish, she is a regular at the Host Club and enjoys getting all six boys' attention. However, this is cut short when Haruhi, as the newest seventh member, becomes the center of attention, even before her revelation as a girl. Ayanokoji degrades Haruhi and throws away her book bag with her wallet in it, which ends up in the fountain in front of the academy. When the Host Club boys learn about this, all six of them ban her from ever stepping inside the Host Club for having insulted one of their own, causing her to run away.

In the live-action TV adaptation, instead of running away dishonorably after her plan is discovered, Ayanokoji is touched by Haruhi's decision to forgive her enough to donate food for the Host Club. The Club boys likewise allow her to keep receiving their services. In the last episode, she also appears to help lift the mood for the Club's second anniversary and convince Shizue Suou that the Club is not a mere "playground."

Voiced by: Michiko Neya (Japanese); Leah Clark (English)
Portrayed by: Ai Okawa

==== Kanako Kasugazaki ====
Kanako Kasugazaki (春日崎 奏子, Kasugazaki Kanako) is the subject of help for the Host Club in episode two of the anime. Initially, Kanako was well known for host-hopping (changing hosts often; the usual practice being for a girl to designate a permanent host). Still, she only did this to spite her fiancé, Tohru Suzushima, into paying attention to her. She was unsuccessful until Tamaki learns of their situation and decides to help. She makes a cameo appearance in episode 13 as the dodo from Alice in Wonderland and is seen waiting for her lost love to come back. In the anime, she is the first person Haruhi ever kisses, by accident, during a ball organized by the Host Club where they executed Tamaki's plan to bring Kanako and Tohru together. She appears in later chapters stating that Tohru is working hard in England and wishing to help Tamaki.

Voiced by: Natsuko Kuwatani (Japanese); Laura Bailey (English)

==== Shirō Takaoji ====
Shirō Takaoji (鷹凰子嗣郎, Takaoji Shirō) is the subject of help for the Host Club in episode 6 of the anime. He is a painfully honest person, first pointing out that one of Tamaki's clients looks like a carp (her lips are thick), next stating that the twins are incestuous, and finally that Haruhi is a cross-dresser. He is in love with a girl in his grade who is moving away and asks to be taught how to make women happy; in his music class, he is supposed to play a duet with the girl he likes but prefers just to hear her play. Tamaki teaches him the song to play together, and the young lovebirds end up corresponding through the mail. In the manga, he is later "loaned" to Kasanoda to make him cuter. He made a cameo appearance in episode 13 as a mouse and appears in the later chapters of the manga complaining that Tamaki had yet to take him to an amusement park. At the end of episode 6, Shirō's pose is a nod to his voice actor's more famous role as the titular character in Naruto.

Voiced by: Junko Takeuchi (Japanese); Brina Palencia (English)

==== Ayame Jōnōchi ====
Ayame Jōnōchi (城之内綾女, Jōnōchi Ayame) is Kyōya's and Tamaki's classmate and the class vice-chairman of 2-A. Ayame becomes Haruhi's tutor when Haruhi fails to rank at the top of her grade. Despite hating Tamaki for his eccentricities and the fact that he is always second in class (Ayame being consistently third after Tamaki comes to Ouran), she has a crush on the Host Club President. Initially, she permed her hair straight, but after Tamaki's advice, she reverted to her natural wavy hairstyle and became a regular at the Host Club. She is known for her ability to speak for a long time in a single breath; as such, her nickname among the club members is "Morse Code Lady." In the anime, her appearances are limited to a cameo in episode 24, when Tamaki introduces himself to her. In the live-action series, in place of Kanako, she is the girl who receives a kiss from Haruhi at the ball.

Portrayed by: Aoi Nakabeppu

==== Michelle of Monale ====
Michelle (ミシェル, Misheru), the princess of a fictional European country of Monaru, gives an official visit to Ouran Academy in place of her older brother, Laurence. Tamaki is willing to serve her lavishly, in part due to her supposed resemblance to his mother. Michelle, who is spoiled, exploits this and orders him and the rest of the Host Club to treat and respect her with various gifts and other amenities. Eventually, it is revealed that she did not come to Japan due to an official visit; instead, she runs away from home in protest of her brother neglecting to care for her as a sister due to his busy schedule in running the country. Tamaki, who already knew this from the start, advises her to understand her brother's situation and not be a selfish individual. When Laurence convinces Michelle to come back, she realizes that he cares for her and returns to Monaru.

Michelle's story arc from the manga is the focal point of the series' 2012 live-action film. She also becomes more sympathetic in that her reasons for coming to Japan is not just to attract attention from her brother, but also to raise the prestige of the Monaru family (which in the film is based in Singapore, instead of Europe), who has fallen on hard times, by creating a partnership with the Suou family.

Portrayed by: Mariko Shinoda

==== Reiko Kanazuki ====
Reiko Kanazuki (伽名月 麗子, Kanazuki Reiko) is a student of Class 1-D and the only female member of the Black Magic Club, headed by Nekozawa. She has no friends apart from her fellow Black Magic Club members and is very quiet and discreet. She claims to have practiced many curses, including one that can make someone fall in love. As she gets to know the Host Club members better, Reiko begins to romantically attach herself with Honey, who is two years her senior. She is also one of the Host Club associates who help Tamaki reunite in time with his mother, Anne-Sophie, by convincing Tamaki's father, Yuzuru, to agree on Nekozawa's plan in faking a stomachache to stall Anne-Sophie from boarding the plane. Chapters published post-epilogue show that Reiko does indeed marry Honey in the future.

In the live-action TV adaptation, Reiko's portrayal is a composite of her original role in the manga and Nekozawa's family maid, who personally cares for Umehito's little sister, Kirimi.

Portrayed by: Hana Sugisaki

==== Megumi Kanoya ====
Megumi Kanoya (鹿谷 愛, Kanoya Megumi) is a girl who transfers from Aoizuka School in Kobe to Ouran Academy around the time of New Year. She is estranged from her father, who owns restaurants in the Kansai region. Megumi crosses paths with the Host Club during a horse-riding event in which a wild horse would have hit Megumi had Tamaki not help her. The event makes the two grow closer, and Megumi becomes a love rival to Haruhi. This is not helped by the fact that Tamaki, who has grown depressed after he nearly lost Haruhi in a kidnapping, gradually drifts apart from the rest of the Host Club in favor of Megumi and even tells Haruhi that they do not seem to have anything in common, while he and Megumi do. Haruhi and the Host Club organize an event for the two to measure their relationship. In the end, they conclude that Tamaki is just masking his true self, with Haruhi scolding Tamaki to stop doing it since he would destroy himself if he does so. Tamaki then reveals that he is never attracted to Megumi and was just searching for temporary solace. Simultaneously, Megumi admits to Haruhi that she also did the same to escape from her familial problems, which are quickly resolved when Megumi is called back to reconcile with her father. However, Haruhi tells Megumi that the latter did fall in love genuinely with Tamaki for a while and made her jealous.

=== Zuka Club members ===
==== Benio Amakusa ====
Benio Amakusa (天草紅緒, Amakusa Benio) is the President of the Zuka Club. She is nicknamed "Benibara-sama" at St. Lobelia's Girl Academy and is the most popular of the Zuka Club's ruling council. Benio is also known as "The Lady of the Crimson Rose" and is the anime's first openly homosexual female to be introduced. She is the only character who recognizes Haruhi's gender, despite her androgynous appearance, upon meeting her. A "Benibara-sama's guardian club" exists at St. Lobelia's just to ensure she isn't mobbed when walking around campus. She has a large fan club devoted to her, as she flirts with girls with the same ease as Tamaki, with whom she shares personality traits such as over-confidence and dramatic nature. On one occasion, Benio claims that she is following in the footsteps of her mother, who was supposedly a past president of the Zuka Club in her day. In the manga, it is revealed to be a ruse to show the foolishness of men. She refers to herself with the Japanese first-person pronoun boku, which is used predominantly by males, although females increase usage.

Voiced by: Mitsuki Saiga (Japanese); Callie McHalen (English)

==== Chizuru Maihara ====
Chizuru Maihara (舞原千鶴, Maihara Chizuru), also known as "The Lady of the Lily," is the Vice-President of the Zuka Club. She appears to be the calmest member of the club's ruling council, but she never objects to any of the club's plans, instead of assisting and making things worse. Chizuru believes that all men are a lower form of life and finds the Host Club's bewilderment at her immunity to their charms amusing.

Voiced by: Miho Yamada (Japanese); Jamie Marchi (English)

==== Hinako Tsuwabuki ====
The youngest member of the Zuka Club's leading council, Hinako Tsuwabuki (石蕗雛子, Tsuwabuki Hinako), also known as "The Lady of the Daisy," is in her first year of high school at Lobelia Girls' Academy. She is the most energetic of the three girls and, as acknowledged by Chizuru, seems to be very intelligent. Her club tends to bother Haruhi, thinking that she should not wear a boy's uniform, and insist that Haruhi join the Zuka Club.

Voiced by: Yuko Sasamoto (Japanese); Brittney Karbowski (English)

=== Recurring characters ===
==== Ryoji "Ranka" Fujioka ====
Anime screenshot depicting "Ranka."

Ryōji Fujioka (藤岡 涼二, Fujioka Ryōji), Haruhi's father, works at a cross-dressing bar (okama) under the name Ranka (蘭花). He identifies as bisexual, although he said he could never love another woman after his wife's death. In the American dub, his sexual orientation is never stated, but he says that Haruhi's mother did not care that he was a cross-dresser and she was the only one that mattered. In contrast to Haruhi's practicality and lack of interest in material things, he is terrible with money and buys girly clothing for Haruhi, hoping she will dress more cutely. He repacks her suitcase for an overnight trip in episode 8 of the anime, replacing the clothes she had packed with a dress.

Haruhi's stubborn self-reliance causes her father to worry about her a lot; he wants to be more involved in her life and do more for her, but she rarely lets him. However, the two have a loving relationship. While her father would like to be able to take care of Haruhi, it seems that she often has to take care of him instead, as shown in a flashback in which a very young Haruhi refuses to allow him to go to parents' day at her school because she wants him to stay home and rest.

There is a marked similarity between Haruhi's father and Tamaki, upon which several other members of the Host Club have commented. Because of this, and as a result of Tamaki's romantic affection for Haruhi, Ryōuji has stated that he considers Tamaki an enemy and seems to take amusement in picking on him. In volume 18 extra about his future and that of Tamaki's parents, he is seen about to dump a vat of water on Tamaki's head, having been informed by Anne-Sophie that Tamaki was planning to ask for his permission to marry Haruhi. Hatori also noted in the extra that Ryōuji and Tamaki's parents got along very well; she meant to include their relationship in one of the Boston chapters, but the short comic included in the extra seems to take place between the events of the July and August 2011 Lala special chapters, since Haruhi and Tamaki are not engaged in the July 2011 special.

In one of the later extra chapters of the manga, it is shown that Ryōji was very protective of his wife before they started dating, to the point that he quit his job at that time to make sure she was always safe, and he found her to be a very "cool" person. He is described by some of the characters in the anime and manga as prettier than Haruhi, even when she is wearing a dress.

Voiced by: Takehito Koyasu (Japanese); Mike McFarland (English)
Portrayed by: Shigeyuki Totsugi, Kohei Norizuki

==== Kotoko Fujioka ====
Kotoko Fujioka (藤岡 琴子, Fujioka Kotoko) was Haruhi's mother, who died when her daughter was approximately five years old, as deduced from Haruhi's statement in the first episode that it had been ten years since her mother died. Kotoko was an attorney at law and remains Haruhi's primary role model in life. If how Haruhi recalls her in her memories and dreams is accurate, she was a dedicated and loving mother who wished her family the best. One can assume she was also open-minded to live with and love her husband, Ryoji (aka "Ranka"), not only because of his bisexuality but also because he was six years younger than her. Ryoji states that Kotoko was both beautiful, intelligent, and a closet fan of St. Lobelia's Zuka Club of her day. In later chapters, it is shown that she was popular at law school and, in a later omake, that while she found Ryoji to be strange and annoying, she liked him from the first moment they met as she saw him cute, a trait to which she was vulnerable.

Voiced by: Mika Doi (Japanese); Jennifer Seman (English)
Portrayed by: Ami Suzuki

==== Yuzuru Suoh ====
Yuzuru Suoh (須王 譲, Suō Yuzuru) is the patriarch of the Suoh family and chairman of Ouran Academy. He is the 48-year-old father of Tamaki, and his hobbies are golf, theater, and teasing his son. Despite knowing of his mother, Shizue's loathing of Tamaki, he can do little to help the situation. He does rebel against his mother's wishes several times though, first when he divorced the woman his mother had chosen for him in favor of retaining his relationship with Tamaki's mother, Anne-Sophie, and also when he and Kyoya's father, Yoshio, fire Shizue from her position as head of the Suoh family, which sends her into a depression. Yuzuru shares some of his son's characteristics, including a strange way of thinking, playfulness, a penchant for concocting bizarre plans that work, and a tendency to sit in a corner whenever he is kicked out or made fun of. He is very interested in his son's activities and becomes sad when Tamaki does not want to go along with it. What the father had in mind was to have Tamaki surpass him in terms of capabilities to inherit the Suoh empire and force his grandmother to accept his mother.

After her son manages to reunite with his mother after years, Yuzuru meets with Shizue at the Suoh mansion at the end of the series, the two beginning to mend their broken relationship. He agrees to his mother's comments of Haruhi being a wonderful girl after she surprises them by criticizing their lack of communication with each other. In the volume 18 extras, he is seen in one extra sitting around a kotatsu with Tamaki, Anne-Sophie, and Shizue, discussing getting a kotatsu large enough to accommodate Haruhi and Ryoji, while another extra has him discussing Tamaki and Haruhi's forthcoming marriage with Anne-Sophie, Ryoji, and Shizue.

In the anime, Yuzuru's personality is quite different since his real character had not been revealed when the anime aired. He is cold and mean to Tamaki and does not seem to accept him as a school student. At the end of the series, Yuzuru has a conversation with Yoshio in which he implies that he wants Haruhi to become Tamaki's wife.

Voiced by: Kazuhiko Inoue (Japanese); John Swasey (English)
Portrayed by: Takeshi Masu

==== Anne-Sophie de Grantaine ====
Anne-Sophie de Grantaine (アンヌ＝ソフィー・ド・グランテーヌ, Anne-Sofī do Gurantēnu) is Tamaki's mother. She has blonde hair and violet eyes, traits that her son inherited, and a fondness for many things that Tamaki also has, including piano and an obsession with kotatsu. Anne-Sophie was born in France and met Yuzuru Suoh, Tamaki's father, in Paris while on a business trip. The two fell in love, and she became his mistress. When Tamaki was born, she was forbidden by Yuzuru's mother to return to Japan with him. Anne-Sophie raised Tamaki in France until he was fourteen, about three years before the series's start. Anne-Sophie is often very sick. At the time, Yuzuru's mother was worried that the Suoh family would be without an heir and offered Anne-Sophie money to allow Tamaki to live in Japan, never to see his mother again. Faced with her family's business's failure and debt, Anne-Sophie tearfully accepted, going into hiding after Tamaki's departure. No one knows where she is, though Yuzuru has some idea. During the second-year-of-school trip to France, Kyoya discovers that she is living quite healthily, thinking of her son every day. In chapter 77, they find out that Anne-Sophie suffers from systemic lupus erythematosus.

She has finally reunited with Tamaki thanks to his friends who helped him get to the airport in time for her departure after a brief visit to Japan. Although she returns to France, she is no longer forbidden from seeing Tamaki. In the volume 18 extras, she lives in Japan, with Tamaki managing to get her and his father and grandmother to sit in a kotatsu as he has dreamed since he was young. She is also later seen with her husband, mother-in-law, and Haruhi's father, Ryoji, discussing Tamaki and Haruhi's impending marriage.

In the anime, Anne-Sophie's situation is somewhat different. She works as the housekeeper of the Tonerre family and knows the young heiress, Éclair. She tells young Éclair a lot about Tamaki, which makes the heiress curious about what kind of person he could be; and thus, she goes to Japan to visit him and tells him that if he marries her, she will make sure he is reunited with Anne-Sophie. In the end, the engagement is broken off, and Éclair deems Tamaki a fool, though she still plans for him to reunite with his mother.

In the live-action series, her ethnicity is French/Japanese.

Portrayed by: Naomi Zaizen

==== Shizue Suoh ====
Shizue Suoh (須王 静江, Suō Shizue) is Yuzuru's mother and Tamaki's grandmother who acts as the matriarch and head of the Suoh family. Introduced in the series as the main antagonist, she is responsible for bringing Tamaki to Japan and forbidding him from ever seeing his mother again. She is hateful and mean, being one of the only people Honey hates. She strongly dislikes Tamaki for being the child of her son's mistress and refers to him as a "filthy child." Strict and old fashioned, she puts the Suoh business before everything else. Throughout the series, Shizue also shows she has plans for Tamaki and the Host Club. Thanks to the Suoh's lawyer, Kousaka, Shizue finally allows Tamaki to enter the main residence, though she still does not acknowledge him. Once he is there, she tells him how he has messed up Haruhi Fujioka's life by making her hide her gender and deceive the whole school. She also forbids him from participating in Host Club activities, an order which Tamaki obeys.

As she starts living in the same residence as her grandson, Shizue is slowly charmed by his extravagant yet kind self. Yuzuru orders her retirement after his and Yoshio Ootori's companies discover medicine for Tamaki's mother, which causes her to seclude herself inside her room. Falling into depression, Tamaki helps her regain her spirit by playing the piano for her, leading to the discovery that they have a lot in common, such as the same interests in movies and TV series. After witnessing how far the Host Club goes to make Tamaki see his mother before she leaves, Shizue lets him go as long as he will come back to play the piano for her. After this, she also allows him to return to the Host Club and eventually accepts Tamaki's relationship with Haruhi. This is exemplified in chapter 82 when she forcefully has him dressed in her late husband's kimono, his "most formal attire" before Tamaki goes on a date with Haruhi.

Voiced by: Hisako Kyōda (Japanese); Judy Keith (English)
Portrayed by: Kyoko Enami

==== Yoshio Ootori ====
Yoshio Ootori (鳳 敬雄, Ōtori Yoshio), Kyoya's father, is the patriarch of the Ootori family. Yoshio is portrayed as a cold, calculating father. Kyōya tries hard to please him to become the family's heir, although his father shows no understanding for his children and has planned out his sons' lives as his successors already. In the manga, he acknowledges Kyoya as a possible successor despite being the third son. In the anime, he states he has already decided Kyoya would inherit Ootori Medical from him (in the manga, he says it is a possibility), only to have his third son buy it and return it to his control without ever revealing his identity. He also wants Haruhi to become Kyoya's wife, although, in the manga, they never cross paths with each other.

Voiced by: Fumihiko Tachiki (Japanese); Kent Williams (English)
Portrayed by: Akihiro Shimizu

==== Fuyumi Shido ====
Fuyumi Shidou (矢道 芙裕美, Shidō Fuyumi), maiden name Fuyumi Ootori (鳳 芙裕美, Ōtori Fuyumi) is Kyoya's older sister. She cares for her younger brother and tries to help him in life. She is somewhat lacking in the areas of housework and organization as any time she tries to help Kyoya packing clothes, they end up all over the place literally, but she appears to be a kind-hearted person. The manga reveals that she is married but returned home once in a while. She, like Tamaki, also has a thing for "commoner's food."

Voiced by: Kikuko Inoue (Japanese); Christine Auten (English)

==== Isao "Misuzu" Sonoda ====
Misuzu Sonoda (園田 美鈴, Sonoda Misuzu) is Ranka's colleague at the cross-dressing bar. He runs a pension in Karuizawa, Nagano, where Haruhi works during summer vacation. He holds a contest among the hosts over who will be the most refreshing and able to stay at the pension; Kaoru and Hikaru sway him after displaying "brotherly love" earns them "100 refreshing points". His real name is Isao (功). He was formerly a banker and had a love for making frilly Lolita-type clothing.

Voiced by: Yūichi Nagashima (Japanese); Sonny Strait (English)

==== Mei Yasumura ====
Mei Yasumura (安村 メイ, Yasumura Mei) is Misuzu Sonoda's ganguro daughter. She only appears in the manga. Mei hates her father for being a cross-dresser, as it was the reason her parents divorced and left her without a good father figure for most of her childhood. Yasumura is her stepfather's surname since Mei's custody was given to her mother after the divorce. Misuzu gets the Fujiokas to keep an eye on his daughter for a while, as she keeps running away from him and refuses to stay at his house. During her stay at the Fujiokas', Haruhi secretly prepares meals for Mei using Misuzu's recipes, such as jam and demiglace sauce, which Tamaki obtains from Misuzu by working part-time at the pension. Mei eventually sees through Tamaki's plan and reconciles with Misuzu by requesting some more of his cooking.

One of Mei's favorite hobbies is creating her fashions, and she loves seeing her clothes on other girls. Mei is so dedicated to this hobby that she is willing to wake up early in the morning to sew a new dress and sometimes gets so carried away that her homework is neglected. When she discovers that Hikaru and Kaoru's mother is the famous designer Yuzuha Hitachiin, Mei persuades Haruhi to accept an invite to the twins' mansion so Mei can meet her idol in person. Yuzuha lives up to Mei's expectations, and together they try to photograph Haruhi wearing cute outfits designed by Yuzuha.

From the moment she saw Tamaki, Mei develops a crush on him and enlists Haruhi's reluctant help to attract his attention. However, she moves out of it when she suspects that Tamaki might be in love with Haruhi and vice versa, and she is the first to notice Haruhi's feelings towards Tamaki. As they become better friends, Mei provides Haruhi with love advice, using a girls' magazine to help Haruhi understand her relationship with Tamaki; her assistance gives Tamaki an advantage over Hikaru in confessing his feelings to Haruhi.

In the chapters published post-epilogue, Mei begins to pursue a relationship with Kasanoda since their first meeting at a fashion show. The Hitachiin twins send Kasanoda as a replacement model for her. When she realizes that Kasanoda still has a crush on Haruhi, Mei advises him to grow closer with her by showing her his carpentry skills, but this ends up making the two attracted to each other instead.

==== Yasuchika Haninozuka ====
Yasuchika Haninozuka (埴之塚 靖睦, Haninozuka Yasuchika) is Honey's younger brother, whom Honey calls "Chika-chan." He often feels overshadowed by his older brother and has grown a lasting resentment towards him for enjoying things that are cute and dropping out as the Karate Club's President. He is also astonished by the amount of cake he eats in one night and how quickly he does so. Yasuchika's greatest ambition is to one day finally defeat his brother in combat. Still, in the end, Honey easily defeats him, choosing the things he loves most over his brother's feelings, much to Mori's surprise.

Yasuchika's best friend is Satoshi Morinozuka, Mori's younger brother, who also attends Ouran Middle School like himself. Both seem to be opposites of their older brothers. However, it is shown that underneath Yasuchika's attitude, he is much like Honey, crying easily and collecting cute stuffed toy chicks and chick photo books. In the chapters published post-epilogue, it is revealed that both Yasuchika and Satoshi attend Ouran Academy upon graduation, following their brothers' footsteps, and Satoshi lures Yasuchika to participate in the reformed Host Club, now Animal Husbandry Club, by promising him stuffed toys.

Voiced by: Kei Watanabe (Japanese); Aaron Dismuke (English)

==== Satoshi Morinozuka ====
Satoshi Morinozuka (銛之塚 悟, Morinozuka Satoshi) is Mori's younger brother. He is the captain of the Kendo Club and member of the Karate Club. He attends Ouran Middle School along with Yasuchika. Compared to Mori, Satoshi is talkative and cheerful. He takes his role as a Morinozuka seriously, going so far as to hit Yasuchika with a kendo stick when he is rude. During one of his visits to the Host Club, the twins add Tabasco sauce to Satoshi's tea, which he declares is delicious, leaving other characters to doubt that he has any taste buds. In contrast to Yasuchika's disdain for Honey, Satoshi adores his Mori and converts Mori's criticism into something reasonably positive. He does not appear in the anime and has only appeared briefly in one of the manga's later chapters.

In the volume 18 extras, it is revealed that Satoshi attempts to keep the Host Club going during the Hosts' year in Boston to preserve his brother's and Tamaki's legacy; to lure Yasuchika into helping him by promising toys. However, he then adds animals, and the Host Club morphs into an Animal Husbandry Club.

==== Yuzuha Hitachiin ====
Yuzuha Hitachiin (常陸院 柚葉, Hitachiin Yuzuha) is Hikaru and Kaoru's mother. Hitachiin is her maiden name; she does not change her surname as the Hitachiin carries a higher prestige than her husband, Hayato's (隼). She is a fashion designer who is famous throughout the world. Her sons' mischievous attitude seems to have been inherited from her, in contrast to Hayato's reserved and quiet personality. She eventually employs Mei Yasumura as an assistant fashion designer, a big fan of her, and shares a common fashion sense with her. Post-epilogue, Yuzuha is revealed to have given birth to a third child: a daughter named Ageha.

==== Kirimi Nekozawa ====
Kirimi Nekozawa (猫澤 霧美, Nekozawa Kirimi) is Umehito's little sister. She is three years old and has light blonde hair and blue eyes like her brother. As with the rest of the Nekozawa, Kirimi is descended from the Tokarev dynasty line in Russia, but unlike her brother, she does not inherit their family curse, that is, extreme sensitivity to light. She does, however, have fears of darkness and cats, both exact opposites of Umehito, which is troubling since the Nekozawa naturally attracts cats. Kirimi has never met Umehito due to her fear of darkness and his fear of light and only knows about his existence through stories told by her servants and a single portrait in her family mansion that depicts him in a knightly manner. Because of this, she mistakenly assumes Tamaki, who also has blonde hair, as her brother, and he decides to play along with it until Umehito is ready to meet her. Kirimi's servants teach her beyond what is acceptable for her age, with her knowing such terms as harem and debauchery because of her love of shōjo manga.

Because Kirimi cannot face her fear of darkness, the Host Club members have to force Umehito to face his fear of light instead, which they have some success with when he manages to resist flashlights, but not enough to go outside. However, when Kirimi is chased by a cat outdoor, Umehito braves himself to rescue her and reveals his real appearance to Kirimi beneath the black wig and hood, although he immediately collapses shortly after. The two appear to have grown closer afterward when she smiles at Umehito's shy attempt to get her attention through Belzeneff. Later chapters show that Kirimi has also conquered her fear of darkness and begins to tag along with her brother is wearing a hood and being "creepy."

Voiced by: Kurumi Mamiya (Japanese); Cherami Leigh (English)
Portrayed by: Mone Sawada

==== Takeshi Kuze ====
Takeshi Kuze (九瀬 猛, Kuze Takeshi) is the president of Ouran's American football Club, the Ouran Orages (the word comes from the French for "Tempest"), referred to by Tamaki as the most talented of all of Ouran's athletic clubs. Kuze has a long-standing rivalry with Kyoya, despite the fact they were once childhood friends, partly due to Kuze's habit of eating oranges with the rind still on. His family holds the largest share of imported produce in Japan. Kuze and Kyoya's rivalry has results in several battles between the Host Club and the Football Club. For example, there is a battle between them to see who can get the prime space at the school's cultural festival, which is decided by holding a race, which the Host Club wins.

Portrayed by: Tomohiro Ichikawa, Yūsuke Kashiwagi (musical)

==== Kazukiyo Sōga ====
Kazukiyo Sōga (相賀 和清, Sōga Kazukiyo) is the Class President of 1-A, who suffers from nyctophobia (a severe fear of the dark) and anxiety of just about anything scary. He has romantic feelings for Class 1-A's Vice-President Momoka, whom he has known for years, but he is initially too shy to say anything. Hikaru and Kaoru comment that he is the kind of person with pure feelings who they cannot tease, possibly because he is more emotionally vulnerable than Tamaki. In the manga, he unwittingly caused Haruhi trouble with her scholarship when he ranked as the top student of his grade. Volume 6 reveals that his father is a famous politician. In the volume 18 extras, he is seen as a college student, confessing nervously to Momoka as Haruhi and the twins cheer him on from a distance; he and Momoka are also seen in the July 2011 special chapter, as first-year students in the law faculty along with Haruhi (whom they still call Haruhi-kun, despite knowing her gender).

Voiced by: Shigenori Yamazaki (Japanese); Kyle Hebert (English)

==== Momoka Kurakano ====
Momoka Kurakano (倉賀野 百華, Kurakano Momoka) is the Class Vice-President of 1-A. Initially fond of Haruhi, she is a frequent client of hers in the Host Club. In the volume 18 extras, she is seen as a college student, smiling as Soga confesses nervously to her; she and Soga are also seen in the July 2011 special chapter, as first-year students in the law faculty along with Haruhi (whom they still call Haruhi-kun, despite knowing her gender).

Voiced by: Tomomi Watanabe (Japanese); Carrie Savage (English)
Portrayed by: Nana Seino

==== Arai ====
Arai (荒井) is Haruhi's middle school friend who lives near Karuizawa, which Haruhi and the Host Club visit the summer holiday. As he completely lost contact with Haruhi after graduation, the two are surprised when they meet in Misuzu's summer house. The two begin to exchange stories and recount their experiences since graduation, inciting jealousy on Hikaru's part, who is discontented and goes mad whenever he sees the two become closer. His patience reaches its nadir when Arai stumbles upon Haruhi and Hikaru while walking together through a market. Hikaru lashes out at the two before leaving, assuming that the two would come back home together. However, Misuzu later gets a phone call from Arai, who states that Haruhi had allowed him to go home earlier, which means that she is still out there somewhere, hiding from the thunderstorm. Arai and Hikaru then make amends at the end of the holiday.

Voiced by: Kazuki Taketani (Japanese); Jerry Jewell (English)
Portrayed by: Ryutarou Akimoto

==== Yūko Kōsaka ====
Yuuko Kousaka (高坂 由布子, Kōsaka Yūko) is the lawyer of the Suoh family. She was a junior of Haruhi's mother, Kotoko, back when she was alive and was close to her enough to know that Haruhi does indeed resemble her mother quite a lot. Haruhi mistakenly assumes her to be her mother at first, suggesting that she may resemble Kotoko. As it is revealed, Kousaka is sent by Shizue Suoh to spy on and gather information about the Host Club, especially Haruhi, and report them to her immediately. Kyoya suspects this since the time of the New Year's celebration where Kousaka "coincidentally" goes to the same shrine as the Host Club, though he is too distracted by Haruhi's kidnapping that time to learn more about her. This information persuades Shizue to allow Tamaki back to the main mansion. Still, it forbids him to run the Host Club since, according to her, it messes up Haruhi's life and threatens her with danger, including the kidnapping mentioned above. This leads to the Host Club's disbandment and Haruhi and Tamaki's temporary estrangement with each other. However, when Haruhi and Tamaki have reconciled and the Suoh as a whole resolved their differences, Kousaka resigns from her job and moves to a small office, stating to Haruhi that she does not want to be involved in another messy affair like the Suoh family again.

==== Shima Maezono ====
Shima Maezono (前園 シマ, Maezono Shima) is an old retainer of the Suoh family. She is stated to be 82 years old. She was originally a servant of the main mansion, but as per Shizue's orders, she served as Tamaki's assistant and tutor in the second mansion. Shima is quite strict on Tamaki and makes him study more to prepare himself as the heir of the Suoh. Shima moves back to the main mansion when Tamaki is allowed by Shizue to live there.

Voiced by: Yasuko Hatori

==== Éclair Tonnerre ====
An anime-only character, Éclair Tonnerre (エクレール・トネール, Ekurēru Tonēru) is the beautiful and cunning heir to the France-based Grand Tonnerre Group, which in the anime employs Tamaki's mother as a servant in Éclair's house. Having heard a great deal about Tamaki from his mother, Éclair develops a crush on him, and Tamaki's grandmother, who detests his mother, concocts a scheme to make him Éclair's husband. She tracks down Tamaki in Japan and convinces him to leave the Host Club, offering him a chance to see his mother if he complies with her wishes. She secures noninterference from the Ootori group by arranging for the Grand Tonnerre Group to buy Ootori Medical to control Kyoya's father.

She does not immediately recognize Haruhi as a girl. However, she does believe that Haruhi is Tamaki's male lover. This leads her to try to drive a wedge between Haruhi and Tamaki, with some degree of success. In the end, Tamaki leaves Éclair to save Haruhi's life, but not before leaving a good impression by genuinely smiling at her and thanking her for letting him go. She then asks her driver to head toward the airport without Tamaki, speaking of how wonderful and pure-hearted Tamaki is since he could smile at her after all that she had done. She reveals that Tamaki's mother is now a housekeeper at her house, and it is suggested that she may somehow arrange for Tamaki to see his mother again.

Her name is French for "lightning thunder." It symbolizes Haruhi's greatest fear, namely her fear of thunder and her fear of Tamaki being taken away.

Voiced by: Yukari Tamura (Japanese); Colleen Clinkenbeard (English)

== Reception ==
IGN praised the Host Club characters for being well-animated in the show, as they are made simpler without losing the details. The characters there are not only well-drawn but also well-written. Haruhi Fujioka is "actually written smart and acts smart," instead of other anime protagonists who are claimed to be smart without apparent evidence in the show.

== See also ==
- List of Ouran High School Host Club episodes
- List of Ouran High School Host Club chapters
