= Ouran High School Host Club (film) =

- Film poster for Ouran High School Host Club

Japanese name
- Kanji: 映画 桜蘭高校ホスト部
Transcriptions
- Revised Hepburn: Gekijoban Oran Koko Hosutobu
- Directed by: Choru Han
- Written by: Natsuko Ikeda
- Based on: Ouran High School Host Club by Bisco Hatori
- Starring: Haruna Kawaguchi; Manpei Takagi; Shinpei Takagi; Yusuke Yamamoto; Shunsuke Daito; Yudai Chiba; Masaya Nakamura; Ryo Ryusei
- Distributed by: Sony Pictures Entertainment Japan
- Release date: March 17, 2012
- Running time: 105 min.
- Country: Japan
- Language: Japanese
- Box office: US$2.8 million

Movie Edition Ouran High School Host Club (映画 桜蘭高校ホスト部, Gekijoban Oran Koko Hosutobu) is a 2012 Japanese school comedy film written by Natsuko Ikeda and directed by Choru Han. The film is a live action adaptation of the manga series Ouran High School Host Club by Bisco Hatori. It was released on March 17, 2012.

== Plot ==
Following the events of the TV series, Haruhi Fujioka, a brilliant student from a middle-class family, continues to attend the prestigious Ouran Academy and to work in its Host Club, a unique club composed of six handsome boys: the princely Tamaki Suoh, cool Kyoya Ootori, playful twins Hikaru and Kaoru Hitachiin, cutesy Mitsukuni "Honey" Haninozuka, and stoic Takashi "Mori" Morinozuka, who entertain their clientele with after-school tea service and flirting. She agrees to do so in order to pay for the accidental breakage of an expensive Renaissance vase. Having spent a year in the club dressed as a boy and acting as the natural Host, Haruhi is accustomed to its ways but becomes flustered when she learns from a romance magazine given to her by the creepy occultist Umehito Nekozawa that she has supposedly fallen in love with Tamaki. This does not sit well with Hikaru, who has feelings for Haruhi.

In the meantime, the Host Club is about to attend the annual Ouran Festival, whose winning reward is the right to use the luxurious Central Salon for their festival activities. The club has to compete against, among others, the Black Magic Club (led by Nekozawa) and the American Football Club, led by Kyoya's rival, Takeshi Kuze. At the same time, the school also welcomes Princess Michelle Monaru of Singapore as an honorary student. The spoiled Michelle wants everyone to cherish her and later appears to make moves on Tamaki, which makes Haruhi jealous. However, it is revealed that Michelle only approaches Tamaki in order for her disgraced family to lock in a deal with the Suoh family, which she does to appease her brother, Lawrence, with whom she is estranged due to the duties he assumed after their parents' deaths.

A prized book belonging to Michelle falls in the rain and Haruhi attempts to retrieve it. Tamaki, in an attempt to protect her, is injured. Upon learning about this, as well as the Monarus' true motives, Shizue Suoh, Tamaki's grandmother and the family matriarch, refuses to deal with the Monaru family.

Realizing that Michelle's problem is loneliness, Haruhi decides to participate in the Host Club's attempt to make her smile again by winning the Festival. They invite Lawrence to Japan, then present him to her as her family treasure, the Festival's end goal. Michelle's book, which Haruhi retrieved earlier, turns out to be a cookbook containing the Monaru family's favorite recipes and that Michelle has been waiting for her brother to come home in order that they might enjoy a proper dinner together once more. The siblings reconcile and the Host Club is declared the winner of the Festival and the Central Salon. There, Hikaru expresses his sentiment that, although he loves Haruhi, he is content to see her happy with Tamaki. Later, when the Host Club takes a walk by a river, Haruhi unsuccessfully tries to express her feelings but in the process, trips and accidentally kisses Tamaki, much to their embarrassment.

Through the closing credits, a scene is displayed in which Haruhi finally manages to enjoy otoro, after being denied long ago.

== Cast ==
- Haruna Kawaguchi as Haruhi Fujioka
  - Momoka Ishii as Young Haruhi
- Yusuke Yamamoto as Tamaki Suoh
- Shunsuke Daito as Kyoya Ootori
- Ryo Ryusei as Umehito Nekozawa
- Masaya Nakamura as Takashi "Mori" Morinozuka
- Yudai Chiba as Mitsukuni "Honey" Haninozuka
- Shinpei Takagi as Hikaru Hitachiin
- Manpei Takagi as Kaoru Hitachiin
- Tomohiro Ichikawa as Takeshi Kuze
- Haru Bando as Kanan Mitsuyama
- Mariko Shinoda as Michelle Erika Monaru
- Nichkhun as Lawrence Shin Monaru
- Naomi Zaizen as Anne-Sophie
- Shigeyuki Totsugi as Ryoji "Ranka" Fujioka
- Ami Suzuki as Kotoko Fujioka
- Takeshi Masu as Yuzuru Suou
- Kyoko Enami as Shizue Suou
- Hana Sugisaki as Reiko Kanazuki

== Reception ==
The film earned $2,821,766 at the Japanese box office.
