= Yoshinori Fujita =

Japanese voice actor (born 1976)

- 藤田 圭宣
- Born: October 27, 1976 (age 49); Aomori, Japan
- Occupation: Voice actor
- Agent: Arts Vision
- Notable credit: Ouran High School Host Club as Kaoru Hitachiin

Yoshinori Fujita (藤田 圭宣, Fujita Yoshinori; born October 27, 1976, in Aomori, Japan) is a Japanese voice actor whose notable roles include series like Ouran High School Host Club and Trinity Blood.

== Filmography ==
Year	Series	Role	Notes	Source
2001	Hikarian	Hitachi Red, others		
2002	Please Teacher!	Male student		
2002	Princess Tutu	Crown		
2002	Duel Masters	Jamira		
2003	Godannar	Yanagisawa		
2003	F-Zero: GP Legend	Gordon		
2004	W Wish	Tomokazu Kishida		
2005	Honey and Clover	Yamada's brother		
2005	Trinity Blood	Alessandro XVIII		
2006	Tsuyokiss - Cool×Sweet	Tsuchinaga-san		
2006	xxxHolic	Eric (Karasu Tengu)		
2006	Ōban Star-Racers	Koji		
2006	Ouran High School Host Club	Kaoru Hitachiin		
2007	Les Misérables: Shōjo Cosette	Jean Prouvaire		
2007	Nodame Cantabile	Masumi Okuyama		
2007	Dinosaur King	Sanzo		
2007	Chō Gekijōban Keroro Gunsō 2: Shinkai no Princess de Arimasu!	Kiruru		
2007	Heroic Age	Phaetho O		
2007	Bokurano	Isao Kako		
2007	Naruto Shippuden: the Movie	Taruho		
2007	Bamboo Blade	Makoto Iwasa		
2007	Legend of the Mystical Ninja	Noboru		
2007	Ghost Hound	Atsushi Hirata		
2008	S · A: Special A	Hajime Kakei		
2008	Soul Eater	Justin Law		
2008	Kyōran Kazoku Nikki	Ginka Midarezaki		
2008	Kamen Rider Kiva: King of the Castle in the Demon World	Gargoyle Legendorga		
2008	Skip Beat	Hiroaki Ogata		
2009	Asura Cryin'	Yasutake Satomi		

=== Video games ===
Year	Series	Role	Notes	Source
1997	Puyo Puyo SUN	Skeleton T	N64	
2001	Mega Man X6	Narration		
2004	W Wish	Tomokazu Kishida		
	Ouran High School Host Club	Kaoru Hitachiin		
	Love Drops ~Miracle Live Story~	St. Todo		
	Nodame Cantabile	Masumi Okuyama		
	Blood+ Final Piece	Limon		

=== Drama CDs ===
Series	Role	Notes	Source
Ouran High School Host Club	Kaoru Hitachiin		
Kyōran Kazoku Nikki	Midare zaki ginka		
Love Drops ~Miracle Live Story~	St. Todo		
Working!!	Hiroomi Soma		

=== Television animation ===
Series	Role	Notes	Source
Maho Girls PreCure!	François	ep 3 to ep 28	

=== Dubbing ===
- All the Boys Love Mandy Lane, Red (Aaron Himelstein)
- Mr. & Mrs. Smith (2010 TV Asahi edition), Benjamin "The Tank" Danz (Adam Brody)
