= Millennium Snow =

Japanese manga

- English cover of the first manga volume

千年の雪 (Sennen no Yuki)
- Genre: Gothic fantasy; Romance; Supernatural
- Manga
- Written by: Bisco Hatori
- Published by: Hakusensha
- English publisher: AUS: Madman Entertainment; NA: Viz Media; SEA: Chuang Yi
- Magazine: LaLa, LaLa DX
- Original run: July 2001 – December 10, 2013
- Volumes: 4

Millennium Snow (千年の雪, Sennen no Yuki), also known as A Thousand Years of Snow, is a Japanese manga series written and illustrated by Bisco Hatori. It was originally serialized in Hakusensha's LaLa magazine from July 2001 to May 2002, and later resumed in the January 2013 issue of LaLa DX and ended in the December 2013 issue. The story focuses on a sickly teenage girl and a vampire who can save her life. Millennium Snow is licensed in English for release in North America, Australia and Southeast Asia.

== Plot ==
Millennium Snow focuses on Chiyuki Matsuoka, a high school girl hospitalized with a heart problem. Since birth her heart has been very weak and she was told that she would probably live to be only fifteen. However, one day she meets Tōya Kanō, a vampire, with the opposite problem: Tōya lives for about one thousand years. It's customary for a vampire at his age of eighteen to choose a human partner to be with for 1000 years who in turn would let him drink their blood and share his life span for the millennium.

Early in the series, Chiyuki offers Tōya her blood, so that she would be able to live longer, but Tōya refuses, claiming he dislikes the sight and taste of blood. In the beginning, he even looks down on humans, believing that they are weak creatures who will only die before him and leave him behind, but later on he, with the help of Chiyuki, starts to see the world in a different perspective.

== Characters ==
Millennium Snow main characters: Tōya (left), Chiyuki (center), and Satsuki (right).

Chiyuki Matsuoka (松岡 千雪, Matsuoka Chiyuki)
The heroine of the story, Chiyuki is a 17-year-old high school student who is regularly hospitalized due to having a weak heart condition since birth; due to this, her life expectancy is very short and was even told that she may not survive the next year. She suffers from mini heart attacks whenever she becomes very distressed and had worsened severely at the beginning of the manga. She tends to be a spunky person who is able to withstand anything. However, she also can be very emotional and cries a lot accordingly.
Upon her first meeting with Tōya, he tells her that humans are weak. Later, they go out shopping but Chiyuki has a heart attack and is immediately sent back to the hospital. When they return to the hospital, she believes she is finally dying and tells him not to be sad if she dies because other people out there need him. Distraught, he saves her by giving her a little bit of his blood. Since then, Chiyuki's health has improved to the point when she starts attending school again but is adamant to stay with him. The effects are not permanent as he tells her that it's only a matter of time before her heart fails her again.
Tōya Kanō (トウヤ, Kanō Tōya)
Tōya is the 18-year-old vampire that Chiyuki meets. While Tōya tells Chiyuki that he hates blood, his friend Yamimaru reveals to Chiyuki that he, like any other vampire, does indeed like blood but simply doesn't want to be a burden on anyone. He can be out during the daytime, though still avoids garlic. Since he doesn't take in any blood, he has become anemic and whenever he is starving for food, he often falls over and is unable to move around until Yamimaru comes to help him. Later in the series, Chiyuki helps them by giving Toya a whole day's worth of food during their school lessons.
The main reason Tōya does not want to look for a partner is that he would not want to force anyone to live for a thousand years as he sees it as more of a curse than a blessing. He often puts on the facade that he's a tough guy, but in reality he's quite the opposite. He extremely dislikes Satsuki. As noted by Yamimaru, he is just jealous that he and Chiyuki have become so close because he cares for Chiyuki more than anyone else. Eventually, he starts to fall in love with Chiyuki.
Yamimaru (闇丸)
Tōya's servant bat who was at first the only one that Tōya can rely on, especially if Tōya has collapsed from a lack of energy. He has the ability to transform into a normal looking human, though this can only be done for about four to five hours per day. He has two human forms: one that is very tall (6'6") and theoretically looks like Tōya's older brother, and a much younger version who can theoretically appear to be Tōya's younger brother.
Satsuki Akiyoshi (有吉 砂月, Akiyoshi Satsuki)
He is a very handsome student at Chiyuki's school who's very popular among the girls. He tends to be very suave and flirts a lot with the female students. As noted by Chiyuki, he also has a great sense of humor.
Satsuki lives with his grandmother and has been able to gain a lot of her wisdom because of it. Similar to Tōya, he is not a human but in fact a werewolf. It is due to this that he constantly tries to appear as a normal person. If he didn't, he would always feel very insecure about him being a werewolf. He also seems to care a lot for Chiyuki and likes to protect (as well as flirt with) her to annoy Tōya. Later, he too starts to develop feelings for Chiyuki.
Keigo Kuramatai
He is Chiyuki's 26-year-old cousin who also acts like a brother to her. He is very protective of her due to her health; he can also be very possessive of her. Chiyuki believes that he left for the United States to study English, but the truth is that he is studying to become a heart specialist for her sake. He tries to separate Chiyuki from Tōya; even going as far as attempting to murder Tōya with a rock but manages to hit Chiyuki instead. He does not know Satsuki is a werewolf.

== Release ==
Millennium Snow is written and illustrated by Bisco Hatori. The manga was originally serialized in Hakusensha's LaLa magazine between the July 2001 and May 2002 issues, and was later collected into two tankōbon volumes published from November 2001 to August 2002. A special chapter titled Chikai no Hi (誓いの日) was released in the July 2002 issue of LaLa DX. The manga resumed in the January 2013 issue of LaLa DX, and ended in the December 2013 issue. Millennium Snow is licensed in English for release in North America by Viz Media, and in New Zealand and Australia by Madman Entertainment. Chuang Yi has licensed the series in English and Mandarin.

No.	Original release date	Original ISBN	English release date	English ISBN
1	November 2001	978-4-5921-7789-0	April 3, 2007 (NA); October 10, 2007 (AU)	978-1-4215-1202-0 (NA); ISBN 981-269-964-3 (AU)
2	August 5, 2002	978-4-5921-7315-1	July 3, 2007 (NA); May 12, 2007 (AU)	978-1-4215-1203-7 (NA); ISBN 981-269-965-1 (AU)
3	August 5, 2013	978-4-5921-9516-0	June 3, 2014	978-1-4215-7244-4
4	March 5, 2014	978-4-5921-9517-7	December 2, 2014	978-1-4215-7246-8

== Reception ==
Millennium Snow was positively received by readers. The first volume of the English-language release appeared at the fourth place on Publishers Weekly's list of the bestselling graphic novels for April 2007. More than 20,000 copies of the first volume were sold in 2007. In 2013, the Japanese edition of volume three sold an estimated 27,582 copies for the week of August 5–11, with an estimated 27,765 copies sold in all.

In his review of the first Millennium Snow volume, Anime News Network's Theron Martin felt that the character designs "not only have the typical ridiculously lanky look but simply aren't very appealing despite her efforts to portray Toya and Satsuki as bishonen studs." Martin liked the unrelated bonus story at the end of the volume, calling it "exquisitely beautiful and melancholy". Millennium Snow ranked sixth on About.com's 2007 Reader's Poll for Best New Shojo Manga.
