= Facade (disambiguation) =

A façade is the exterior of a building.

Facade, Façade, or Facades may also refer to:

- Facade constitutions
- Façade (entertainment), poems by Edith Sitwell set to music by William Walton
- Façade (ballet), a ballet by Frederick Ashton based on the Sitwell/Walton work, above
- Façade (video game), a 2005 independent experimental video game in the genre of interactive fiction
- Facade pattern, in programming, a structural pattern used alongside an API
- "Façade" (song), by Disturbed on the album Indestructible
- "Façade" (song), a 2023 song by Digga D and Potter Payper
- Facades (album), a 1979 album by Sad Café
- Facades, a composition by Philip Glass

== See also ==
- Fasad, an Islamic term referring to social disorder
