= Bisco Hatori =

Japanese manga artist

Bisco Hatori 葉鳥ビスコ
- Born: August 30, 1975 (age 51) Saitama, Japan
- Areas: Character design, writer, manga artist
- Notable works: Millennium Snow; Ouran High School Host Club

Bisco Hatori (葉鳥ビスコ, Hatori Bisuko; born August 30, 1975) is a Japanese manga artist. Her name is a pen name that she has said "holds special meaning to her." Her first series was Millennium Snow, however she is best known for her series Ouran High School Host Club.

== Biography ==
From Saitama, Japan, her pseudonym is Bisco Hatori. She has worked for such magazines as LaLa. Her manga debut was A Moment of Romance in LaLa DX. Her first series was Millennium Snow, which was put on hiatus because of her other manga, the comedy Ouran High School Host Club, which became her breakout hit. It placed in the 50 top-selling manga in Japan for both 2008 and 2009. Hatori's work is influenced by manga such as Please Save My Earth, a shōjo science fiction series, and the basketball manga Slam Dunk. She finished Ouran High School Host Club in 2010. In January 2012, Hatori wrote a science-fiction comedy one-shot manga titled Detarame Mōsōryoku Opera published in LaLa. The second chapter was published in May 2012. Millennium Snow was later finished in 2014.

She has since worked on her series Behind the scenes!!, comedy manga from 2014 to 2018. In 2019, Viz Media announced that Hatori would attend the Anime Expo as a paneled guest.

== Works ==
- Isshunkan no Romance (一瞬間のロマンス, A Romance of One Moment)
- Millennium Snow (2001–2013) – 4 volumes (Started in 2002 and was on hiatus until 2013)
- Ouran High School Host Club (2002–2010) – 18 volumes
- Detarame Mōsōryoku Opera (2012) – 1 volume
- Petite Pêche (2013–2015) –1 volume
- Behind the Scenes!! (ウラカタ!!, Urakata!!) (2014–2018) – 7 volumes

== Awards ==
Hatori won the Outstanding Debut in the 26th Hakusensha Newcomers' Awards for her work, Millenium Snow, along with Kiyo Fujiwara, who also won the same award for her work, Boku wa Ne.
