= Ouran High School Host Club =

Japanese manga series

- First tankōbon volume cover, featuring Haruhi Fujioka (left) and Tamaki Suoh (right)

桜蘭高校ホスト部 (Ōran Kōkō Hosuto Kurabu)
- Genre: Drama; Reverse harem; Romantic comedy
- Manga
- Written by: Bisco Hatori
- Published by: Hakusensha
- English publisher: AUS: Madman Entertainment; NA: Viz Media; SG: Chuang Yi
- Magazine: LaLa
- Original run: September 2002 – November 2010
- Volumes: 18
- Anime television series
- Directed by: Takuya Igarashi
- Produced by: Toshio Nakatani; Manabu Tamura; Masahiko Minami; Masahiro Yamashita
- Written by: Yōji Enokido
- Music by: Yoshihisa Hirano
- Studio: Bones
- Licensed by: Crunchyroll (Note: In North America through Crunchyroll, LLC (formerly known as Funimation), in the United Kingdom through Crunchyroll UK and Ireland (formerly known as Manga Entertainment), and in Australia through Crunchyroll Pty. Ltd (formerly known as Madman Anime. Manga Entertainment originally licensed the series in the United Kingdom in 2009 until its expiration in 2016.); SEA: Muse Communication; UK: Anime Limited (former)
- Original network: Nippon TV
- English network: AU: ABC Me; US: Funimation Channel
- Original run: April 5, 2006 – September 26, 2006
- Episodes: 26
- Television drama
- Produced by: Choru Han; Yasuhito Tachibana
- Written by: Ikeda Natsuko
- Music by: Kyo Nakanishi
- Original network: TBS
- Original run: July 22, 2011 – September 30, 2011
- Episodes: 11
- Live-action film
- Ouran High School Host Club (2012)
- icon

Ouran High School Host Club (Japanese: 桜蘭高校ホスト部, Hepburn: Ōran Kōkō Hosuto Kurabu) is a Japanese romantic comedy manga series written and illustrated by Bisco Hatori. It was serialized in Hakusensha's LaLa magazine from September 2002 to November 2010. The series follows Haruhi Fujioka, a scholarship student at Ouran Academy, and the other members of the school's popular host club. The story focuses on the relationships within and outside the Club.

The manga was adapted into an animated television series directed by Takuya Igarashi and produced by Bones, which ran from April to September 2006. Other media based on the series includes a series of audio dramas, a Japanese television drama series, a 2012 live-action film adaptation, and a visual novel by Idea Factory. Three musical adaptations were staged in Japan from 2022 to 2023.

Ouran High School Host Club has been generally well-received, with its comedy and parody of otaku culture being particularly commended. Its depiction of LGBTQ characters has seen both praise and criticism. The manga was a commercial success, with over 14 million copies in circulation by January 2026.

== Plot ==
The comedic series revolves around the escapades of Haruhi Fujioka, a scholarship student at the prestigious Ouran Academy, an elite private school for rich kids located in Bunkyo, Tokyo. Looking for a quiet place to study, Haruhi stumbles upon the otherwise-abandoned Third Music Room, a place where the Host Club, a group of six male students, gathers to entertain female "clients" with food and themed parties. During their initial encounter, Haruhi accidentally destroys an antique vase valued at ¥8,000,000 (around US$51,000 as of late 2026) and must work off the debt as the club's errand boy. Her short hair, slouching attire, and gender-ambiguous face cause her to be mistaken by the Hosts for a male student. They eventually realize her actual gender, but not before learning what a "natural" she is at hosting, and thus the other Hosts decide to promote her to a member of the Host Club so that she may work off her debt by procuring a certain number of clients by the time she graduates.

== Media ==
=== Manga ===
The Ouran High School Host Club manga series was serialized between the September 2002 and November 2010 issues of LaLa magazine. The individual chapters were collected in eighteen tankōbon volumes between August 5, 2003, and April 5, 2011.

Hakusensha released a fanbook for the series on August 4, 2009, titled Ōran Kōkō Hosuto Kurabu Fanbukku: Uki Doki Kōryaku Daisakusen (桜蘭高校ホスト部(クラブ)ファンブック～うきドキ☆攻略大作戦～).

The series is licensed in English North America by Viz Media under its Shojo Beat imprint, and in Indonesia in the monthly manga magazine Hanalala. It was published in Singapore (in both simplified Chinese and English) by Chuang Yi, and in Poland by JPF.

=== Anime ===
A 26-episode anime television series aired between April 5 and September 26, 2006, on NTV, adapting the first eight volumes of the manga. The series was produced by Nippon Television, VAP, Bones and Hakusensha. It was directed by Takuya Igarashi, with Yōji Enokido handling series composition and writing the scripts, Kumiko Takahashi designing the characters and Yoshihisa Hirano composing the music. It features a different cast from the audio dramas, with Maaya Sakamoto as Haruhi Fujioka and Mamoru Miyano as Tamaki Suoh.

The series is licensed for distribution in North America by Funimation Entertainment. Caitlin Glass was the ADR director of the series, as well as voicing Haruhi. The first anime DVD set containing the first thirteen episodes was released on October 28, 2008, in North America. The second volume containing the last thirteen episodes was released on January 6, 2009. On April 27, 2009, the series made its North American television debut on the Funimation Channel. The series is also available for digital streaming on the Funimation app, but was moved over to the Crunchyroll streaming service in 2022 after the latter was acquired a year prior by Sony Pictures Television, Funimation's parent company following a 2018 acquisition. On September 1, 2022, Netflix began streaming the series in 190 countries. Muse Communication licensed the series in Southeast Asia and streamed on Muse Asia YouTube channel.

=== Music and audio CDs ===
Three drama CDs were released in 2003, as well as two tracks included in LaLa magazine's 28th and 29th anniversary CDs. Three soundtracks were released by Video and Audio Project for the Ouran High School Host Club anime adaptation. The first, Ouran High School Host Club Soundtrack & Character Song Collection (Part 1), was released in Japan on July 26, 2006, and contained twenty tracks, including the anime opening theme song. The second, Ouran High School Host Club Soundtrack & Character Song Collection 2, included an additional nineteen tracks and was released on August 23, 2006. On September 20, 2007, a third soundtrack, the Ouran High School Host Club Soundtrack & Character Song Collection Special Edition was released containing eight songs from the previous two tracks, with four additional songs.

=== Visual novel ===
The Ouran Host Club visual novel was released for PlayStation 2 on April 19, 2007, by Idea Factory. Based on the television series, the player makes decisions as Haruhi that affect the other hosts' feelings toward her. The game features Jean-Pierre Léo, a longtime French friend of Tamaki, and Sayuri Himemiya, a childhood friend of Haruhi, designed by the series creator. There are two other original characters. The game has been released exclusively in Japan. A Nintendo DS port of the game, updated with a fully voiced cast and new character-specific scenarios, was released on March 19, 2009.

=== Live-action TV series and film ===
A live-action TV series of Ouran began airing in Japan on TBS on July 22, 2011. The live-action adaption features Yusuke Yamamoto as Tamaki Suou and Haruna Kawaguchi as Haruhi Fujioka.

A live-action film of Ouran was announced during a fan meeting on August 25, 2011, and continues off from the conclusion of the television series. All actors of the live-action television series reprised their roles. The film was released on March 17, 2012. It was released on DVD and Blu-ray Disc on October 10, 2012.

The series had a spin-off named Ouran High School Host Club: Haruhi no Happy Birthday Daisakusen with the same cast that was originally broadcast on January 6, 2012, by LISMO drama, a mobile drama provided by au. This LISMO drama tells an original story worked on by the author of the manga. The drama revolves around the host club members becoming flustered upon learning that it is Haruhi's birthday. Through their misunderstandings about celebrating her birthday, the members make Haruhi angry. Kawaguchi, who plays Haruhi Fujioka, commented, "You will see an explosion of this well-known bright and silly character! It was fun playing the role, and all the host club members enjoyed the filming." Each episode is approximately five minutes long, and there are four episodes.

=== Stage musical ===
A stage musical adaptation was announced in June 2021. Directed by Chobi Natsuki, with Muck Akazawa as screenwriter and music by Yu, it opened at the Tennozu Galaxy Theater, Tokyo, and Mielparque Hall Osaka in January 2022. A second adaptation titled Kageki Ouran High School Host Club ƒ, which was directed by Kazuhito Yoneyama, ran at the Tennozu Galaxy Theater and Sankei Hall Breeze, Osaka, in December 2022. In April 2023, the third and final performance, Kageki Ouran High School Host Club Fine, was announced for a December run in Tokyo, with returning casts from the previous musical.

== Analysis and themes ==
Scholar Tania Darlington situates the series within a legacy of shōjo manga tropes that explore homosexuality, cross-dressing, and gender fluidity, tracing a lineage from early Boys' love works like The Heart of Thomas (1974) to influential cross-dressing narratives like The Rose of Versailles (1972).

As a female scholarship student who is mistaken for a boy, Haruhi's character embodies a "commoner" identity that critiques class structures, while her gender performance directly challenges rigid social binaries. Darlington posits that the series uses Haruhi's cross-dressing and the Host Club's exaggerated costuming for "self-mocking abdication of any pretensions at power." This parodic, campy framework, according to Darlington, allows the series to engage with potentially controversial themes of queerness and gender performativity, seen in character archetypes like the incestuous Hitachiin twins or the fetishized male hosts, while maintaining a mainstream, comedic appeal.

The inclusion of otaku character Renge Hoshakuji, who attempts to direct the Host Club members into dojinshi-inspired scenarios, serves as a meta-commentary on fan culture and the consumption of these subversive narratives.

== Reception ==
By December 2011, the series had over 13 million copies in circulation. The series is a parody of otaku culture, especially cross-dressing. The club often dresses up in dazzling costumes, and Renge Hōshakuji is also identified as an otaku. Rose Bridges, writing for Anime News Network, regards Ouran as being the first example of a "fujoshi comedy" genre—loosely defined as humorous anime with predominantly male casts that cater to shipping-obsessed fangirls.

The manga artist of the series Bisco Hatori appeared at Anime Expo 2019 at the Los Angeles Convention Center in Los Angeles. During several interviews and panels, she indicated that she would welcome another project concerning the characters and topics covered in Ouran but could not produce an anime and advised fans to continue petitioning the studio. When asked about the Boy Love suggested in the series, she stated that Ouran has always been meant to be a parody of yaoi manga. As for Haruhi being female, it was revealed that the character was originally meant to be a boy, but one of her editors suggested a gender swap. Thus, Hatori invented a female character that "doesn't need to dress up like a boy other than the fact that those are the clothing she wears and likes" without subtext. She expressed that she is not hung up on genre parameters or gender orientation because every person should be proud of being unique while remaining true to themselves. In summation, Hatori stressed Ouran being a story about family and friendship, without any intention of being a pioneer of "fujoshi comedy," though admits that it happened just the same.

In the 2020s, reviews of the series have been more critical of how Ouran High School Host Club represents aspects of the LGBTQ+ community. This includes debates about how the language used in the series has shifted in meaning over time, with terms in both Japanese and English-language version of the anime such as "tranny" being used to describe Haruhi's crossdressing father Ryoji "Ranka" Fujioka, which is considered as more of a slur today than it did when the series debuted. Criticism is also directed at the characters from the rival Zuka Club who have been described as fitting the stereotype of the "predatory lesbian" and being depicted as fascistic. These reviews overall appraised the series positively.
