= LGBTQ themes in Western animation =

In Western animation, LGBTQ themes means plotlines and characters which are lesbian, gay, bisexual, transgender, or otherwise queer in series, produced in Western countries, and not in Japan (i.e. anime), which can also have similar themes. Early examples included Bugs Bunny in drag, wearing a wig and a dress, as a form of comedy, or episodes of Tom & Jerry, under restrictive moral guidelines like the Hays Code with some arguing that animation has "always had a history of queerness" and that animation as a form has unique techniques for queer representation. This later evolved into gay-coded characters in Disney films like Beauty and the Beast and The Little Mermaid, and in animated series such as The Simpsons and South Park. In later years, other series would more prominently depict same-sex characters and relationships. This would include Adventure Time, Steven Universe, The Legend of Korra, Gravity Falls, Clarence, The Loud House, and Arthur.

Such series, and others, have encountered roadblocks, with series creators attempting to make their programs "more welcoming of different characters," and ensure all-ages animation is no longer "bereft of queer characters." Previously, an online database, by Insider, documented over 250 LGBTQ characters in children's animation dating back to 1983, but the "representation of overtly queer characters" skyrocketed from 2010 to 2020, with promotion of these series by some streaming platforms, while other companies were not supportive of overt representation, for one reason or another.

== History ==
=== Pre-1970s ===
Gender has always been a component of animation, with scholars Harry Benshoff and Sean Griffin writing that animation has always "hint[ed] at the performative nature of gender." They specifically cite the example of Bugs Bunny wearing a wig and a dress, acting as a female rabbit in drag. Several scholars argue that Bugs Bunny's use of drag demonstrates the performativity of gender. Some argued that the Walt Disney Company played with gender stereotypes in the past. Griffin stated that Disney's cartoon Ferdinand the Bull (1939) is "not necessarily gay, but it's definitely queer". The short film depicts a "sleepy eyed bull who doesn't conform to expectations of masculinity". Nico Lang of Harper's Bazaar said Disney's 1941 film The Reluctant Dragon "is extremely queer, even if it's not necessarily gay". He also noted the inclusion of a gay couple (two male antelopes) in Zootopia. Lang wrote, "in 1937, a group of lesbians in Chicago threw a series of bashes known as 'Mickey Mouse's parties.' These gatherings for like-minded ladies were a reference to the fact that 'Mickey Mouse' was a common term at the time for gay men", according to Griffin. Animation and popular culture scholar Jo Johnson would later describe Bugs Bunny as challenging "signifiers of traditional masculinity." Johnson would also argue that Looney Tunes pulled audiences challenges "the conventional notion of anatomy and gender." He also recounted that Bugs Bunny appeared in drag on "At least 45 separate occasions," and his gender ambiguity fluxes, showing masculinity and femininity at different times, even though he is clearly heterosexual. Johnson described shorts like "What's Opera, Doc?" as one of the most "subversive" because Bugs dresses as a woman through the majority of the animated short. Another scholar said that Bugs Bunny and Daffy Duck kissed male enemies so they could "humiliate and annoy them."

It would later be stated that with Bugs Bunny you could have "a rabbit kiss a man, and that wouldn't be considered this alarming thing" that would be censored or cut, and it was fine for Bugs Bunny to dress in drag because it was "meant as a form of comedy." Even so, the Hays Code was still enforced in the United States, which banned curse words, forbid depiction of interracial relationships, and had a "puritanical view of sex," and was replaced by a film rating system in 1968, with many of its "arbitrary moral guidelines" persisting for decades. Jo Johnson and Paul Wells observe that Jerry of Tom and Jerry has an androgynous design, even feminized, and noted a possible homoerotic subtext between Jerry and Tom, especially when there is cross-dressing, like the notable 1945 short "Flirty Birdy" where the ending shows the Eagle marries Tom while in drag. Johnson pointed to the 1966 short "Jerry-Go-Round", by Chuck Jones, as having a coded same-sex relationship between Jerry, who was gendered by Jones as female, and a female elephant who wears a pink tutu. She argued that the episode's ending could be read as a "prophetic depiction of Gay Pride." Cade M. Olmstead, an interdisciplinary philosophy scholar, built upon Johnson's work. He argued that Tom and Jerry "subverts normalized gender and sexuality structures" through theatrical play and performance, transgressing the normal construction of gender.

=== 1960s–1980s ===
Despite the queer coding in "Bugs Bunny" and "Tom & Jerry" cartoons, as scholars Deborah A. Fisher, Douglas L. Hill, Joel W. Grube, and Enid L. Gruber noted, before 1970, almost no gay characters were on television, and they remained relatively absent "until the 1990s." Erika Scheimer, daughter of Filmation founder Lou Scheimer, was the Assistant Recording Director for She-Ra: Princess of Power. She voiced various characters and felt comfortable working as a lesbian at Filmation, while shaping "one of the biggest animated gay icons of all time": She-Ra. In later years, animation producer ND Stevenson, the showrunner of the reboot series, She-Ra and the Princesses of Power, would argue that "the original She-Ra was incredibly gay for a show made in 1987" and the crew who worked on the reboot series tried to incorporate the same themes. Ursula, the octopus-inspired sea creature from the 1989 film, The Little Mermaid, was inspired by Divine, an American actor, singer and drag queen. Queer communities welcomed "her with open arms" despite that fact she was a villain, and her character was later praised by director John Waters. John Musker, a director of Moana, and co-director of The Little Mermaid, noted that Howard Ashman, a writer of the film, knew Divine and had one of the principal animators, Rob Minkoff, do drawings based on Divine. The other director of Moana (and a co-director of The Little Mermaid), Ron Clements, stated that it "just fit the character," while Musker called Ursula a "little mix of Divine and Joan Collins" and Jeffrey Schwarz described the film as "pretty queer".

=== 1990s ===
Ashman was also, reportedly, a "big fan" of John Waters, and after the film, he got sick, as he was HIV positive, and he died from AIDS before he could accept the Academy Award for the music selection of Beauty and the Beast. Filmmaker Jeffrey Schwarz, who did a documentary on Divine, thought the film was pretty queer, while Sarah Ashman Gillespie, Ashman's sister, called the film "totally subversive." It was also revealed that earlier designs of Ursula were inspired by the singer Patti LaBelle, with Musker saying that in the early development art for the character, and Minkoff adding that they were "trying to get some of Divine's big, campy, overweight diva" into the design, which was incorporated into the final character. She was also described as "Mae West of the deep sea" and the first plus-size icon in a Disney film. Akash Nikolas, a former editor for Zap2It, wrote, in a piece for The Atlantic, pointed to queer subtext and themes in The Little Mermaid, Beauty and the Beast, Pocahontas, Dumbo, Pinocchio, Aladdin, and Mulan, described Disney films as "both traditional and subversive," echoed by Hugh Ryan in Vice. During this decade, characters on Fox and Comedy Central shows comprised most of the LGBTQ characters on television. Shows like The Simpsons and South Park especially would be influential on other adult animations in the years to come. Continuing from the late 1980s, villains in Disney films which were queer coded appeared.

Some argued that cable television, which began to pick up in the 1990s, "opened the door for more representation" even though various levels of approvals remained. Animation and popular culture scholar Jo Johnson argued that 1990s animated sitcoms enabled queer characters to emerge from, in his words, its "relegated position...and drop an anvil on the head of heteronormativity." She further argued that shows such as The Simpsons, Family Guy, and King of the Hill subverted the nuclear family model and the "stereotypical gender roles assigned to it." He also said that The Simpsons, King of the Hill, and South Park satirized American mores and allowed homosexual characters as part of the family. Other scholars argued that in the 1990s, animators were determined to remind audiences watching that some cartoons were not for children, with "gay content" seen as a way to demonstrate a show is hip or sophisticated, with a running gag in The Critic that the boss of the title character believes the protagonist is gay. As such, The Critic and The Tick were said to be two animated shows with gay characters and gay references. The Simpsons would be noted as having "gay themes and characters" in various episodes.

=== 2000s ===
The 2000s brought with it Queer Duck, the first animated TV series on U.S. television which featured homosexuality as a major theme, an alien named Roger in American Dad who had an ambiguous sexuality, and an assortment of other shows. There was under-representation of gay characters through the Fall 2000 television season for all broadcast shows, according to scholars, with trend continuing until at least 2003. It would not be until 2005 that GLAAD would begin their annual "Where We Are on TV Report" starting its continuing effort to compile statistics on characters in the LGBTQ+ community, and other marginalized groups. GLAAD bemoaned the lack of representation. They noted in the regular 2006–2007 season, LGBTQ+ characters only comprised 1.3% of all regular characters on major broadcast networks (NBC, CBS, ABC, Fox, The CW, and UPN). Reports in 2008 and 2009 mentioned LGBTQ+ characters in animated comedies like The Simpsons and American Dad. and other prime-time programming such as Sit Down, Shut Up, The Goode Family, Rick & Steve: The Happiest Gay Couple in All the World, and Drawn Together, while having reservations about existing LGBTQ+ characters on television. In a 2009 report, GLAAD criticized the lack of Black LGBTQ characters as regular characters on television networks, and stated that most animated LGBT characters were on FOX, lamenting that while South Park historically had LGBT characters and storylines, it could be "hit or miss" like Family Guy.

=== 2010s ===
In 2010, animation and popular culture scholar Jo Johnson argued that the medium of animation itself is being used to "represent prime-time sexuality and gender in a more progressive way than a live-action show." She went on to say that progress made by animated shows has allowed audiences to laugh with, rather than at, queer characters. The 2010s were a decade which would change LGBT representation in animation going forward in a significant way. This included series such as The Legend of Korra, Steven Universe, Adventure Time, She-Ra and the Princesses of Power, Arthur, and BoJack Horseman.

GLAAD would report on trends with LGBTQ+ representation during this period. In 2014, the organization would comment that children's programming had been "slow to reflect the diversity its audience is experiencing in its daily life." Later, they would report that in the 2016-2017 broadcast season, the highest number of LGBTQ characters they had recorded yet appeared, and praised the increase of such characters on streaming services the next year. The organization later praised services such as Netflix, CW Seed, Amazon, and Hulu for increasing LGBTQ representation, the latter three in "daytime kids and family television." Insider later noted that according to their database of LGBTQ characters in children's animations, there was a "more than 200% spike in queer and gender-minority characters in children's animated TV shows" between 2017 and 2019 In July 2019, Leanne Italie, in an article for Associated Press, argued that LGBTQ diversity on children's television was growing. Others were more critical, calling for more LGBTQ animation and reported that LGBTQ+ characters in animated television remained somewhat rare.

=== 2020s ===
Building on the progress in the 2010s, the 2020s held the promise of changing LGBT representation in animation in a significant way, especially when it came to Western animation. In 2020, the Steven Universe franchise came to an end with the final episodes of Steven Universe Future, as did She-Ra and the Princesses of Power. The 2020s also included series with LGBTQ characters, such as The Hollow, DuckTales, Harley Quinn, and Kipo and the Age of Wonderbeasts. In their 2020–2021 GLAAD report praised representation in DuckTales, The Owl House, The Loud House, and Harley Quinn. The organization also pointed to representation in Doom Patrol, Young Justice, and Adventure Time: Distant Lands. In August 2021, Insider found that in their analysis of 259 LGBTQ cartoon characters, stretching back to the 1980s, that "only 10 out of just 70 identified people of color...had leading roles" and a significant proportion lacked "explicit racial specificity." In September 2021, Insider reporter Abbey White, said that children's animation is "arguably at the forefront of our conversations about non-binary identity and gender non-conforming identities," breaking down gender binaries reinforced in the media, and noted the animated series which are stepping up.

In 2025, GLAAD released their yearly "Where We Are on TV" report, and stated, according to Deadline that "LGBTQ representation appears to be at a pace of two steps forward, three steps back" due to the fact that 41% of LGBTQ characters across platforms will not return "due to series cancellations, endings or limited series format" while another 20% are on "shows that have not yet been renewed, their onscreen fates hang in the balance," with the organization calling for more authentic representation. In the report itself, which covered shows airing from June 1, 2024 to May 31, 2025, GLAAD pointed to LGBTQ+ supporting characters in The Great North, asexual and lesbian characters in Arcane (Viktor, Caitlyn, and Vi), transmasculine and lesbian characters in The Dragon Prince (Terristruis, Amaya and Queen Janai). The report also noted other series with queer characters, specifically Jurassic World: Chaos Theory, The Second Best Hospital in the Galaxy, The Bravest Knight, Solar Opposites, Harley Quinn, Big Mouth, Castlevania: Nocturne, Zombies: The Re-Animated Series, Vida the Vet, Primos, Monster High, Star Wars: Young Jedi Adventures, The Loud House, Total Drama reboot, Let's Go Bananas! and Star Trek: Lower Decks, while describing Your Friendly Neighborhood Spider-Man as an "inclusive series."

== Distribution, censorship and changes ==
From the 1930s to 1950s, animation in the U.S. was produced under the Hays Code, followed by the Motion Picture Association of America's film rating system, beginning in November 1968, which was used to help parents decide what films are appropriate for their children, and is administered by the Classification & Ratings Administration (CARA), a MPAA (and later MPA) independent division. Many television networks also had Broadcast Standards and Practices departments which were (and are) responsible for the moral, ethical, and legal implications of the program that the network airs.

This led to subtextual depictions of LGBTQ+ characters. For example, Greg Weisman, creator of Gargoyles, which was syndicated for most of its run, between 1994 and 1996, and then would air on ABC for the last two years of its broadcast, from 1996 to 1997, said that he was not allowed to have LGBTQ representation in the series due to fear of backlash, saying that ABC would "freak out" over responses and said they were "scared of parental response." He previously confirmed characters as within the LGBTQ+ community, including Lexington as gay, in 2008. Renee Montoya, a police officer who first appeared in Batman: The Animated Series, was later revealed to be a lesbian, which was never stated in BTAS, but the DCAU version of Montoya was eventually confirmed to be a lesbian in Batman: The Adventures Continue Season II #4, when in where she is in a relationship with another woman named Gloria Navarro. Renee Montoya also appeared in The New Batman Adventures and Gotham Girls.

Some claimed that Silver Spooner, the sidekick to Barbequor, appeared in a May 1996 episode of Dexter's Laboratory titled "Dial M for Monkey: Barbequor," was a stereotype of gay men, others said it had more to do with copyright infringement as the estate of Jack Kirby threatened to sue Cartoon Network over the parody character. In addition, Blazing Dragons (1996-1998), a series created by Terry Jones and Gavin Scott, features Sir Blaze, a flamboyant and effeminate character. His implicit homosexuality was censored when the series aired on Toon Disney in the United States. Others argued that Buttercup, in the April 7, 1999 episode of The Powerpuff Girls, titled "The Rowdyruff Boys", does not enjoy the experience and is the "possible lesbian" of the Powerpuff Girls.

=== Censorship and broadcast standards ===
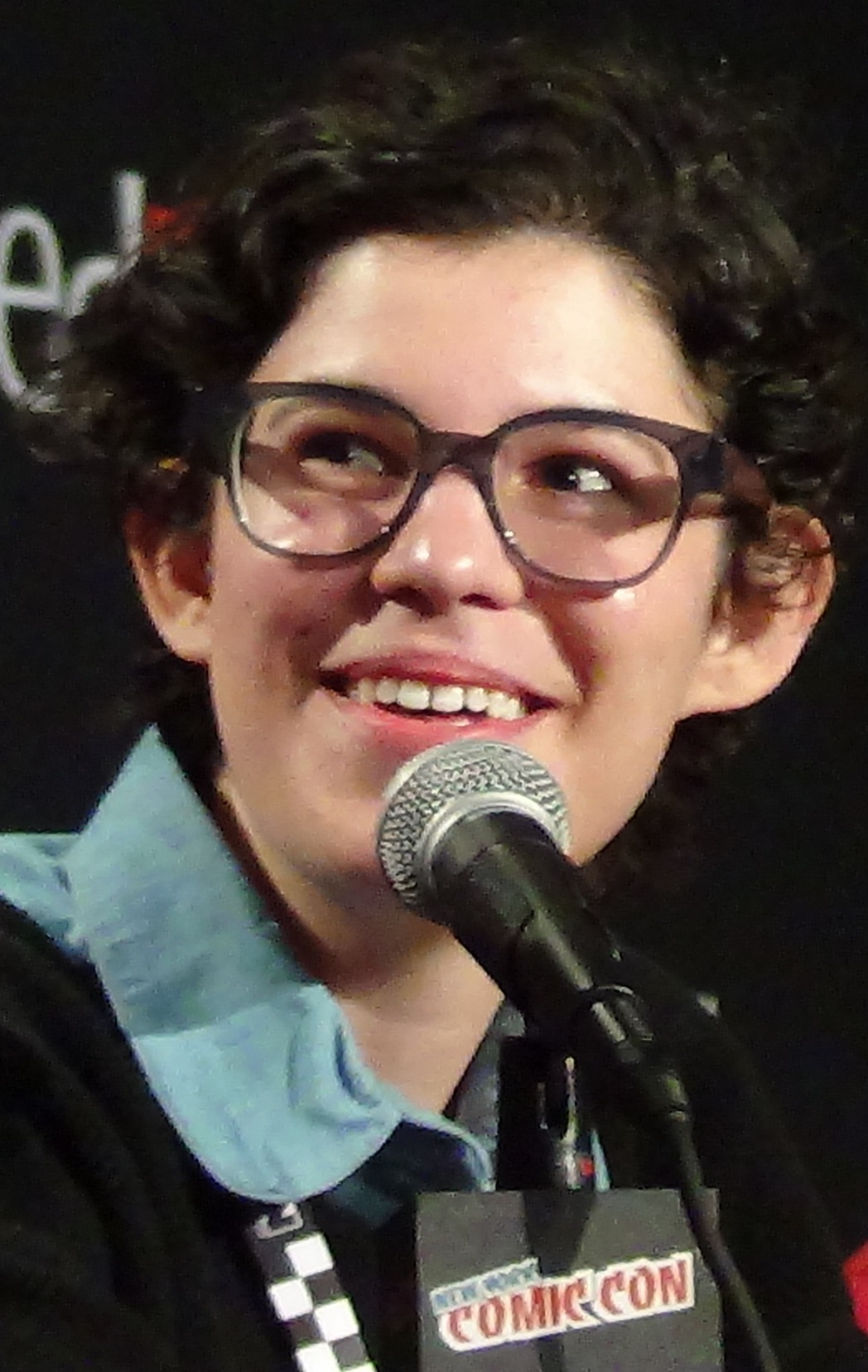
Rebecca Sugar in 2014; she would first work on Adventure Time and would later create her own show, Steven Universe

In the 2000s, Static Shock, SpongeBob SquarePants, and The Proud Family were impacted by standards, censorship, and occasional protests by Christian fundamentalists. Richie Foley, also known as Gear, who appeared in Kids' WB's Static Shock was based on an openly gay character named Rick Stone from the original comic. Dwayne McDuffie, one of the show's creators, said he dealt with the homosexuality of Richie by writing him "aggressively and unconvincingly announcing his heterosexuality whenever possible...while Virgil rolled his eyes at the transparency of it" but it never came up in the show because it was rated Y-7. Throughout the 2000s, Christian fundamentalist groups, such as Focus on the Family, criticized SpongeBob SquarePants, claiming that SpongeBob was gay and that the series was spreading "homosexual propaganda," leading series creator Stephen Hillenburg to describe SpongeBob as asexual, rather than gay. Another scholar argued that characters like SpongeBob SquarePants challenged the "signifiers of traditional masculinity," and noted that SpongeBob was "primarily asexual," but has a traditional wardrobe, and his design uses masculine and feminine signifiers at the same time, and able to fluctuate between "masculine aggression and...feminine positivity." In February 2021, Ralph Farquhar revealed that in The Proud Family, which aired on the Disney Channel from 2001 to 2005, they had to use "code to talk about if Michael was gay, to talk about sexuality" and to be "sort of underhanded about it," and said this changed with the revival/reboot The Proud Family: Louder and Prouder.

In later years, Abbey White of Insider argued that one of the reasons that children's animation were stymied in their attempts to be more inclusive, for decades, was due to Standards and Practices departments within networks, the latter which interpreted rating guidelines and definitions of profanity, indecency, and obscenity by the FCC, to guide their notes to crew working on various animated series. She noted that these departments, as do studio executives, determine whether words such as "pride" or "gay," or other LGBTQ terms, can be shown on onscreen or said by a character. Even so, the story said that while these departments have a huge sway, the conservative pushback to certain shows have led to removal of content, and said that top executives have the power to make changes to increase inclusion. This included comments on Steven Universe by Cartoon Network Standards and Practices Department which informed Rebecca Sugar that Ruby and Sapphire, who fused together as Garnet, could not "kiss on the mouth" and she often had to defend the show's stories and "audience of queer youth."

In another example, in June 2021, it was reported that when the studio producing Mysticons changed the series to center on four teenage girls, Jara brought in more women and queer writers to the show's writing team, who were "responsible for building out an arc between lesbian characters Zarya Moonwolf and Kitty Boon." The report also noted that while he received support from Nickelodeon, and fellow producers, a partner was concerned that the storyline was not "age-appropriate" for young viewers, resulting in the kiss scene being cut, but he fought for their romance to remain included. On the other hand, when Doc McStuffins, featured a lesbian (and interracial) married couple in August 2017, Jeremy Blacklow, GLAAD director of entertainment media, argued that this episode would be a turning point for executives who fear boycotts from conservative groups and called it a "major win for both Disney and preschool series."

On March 10, 2022, Pixar employees argued that "nearly every moment" of openly gay affection was cut due to requests from Disney executives, even if creative teams and Pixar executives objected, arguing that these employees are being barred from creating queer content in animated films. Some critics countered that Pixar also downplayed queer moments in films like Luca and Turning Red. Previously, A.O. Scott argued that the film felt "gay" even if not "explicitly queer," and more ambiguous, while the film's director, Enrico Casarosa, said this was unintentional and that his original vision for the film was to explore the time in a child's life before romance, but welcomed the interpretation after the film's release, also stating: "while I identify with pronouns he/him and I am a straight man, the themes of diversity, acceptance and inclusion in our movie are dear to my heart". It was later reported that a same-sex kiss in Lightyear, was reinstated, with the film featuring the studio's "first-ever on-screen kiss between two characters of the same gender" between Alisha Hawthorne and her wife Kiko. It would later be reported that Disney executives attributed the film's financial failure on the "queer kiss" between two characters.

In September 2024, IGN spoke to ten former Pixar employees, who revealed internal struggles to "avoid LGBTQ themes" in Inside Out 2, requiring edits to the film. Multiple employees, recalled notes given to make the main character in the film, Riley Andersen, appear "less gay," with special care to indicate that the relationship between Val and Riley seemed platonic rather than having any "romantic chemistry." One employee even recalled changes to tone and lighting of specific scenes, saying it was a "lot of extra work to make sure that no one would potentially see them as not straight." The same source added that canonically, Riley is not gay, but it is "kind of inferred based on certain contexts" and that executives tried to play this down at multiple points" in the film, with another former employee saying some executives were "uncomfortable" with queer themes, with insistence these things remain out of the film. Another source said that many of those working at Pixar accepted the fact that there "may never" be a "major gay character in a Pixar movie." Following the film, some felt baited by film's post-credits scene, which did not reveal that Riley is gay, but rather that she burned a rug once. Another reviewer, for The Guardian, stated that "sexuality is entirely absent in the film." Previously, some fans had speculated that Riley would be gay in the film and others believed there was canonical evidence to support this headcanon, once the film had released.

In November 2024, Gizmodo and PinkNews reported that in China, where the series aired on Tencent Video and Bilibili, the scene of Caitlyn Kiramann and Maddie Nolen in the part two of Arcane Season 2 was altered, was a final scene between Caitlyn and Vi in the show's third act. It was stated that in the censored version, the latter scene is more awkward, removing characters "from close-up shots and making them look like they are resting on invisible shoulders" and that the sexual intercourse scene between Caitlyn and Vi was "cut out entirely." The Spanish-language outlet, Vandal, also asserted that a censored version of the series was released in Iran. Polygon also reported that the Moon Girl and Devil Dinosaur season 2 episode "The Gatekeeper", about Brooklyn facing discrimination for being a transgender girl, was shelved by Disney before it aired. Several crew members, like storyboarder Derrick Malick Johnson, asserted on social media that Disney decided not to air the episode because of "which party that won the recent election" which likely referred to the victory of Donald Trump and the Republican Party in the 2024 United States presidential election.

Later reporting by Collider asserted the episode has been on hold for over a year, which had nothing to do with the election results, but that it was unclear if it "will ever be officially released." They also reported that the episode was leaked on YouTube and noted criticism of the decision to not release the episode by storyboarder Emma Cicirega, Amphibia creator Matt Braly, indie animation writer Dave Capdevielle, and The Owl House creator Dana Terrace. English writer Gareth Watkins said, in Aftermath, that the removal of the episode marked the end of "golden age" of LGBTQ Western animation.

In December 2024, Deadline Hollywood reported that Disney removed a storyline related to a transgender character in an episode within a then-upcoming Pixar television series Win or Lose, with the company's spokesperson saying that "when it comes to animated content for a younger audience, we recognize that many parents would prefer to discuss certain subjects with their children on their own terms and timeline" while the character remains in the series, lines of dialogue that referenced gender identity were cut. It was also reported that the decision to cut this storyline had happened "several months ago". Chanel Stewart, the transgender actress who voices the character in question, criticized the decision, calling it "upsetting," disenheartening, and stated that "trans stories matter, and...deserve to be heard" and noted her character would be a "straight cis girl" instead. It was later reported by the San Francisco Chronicle, in March 2026, that Pete Docter, chief creative officer of Pixar, had ordered the removal of the transgender storyline from Win or Lose while Elio was being reworked.

In July 2025, multiple insiders who worked at Pixar told The Hollywood Reporter that Elio, eponymous protagonist of the film with the same name, was originally a "queer coded character" which reflected the identity of Adrian Molina as an openly gay filmmaker and the film's first director, while others said the film was not a "coming out story," with the publication saying that Pixar executives pushed Elio to become "more masculine" and a scene suggesting he had a "male crush" was removed. The publication also noted that after Molina left the film, it was re-worked under new directors Madeline Sharafian and Domee Shi, with some expressing disappointment at changes to the film by these directors, feeling the film had been "destroyed" and was about "absolutely nothing." One former Pixar artist stated that the studio's executives were "constantly sanding down" moments which alluded to Elio's queer sexuality, rather than from Disney itself.

In a March 2026 interview, Docter defended the removal of the LGBTQ storyline from Elio, including reported scenes where Elio imagined living with his male crush and had a pink bike, saying "We're making a movie, not hundreds of millions of dollars in therapy" and asserted that Pixar had found that certain parents did not want entertainment to pressure them into having conversations they were not ready to have with their children, according to the Wall Street Journal. He called for extensive changes to the film, which were made by Sharafian and Shi, following the departure of the film's original director, Molina, when the animation was mostly complete. These changes led to backlash among Pixar staff members during the film's production, disappointed others since Pixar had a "history of supporting LGBT employees," and led to further discouragement after removal of a transgender character from "Win or Lose."

=== Stereotypes and tropes ===
Many Western animated series and films have featured stereotypes and tropes over the years. This included Aladdin, The Beauty and the Beast, The Lion King, and Hercules, The Ambiguously Gay Duo, South Park, Family Guy, and Voltron: Legendary Defender.

Some critics have noted the "sliver of representation" in Disney's film, Aladdin, embodied in characters such as Jafar, created by gay animator Andreas Deja, and singing music by another gay man, Howard Ashman. Some, like filmmaker David Thorpe, would argue that this film associated gay men with villainy, while others would describe Jafar as queer-coded, "polished, sophisticated, and bitingly funny." Gaston previously designed Gaston and LeFou in The Beauty and the Beast (1991). This queer coding, however, had its disadvantages, with networks not wanting to show overt representation. Rebecca Sugar argued that it is "really heavy" for a kid to only exist "as a villain or a joke" in an animated series. Other critics argued that such queer-coded villains as contributing to "homophobic discourse" and equating queerness with evil itself. He would later design Scar in The Lion King (1994), and the title character of Hercules (1997). Others would also describe Scar and John Ratcliffe in Pocahontas as "queer-coded villains" and state that Deja's work on Scar and Hercules would be influential in development of some Disney characters.

The 1990s also featured series such as The Ambiguously Gay Duo, which created by Robert Smigel and J. J. Sedelmaier, and premiered on The Dana Carvey Show. The show follows the adventures of Ace and Gary, voiced by Stephen Colbert and Steve Carell, respectively, two superheroes whose sexual orientation is a matter of dispute, and a cavalcade of characters preoccupied with the question, and is a parody of the stereotypical comic book superhero duo done in the style of Saturday morning cartoons like Super Friends. The shorts are intended to satirize suggestions that early Batman comics implied a homosexual relationship between the eponymous title character and his field partner and protégé Robin, a charge most infamously leveled by Fredric Wertham in his 1954 book, Seduction of the Innocent, the research methodology for which was later discredited. This superhero show aired at the time there were other queer-themed live-action segments, like one of a gay weightlifting pair (Hans and Carvey), the "It's Pat" sketch from 1990 to 1994, which derived much of its humor from "speculation about Pat's gender and sexuality," and comic Terry Sweeney having a role on SNL, becoming the first regular gay performer in television.

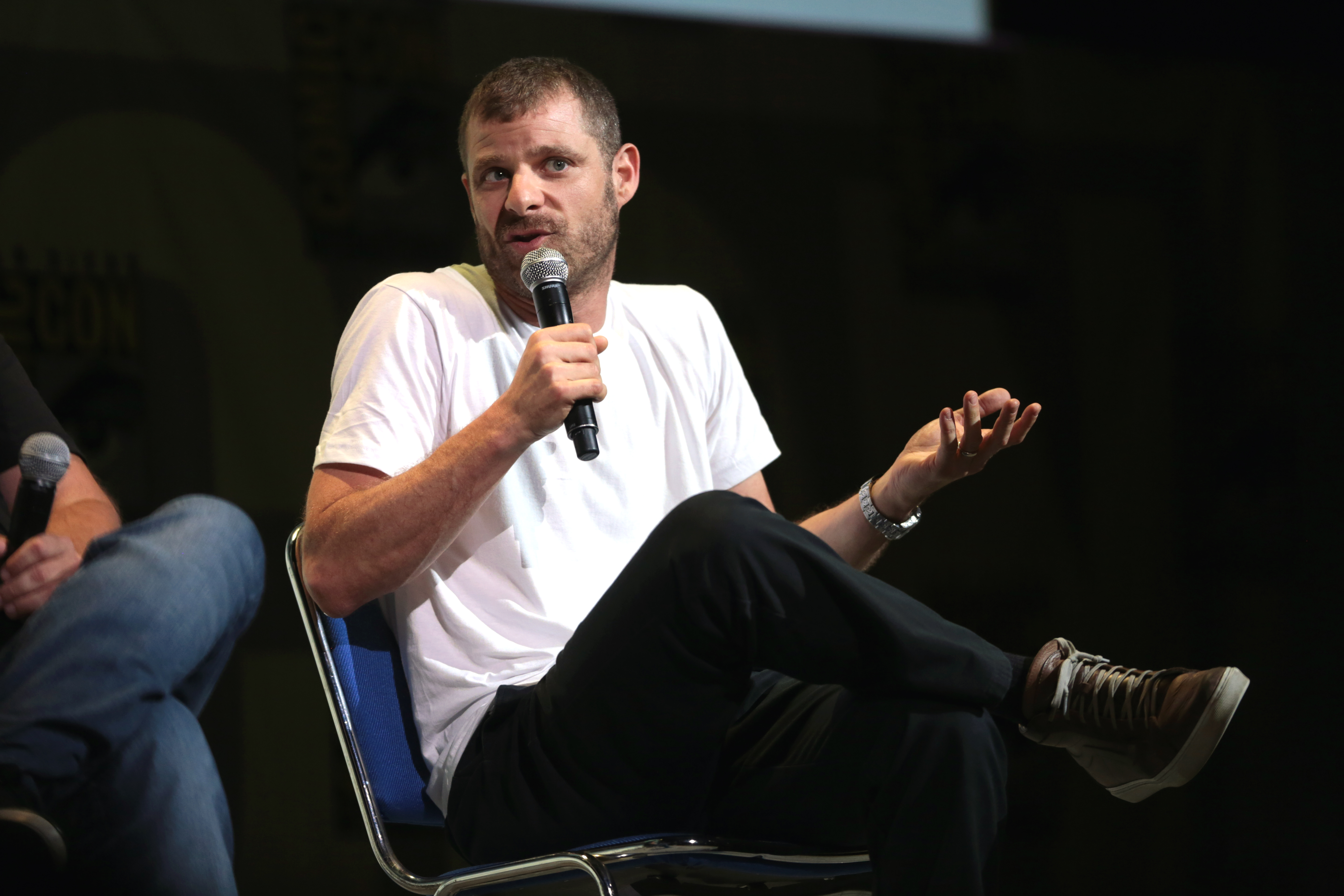
Matt Stone speaking at the 2016 San Diego Comic-Con, for "South Park: Season 20", at the San Diego Convention Center in San Diego, California on July 22, 2016; Stone voiced Big Gay Al, a gay character in South Park.

South Park, created by Trey Parker and Matt Stone, began airing on Comedy Central in August 1997, featured many stereotypical depictions of queer characters. This included a flamboyant homosexual man named Big Gay Al who ran an animal sanctuary with gay animals. In the course of the show, Al would openly display his homosexuality and be an open advocate for gay rights. Some critics would further describe the character as a "stereotypical gay man" who teaches those in South Park about the evils of homophobia through history, educate pet owners on the "evils of homophobia" in his debut episode. Literature and queer studies scholar James Keller would critically analyze the series, noting its moderate liberal beliefs and queer sensibilities, along with homophobic bias, with a laissez-faire approach to LGBTQ discrimination and rights, affecting the show's narrative choices, with the show's three principle gay characters as "caricatures," calling the character a "round, effeminate, oversexed, and scrupulously manicured dance hall queen" acquiesces to the abuses of heterosexism.

Other characters, such as Cartman, were said to occasionally associated with "same-sex desire", along with an unsympathetic relationship between Saddam Hussein and Satan, which emulated a heterosexual couple, and Mr. Slave, a character said to be a gay S&M cliche and "leather queen", who rejects Mr. Garrison, a character who originally presented as a closeted homosexual. Storylines would feature Garrison coming out as a gay man, then having a gender reassignment surgery to become female (known as Janet Garrison), becoming a lesbian, and then changing back to a man. Some scholars stated that characters like Bugs Bunny and Mulan, who cross-dressed, paved the way for characters like Mr./Mrs. Garrison, who described as a "post-op transgender character." Critics, such as Rueben Baron of CBR, argued that although the series made it clear that cartoons are not only for kids, like The Simpsons, but it did not counter the idea that it is "inappropriate to expose kids to the existence of queer people."

Other series were criticized for repeating tropes and stereotypes of queer characters FOX's Family Guy, would be criticized for repeating tropes often associated with LGBTQ+ characters with Ida Davis, a trans woman, introduced in the episode "Quagmire's Dad," an argument repeated by other critics in later years. Davis would later become the "butt of many transmisogynistic and transphobic "jokes."" In January 2019, Family Guy committed to phasing out jokes about the LGBTQ community, which was confirmed by the show's executive producers Alec Sulkin and Rich Appel, along with creator Seth MacFarlane, who stated that they wanted to better reflect the current climate in the show due to societal changes which have seen the jokes become frowned upon over time. However, this was later reversed in an October 2019 episode, in which Peter Griffin stated that the commitment was "taken out of context and widely misunderstood."

Voltron: Legendary Defender, which aired on Netflix from June 2016 to December 2018, featured three gay characters, Shiro and Adam, who broke up, with Adam dying several years later, but at the end of eighth and final season, Shiro is married to Curtis, a background character introduced in Season 8. The series was fraught with criticism for its LGBTQ representation, especially for killing off a gay character, with some saying the show was following a stereotype known as "burying that gay", leading showrunner Joaquim Dos Santos to apologize to fans. The fact that Shiro's partner was killed off in the same episode he was introduced "played into negative tropes and didn't sit well with fans."

=== Cancellations and endings ===
Some series with LGBTQ+ representation have either been cancelled or not-renewed over the years. This included the animated video series Danger & Eggs, Twelve Forever, The Hollow, Hoops, Q-Force, and The Venture Bros. In an article for Bitch, Lena Dean noted that writers and showrunners have wanted to push for onscreen queer representation, but said it still risky. She hoped that in the future there would be "more meaningful representation" especially for transgender, asexual, non-binary, and "queer characters of color," noting that there is such a demand for audiences for this diversity, noting that in the past there were only "background gay characters" which meant that queer people could not see themselves as protagonists.

In June 2017, Amazon Video premiered the animated video series Danger & Eggs, which was co-created by a trans woman named Shadi Petosky, was filled with LGBTQ+ characters, such as a femme "brown-skinned energetic creative" named Reina, and a genderqueer character named Milo In later years, Milo was highlighted as one of the only non-binary characters of color in animation. In February 2018, Petosky felt that the show was in limbo, with the loss of the crew, without "much concern or enthusiasm" about the show, saying it "just slipped through the cracks." She lamented that the show's fate is up the new executive team on the show and predicted the show would probably be cancelled as a result.

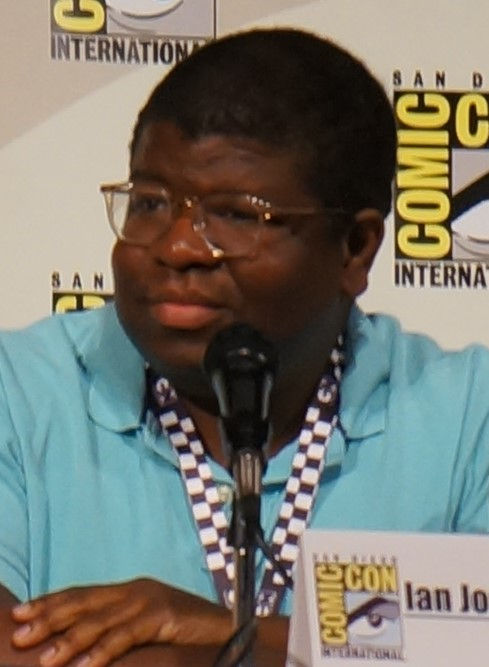
Ian Jones-Quartey at San Diego Comic Con 2013

On August 8, 2019, Ian Jones-Quartey, confirmed that his show, OK K.O.! Let's Be Heroes had been cancelled by Cartoon Network, but would still air a final episode. The series featured LGBTQ themes and LGBTQ characters in the main cast, among supporting characters and other recurring characters. For instance, the series featured two married couples: Lord Boxman and Professor Venomous, two villains, and Joff and Nick Army, two recurring heroes. The series was noted as portraying Boxman and Venomous romantically, and having a couple: Enid, a bisexual ninja and witch, and Red Action, a lesbian, who kissed in the episode "Red Action 3: Grudgement Day". Some reviewers noted that Enid has possible romantic feelings toward Elodie. The series finale, "Thank You for Watching the Show," included a same-sex wedding between Joff and Army. The series was later recognized by Philadelphia Gay News and Out for its LGBTQ representation.

Other series that would not be renewed for additional seasons included Twelve Forever, The Hollow and Hoops. In September 2018, Petosky, one of the executive producers of Twelve Forever would state that because of the show abrupt ending, Shadi Petosky, they would not be able to further explore the queer identity of the protagonist, Reggie. Hoops, which had a gay character named Scott on the school's basketball team, would be cancelled by Netflix after its first season received low ratings and negative reviews. Additional series which were not renewed included Q-Force, a mature comedy about a group of undervalued LGBT superspies, and is centered on a gay secret agent, which was not renewed for a second season (and widely panned by critics), and The Venture Bros., which had been slated to be renewed for an eighth and final season, which was later confirmed by series creator Jackson Publick, with season 8 being axed.

On September 7, 2020, Adult Swim stated that they were working to "find another way to continue the Venture Bros. story"." A number of creators weighed in on the decision. For instance, Owl House creator Dana Terrace criticized the cancellation, as did animator Bryan Brinkman, DuckTales producer Frank Angones, and other fans of the show. A direct-to-video film continuation The Venture Bros.: Radiant Is the Blood of the Baboon Heart was released on July 25, 2023.

On December 11, 2020, a project by Lee Knox Ostertag, for Disney Television Animation under the name Neon Galaxy, was registered. In September 2024, Ostertag announced that Neon Galaxy, a series set "in the distant future," was not moving forward at Disney, noting that it had been cancelled a few months prior despite production work for four and a half years and positive response from "kids who saw materials in early demographic testing" and songs by Betty Who. She also noted that it is a "weird, bad time" in the U.S. animation industry, with difficulty in getting series approved, and hoped The Animation Guild can win gains from the Alliance of Motion Picture and Television Producers during negotiations for a new contract, and said that "for now, this is a farewell" for Neon Galaxy while adding "maybe one day I'll be back." In November 2024, following the leak of the shelved Moon Girl and Devil Dinosaur episode "The Gatekeeper", Ostertag speculated that Neon Galaxy was "killed" because two members of the main cast were openly transgender. In December 2025, in response to The Walt Disney Company inking a three-year licensing deal with Sora (OpenAI) for short AI generated videos on Disney+, Ostertag mentioned that Disney's legal department threatened him for sharing artwork from Neon Galaxy to the public.

On September 17, 2025, Stevenson told Comic Book Club that production of the animated adaptation of Lumberjanes had ended, noting adaptations of the comic went through "many iterations," saying certain issues, including corporate mergers, made working on it "untenable." He noted that the most recent adaptation is "sort of on ice," but opined that it is "a long way from dead" and that he is down to "keep playing with different iterations of it" with the possibility of a stage musical, an RPG, or something else, adding "those conversations are happening. It's just there's nothing solid at this point." The original comic series featured a trans female character named Jo, and two other female main characters: Molly and Mal. They identify as either bisexual or lesbian, and both have requited crushes on each other. Jo would have been, had the animated adaptation been completed, the first trans female main character ever in an animated series geared towards children.

In December 2025, English writer Gareth Watkins said that weak marketing and reduced content output by Netflix (the original home of a large amount of LGBTQ cartoons) combined with the unique challenges of promoting children's media, and the overseas popularity of anime and manga played a role in the decrease of Western-made LGBTQ cartoons.

== Broadcast series ==
=== The Simpsons ===
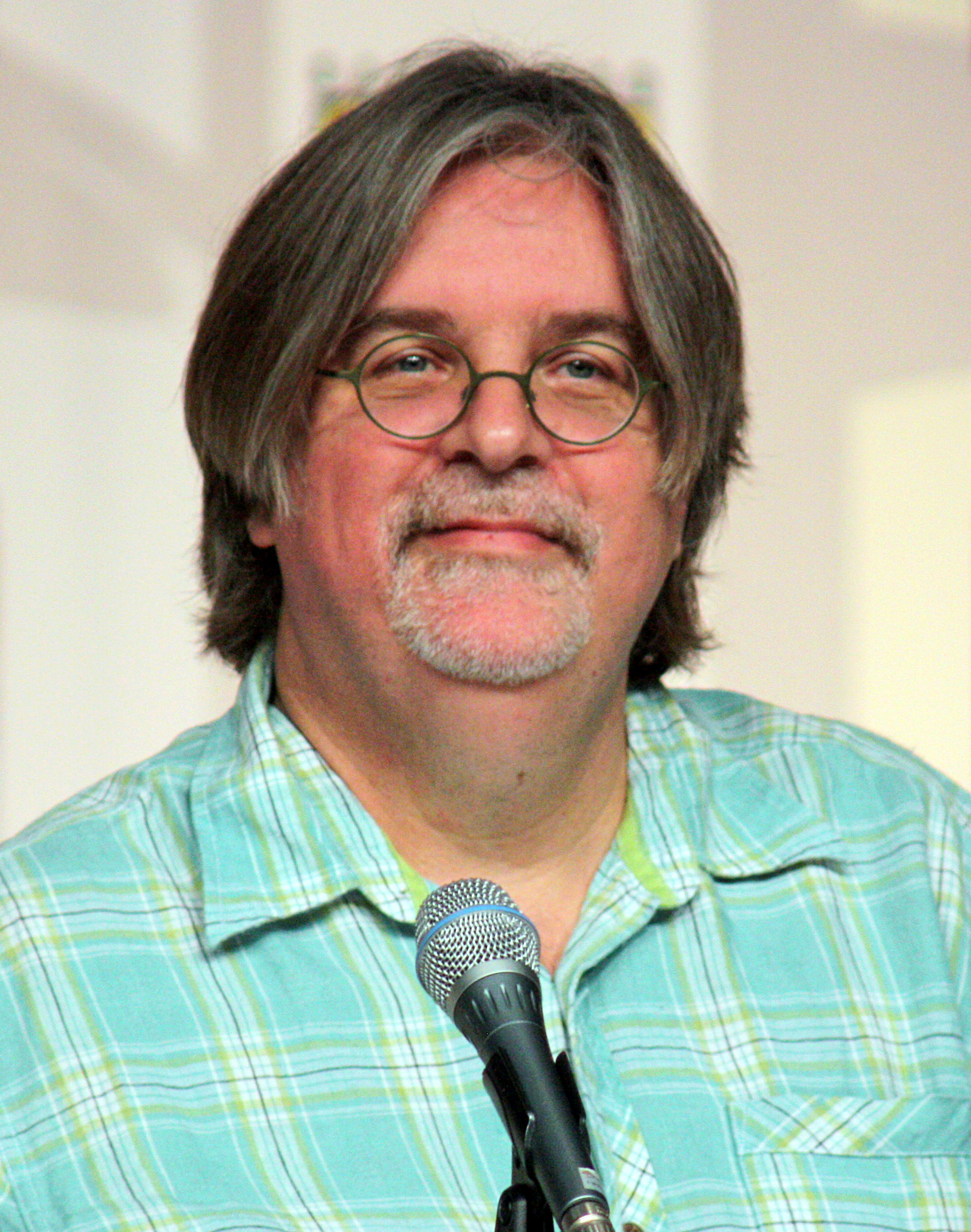
Matt Groening, who created Futurama and The Simpsons, at the 2009 Comic Con in San Diego

On December 17, 1989, the first episode of The Simpsons featured a gay character, Waylon Smithers, named after gay puppeteer Wayland Flowers. He was the first gay character to appear on a U.S. animated show. However, like other shows at the time, The Simpsons approached the subject gingerly, not drawing much attention to the sexuality of Smithers, as he remained in the closet, officially, until 2016. One scholar would call The Simpsons "subversive" for satirizing and challenging social norms, traditional values, and LGBTQ representations. Even so, it was noted that Smithers is frequently dubbed as "Burns-sexual," which is used to hide his sexuality, and he has been passing his whole life, with his remaining in the closet a focus of many sketches and jokes in the show. He would also be described as a weird man who sticks to "his cartoonish closet" and as a person who is infatuated with a "vaguely homophobic" Mr. Burns, with allusions to this attraction beginning to be shown in the show's first season. Another scholar said that the sexuality of Smithers was clear from innuendos, although not explicitly stated, like him kissing Mr. Burns when everyone thinks the world is ending, in the November 1997 episode "Lisa the Skeptic".

Many other characters in The Simpsons were secondary and rarely in positions of power. Waylon Smithers and Patty Bouvier were the only recurring gay characters. In October 1990, a Simpsons episode, titled "Simpson and Delilah," featured a stylish assistant, Karl, who helped Homer, whose sexuality is never mentioned, even though the person voicing him (Harvey Fierstein) is a gay playwright. In the episode, Karl and Homer kiss in what some say is the first animated male-male kiss to air on network television.

Series creator Matt Groening, when asked in a 1991 interview if Karl was gay, said "he's whatever you want him to be" and added that including Karl was "beyond any other cartoon," even though some gay viewers were disappointed that the character did not identify himself as gay. Groening also said there was a lack of gay characters in cartoons due to "virulent homophobia" in U.S. culture and stated that Karl had an unrequited attraction for Homer. Groening was also the cartoonist for the newspaper strip Life in Hell which included a recurring gay couple, named Akbar and Jeff. Later episodes would also feature LGBTQ characters and moments. Homer would visit a lesbian bar with pink Venus symbols and butch-femme couples, in the December 1994 episode "Fear of Flying", and exclaim, "This lesbian bar doesn't have a fire exit! Enjoy your death trap, ladies!", a scene that was a parody of a typical episode of the comedy series Cheers. By 1996, the show was said to have a recurring or well-developed LGBTQ character, like other shows on TV at the time.

A February 16, 1997 The Simpsons episode, titled "Homer's Phobia", featured John Waters, a gay filmmaker, as a gay man who helps Homer Simpson confront his homophobia. The episode also pokes at general homophobia in U.S. society as a whole. The episode came during a time where there were unspoken limits on what LGBTQ content could be shown on TV, with some arguing that "Homer's Phobia" did more, in terms of awareness and exposing intolerance, than "any live action show at the time." Others stated that in the episode Homer learned a "valuable lesson about tolerance" as he said he would be okay with any of Bart's lifestyle choices, and that it took on stereotypes and employing them "even when it foregrounds their patent silliness," including visiting a gay steel mill and only respecting John as a gay man after he saves Bart from an angry reindeer. One scholar, Stephen Tropiano, even rated it as one of the funniest sitcom episodes with LGBTQ themes.

=== Adventure Time ===
Cartoon Network Studios' Adventure Time began airing on Cartoon Network in April 2010. The show introduced viewers to two queer characters: Marceline the Vampire Queen and Princess Bubblegum, with Rebecca Sugar trying to foster the relationship between these two characters through her work on the show, Sugar would face pushback for years from network executives for having Marceline and Bubblegum in Adventure Time together, as they was concerned about "distribution in countries where being gay or lesbian was censored in media and considered a crime." On September 26, 2011, Adventure Time began hinting at romantic subtext between Marcy and Bonnie, called "Bubbline" by fans, with the airing of the episode "What Was Missing".

On September 3, 2018, the season finale of Adventure Time, "Come Along With Me" aired on Cartoon Network, which confirmed Marcy and Bonnie as a couple, as they kissed in the episode. After the episode aired, some would argue that the on-screen confirmation of the same-sex romance showed that the "cartoon landscape has changed during Adventure Time's run," Some said the episode invited viewers to re-examine the past interactions of Bonnie and Marcy "through a queer lens" while impacting the animation world and TV industry. One reviewer, Mey Rude of .them, argued that without the show, there would be no Steven Universe, Clarence, Summer Camp Island, or Rick and Morty. Other critics praised the kiss between Marceline and Bubblegum, calling it "historic" and saying the finale was "more than queerbaiting" but rather a "true romantic relationship."

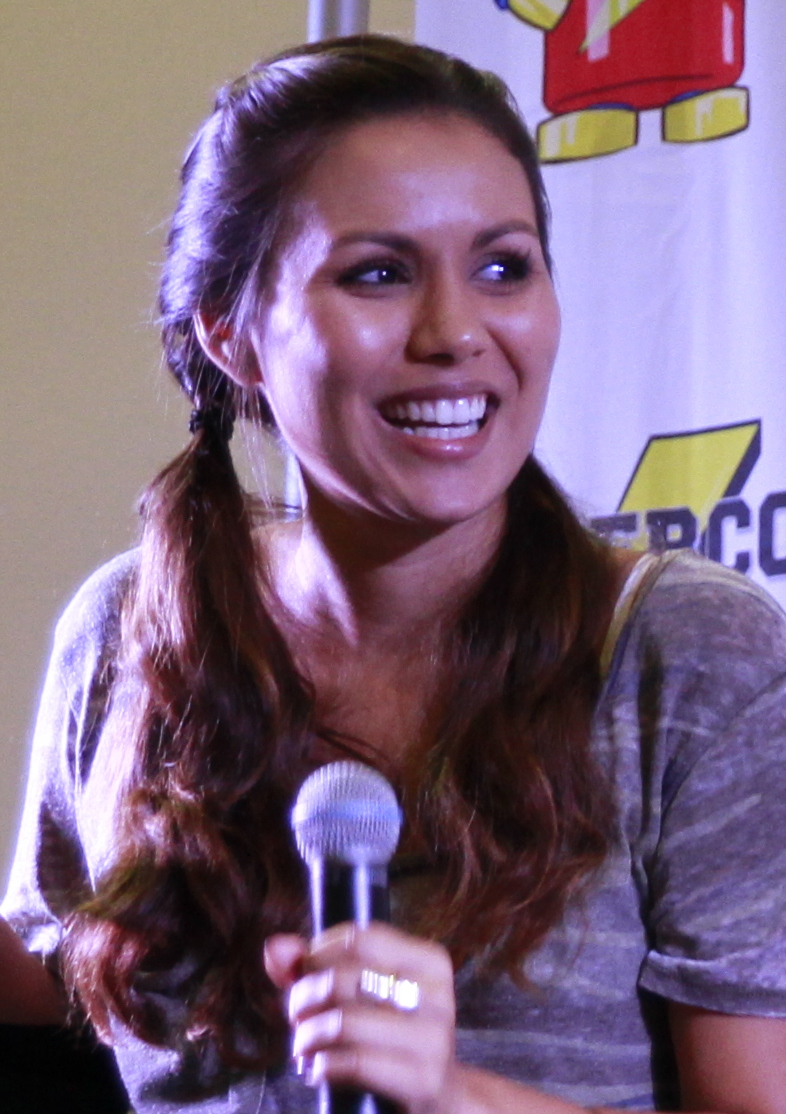
Olivia Olson at the Florida Supercon in 2016; Olson voices Marceline in Adventure Time: Distant Lands

The Adventure Time: Distant Lands series, the name for four hour-long streaming television specials based on the American animated television series Adventure Time, which began streaming on HBO Max, expanded on the story of Marceline and Bonnibel. The second episode of that series, "Obsidian," brought together Marceline, Princess Bubblegum, and Glassboy, the latter who is voiced by Michaela Dietz, who voiced Amethyst in Steven Universe. In this special, Marcy, living with Bonnie, is anxious about revisiting the Glass Kingdom as it holds bad memories, but she and Bonnie are forced to confront this "rocky past" as they face off against an ancient, dangerous, and powerful dragon. Some critics, such as Laura Prudom for Pride.com, described Bonnie and Marcy living a "happy, gay life together" which they always deserved, and predicted that the series would be full of "action, brand new songs, and classic Adventure Time weirdness and heart". Rebecca Long wrote, for Polygon, that the episode gives fans the "emotional payoff and answers" they have been yearning for and that the special uses the plot to explore Marceline's childhood trauma, her romantic history with Bubblegum, how the two are interconnected, and fills in gaps about her past. Other critics, such as Rosie Knight for IGN, gave a similar assessment.

=== Steven Universe ===
In November 2013, Cartoon Network Studios' Steven Universe began airing on Cartoon Network. The show would focus on a half-human, half-Gem child named Steven Universe, who is raised by three non-binary space aliens: Pearl, Garnet (a fusion of Ruby and Sapphire), and Amethyst, which are female-presenting, using she/her pronouns, in a non-traditional family, with Steven's father, Greg, living in a van and running a car wash. While Rebecca Sugar, whose series built upon her work on Adventure Time in the years prior, had received direct notes about LGBTQ characters in her show, Steven Universe in previous years, in 2015, the studio executives told her that while she had a choice to make Ruby and Sapphire LGBTQ, some countries might pull back the series and the series itself could be cancelled. In 2016, Sugar came out as bisexual at San Diego Comic-Con and started to speak more openly on LGBTQ issues in Steven Universe and in the industry. She later said she had to come out because it was hard for her to "try and make heteronormative art." As a result, Sugar began advocating more for her characters.

In July 2018, the Steven Universe episode "Reunited" aired, becoming the "first gay proposal and wedding episode," and making "kids' animation history." The episode was praised for its execution, focus on the show's core themes, and queer representation. At the 2019 Creative Arts Emmy Awards, the episode was nominated for Outstanding Short-Format Animated Program, In December 2019, the limited epilogue series, Steven Universe Future began airing on Cartoon Network. The series included a one-time non-binary character named Shep (voiced by Indya Moore), the romantic interest of Sadie. The series showed a character, Bismuth, have a crush on Pearl in the episode "Bismuth Casual."

On September 2, 2019, Steven Universe: The Movie premiered on Cartoon Network. It included Ruby, Sapphire, and Pearl, lesbian characters from the original Steven Universe series. In the film, after Spinel rides in to Earth on a planet-destroying weapons and attacks Steven Universe and the other three Crystal Gems (Pearl, Garnet, and Amethyst), causing all them to be "rejuvenated" into their original forms. While Steven works with his friends to bring back the memories of Pearl and Amethyst, he also recreates the moment which brought Ruby and Sapphire together into Garnet, and is successful in restoring Garnet first to "cotton candy" form, then to her original self. Garnet also sings a song about love, titled "Isn't It Love?". Furthermore, in the process of getting Amethyst and Steven work together to get her memories back, including Amethyst transforming into Rose, who she calls Pearl's "love of her life."

=== Legend of Korra ===
On December 19, 2014, The Legend of Korra, a Nickelodeon show, aired their season finale, which showed Korra and Asami holding hands, showing they are in a relationship. As such, the show became one of the first western children's animation series to not only feature major LGBT characters, but also a lead LGBT character. One of the show creators, Michael Dante DiMartino confirmed Korra and Asami as having romantic feeling together, while the other show creator Bryan Konietzko said he was "very proud' of the ending, and that while he loved "how their relationship arc took its time," there was a limit to how much they could go with in the show. He also hoped that the show would move LGBTQ representation forward.

In the aftermath of series finale, which aired on Nickelodeon and Nick.com, there were debates about "queer representation in children's media." Some, such as Mey Rude of Autostraddle, noted that while the relationship between two bisexual characters, Korra and Asami, was built up during the course of the series, the words "I love you" were never uttered, nor did the characters kiss. Lena Dean of Bitch described the episode "a romantic ending for...a canon couple made up of two bisexual women": Korra and Asami, but criticized that while a kiss was implied, it was "not allowed on screen by Nickelodeon." The relationship between Korra and Asami was also portrayed in the later comics, such as The Legend of Korra: Turf Wars, with commenters and reviewers, such as Doug Madison of the Washington Post and Zosha Millman of Vulture, stating that the series paved the path for further queer representation.

=== The Owl House ===
In January 2020, The Owl House began airing on the Disney Channel. The show dropped subtext and hints that several characters within the show are LGBTQ+. The series openly presented and confirmed Disney's first animated LGBT+ female non-recurring character: Luz Noceda. She would later enter a relationship with Amity Blight, as shown in episodes like "Through the Looking Glass Ruins" and "Knock, Knock, Knockin' on Hooty's Door", with both praised as "fleshed-out characters" by Mey Rude of Out and Jade King of TheGamer. Luz would later come out to her mother as bisexual in the third-season episode "Thanks to Them".

The series would also feature a non-binary character named Raine Whispers, who goes by they/them pronouns and is voiced by transgender and non-binary actor Avi Roque, and is Disney's first non-binary character. The series finale would reveal King's father "Papa Titan" to be bigender as he refers to himself as both a king and queen. The series would be described, prior to its final season, by Randy Jones of Them, as making "queer Disney history" having a legacy that would "be remembered."

On October 5, 2021, in an AMA on Reddit, Dana Terrace, the creator of The Owl House, explained the show was cancelled not because of ratings or COVID-19 pandemic but rather because businesspeople at Disney believed it did not fit "into the Disney brand." She stated that this was the case due to the serialized nature of the show and an audience which "skews older," rather than due to its LGBTQ+ representation, saying she would not "assume bad faith" against those she works with in Los Angeles. She also noted that due to the pandemic, budgets were constrained, episodes were cut, and noted that she was not allowed to present a case for a fourth season, and said she believed there was a future for the show if Disney Television had "different people in charge."

== Streaming series ==
=== Bojack Horseman ===
BoJack Horseman, airing from 2014 to 2020 on Netflix, featured a number of LGBTQ+ characters. For instance, Hollyhock, a female teenage horse and Bojack's sister, has eight adoptive fathers (Dashawn Manheim, Steve Mannheim, Jose Guerrero, Cupe Robinson III, Otto Zilberschlag, Arturo "Ice Man" Fonzerelli, Gregory Hsung, and Quackers McQuack) in a polyamorous gay relationship. Todd Chavez in the season 3 finale, "That Went Well," Todd confides in his friend Emily that he does not think he is either straight or gay, and in fact "might be nothing". He explores the identity further in season 4 and accepts his asexuality, while meeting others who share his orientation.

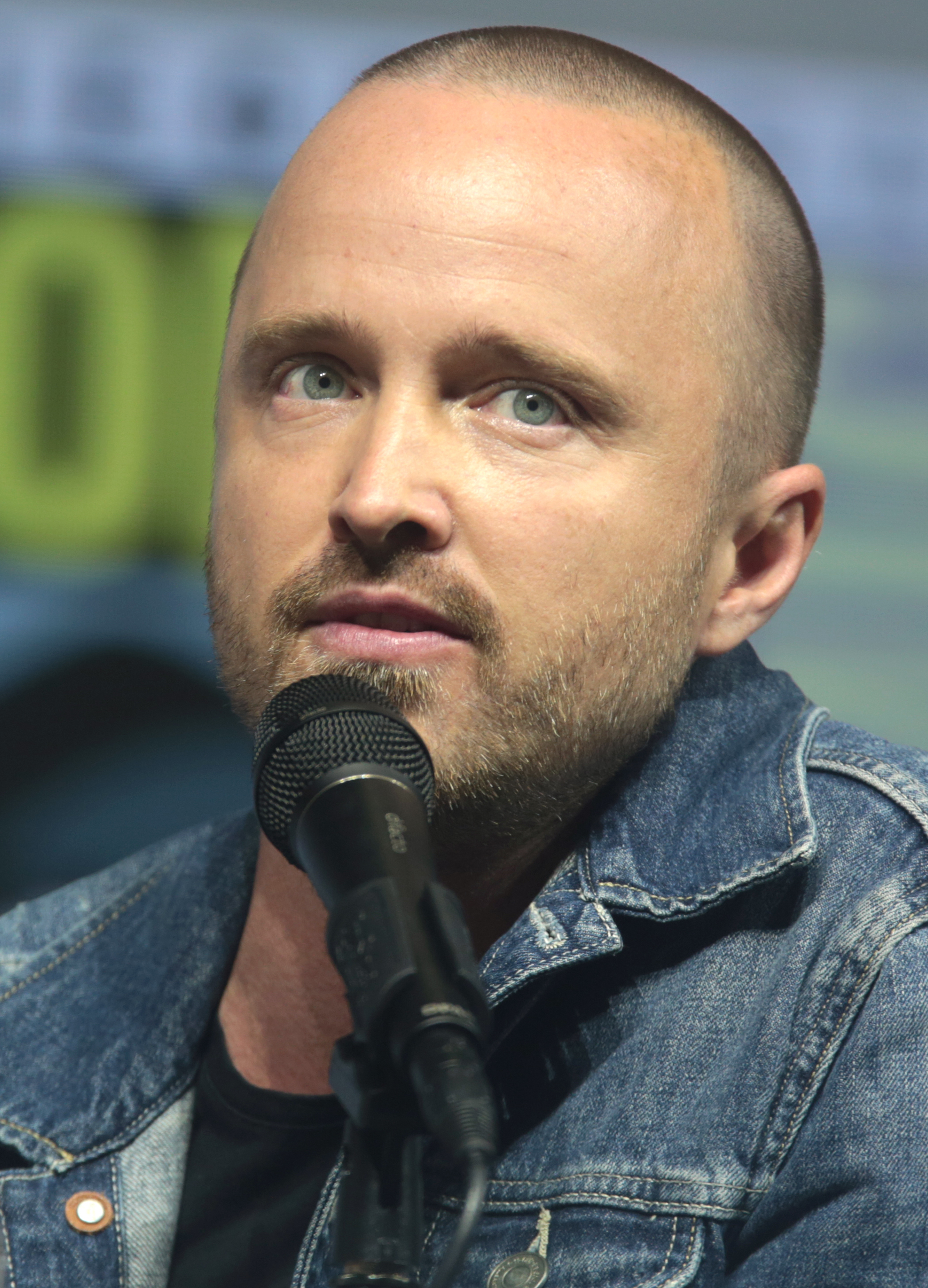
Aaron Paul in 2018; Paul voiced Todd Chavez in Bojack Horseman

Todd's character was received positively. Them called the character "deeply relatable" and said the series was willing to "examine asexuality in an unprecedented way", including the inclusion of Yolanda Buenaventura as another asexual character, and they enter a relationship with one another, while shedding some light on "some of the nuances of asexuality and dating," then their relationship later ends. CBR described Todd as "unique and meaningful representation", opposing harmful asexual stereotypes present in Sherlock and Dexter, and addresses "preexisting assumptions" about asexual people. The Mary Sue praised Todd for being a realistic portrayal of sexuality, calling it "nothing short of mind-boggling" and argued there was "still a lot of room to explore Todd's asexuality". Affinity Magazine argued that the series thoughtfully portrayed asexuality, specifically through Todd's character, and stated that series brought asexual issues to the fore "because asexual people have stories that deserve to be told."

MovieWeb, The Ringer, and Vox were praiseworthy, saying the series handles asexuality "perfectly", is a "realistic, understated depiction," and "changed asexual representation forever", while comparing it to other series, noting that Todd finds a support group "once he comes out". Spotlight Journal was more critical, saying that asexual characters in the series "perpetuate some of the most common and unreasonable stereotypes of asexual people, distorting the public's perspective", such as Todd's girlfriend, Yolanda, and second partner Maude, both of which are asexual, calling them "manic pixie dream girls" and saying that Todd's character reinforces some stereotypes. The voice actor of Todd, Aaron Paul, also told BuzzFeed that he was proud to represent the asexual community and noted asexual fans of the show who were grateful for his character. Vivienne Medrano, creator of Hazbin Hotel and Helluva Boss, in an interview with Polygon, said that the series changed how she thought about expressing themes and character development in mature animation. Sarah E. S. Sinwell and Danielle Girard analyze Todd's asexuality, arguing his complex character helps challenge heteronormative norms on television.

=== Big Mouth ===
In October 2018, a protagonist in Big Mouth, Jay Bilzerian, came out as bisexual. The same year, Ali, a pansexual character, was introduced. Some, like Emily L. Stephen of The A.V. Club, criticized Ali's character as an oversimplification of the "relationship between private parts and gender identity," even as her existence was praised as putting the show ahead of "most television representations of sexual expression". Others, such as Addissyn House of Bitch, praised the show has talking "honestly about sexuality, puberty, and desire for all genders", Following a negative audience response, in October 2019, series co-creator Andrew Goldberg took responsibility for their misstep in the episode, saying they "missed the mark here with this definition of bisexuality vs. pansexuality" and said that thanked the trans, pan, and bi communities for "further opening our eyes to these important and complicated issues of representation" and said that he, and the other crew "are listening and we look forward to delving into all of this in future seasons."

The series LGBTQ representation received a mixed reception. Rachel Charlene Lewis of Bitch, criticized the show for misrepresenting pansexuality, Later, she stated that the fourth season made up for past "queer missteps", noted that the series "embraced LGBTQ storylines" from the beginning, and called it "one of the best queer series on TV right now." SYFY's Kayleigh Donaldson said that although the series had a "great depiction of discovering one's bisexuality" in the third season, the introduction of Ali, and her explanation of pansexuality was "neither funny nor accurate." Justin Kirkland praised, in Esquire, the gay character of Matthew (voiced by Andrew Rannells), saying the series managed to make his character and realistic, calling it "a feat in itself for an animated series."

Reviewers responded more positively to the show's fourth season. Samantha Lewis of Them called the trans character Natalie, a "close-to-ideal representation of trans life on screen." Natalie's voice actor, Josie Totah, later told the same publication that it was an "amazing privilege" to tell Natalie's story "so authentically and beautifully and in a funny way," pushing back against casual transphobia. Diane Anderson-Minshall of The Advocate highlighted the work of Brandon Kyle Goodman, a Black non-binary writer for the series, and noted he will write for the series spin-off Human Resources, and voice a character on that series, with Goodman explaining how was drawn to the series, and saw it as a place to unpack trauma of being "a Black queer teenager in a lot of cis, het, white spaces." The New York Times also did a profile on Goodman, noting that he voices a "queer lovebug" named Walter in the series, and quoted him as saying that wanted the chance to "play with all the colors in the crayon box of humanity instead of being sidelined as a trope."

=== Harley Quinn ===
The series Harley Quinn included various LGBTQ characters. In the May 2020 episode of the series, "There's No Place to Go But Down", Harley Quinn saved her partner-in-crime, Poison Ivy, both kissed each other after they escaped from prison. The critic who reviewed the episode, Renaldo Metadeen of CBR, stated that Harley and Poison's romance is "slow burn" one, adding that this love affair could turn into a "more realistic exploration of how it feels to fall in love with a friend or to have an awkward hookup with a workmate." In another episode, Clayface, a member of Harley's villain crew, was revealed as gay character who had a crush on a male student. Previously, in the DC Universe, Harley Quinn (Dr. Harleen Quinzel) and Poison Ivy (Dr. Pamela Isley) started as friends, but after Harley and Ivy referred to themselves with nicknames, writers gave them more intimate moments together, but did not make them a romantic couple.

In June 2020, the season 2 finale of the series, Poison Ivy had her wedding with Kite Man, a person she did not love, interrupted. By the end of the episode, Harley Quinn and Ivy realize their feelings for each other, kissing and "finally embracing that they're soul mates" as Renaldo Metadeen of CBR put it. Heather Hogan at Autostraddle added that the bisexual love of Poison and Harley is canon, calling the second season "one of the most gratifying gay seasons of television" she has ever watched. Another reviewer, Sophie Perry, writing for a lesbian lifestyle magazine, Curve, noted how that She-Ra and the Princesses of Power and Harley Quinn both had same-sex kisses, happening within stories which could have turned out to be "typical queerbaiting" but did not.

In 2021, the series was nominated for a GLAAD Media Award for Outstanding Comedy Series. Other reviewers, like Carly Lane of SYFY, noted that before the series the "will-they-won't-they, on-again-off-again dynamic" defined the relationship between Harley and Ivy, but that this series evolves the relationship between them gradually and becoming a romance, describing this as "more refreshing." Stacey Henley of TheGamer later described the series as "for the gays" and Seattle Times said the series got some of the most attention of DC titles, as Harley "navigates her...relationship with Poison Ivy" and an associated comic book title. Amanda Hurwitz of GLAAD described the series as "must-see LGBTQ TV," with the third season following "the escapades of...Harley...and her partner-in-crime Poison Ivy...as they rise to power in Gotham, and ultimately, fall in love," with the third season having them as the "new power couple of DC villainy."

=== Arcane ===
On November 7, 2021, Arcane, premiered on Netflix. Overton told The Gamer that they hinted at queerness in the series, only leaving it as subtext, and noted that series creator called for removing the line "'you're hot, cupcake" from the fifth episode, saying she could only say it with her looks alone, but said that she wanted to keep it in, he agreed, and she called it "one of the touchstones" of the relationship between Vi and Caitlyn. Vi later moves in with Caitlyn, and in the show's ninth episode, Vi's sister, Jinx, describes Caitlyn as Vi's girlfriend. Reviewers critically reviewed the series. Nico Dayo of Polygon said that the series did not do enough to commit to LGBTQ characters, saying it uses "queer aesthetics" and "queer coding" instead, with any overt gay behavior only occurring in bawdy houses, behind closed doors, and argued that Caitlyn and Vi are assumed to be queer, but this is "couched in vagueness." Stacey Henley of TheGamer was also critical, arguing that there is a "piece of transphobia" in the series, noting a sex worker implied to be a trans woman briefly shown. The show was renewed for a second season on November 20.

Other reviewers were more positive. Jade King of TheGamer said the connection between Vi and Caitlyn becomes a "serious queer relationship," and praised the show's final act for "developing their romantic bond," while also saying that the show's fandom is by and for gay people, and positively receiving the third act of the show's first season. Chloe Barnes of Collider said that the series delivered "on the foundations of LGBT characters". Arianne Binette of Film-Cred said that although there was discussion that some believed that the series was "queerbaiting the queer audience," because their relationship was not directly stated from the start, that this claim is inaccurate. Xan Indigo of Screen Rant argued that the "touching romance between two women" during the series fixes issues from the League of Legends video games.

Prior to the release of the second, and final, season, Vi's voice actor, Hailee Steinfeld, said that the relationship, in the first and second seasons, between Vi and Caitlyn is beautiful and complex," with push and pull between then, adding "one minute, they might stand for the same thing and be in agreement, and then there's conflict" while noting that Vi leans on Caitlyn "immensely and trusts her and almost defers to her, and they make a great team." Rafael Motomayor for IGN noted that in the first arc of the season, Caitlyn's voice actor, Leung, portrayed "the subtle ways" the character's outlook had "been impacted by...her time with Vi". Reviewers for CNET and Screen Rant noted that although Caitlyn and Vi have a kiss which "will delight the fanbase" both part ways after a disagreement, with Vi pursuing a "dark path." Jade King of TheGamer and Laura Bergin of PC Games N described the relationship of Caitlyn with a fellow enforcer named Maddie Nolden in the second arc, and called Caitlyn "angry" and aimless without Vi. Both end their relationship, and it is revealed, in the series finale, "The Dirt Under Your Nails", that Maddie is revealed as a double agent for Ambessa, who betrays Caitlyn. In the same episode, she is killed due to Mel's magic. Maddie's voice actor, Katy Townsend, later told The Direct that she knew that the relationship between Maddie and Caitlyn would be controversial, noted that the writer of the episode "Paint the Town Blue", Amanda Overton, told her that "this is gonna cause all kinds of chaos," and further said that even though she is a fan of the Caitlyn/Vi pairing, she "underestimated the extent [of] the chaos that this would cause." She also told the publication that the relationship was not Maddie's responsibility, but that Cait "has a lot to answer for her own choices and decisions" as well.

Reviewers for Screen Rant and GameRant noted that the final part of the second season provided many fans with a necessary payoff which included a "passionate sex sciene" between Vi and Caitlyn, describing the latter as symbolic since they first met in a prison, and said that the series fulfilled fan expectations. Series writer Christian Linke later revealed that the sex scene between Vi and Cait, which was one minute and 37 seconds long, was cut short to prevent the series from getting "an even more mature rating." Some, like Isiah Colbert of Gizmodo, called for the longer cut to be released, with Linke playfully stating that the cut is "probably on some French hard drive." Colbert said that the love scene is being regarded by some queer fans as akin to the Korrasami ship between Korra and Asami Sato in The Legend of Korra.

=== She-Ra and the Princesses of Power ===
In November 2018, She-Ra and the Princesses of Power premiered on Netflix. Prior to its release, it was announced this reboot of She-Ra: Princess of Power would include LGBTQ characters, Reviewers for Tor.com, Toon Boom, and EW would describe the series reading "utterly queer in just about every aspect" and the "queer romance" manifested by the Adora-Catra relationship. The series would also be praised for its transgender characters, like Double Trouble, who was voiced by Double Trouble's voice actor is non-binary, like the character, and its "multiseason queer story arc", which were seeded throughout the series by Stevenson, so it would be "too late for higher-ups to stop it."

On May 15, 2020, the final season of She-Ra and the Princesses of Power premiered on Netflix. According to series creator ND Stevenson, the season has "a core of optimism to it" with the characters discovering who "they are and following the path that each of them has." David Opie of Digital Spy added that the show's season five finale changed TV with a "groundbreaking moment". In March 2021, Stevenson told Vanity Fair that early in the show's run there "had to be plausible deniability" around most queer relationships, but this changed once he got "positive, vocal support from fans of the show" who picked up on queer subtext and wanted more. This enabled Stevenson to sell executives on the idea that the "queer relationship between the two leads [was] to be the climax of the entire show."

In an interview with Nerdist in May 2021, Stevenson said that he wanted to represent points of view not usually seen in media, trying to explore them while being as "honest and as real as possible," adding that although crafting queer representation is different from "studio to studio, show to show," people who want such representation have to approach it "without any fear," and added that sometimes people hold back because they are scared and called for increased LGBTQ+ representation. In June 2021, Stevenson told Insider that while the show's staff had a "good number of trans and nonbinary crew," criticism from some of Double Trouble as a villain and a "nonbinary character whose gender nonconformity was conflated with...alienness," blindsided him, admitting he "might have done some things differently," had he known of this perspective.

=== Kipo and the Age of Wonderbeasts ===
Kipo and the Age of Wonderbeasts aired on Netflix from January to October 2020. It became a shining example of expanded representation. In the first season of Kipo, which streamed on January 10, 2020, Benson said he was gay, noting he only liked the series protagonist, Kipo, in a platonic way. He developed a crush on a male character, Troy, in the show's 10th episode. Benson has been described as the "first kids' animated character to directly identify as gay in dialogue." Insider also stated that Benson became the "first Black lead character" and the second-known animated kids character, apart from a character in 6teen, to identify as gay "in dialogue." Later, show creator Rad Sechrist also hinted at Troy being pansexual, but it was never confirmed in the show.

Reviewers have critically examined the show's LGBTQ characters and themes. Charles Pulliam-Moore of Gizmodo described the show as having "casual queerness," with Kipo not seeing him coming out as "major turning point" in her friendship with Benson, and states that the show's queerness differs from Steven Universe in that it is not "central to the story being told." Laura Dale of SYFY described Benson coming out directly and saying he is gay as "an all-too-rare occurrence" in children's animation, comparing it to depictions in Steven Universe and The Legend of Korra ending, arguing that Benson's moment is not a hug deal, but not completely ignored by Kipo, who supports her friend and acknowledges his gay identity, and notes that the series does not stop from showing Benson having "romantic feelings on screen" for another male character. Renaldo Metadeen of CBR argued that the LGBTQ arc in Kipo is better than the arcs in Voltron: Legendary Defender involving Shiro and Adam, and She-Ra and the Princesses of Power as related to Catra and Adora, stating that the relationship between Troy and Benson develops and they begin dating, celebrating and enjoying each other, without their characters "falling into stereotypes."

=== High Guardian Spice ===
In October 2021, the creator of High Guardian Spice, Raye Rodriguez, a Cuban-American trans man, was described as being "passionate about telling diverse and inclusive stories" and noted as wanting to share "fantastical stories about queer, diverse and relatable characters," implying that such characters would be in the series. The series included various LGBTQ characters. Most prominently this included Professor Caraway, a professor at the High Guardian Academy. Voiced by Rodriguez, he reveals in the third episode "Transformations", that he is a trans man. The show also includes LGBTQ cast members like trans woman Julia Kaye (who voices Snapdragon), gay man Cam Clarke (who voices Neppy Cat and Sorrel), and ambiguously queer Julian Koster (who voices Slime Boy).

In a November 2021 interview, Rodriguez noted the importance of representation, and voiced optimism for inclusivity in animation, praising Steven Universe for breaking "so many boundaries." He also stated that the series centers on four girls who are not princesses or chosen ones, but go on adventures, and said it is inspired by a lot of his close friendships. He further praised Crunchyroll for not having any pushback to LGBTQ representation in the show, even though there is homophobia and transphobia in the show's world, adding that in that world, "people are generally a lot more chill about LGBTQ+ people than they are in real life."

Previously, creator Sara Eissa talked about a pitch for her show, Astur's Rebellion, an action-adventure, claiming it was rejected "due to bias against elements of diversity such as POC and LGBTQ+ main characters." She implied that she was talking about Crunchyroll, and its then-upcoming show High Guardian Spice. She also talked about discourse around "diverse" in the animation industry, especially those pitching "future shows," stating that the company (presumably Crunchyroll) would look at a show with "diversity" like people of color, female cast, brighter tones, and "not give it a chance" because it would not be profitable.

=== Dead End: Paranormal Park ===
On August 17, 2020, Margaret Evans interviewed Hamish Steele, creator of Dead End: Paranormal Park, about LGBTQ characters in his show. Steele explained that he is grateful for showrunners who fought for LGBTQ characters in their shows, adding that there was "absolutely no pushback from Netflix about representation," while describing Barney Guttman as a trans male character. He also hoped that the show will help out "more trans creators getting their chance to tell their stories" while hinting at other LGBTQ characters in the show apart from Barney, noting the performance of Miss Coco Peru on the show as Pauline Phoenix.

After the series had released, in June 2022, on Netflix, Steele described the series as "a YA kids' show," said they tried their best to "cast authentically," and said that unlike other series, Dead End treats bigotry as a "serious issue" that affects people, and that they explored the nuances of queer relationships. He later told Gayming magazine that although Barney's identity is important, he does not want to be seen as "the trans show," added that Netflix was only channel "looking to make a show with a trans lead" but that he disagrees with the streaming service's push for specials by Dave Chappelle and Ricky Gervais. In another interview, he stated that Netflix pushed them to make the show the crew wanted, adding it was "not a compromised vision in any way." In an interview with Zach Barack, who voices Barney, he said he loves being trans, glad his Twitter timeline was "flooded with kind things about trans people and what it meant to them" and that it was cool for his "mentions to be so wonderful for a while," said he would work with Steele again, noted that the show's writers, from what he heard, "mostly queer and created a really wonderful space together," and talked about his experience preparing for Barney's scene in which he comes out as trans to Norma.

Following the series release, the series was praised for its LGBTQ representation. Laura Zornosa of Time noted that the series, and Wendell & Wild, both featured the use of animation to reclaim horror genre for trans and queer people, noting that in Dead End, the Paranormal Park is the safe haven for the protagonist, Barney, ad that he meets many other odd characters at the park, including Logan "Logs" Nguyen, who has a mutual crush on him, with most of the characters "either overtly queer or queer-coded," with many trans people, such as story revisionist Ash Wu, working on the series to ensure it portrays their stories accurately. Jade King of TheGamer described the series as "delightfully queer" while criticizing Netflix for canceling queer shows, while Kristy Puchko of Mashable said the series is a "kinetic and heartwarming adventure cartoon" which is proudly queer, and compared it to Gravity Falls, as did Dana da Silva of CBR. Charles Pulliam-Moore of The Verge described the show's first season as an example of what queer creators can do when "given the resources and freedom to tell their own stories." Barry Levitt of The Daily Beast argued that the series "repudiates stereotypical representations of gender dysphoria," while Nathan Maizels of Collider called the series a "queer Scooby-Doo", echoing themes in Scooby-Doo Where Are You!. Mike Deitz of Salon said that the series explores theme parks as "queer getaways" and ripping away "gender norms and presentations".

=== RWBY ===
RWBY has featured various LGBTQ characters. This included Yang Xiao Long and her teammate Blake Belladonna, who previously had an abusive boyfriend named Adam Taurus, who they kill together. Both grow romantically closer as the series continued, and confessed to each other in the Volume 9 episode "Confessions Within Cumulonimbus Clouds", confesses her own feelings, and both kiss.

Some reviewers, like Diane Darcy of CBR, argued that canonizing Bumbleby is not only a high point for the series, but challenges stereotypes of bisexual people, and noted Blake's previous attraction to Sun Wukong and notes hints that Yang finds boys in Beacon Academy "sexually attractive." This was also reflected in the spinoff anime series, RWBY: Ice Queendom and in Justice League x RWBY: Super Heroes & Huntsmen, with Bumbleby moments naturally added to the film. Previously, fans and reviewers either shipped them as "Bumbleby" after the episode "Burning the Candle", as did Blake's voice actor Arryn Zech, and the voice actor of Weiss Schnee, Kara Eberle.

Otherwise, Kdin Jenzen, the voice actor for May Marigold, talked about confirmation of May as trans on screen in the December 19, 2020 RWBY episode, "War", the eighth episode of Volume 8 of RWBY. "I think my favorite part of May Marigold's story, overall, is that she found herself before she found herself," Jenzen, who is a trans woman herself, told CBR in January 2021.

=== Hazbin Hotel and Helluva Boss ===
In October 2019, Vivienne "VivziePop" Medrano released an animated production with LGBTQ+ characters. The first of these productions was Hazbin Hotel which introduced a gay pornstar named Angel Dust, a bisexual character named Charlie, a lesbian character named Vaggie, and an asexual character named Alastor.

On November 25, the pilot episode of Helluva Boss, set in the same universe as Hazbin Hotel was released on YouTube. The series would begin its first season in October 2020. It would also feature various LGBTQ characters. On October 31, 2020, the first season of Medrano's Helluva Boss would be released on YouTube. Helluva Boss has various LGBTQ characters, including a bisexual demon named Moxxie.

The first season of Hazbin Hotel would be released on Prime Video from January 19, 2024 to February 2, 2024. It would be praised by Erik Piepenburg of the Los Angeles Times for having a show universe that is "brazenly colorful, queer-inclusive and fast-paced mishmash", and multiple female and queer leads by Petrana Radulovic of Polygon. Following its release, Hazbin Hotel set a new streaming record for Prime Video, becoming the largest global debut in viewership for a new animated title on the platform.

== Animated films ==
=== Mulan ===
In June 1998, Mulan, an animated musical adventure film would begin showing in theaters. The film would include a bisexual captain Li Shang (voiced by BD Wong). Shang, in the film, loved Mulan when she was disguised as a male alter ego named Ping, and in her true form as a woman. However, Shang was not included in the 2020 live-action remake. One of the film's producers, Jason Reed, said that Shang was dropped in response to the Me Too movement, arguing that "having a commanding officer that is also the sexual love interest was very uncomfortable and we did not think it was appropriate". This was met with social media backlash from fans of the original film and members of the LGBTQ community, with Reed initially surprised by criticism of Shang's removal, but acknowledged that the character had become an "LGBTQ icon." He added that Shang's role would be served by two new characters, Commander Tung and Chen Honghui.

Even so, some reviewers, like Cynthia Vinney of CBR, called the interactions between Honghui and Mulan "more homoerotic" than Li Shang's in the animated version and "can be read as bisexual" while Lauren Puckett of Harper's Bazaar criticized Reed's reasoning as incorrect. Scholar Jo Johnson described Mulan as having a character, Mulan herself, who could "successfully 'pass' as the opposite sex" and as subverting her traditionally assigned gender signifiers, while having an "unusually masculine body." It was further stated that as a result, Mulan was the "perfect embodiment of a drag king" even though she maintains her heterosexuality as she is attracted to Li Sheng, comparing Mulan's interpretation of her sexuality to that of Bugs Bunny. Furthermore, gay playwright Harvey Fierstein voiced a character in Mulan, and only accepted the part after confirming that the rest of the cast was Asian so he would not take work away from an Asian actor.

=== ParaNorman ===
In August 2012, ParaNorman, a stop-motion animated dark fantasy comedy horror film, would be released in the United States. In the film, Courtney has a crush on Mitch Downe and invites him to watch a horror movie. She, however, discovers that he is gay and already in a relationship when he says, "You know, you're gonna love my boyfriend. He's like a total chick flick nut!" Co-director Chris Butler said that the character's sexual orientation was explicitly connected with the film's message: "If we're saying to anyone that watches this movie don't judge other people, then we've got to have the strength of our convictions." In an interview with the Butler and co-director Sam Fell, they talked about the importance of telling a story about intolerance, bullying, and making family entertainment while "push[ing] the boundaries," with a gay protagonist.

Reviewers positively received the show's LGBTQ representation. Jacob Combs of IndieWire said the series made history in "the quietest way possible" when a supporting character mentioned his boyfriend near the end of the film, becoming "the first openly gay character in an American animated feature." Following the release of The Mitchells vs. the Machines in April 2021, Rueben Baron of CBR would describe Mitch's character in the Paranorman as "the first openly gay character in an all-ages American animated movie" and the most prominent prior to Katie's character in The Mitchells vs. the Machines.

Ten years after the release of Paranorman, Cameron Sheetz of Queerty called said the film had the horror genre's "first gay himbo character": Mitch. The same year, Randy Jones of FOX 10 Phoenix would describe the film as a "trailblazer" and note the film's "groundbreaking LGBTQ representation." One year later, Ray Clough and Callum Jones of MovieWeb argued the film's creators did not want to portray a gay male character stereotypically, and noted that film fans would praise "the team for making Mitch's sexuality...a tiny story beat and not using it as a plot hook."

=== In a Heartbeat ===
In July 2017, In a Heartbeat, an animated short film produced by Ringling College of Art and Design and funded through Kickstarter, was released. The short film concerns a closeted gay boy, Sherwin who has a crush on another boy named Jonathan and his heart desires to be with him. The film went viral, receiving tens of millions of views on YouTube. Since its release, the film received numerous awards and was shown at numerous LGBT events and film festivals. It got shortlisted at the Academy Awards for Best Animated Short Film, but did not get a nomination.

Co-creator Esteban Bravo later told NBC News that with the short film, they wanted "to challenge the preconceived notion that LGBTQ content is not appropriate or suitable for younger audiences" and that LGBTQ themes are "front and center" but that the film is "ultimately...a story about a crush," while co-creator Beth David said they tried to tell the story "from a genuine place and be as emotionally honest" as they could. In an interview with The Guardian, Bravo said he understood why studios are "afraid to portray LGBT characters" due to a part of the population not accepting of LGBTQ people, but said that he, and David believe it is "really important for them to represent these people", because otherwise it leads to a "lot of internalized confusion" for children as they are growing up.

The film was positively received for its LGBTQ themes. Matt Donnelly of The Wrap said the short film had the internet "swooning over its tenderness and timely LGBT inclusion." Brandon Tensley of Pacific Standard argued that the film "installs gay love in the canon of romances that established these clichés in the first place," and called it, in its own way, a "masterful piece of subversive storytelling." Hoai-Tran Bui of Slash Film called the film a "tender lover story" which could rival shorts by Pixar, comparing it Paperman (2012) and Inner Workings (2016), two short films, and hoped it was a matter of time before Disney and Pixar "produce a feature film with a gay lead character." Christina Caron of The Independent said that the charm of the film is that it is "told without words, just music and animation." Jack Shepard of the same publication described the animated short as done in the Pixar style, and received a "hugely positive reaction" including from groups such as the Human Rights Campaign, and from others, who drew fan art of the characters.

=== Rocko's Modern Life: Static Cling ===
In August 2019, Rocko's Modern Life: Static Cling, a television film and sequel to Nickelodeon's 1993 series Rocko's Modern Life, began airing on Netflix. The producers worked with GLAAD to endure that the transgender character, in the form of cartoonist frog Rachel Bighead (known by a different name in the original series) as well as a plotline involving her coming out to her parents, Ed and Bev Bighead, was respectful to the LGBTQ+ community and fit within the show itself. Previously, Rocko's Modern Life was reported to have a "subversive coming out allegory" in an episode of the series which came out in 1996, entitled "Closet Clown." In an interview with SYFY, the creator of Rocko's Modern Life, Joe Murray said that changing Rachel's character in the film was like a "natural progression," a change better for her and "how these communities are represented in modern day" and says something like this would never had happened in the 1990s. In another interview, with Collider, Murray said they thought it would "be a natural thing" for Rachel's character to transition, that he thought it was a "great idea" but that Nickelodeon was a little shocked and hesitant at first, with Nickelodeon president Cyma Zarghami suggesting they get GLAAD involved, and the crew agreed.

The film was praised for centering on LGBTQ life by Devin Randall for Instinct Magazine, calling making Rachel a trans character would be "true LGBTQ representation" while Taylor Hosking of Vice described the film as a "huge step forward," noting that previously cartoons had generally "hinted at LGBTQ characters with coded references only parseable by adults," noting examples such as Betty DeVille as a butch character in Rugrats, and queer-coded villains in The Lion King (Scar) and Aladdin (Jafar). Jacob Oller of Paste said that the LGBTQ themes become "a major plot point" and changes the story from a "self-referential one-note one-liner." Polly Conway of Common Sense Media said the film has positive message about unconditional love and accepting change, saying this is mainly explored "through a transgender main character's transition from male to female." Joe Matar of Den of Geek said that LGBTQ issues are the main theme of the film and handled "in a smart, graceful, and surprisingly poignant way."

=== Wendell & Wild ===
On October 28, 2022, Wendell & Wild was released on Netflix. The film features Raúl Cocolotl, a transgender boy in an all-girls Catholic school. He is the first transgender male character in a major animated film. Raúl is voiced by transgender actor Sam Zelaya. In an interview with Them, Zelaya said there was pressure in representing something beyond himself, said he hoped that people liked what he had done, describing his voice work as "for the community as much as it is for me." He also said it was "really cool" to voice Raúl, noted that that character partially resembles him in real life, and hoped that LGBTQ children "feel seen in a way that they might not have before." He also said that he was glad the film "doesn't talk down to kids" and handles many issues, including those related to trans people, well. The film's director, Henry Selick, told The Hollywood Reporter said that the decision to make Raúl a trans character was decided when he was conceiving the film with Jordan Peele, in 2016, with the character inspired by Peele's life experience. He also said he cared "deeply about representation" and described it as "fact of life of people I respect and care a lot about."

Reviewers praised the film. Laura Zornosa of Time said the film quickly and seamlessly reveals that Raúl is a trans character, noted that the film's assistant editor, Sarah Ligatich, is a trans woman, and gave notes to Selick directly, and stated that his character, along with Barney in Dead End: Paranormal Park, are primary examples of creators using animation to "reclaim horror for queer and trans people." Charles Pulliam-Moore of Collider noted that mention of Raul sort of gender transitioning is presented as "part of the broader story and the multifaceted character in a manner that rings true."

=== Strange World ===
Strange World which was released on November 23, 2022, features Ethan Clade, who is the first gay lead character in a Disney animated film. Ethan Clade is voiced by gay comedian Jaboukie Young-White. Prior to the film's release, cast and crew, such as the film's director (Don Hall) and co-writer (Qui Nguyen), spoke about Ethan's character to Variety, describing his relationship with Diazo, his crush, as organic, relatable, understandable, and noting that the character is well-rounded. Gabrielle Union, who voices Meridian Clade in the film, told The Hollywood Reporter, was "absolutely honored" to be part of telling a story of a loving and affectionate family, that the Ethan's gay identity is only one aspect of his character and not "a big deal" in the film, and commented that it would "be sad" if the film was banned in certain countries, adding it only denies people "information that we exist." Jake Gyllenhaal who voices Searcher Clade in the film, said that the film helps to "normalize the normal" and said that is "exactly how every movie should be."

Reviewers praised the film for featuring a gay couple as protagonists. Javier Ocaña of El País, while criticizing the film in some ways, still noted that although the characters do not kiss onscreen, their relationship is shown naturally, and is a "historic gesture" from Disney, creating a world that is "LGBT+ friendly and villain-less." Kristy Puchko of Mashable said that the film feels like "worthwhile representation" and acknowledges that gay kids can "just exist in media and not have their identity treated like grounds for a teachable moment." Renaldo Metadeen of CBR lauded the film for making "huge leaps in terms of queer inclusivity," despite Disney minimally promoting the film, and argued that film is filled with "messages of acceptance in a very authentic, welcoming manner." Allegra Frank of The Daily Beast described the film as starring a "queer teen lead", with the link between his interracial family and queerness at the film's center, and is "shockingly progressive" for Hollywood family films. Jade King of TheGamer argued that the film is undermined by Disney's previous failures with representation of LGBTQ people, while the film shows Ethan's identity and acceptance as "unexpectedly normal."

=== Nimona ===
In February 2021, Deadline reported that the film adaptation of Nimona was cancelled due to the shutdown of Blue Sky Studios. Sources told CBR that the film was "75% complete". Anonymous staffers at Blue Sky interviewed by Business Insider bemoaned the cancellation of the film, calling it "heartbreaking," arguing that the film "didn't look like anything else in the animated world," and saying that they believe it will never "be completed and released." A few staffers confirmed to BuzzFeed News that the film had an "I love you" scene between Blackheart and Goldenloin. In June 2021, Mey Rude, a writer for Out, said she still held out "hope that this film...will find its way back to life somehow." In July 2021, Meggie Gates in Bitch, said the film would have been Disney's first "legitimately queer film" and could have been a turning point "for how the corporation handles queerness" but that the Disney chose to "bury its gays" by cancelling the film, a blow to queer Disney fans. In April 2022, it was announced Netflix revived the film and will be releasing it in 2023.

Following the film's release, it received critical acclaim. Peter Debrudge of Variety called the film "such subversive fun", "outside-the-box" animation, LGBTQ+ themes and vocal performances. Lindsey Bahr of the Associated Press called it a "fantasy adventure with riot grrrl energy" and praised the animation, soundtrack and lead performances. Ben Travis of Empire noted that the film's LGBTQ+ themes are "undiluted, present in the very bones of the story" and the characters, Frank Scheck of The Hollywood Reporter noted that one of the film's notable aspects is its "handling of the tender romantic relationship between Ballister and Ambrosius."

== See also ==
- Cartoon Network and LGBT representation
- Disney and LGBT representation in animation
- Netflix and LGBT representation in animation
- List of cross-dressing characters in animated series
- List of animated series with LGBT characters
- Sexuality in Star Trek
- Media portrayal of asexuality
- Media portrayal of pansexuality
- History of homosexuality in American film
- Intersex characters in fiction
- Gay characters in fiction
- Non-binary characters in fiction
