= Mystery Science Theater 3000 (web series) =

- Created by: Jim Mallon
- Written by: Paul Chaplin
- Voices of: Paul Chaplin; James Moore; Jim Mallon

Production
- Animators: "Puny"; Maxeem Konrardy; Victor Courtright; Mike Owens; Amanda Peters; Julia Vickerman; Shadi Petosky

Original release
- Release: November 5, 2007

Mystery Science Theater 3000, also referred to as "The 'Bots Are Back!" is an Internet cartoon created by Best Brains, Inc. It was inspired by BBI's original Mystery Science Theater 3000 TV series, and was directed by former Executive Producer Jim Mallon. The series featured the robot characters from the original series in a variety of brief sketches taking place at an undetermined point during the original show's fictional timeline. However, no human character (Joel or Mike) is present.

== Cast ==
- Paul Chaplin as Crow T. Robot
- James Moore as Tom Servo
- Jim Mallon as Gypsy

== History ==
The animated version of MST3K was first announced on the Satellite News website (formerly BBI's official website and was to be the home website for the new installment) on October 29, 2007. The new cartoon was described as a "weekly series of animated adventures," and would debut as part of an all-new MST3K website. This new site would also feature content from the original series as well as a new online store. The website went live on November 5, 2007, along with the first installment of the animated series.

New episodes were scheduled to be posted every Monday. However, despite regular updates to other parts of the site, no new episodes of the cartoon have been posted since November 26, 2007. In June 2008, the website was redesigned and the cartoons removed for unspecified reasons; however the Flash likenesses of the characters were still present on some pages. On July 18, MST3K fansite Satellite News posted an interview with Jim Mallon, who explained that the cartoons cost more to produce than was initially estimated. He also stated that the existing cartoons will return to the site, and expressed hope that the series may continue at some point in the future. Animation producer Shadi Petosky responded that the costs were low and flat rates that never changed from the original estimates, she suspects that the revenue was the problem and the mouse pads, post-it notes, and T-shirts being sold to pay for the show did not sell as fans did not like the poorly designed and written animated characters.

== Reactions ==
Initially, response to the new website on both of the major fan discussion boards was largely negative. Michael J. Nelson, star and head writer of the original series, called the animated series "cute" but felt it was an "after-the-fact" idea. Viewers of the flash series had said that the animation was poor and the voice actors did not fit with the characters.

== Episodes ==
1. "Reel Livin'": Crow goes fishing and discusses the benefits of his "incredibly stable" kayak before being capsized by Servo on a jet ski.
2. "Feels Like": Gypsy and Servo discuss actual temperature versus the wind chill factor. Servo then begins translating everything Gypsy says into "feels like..." statements, much to her annoyance.
3. "Thanksgiving Clown": Servo dresses up as a clown, thinking it to be a Thanksgiving tradition. Crow consults an old World Book encyclopedia to verify.
4. "Solitaire": Crow plays solitaire while Servo advises. Eventually Crow becomes fed up with Servo's pestering and leaves. Servo sees a fantastic move, but can't play as his arms don't work. Desperate, he unsuccessfully tries to move the cards using telekinesis, but in the process breaks himself.
