= Twelve Forever =

American animated television series

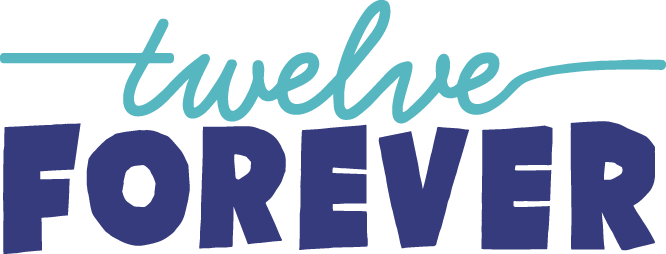
- Genre: Action; Adventure; Comedy; Fantasy; Coming-of-age; Surreal humour
- Created by: Julia Vickerman
- Story by: Julia Vickerman; Spencer Rothbell
- Directed by: Annisa Adjani; Nick Sumida; John Mathot
- Voices of: Kelsy Abbott; Antony Del Rio; Jaylen Barron; Matt Berry; Steve Agee; Wade Randolph
- Theme music composer: Adam Deibert; Jarond Gibbs
- Opening theme: "Twelve Forever"
- Composers: Adam Deibert; Jarond Gibbs; Kevin Sukho Lee (additional music, pilot only)
- Country of origin: United States
- Original language: English
- No. of seasons: 1
- No. of episodes: 25

Production
- Executive producers: Julia Vickerman; Bradford Bricken; Jeff Holland; Stan Spry; Shadi Petosky; Chris Hardwick
- Producer: Julia Vickerman
- Animator: Saerom Animation
- Editors: Rob Getzschman (pilot); Tony Christopherson (series)
- Running time: 12–13 minutes; 23 minutes (episode 1)
- Production companies: Puny Entertainment; The Cartel; Netflix Studios

Original release
- Network: Netflix
- Release: July 29, 2019

Twelve Forever is an American animated television series created by Julia Vickerman for Netflix. Vickerman had previously worked on Clarence and The Powerpuff Girls. Twelve Forever premiered on Netflix in the United States on July 29, 2019.

== Premise ==
The series is set in the early 2000s and centers on Regina "Reggie" Abbott, an imaginative 12-year-old whose desire to remain a child is so powerful she can enter another world in which she never has to grow up: an island called Endless where her childhood toys and drawings are real.

Regina is joined by her friends Todd and Esther Hopkins, who visit this amazing world to live out their superhero fantasies and escape the responsibilities of impending adulthood. Life and reality often catch up with them in Endless as the preteens start dealing with growing pains and conflicts develop between them. The negativity the friends experience while dealing with their new complicated problems feed their enemy, the nefarious Butt Witch, who seeks to destroy Endless.

== Characters ==
=== Main characters ===
- Regina "Reggie" Abbott (voiced by Kelsy Abbott) - the 12-year-old protagonist who leads her friends Todd and Esther to Endless Island, where their imaginations come alive, where she takes on the identity of "Twelve." One of the executive producers of the series, Shadi Petosky, described Reggie as a queer character "coming to terms with her sexuality".
- Todd (voiced by Antony Del Rio) - friend of Reggie and Esther who travels to Endless Island.

=== Recurring characters ===
- Esther Hopkins (voiced by Jaylen Barron) - African-American girl and friend of Reggie who travels to Endless Island and friend of Reggie and Todd.
- Conelly (voiced by Stephanie Beatriz)- Fourteen-year-old girl and aspiring filmmaker who is inspired by the talents of Reggie, who has a crush on her, as shown in the two-part episode "Locked Out Forever". Due to the show's abrupt ending, Petosky stated they won't be able to further explore that aspect of the character/relationship.
- Judy (voiced by Bridget Everett) - Reggie's mother
- Dustin (voiced by Brandon Wardell) - Reggie's older brother.
- Kathy (voiced by Abott)- Judy's best friend. Her nephew is Odgen and sister is Terry.
- Ogden (voiced by Maximus Riegel) - Four-year-old nephew of Kathy and friend of Reggie.
- Mrs. Krandle (voiced by Laura Zak) - Literature teacher at the school Esther attends.
- Aaron (voiced by Daniel Amerman) - Older brother of Todd.
- Manny (voiced by Sam Brown) - Father of Aaron.
- Gwen (voiced by Ashley Boettcher)- Todd's girlfriend.
- Leslie (voiced by Brittany Ashley) - Judy's boss.
- Kendra (voiced by Brittany Ashley) - Daughter of Leslie.
- Dennis (voiced by Rothbell) - Judy's boyfriend.

=== Residents of Endless Island ===
- The Butt Witch (voiced by Matt Berry) - The adversary of Todd, Esther, and Reggie in Endless Island, who is given this name by Reggie.
- Big Deal (voiced by Steve Agee) - Assistant of the Butt Witch and secondary antagonist.
- Beefhouse (voiced by Agee) - Boyfriend of Mack and friend of Reggie.
- Mack (voiced by Agee) - Boyfriend of Beefhouse, both of whom are a gay couple in this fantasy world.
- Galaxander (voiced by Agee) - Friends with Todd and Reggie, and has an ex-boyfriend named Red Constellation, as noted on the show's official social media.
- Flaps (voiced by Abott)- Octopus and friend of Reggie, who helps her in Endless Island
- Captain Elmer (voiced by Paul Williams)- Former human and antagonist.
- Manguin (voiced by Ron Funches) - Penguin and friend of Esther and Reggie, and secondary antagonist.
- Borbo (voiced by Wade Randolph) - Short and mischievous creature, disliked by Reggie and her friends.
- Colin (voiced by Spencer Rothbell) - Friend of Todd and Reggie, who is nervous and neurotic.
- Queen Limerick (voiced by Laura Zak) - Somewhat humanoid and rides Omelet, her steed, and is from the Erdu region.
- Sadmantha (voiced by Amy Sedaris) - A compilation of everything Reggie feels about her father, Daryl.

== Production, release, and future ==
The original pilot was produced for Cartoon Network, by Cartoon Network Studios, and was originally released on their website on May 18, 2015, as part of Cartoon Network Shorts Department, and was said to be inspired by Vickerman's feelings as "a burgeoning adolescent."

In December 2017, it was announced that Netflix had acquired the rights to Twelve Forever for a full series, with production duties being handled by The Cartel and Puny Entertainment. Netflix picked up the rides to the series after Cartoon Network passed on it, with "promises of queer-inclusive content." Shadi Petosky began working on the show sometime before July 2017, when she hoped for more episodes of Danger & Eggs, as a non-creative/non-writing executive producer. Paul Hornschemeier later described himself as the series art director.

On July 29, 2019, the series debuted on Netflix. Kelsy Abott, Steve Agee, and Matt Barry reprised the characters they voiced in the pilot, specifically Reggie, Flaps, Beefhouse, Big Deal, Mack, and the Butt Witch. It was later stated that the series was created by a "design crew of all local artists" based in Minnesota. Following the series release, the series had an official gift shop, selling t-shirts, mugs, stickers, plush toys, hats, and other merchandise.

In September 2019, Shadi Petosky announced on social media that the show had been canceled. While Petosky was described as the executive producer on the show in a July 2019 AP article on LGBTQ representation in animation, she stated in September 2019 that she had no connection with the show since the show's first season had premiered on Netflix earlier that year. It was also stated by EW, in September 2019, that the show's producers had parted ways with series creator Julia Vickerman, without a specific reason stated. EW noted speculation on Twitter about a "hostile work environment" for those working on the series. In October 2019, at the Catalyst Content Festival, Vickerman was on an animation panel with Eric Knobel moderated by Mike Owens, while Petosky spoke on a panel about "creating a narrative series."

In 2020, Lacey Womack of Screen Rant stated that the series was on "indefinite hiatus," and stated that there were unclear plans for the series future.

== Episodes ==
=== Cartoon Network pilot (2015) ===
Title	Directed by	Written by	Storyboarded by	Original release date
"Twelve Forever"	Nick Cross (art) & Robert Alvarez (timing)	Julia Vickerman	Julia Vickerman & Victor Courtright (additional)	May 18, 2015
At school, Reggie plays with her action figure, Captain Malibu, while sitting with her friend, Shane (Resse Hartwig), at lunch. After accidentally picking a fight with Tristan (Jorge Diaz), Reggie and Shane go to Party Island. She shows Shane around the island. Later, Reggie uses a magic water solution, that the Butt Witch conjured, on Tristan, turning him into a baby. After her failed attempts to fight him, Shane transforms into a mom to calm down Tristan. Reggie later uses the same solution on the Butt Witch, transforming her into a baby. They all return to school, with Shane claiming they all slept in the locker together, with Tristan calling them "freaks," while Shane and Reggie strengthen their friendship.

=== Netflix series (2019) ===
No.	Title	Directed by	Written by	Storyboarded by	Original release date
1	"Birthday Forever"	John Mathot	Story by : Julia Vickerman; Teleplay by : Kelsy Abbott	Phylicia Fuentes & Nick Sumida	July 29, 2019
Reggie's imagination unlocks a wild and wonderful world where she can be herself – and escape the pressures of growing up.
2	"The Butt Witch Forever"	Annisa Adjani	Story by : Julia Vickerman; Teleplay by : Spencer Rothbell	Erica Jones & Meghan Tryon	July 29, 2019
Trying to avoid learning about puberty, Reggie accidentally unleashes the Butt Witch on their world.
3	"Esther Forever"	John Mathot	Story by : Julia Vickerman; Teleplay by : Laura Zak	Mike Bertino & Ron Stanage	July 29, 2019
Esther, the new girl at school, tries to join Reggie and Todd's crew.
4	"Guy Pleasant Forever"	Annisa Adjani	Story by : Julia Vickerman; Teleplay by : Tony Infante & Richard Lee	Ashlyn Anstee & Nicolette Wood	July 29, 2019
When his big brother moves away for college, Todd tries to create a new brother.
5	"Endless Forever"	John Mathot	Story by : Julia Vickerman; Teleplay by : Kelsy Abbott	Phylicia Fuentes & Nick Sumida	July 29, 2019
Todd and Esther try to investigate Endless' mysteries.
6	"Dustin Forever"	Annisa Adjani	Story by : Julia Vickerman; Teleplay by : Spencer Rothbell	Erica Jones & Meghan Tryon	July 29, 2019
Reggie tries to reconnect with her brother in filming their series "Space Draculas."
7	"Mack and Beefhouse Forever"	John Mathot & Nick Sumida	Story by : Julia Vickerman; Teleplay by : Kelsy Abbott	Mike Bertino & Ron Stanage	July 29, 2019
The Butt Witch tries to create friction between Mack and Beefhouse.
8	"The Mall Forever"	Annisa Adjani	Story by : Julia Vickerman; Teleplay by : Laura Zak	Ashlyn Anstee & Nicolette Wood	July 29, 2019
Reggie's mom takes her and Esther to the mall to buy something nice.
9	"School Forever"	John Mathot & Nick Sumida	Story by : Spencer Rothbell; Teleplay by : Tony Infante	Phylicia Fuentes & Nick Sumida	July 29, 2019
After an annoying day at school, the kids try teaching lessons in Endless.
10	"Secrets Forever"	Annisa Adjani	Story by : Julia Vickerman; Teleplay by : Laura Zak	Erica Jones & Meghan Tryon	July 29, 2019
The gang discovers a grocery store on Endless.
11	"Manguin Forever"	Nick Sumida	Story by : Julia Vickerman; Teleplay by : Spencer Rothbell	Mike Bertino & Ron Stanage	July 29, 2019
Esther hires a penguin assistant to help Reggie with her garden.
12	"Fancy Forever"	Annisa Adjani	Story by : Julia Vickerman; Teleplay by : Kelsy Abbott	Ashlyn Anstee & Nicolette Wood	July 29, 2019
Reggie attempts to become the best-dressed person on Endless.
13	"The Locals Forever"	John Mathot & Nick Sumida	Kelsy Abbott	Phylicia Fuentes & Nick Sumida	July 29, 2019
The gang spies on the residents of Endless.
14	"Reggie's Dad Forever"	Annisa Adjani	Story by : Julia Vickerman; Teleplay by : Laura Zak	Erica Jones & Meghan Tryon	July 29, 2019
Reggie finds a box of her dad's stuff and releases a sad spirit in Endless.
15	"Babysitting Forever"	Nick Sumida	Story by : Julia Vickerman; Teleplay by : Spencer Rothbell	Diana Lafyatis & Ron Stanage	July 29, 2019
Reggie tries babysitting and ends up taking the kid to Endless with her.
16	"Not Twelve Forever"	Annisa Adjani	Kelsy Abbott	Ashlyn Anstee & Nicolette Wood	July 29, 2019
Big Deal tries to impress the Butt Witch.
17	"Locked Out Forever"(Part 1–2)	Nick Sumida	Story by : Julia Vickerman; Teleplay by : Laura Zak	Phylicia Fuentes & Sydney Sharp	July 29, 2019
18	"Locked Out Forever"(Part 1–2)	Annisa Adjani	Story by : Julia Vickerman; Teleplay by : Laura Zak	Erica Jones & Meghan Tryon	July 29, 2019
Part 1: Reggie develops a crush on Conelly, an eighth grade girl. Part 2: Reggie tries to figure out how to get back into Endless.
19	"Brown Roger Forever"	Nick Sumida	Story by : Julia Vickerman; Teleplay by : Spencer Rothbell	Katie Mitroff & Ron Stanage	July 29, 2019
The Butt Witch starts to influence Brown Roger.
20	"Spring Break Forever"	Annisa Adjani	Story by : Julia Vickerman; Teleplay by : Kelsy Abbott	Raj Brueggemann & Nicolette Wood	July 29, 2019
Reggie's stuck in the hospital during Spring Break.
21	"Dance Forever"	Nick Sumida	Spencer Rothbell	Phylicia Fuentes & Sydney Sharp	July 29, 2019
Todd meets a new girl named Gwen and the gang goes to a school dance.
22	"Audition Forever"	Annisa Adjani	Story by : Julia Vickerman; Teleplay by : Laura Zak	Erica Jones & Meghan Tryon	July 29, 2019
Todd tries out for a band, but they choose Esther instead.
23	"A Stranger Forever"	Nick Sumida	Story by : Julia Vickerman; Teleplay by : Kelsy Abbott	Katie Mitroff & Kyle Neswald	July 29, 2019
Captain Elmer arrives on Endless, but Todd and Esther are suspicious of him.
24	"Todd Forever"	Annisa Adjani	Story by : Julia Vickerman; Teleplay by : Spencer Rothbell	Raj Brueggemann & Jay Hasrajani	July 29, 2019
Reggie plans a huge 13th birthday surprise for Todd.
25	"Together Forever"	Nick Sumida & Ed Tadem	Story by : Julia Vickerman; Teleplay by : Laura Zak	Grace Liu, Dan Stone & Sydney Sharp	July 29, 2019
The Butt Witch tries to manipulate the gang while they're fighting.

== Reception ==
Reviews were mostly positive. Lacey Womack of Screen Rant said the series was something those of all ages could enjoy. Rodney Ho of The Atlanta Journal-Constitution said that there was a "great pedigree" of those working on the show. Kevin Johnson of The A.V. Club said the show had a "sense of its Midwest, small town setting as the backdrop of conformist pressure" and compared it to Gravity Falls. Dina Rudolph of the Windy City Times praised its LGBTQ representation, putting it alongside shows such as Steven Universe, She-Ra and the Princesses of Power, Kipo and the Age of Wonderbeasts, The Dragon Prince, and OK K.O.! Let's Be Heroes. The Encyclopedia of Science Fiction contributor Steven Pearce argued that the show juggles dark and light, the real world and the imagined world, with Endless acting out "metaphorical versions of Reggie's real-world problems." Pearce also said that the series is good and inventive, bringing in surrealism, "pre-teen angst, humour and twelve-year-olds using flame-throwers."

Mandie Caroll of Common Sense Media described the series as a "wonderfully weird show" with heart and to expect cartoon violence. She also said that young teenagers and tweens would enjoy the show's "imaginative world, relatable yet quirky characters, and the raw emotionality of this colorful cartoon."

In January 2020, GLAAD nominated the show for its Outstanding Kids & Family Programming award, along with a host of other shows. Previously, in 2019, the organization recognized the series as one of a number of shows released that year with LGBTQ representation. The series was later described, by Nathan Maizels of Collider, as among the best series with LGBTQ characters and themes, noting Reggie's crush on Connelly, noting other LGBTQ+ characters, and calling the series a "coming-of-age story about a young queer girl learning about her identity."
