= Tyler Ford =

Writer and public speaker

- Born: 1990 or 1991 (age 35–36); Boca Raton, Florida
- Education: Vanderbilt University
- Occupations: Writer, activist, actor, public speaker
- Known for: Transgender advocacy
- Website: myfriendtyler.com

Tyler Ford is a writer, activist, actor, and public speaker who advocates for transgender and non-binary people. Ford appeared as the first transgender contestant on The Glee Project in 2012. Ford lives and works in New York City.

== Life ==
Designated female at birth and raised by a single mother in Boca Raton, Florida, Ford transitioned to male in college, but later came to identify as agender. Ford is of mixed black and white Jewish ethnicity. Their writing and speaking frequently addresses their challenges living as a transgender person of color.

Ford gained national attention when Miley Cyrus brought them as her date to The Foundation for AIDS Research (AMFAR) gala in 2015. Cyrus sought to raise awareness of people with non-binary gender identities as part of her LGBTQ advocacy work with the Happy Hippie Foundation; Ford and their friend Ariana Grande joined Cyrus in that effort.

== Work and activism ==
=== Writing ===
Ford wrote an article for The Guardian in 2015 and has written multiple articles for them. in 2017 and again in 2018. They have written for MTV, Rookie, and other web sites.

=== Public speaking ===
Ford has presented at South by Southwest (SXSW). They gave the opening remarks for New York Youth Pride parade in 2018, in which they talked about their coming out and transition.

=== Television ===
In June 2017, Ford began voicing a non-binary character Milo on the Amazon Video animated series Danger & Eggs.

== Awards and recognition ==
Ford was named as one of MTV's best social media stars in 2015, and as one of the Dazed 100 visionary talents in 2016.
