= Shadi Petosky =

American animator

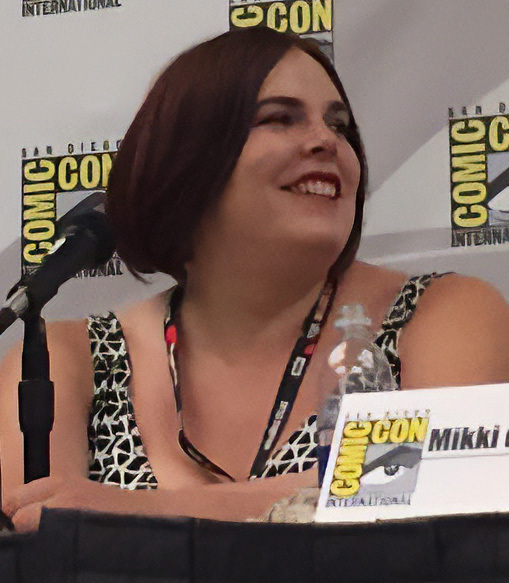
- Petosky in 2016
- Born: Kalispell, Montana, U.S.
- Occupations: Cartoonist; television producer
- Years active: 2007–present
- Notable work: Danger & Eggs, Twelve Forever

Shadi Petosky is an American television producer and writer. She co-created the animated series Danger & Eggs, was executive producer for Twelve Forever, and has worked on television series including The Sandman.

== Early life ==
Petosky was born in Kalispell, Montana, growing up in a rural area. (Note: See 35:18 in the Queery podcast, which can be listened to here. All further references about the Queery podcast refer to the one linked in this reference.) Petosky cites Ani DiFranco and folk music in general as early positive influences in her life. (Note: See 43:40 in the Queery podcast.) She stated that she spent part of her childhood in Gwinn, Michigan, with her family living on U.S. Air Force bases. Later describing herself as "total AV club / film / theater kid," who read independent comic books in high school, and "devouring" many videos at the video store, she noted that she has been a "victim of violence" in that early part of her life, and onward because she was "a loud, queer kid in a rural area." At the same time, Petosky said she loved comic books, was an "aspiring artist." Petosky was diagnosed with ADHD and says that many people in her family are neurodivergent. (Note: According to the List of United States Air Force installations page, there are currently three military installations in Wisconsin, but none are close to Mason. Other bases, like Fort McCoy and Volk Field Air National Guard Base are also a far distance away. However, it is 214 miles from Gwinn, Michigan.)

== Career ==
=== 2004–2009: Career beginnings ===
Petosky was a computer programmer before meeting Zander Cannon and helping Cannon to co-publish The Replacement God. With Cannon and Kevin Cannon, Petosky formed the comic art studio Big Time Attic in late 2004. The three illustrated the graphic novel Bone Sharps, Cowboys, and Thunder Lizards for science writer Jim Ottaviani.

In January 2007, Petosky and Vincent "King Mini" Stall, along with the employees of Big Time Attic, formed a "convergence media" studio called Puny Entertainment, half of which was bought by Chris Hardwick in 2015. The studio went defunct around a decade later. In 2016, Petosky stated that creating Puny Entertainment was her only option if she wanted to do "creative work." Shadi was later described as the "cofounder and creative director" of PUNY.

=== 2007–2010: Yo Gabba Gabba and Mystery Science Theater 3000 ===
Petosky and Stall created video games and animation for Cartoon Network and created animation for the Nickelodeon/Nick Jr. Channel television show Yo Gabba Gabba!, which ran from 2007 to 2019. While acting as an animation supervisor on the show, she was "introduced to opportunities in kids’ animation." She later described how animation came as a surprise after doing it on Yo Gabba Gabba! She would serve as animation supervisor on all 72 episodes of the series and won a related a Webby Award. When she worked on Mystery Science Theater 3000 in 2007, Petosky talked about the financial cost of the show. She stated that she suspected that the show had problem generating revenue, selling t-shirts, post-it notes, and mouse pads to pay for the show's production because fans did not like the poorly designed and written animated characters.

Then, in 2009, Petosky and Stall opened the Pink Hobo - Geek Art Gallery in 2009 to showcase art work inspired by pop culture, digital media, and lowbrow art. In its first year, the art gallery, in northeast Minneapolis, had exhibitions on Barack Obama and the art of Yo Gabba Gabba. Later, Feral Audio was launched from her apartment in Franklin Village, near the Upright Citizens Brigade Theater, with her, and other artists at PUNY, creating the brand identity, website, and cover art for Feral's first slate of podcasts. In 2010, Petosky developed the pilot for Danger & Eggs titled "Philip, the Safety Egg." Petosky was interviewed at Amazon's request as a writer for Transparent but was rejected because she came from another part of the entertainment industry though she consulted on the show. After public outcry that the show had no transgender writers, Shadi was part of a second season training program and competition to find a trans writer from six possible candidates.

In 2010, she served as animation supervisor on the film, Super.

=== 2011–2020: Danger & Eggs and Twelve Forever ===
In 2011, Petosky began working on Danger & Eggs even more, pitching the show, and later becoming the executive producer who was "responsible for everything." The show would be traditionally animated, which she called "super labor intensive."

From 2012 to 2013 she was an animation supervisor for multiple episodes of Mad. She would also be an animation supervisor for Dreamworld and Big Miracle in 2012. In 2013 and 2014 she would serve as an animation supervisor for segments of The Aquabats! Super Show! and animation supervisor for an episode of Parks and Recreation, "New Slogan",

A few years later, in June 2017, Petosky's Danger & Eggs, launched on Amazon Video. She had co-created and provided voice work for it, and it was the first series she collaborated with Chris Hardwick on. She described the series as important for her as a trans person, noted that a lot of the show is LGBTQ and that it deals with LGBTQ issues "in a really platonic way and at their core," avoiding any stereotypes. She also stated that the show never touches on romantic relationships or crushes, saying there are pride signs in the show's final episode, saying this is different than calling it "Rainbow Day" like other shows. She further stated that she wanted to "show innocent LGBTQ friendships, before the age of romantic connections," and added that there were "queer people in every aspect of production." In another interview, she stated that the crew had been working on the series for six years and asked people to support the show.

In October 2017, she wrote that she told the show's writers to treat it like "speculative social fiction" and noted that "writing LGBTQ+ kids...and their freedoms of tomorrow" would heal her own "traumatic childhood" and was proud of the show's episode on pride, while thanking Amazon she was able to do what she could on the show. Overall, the show was praised for its "colorful, quirky animation style," "quietly groundbreaking" for its number of LGBTQ characters, and praised for its "cast and creative team of LGBTQ people." Other reviews called it "something special that kids will love," will be cherished by adults, and young queer people. The same year, Petosky joined Rebecca Sugar, Lauren Faust, and hundreds of others to animation studios demanding "an end to sexism and sexual harassment in the animation industry." By February 2018, the future of Danger & Eggs was uncertain. As Petosky put it at the time, she felt that the show was in limbo, with the loss of the crew, without "much concern or enthusiasm" about the show, saying it "just slipped through the cracks." She lamented that the show's fate is up to the new executive team on the show and predicted the show would probably be cancelled as a result. This assessment aligned with what she had said in an interview in July of the previous year: that there would be no second season that she knew of at the time.

Petosky co-created a Nickelodeon pilot called Ugly Mutt with Dan Hagen, and was the executive producer on the Netflix series Twelve Forever, sometime before July 2019. However, in August 2019, she stated that she had no connection with the show since the spring of 2019. In August 2018, she appeared at Flame Con, as did K Alexander, Julia Kaye, Irene Koh, MariNaomi, Lee Knox Ostertag, ND Stevenson, Lilah Sturges, Mariko Tamaki and Brittney Williams. She was executive producer for the sci-fi show, Forever Alone, which was scheduled to premiere in 2020, but remained unreleased.

=== 2021–present: Live-action series, writing, and other work ===
In 2021, she appeared at a virtual USC event with other LGBTQ+ writers, Patricia Resnick, Steven J. Kung, Hillard Guess, and Moisés Zamora to discuss the "current media landscape through the lens of LGBTQ+ representations."

In June 2022, Petosky discussed, in an online webinar, her career as a producer and writer, including creation of Danger & Eggs and her push for "positive LGBTQ+ representation in children’s media", along with a Q&A at Walt Disney Family Museum. A biography for her presentation described her as directing, for Quibi, a pilot for a live-action comedy show named Let's Go Atsuko!, stated that she was developing, with Lilly Wachowski, a live-action series named "Pretty Cursed" for Showtime, and noted that she was developing, with Tom Lynch, a series entitled "Somewhere I Am" for HBO Max, leading an adaption of a young adult sci-fi novel entitled "Its the End of the World as We Know It" for Spotify, Warner, and Alloy. It was also stated that she was a writer for The Sandman. She would write for the series second season, which released in 2025.

In 2025, she would be a writer and animator for the series Clean Slate, which was co-created by George Wallace, Dan Ewen, and Laverne Cox. The series was premiered on Prime Video on February 6, 2025, and received positive reception, but was cancelled after one season in April 2025 by Amazon.

== Personal life ==
=== Gender and sexuality ===
Petosky came out as queer prior to coming out as trans. (Note: See 36:30 in the Queery podcast.) When she did start to identify as trans, gay men she was romantically involved with would ridicule her for it. (Note: See 36:41 in the Queery podcast.) She started seeking therapy around age 24, primarily surrounding her transness. (Note: See 34:37 in the Queery podcast.) She describes it as taking place at a time in the world when "it was a really popular....it was popular to think that if you were [a male to female] trans [person] and you liked men, you were just a self-loathing homosexual, so I believed that hard-core, that, like, I was just...I...I liked boys, I knew I liked boys but I couldn't imagine myself...I had to picture myself as a woman [...] to be able to have an intimate relationship with a boy." (Note: See 34:37 in the Queery podcast.) Eventually, Petosky began subscribing to radical feminist ideology and "got really into trying to, like, break down gender and completely eradicate it from my mind." (Note: See 38:10 in the Queery podcast.)

In September 2015, Petosky was detained at the Orlando International Airport when a full-body scanner scanned her penis, which a Transportation Security Administration agent marked as an anomaly. When Petosky explained to the agent that she is transgender, the TSA agents, including explosives specialists, detained and questioned her for 40 minutes. They also gave her two full body pat-downs and searched her luggage. Petosky asked if they had a protocol for dealing with transgender people, and the agents replied that they knew what they were doing. She was released after the TSA established that she did not present a danger, though she missed her flight, and spent an extra day in Miami. As a result, congressmembers Adam Schiff, Mark Pocan, Brian Higgins, and 29 others sent a letter to Peter Neffenger, administrator of the TSA, urging changes "in the way that the agency screens transgender passengers." Additionally, the Human Rights Campaign called for a "swift and thorough investigation" of the incident. The TSA defended their treatment of Petosky and later stated that agents would stop using the term “anomaly” when describing trans passengers. The same year Petosky was "denied a room on Airbnb" after she told the host she was trans, with the host claiming she did so out of the concern "for the discomfort of her teenaged son." It would not be until the following year that the host would be "removed from the Airbnb platform." Petosky called for the company to have a "specific policy that protects LGBT guests from discrimination," although she eschewed a possible lawsuit, saying it would be "emotionally draining." Years later, Petosky called the congressional letter about the TSA incident a sign that the Democratic Party had the "language and understanding about trans lives and experiences" and said that the prospect of change of the TSA is remote.

In 2017, Petosky stated that she is still learning and questioning everything about her gender, even divorcing herself from labeling herself as a woman: "In allowing flexibility and not having rigid thought is, like, a new concept that I'm working so hard on...to just let myself be flexible. But the world's not that flexible. Like, you know, every article is like, 'This is a show created by a transgender woman,' or, like...I don't call myself a woman. It's just assumed. I don't, but I also don't, like, call myself agender or non-binary or anything like that, because I am pretty binary in a lot of ways. I just say 'trans.' I just like 'trans.' It's just, like, a wide enough [label]." (Note: See 42:33 in the Queery podcast.)

In June 2022, Petosky was describe as living in Los Angeles and obsessed with "mental health, queer history, spaceships, and sea witches."

=== Social and political views ===
Petosky is politically active. In 2002, she edited and animated the political videos for Bushboy.com, cited as pioneering Internet political parody videos pre-YouTube. The popularity of these video led to Petosky doing paid work for Arianna Huffington, Al Franken, and working with Eric Utne to create videos promoting instant-runoff voting. In 2016, in response to "statements of love and images" of men kissing, and in defiance of the homophobic feelings of the gunman Omar Mateen, who perpetrated the Orlando shooting, she posted "a collage of male couples kissing", which she says caused her to immediately lose "200 followers on Twitter," although the post was "liked more than a thousand times." One year later, when interviewed by GLAAD, she stated that she has seen "negative consequences" for simultaneously working in the entertainment industry and being an early "vocal advocate for more fair and accurate representations of transgender people in the media," noting that some people have been scared to meet with her, with some telling her to tone down her posts, although others supported her. As such, she called for trans people to do work that is visible, and said it is weird that LGBT people are "underrepresented in the telling of their own cultural stories." She said something similar in a 2015 interview. Petosky also stated, in 2018, that Amazon told her to "tone down" her political messages, claiming it's unwelcome coming from someone working for them, and saying she should stop being as critical of the TSA.

== Podcast appearances ==
Name of Podcast	Year	Source
The Bailey Jay Show	2013	
Conversations with Matt Dwyer	2013	
Go from There	2013	
Nerdist	2013	
Sugar and Spice	2013	
This Feels Terrible	2013	
Lady to Lady	2013	
The JV Club	2014	
The Dana Gould Hour	2014	
Baby Geniuses	2016	
Can I Pet Your Dog?	2016	
LGBTQ&A w/ Jeffery Masters	2017	
QUEERY with Cameron Esposito	2017	
Forever 35	2018	

== Filmography ==
=== Film ===
Title	Year	Credited as				Role	Notes
Title	Year	Writer	Executive Producer	Animation/Art department	Other	Role	Notes
Super	2010	No	No	Yes	No		Animation supervisor
Dreamworld	2012	No	No	Yes	No		Animation supervisor
Big Miracle	2012	No	No	Yes	No		Animation supervisor
Movie 43	2013	No	No	Yes	No		Animation producer for "Beezel" segment
Half Like Me	2015	No	No	Yes	No		Animation producer
Ugly Mutt	2015	No	Yes	No	No	Voice of Bully Poodle	Animation producer
Ever After High: Dragon Games	2016	Yes	No	No	No		
Iris Opener	2017	Yes	No	No	Yes	Voice of Cornelius	
Brightburn	2019	No	No	No	Yes		Illustrator

=== Television ===
Title	Year	Credited as				Role	Notes
Title	Year	Writer	Executive producer	Producer	Animation/Art department	Role	Notes
Yo Gabba Gabba!	2007–2019	No	No	No	Yes		Animation supervisor
Mystery Science Theater 3000	2007	No	No	Yes	Yes		Animation producer
Hard 'n Phirm's Musical Timehole	2011	No	No	Yes	No		Producer of pilot
Chris Hardwick: Mandroid	2012	No	No	No	Yes		Animation supervisor
Mad	2012–2013	No	No	No	Yes		Animation supervisor of 13 episodes
The Aquabats! Super Show!	2013	No	No	No	Yes		Animation supervisor of five episodes
Parks and Recreation	2014	No	No	No	Yes		Animation supervisor of "New Slogan".
Her Story	2015	No	No	No	Yes		Title designer
Gortimer Gibbon's Life on Normal Street	2015	No	No	Yes	Yes		Animation director on "Gortimer vs. The Terrible Touch-Up".
Chris Hardwick: Funcomfortable	2016	No	No	No	Yes		Title sequence & vfx producer
Slumber Party	2016	No	No	No	Yes	Herself	Appears in the episode "Shadi Petosky".
Danger & Eggs	2017	Yes	Yes	No	Yes	Voiced six characters. (Note: Pigeon Lady, Duncan, The Hugging Astronaut, Hot Dog Vendor, Flushing Guy, and Parched Runner)	Voice director for five episodes; casting director for four episodes
555	2017	No	No	No	Yes	Played Makeup Woman 1	
Twelve Forever	2019	No	Yes	No	No		
Forever Alone	2020	No	Yes	No	No		
Somewhere I Am	2022	Yes	Yes	No	No		Unproduced television pilot; sold to and developed for HBO Max
The Sandman	2022	Yes	No	No	No		
Clean Slate	2025	Yes	No	Yes	No		
