= Netflix Studios =

Netflix Studios may refer to:

- Netflix Hollywood Studios
- Netflix Albuquerque Studios
- London Shepperton Studios
- Vancouver Martini Studios
- Madrid Tres Cantos Studios
