= Danger & Eggs =

Television series

- Genre: Comedy
- Created by: Mike Owens; Shadi Petosky
- Directed by: Vincent Proce; Drew Schmidt; Sarah Seember Huisken
- Voices of: Aidy Bryant; Eric Knobel
- Theme music composer: Andy Bean
- Composer: Andy Bean
- Country of origin: United States
- No. of episodes: 13 (25 segments)

Production
- Executive producers: Mike Owens; Shadi Petosky; Vincent Stall; Chris Hardwick
- Producers: Will McRobb; Brian Sheesley
- Animator: Saerom Animation
- Editors: Carrie Shanahan; Matt Steinauer
- Running time: 24 minutes
- Production companies: Amazon Studios; PUNY

Original release
- Network: Amazon Video
- Release: June 30, 2017

Danger & Eggs is an American animated series created by Mike Owens and Shadi Petosky that premiered on Amazon Video on June 30, 2017. The show focuses on the adventures of a cyan-haired teenaged girl and her giant anthropomorphic egg friend.

== Plot ==
D.D. Danger, an imaginative thrill seeker, and her best friend, a lawful good, safety-first anthropomorphic egg named Phillip, experience a series of chaotic adventures as they "do stuff".

== Cast ==
=== Main ===
- Aidy Bryant as D.D. Danger, an imaginative, energetic young girl with an adventurous spirit, the latest in a long line of thrill-seeking daredevils and stuntmen, always on the lookout for an undaunted (and oftentimes reckless) stunt.
- Eric Knobel as Phillip, a cautious, borderline-hypochondriacal giant egg with a wide variety of oddly useful professions. He monitors D.D. in their friendship and tries to keep her from doing anything too crazy.

=== Recurring ===
- Shadi Petosky as Pigeon Lady/Duncan
- Stephanie Beatriz as Sheriff Luke/Captain Banjo Kid
- Kimberly Brooks as Kimmy
- Parvesh Cheena as Gomez
- Jessica DiCicco as Felicia
- Ben Diskin as Tappy
- Keith Ferguson as BL1P/Crackers
- Jasika Nicole as Reina. She is a creative femme girl.
- Angelica Ross as the mayor
- Brennan Murray as Tyronius
- Michael Ritchie as Corporate Raider Jim. He is a business executive who has two fathers.

=== Guest ===
- Kate Berlant as Rhonda the Realtor
- River Butcher as Sweet
- Felicia Day as Francesca
- Cameron Esposito as Rad
- Tyler Ford as Milo, non-binary musician
- Chris Hardwick as Pete Peril
- Jazz Jennings as Zadie. She is a transgender singer.
- Kate Micucci as herself
- Lori Petty as Ruelle/Madame Aubergine
- Dannah Phirman as Gale/Lint Kid/Hamster
- Jonah Ray as Security Person/Jonah
- Sam Riegel as Phillip's Brother
- Michaela Watkins as Life Coach Nancy
- Mary Elizabeth Winstead as Trix Blixon
- "Weird Al" Yankovic as Polka Sven
- Lo Mutuc (Note: credited as Charlyne Yi) as Layla
- Laura Zak as Troll

== Production ==
Series creator Shadi Petosky told NewNowNext in 2017 that the show tries to be inclusive as possible without having crushes or romantic relationships at all, calling it a "challenge" without reverting to a stereotype, noting that she and the show's crew wanted to display "innocent LGBTQ friendships, before the age of romantic connections," without the use of metaphors. She also pushed to have an episode on Pride which was not buried in an allegory and stated that there were "queer people in every aspect of production." In an interview with Nerdist, Petosky said that she and the crew were aiming to create a series "that both kids and parents could enjoy together for same reasons." Mike Owens, the show's co-creator, Aidy Bryant, and Eric Knobel spoke to Phillip as a character and how the show treated him, saying it was different than other shows. Nicole, who voices Reina, argued that the show is a "wonderful tool" to help get kids talking about LGBTQ issues at "a young age" while Beatriz, who voices two characters, said that she was astounded by the season finale, saying it has a "huge message to give to a child." Petosky later described the protagonist as "gender-free female lesbian child" and said that she, and the show's cast, wanted to be overt about LGBT representation rather than having "metaphors and hidden symbology" within the series.

Petosky told journalists for Insider in June 2021 that she experienced many challenges in production, noting there were "little arguments, and battles, and suspensions" throughout production, and having to fight to get the word "Pride" in the show with the help of GLAAD.

== Episodes ==
| No. in series | Title | Directed by | Written by | Original release date |
|---|---|---|---|---|
| 1a | "Tube of Pain" | Mike Owens | Shadi Petosky | June 30, 2017 |
D.D. and Phillip plan out an extreme obstacle run, but get sidetracked by Chickenpaw Park's weirdest water slide.
| 1b | "Broccoli" | Mike Owens | Amalia Levari (story), Sofiya Alexandra & Courtney Kocak | June 30, 2017 |
When Phillip discovers that he likes broccoli, he realizes he may be an adult. D.D. helps prepare her friend for his new grown-up responsibilities before it's too late.
| 2a | "Ren Faire" | Sarah Seember Huisken | Shadi Petosky (story), Laura Zak | June 30, 2017 |
Danger and Phillip enter medieval times. They aren't too happy in a world where the Knight Tyronius has to save Princess Reina. Boring. There has to be a better way.
| 2b | "Satellite Gardens" | Drew Schmidt | Eric Knobel | June 30, 2017 |
D.D. and Phillip get separated in a strange, hidden garden where things aren't as they seem.
| 3a | "Raccoons" | Mike Owens | Shadi Petosky | June 30, 2017 |
D.D. and Phillip save an injured raccoon with a undefeatable quest for intelligence who takes an interest in Phillip's inventions.
| 3b | "Sheriff Luke" | Vincent Proce | Eric Knobel | June 30, 2017 |
It's Give a Chicken a Medal Day and Phillip wants everyone to play safe. Sharp-tongued Sheriff Luke wants to help, but takes it too far.
| 4a | "Keep Off the Grass" | Mike Owens | Bob Mittenthal | June 30, 2017 |
Layla is always bored. On a mission to prove to her how exciting the park is, D.D. ends up leading them to an wacky underground world.
| 4b | "Pennies" | Vincent Proce | Eric Knobel (story), Will McRobb | June 30, 2017 |
When Phillip clears the pennies from the fountain, he un-wishes everyone's hopes and dreams. He and D.D. must make the city believe in itself again before everyone descends into madness.
| 5a | "Finding Cheryl" | Sarah Seember Huisken | May Chan | June 30, 2017 |
Phillip and D.D. want to jam at the bandshell. But first they must navigate an office building and find the elusive Cheryl to get permission.
| 5b | "The Trio" | Sarah Seember Huisken | Ben Joseph | June 30, 2017 |
Milo, the third member of D.D. and Phillip's Bawk Bawk Trio, is moving away. D.D. and Phillip try to convince them to stay as they work through the seven stages of grief.
| 6a | "Pete Peril" | Mike Owens | Bob Mittenthal | June 30, 2017 |
Famous daredevil Pete Peril comes to town and threatens D.D.'s father's stunting record.
| 6b | "PhillipCon" | Sarah Seember Huisken | Will McRobb (story), Sophie Pustil & Paul Jaffe | June 30, 2017 |
D.D and Phillip go to a convention where everyone's name is Phillip.
| 7a | "Hide" | Drew Schmidt | Joe Stillman | June 30, 2017 |
The ultimate game of hide-and-seek leads D.D and Phillip to a deserted island that threatens their friendship.
| 7b | "Alligator King" | Drew Schmidt | Shadi Petosky (story), Alex Fox & Rachel Lewis | June 30, 2017 |
Duncan is back and will do anything to make friends... including feeding D.D. and Phillip to albino alligators and hoarding all of the park's water, plunging it into a drought.
| 8a | "Morning Routine" | Sarah Seember Huisken | Alex Fox & Rachel Lewis | June 30, 2017 |
When D.D. forces Phillip on an early-morning walk, they learn that the Pigeon Lady has been guarding an ancient secret.
| 8b | "Lost & Found" | Drew Schmidt | Bob Mittenthal | June 30, 2017 |
The world's coolest pair of rollerskates are turned in to Phillip's Lost and Found booth, and D.D. will do anything to have them.
| 9a | "Dog Park" | Sarah Seember Huisken | Laura Zak | June 30, 2017 |
D.D. and Phillip discover that the dogs of Chickenpaw Dog Park don't just look like their owners -- they predict the future.
| 9b | "Trading Post" | Drew Schmidt | Sophie Pustil & Paul Jaffe (story), Eric Knobel | June 30, 2017 |
Phillip and D.D. go to a secret, underground trading post and end up in a trade war of toys, wares, and maybe even their friendship.
| 10a | "Check Mates" | Drew Schmidt | Bob Mittenthal | June 30, 2017 |
D.D. wants to prove to Phillip that a game with no rules can be just as fun as one with them, unleashing chaos.
| 10b | "Pirate Gorgeous" | Sarah Seember Huiskin | Sofiya Alexandra (story), Eric Knobel | June 30, 2017 |
The friends perform a pirate-themed play and Phillip wants to be seen as a true performer, not just as an egg.
| 11a | "Chill Twins" | Drew Schmidt | Sofiya Alexandra & Courtney Kocak | June 30, 2017 |
D.D. and Phillip must inspire the community to save a beloved historical landmark from being demolished by Corporate Raider Jim.
| 11b | "Nightmare" | Vincent Proce | Alex Fox & Rachel Lewis | June 30, 2017 |
D.D. is having nightmares and Phillip must overcome his biggest fear to help his best friend.
| 12a | "The Big Z" | Sarah Seember Huisken | Joe Stillman | June 30, 2017 |
A fun romp to find one of the Eight Thrilling Wonders of Chickenpaw Park turns into a deadly race against time when D.D suffers a severe asthma attack.
| 12b | "Trix Blixon" | Drew Schmidt | Sofiya Alexandra & Courtney Kocak | June 30, 2017 |
Skate Action Star Trix Blixon arrives ready to join Phillip and D.D. Danger to take on a winterized extreme obstacle run.
| 13 | "Chosen Family" | Sarah Seember Huisken and Drew Schmidt | Shadi Petosky | June 30, 2017 |
It's the Pride Festival in Chickenpaw Park and D.D. and Phillip's favorite day is interrupted by Captain Banjo of H.A.R.M. blowing everything out of proportion and unleashing a rampaging super weapon that threatens to destroy the park and everyone in it.

== Reception ==
Danger & Eggs has received positive reviews. Trish Benedix of NewNowNext described the series as the "queerest show on television," noting that it includes "trans youth, gay dads...[and] a lesbian folk duo" and noted that many of the show's characters are "voiced by LGBT talent." Nico Lang of The Daily Dot called the series an "acid trip worth taking" which can appeal to fans of Adventure Time and called the show "fast, wild, and inventive," constantly throwing new jokes and characters "at the audience." Lang also described the series "consistently warm and witty," even referencing shows like Rick and Morty, praised the voice cast, and called it "quietly groundbreaking." Donnie Lederer of Nerdist noted that the series confronts water slides, underground labs, and issues like "politics, gender, and sexual identity," remaining watchable to adults and kids at the same time.

Autostraddle reviewers lauded the series for its LGBT representation such as the non-binary character Milo (voiced by agender activist and model Tyler Ford), and the series finale taking place during a Pride festival. Emily Ashby of Common Sense Media called the series a "hilarious, adventurous buddy comedy [that] will delight kids," praising its "bold animation" and the enthusiasm of characters to live their lives to the fullest and remind "kids of the value of taking chances and trying new things." Robert Hutton of Screen Rant described the series as a family-oriented series which went "under the radar" and said that it could appeal to fans of series like Steven Universe. Owl Fisher and Fox Fisher of The Guardian praised the series for its transgender characters and other LGBTQ characters, and said that it is a "great choice for families to watch together" while showing LGBTQ characters in a "really simple and normalised way." In June 2021, journalist Abbey White described the series as one of the recent "overtly queer" series, noting She-Ra and the Princesses of Power and Steven Universe as other examples.

=== Awards and nominations ===
| Year | Award | Category | Nominee(s) | Result |
|---|---|---|---|---|
| 2018 | Daytime Emmy Award | Outstanding Directing in an Animated Program | Mike Owens, Brian Sheesley, Vincent Proce, Drew Schmidt, Sarah Seember Huisken, Shadi Petosky and Sam Riegel | Won |
| 2018 | Critics' Choice Movie Awards | Best Animated Series | Danger & Eggs | Nominated |
