= Non-binary characters in fiction =

Representation of non-binary genders in fiction

Non-binary (also spelled nonbinary) or genderqueer is a spectrum of gender identities that are not exclusively masculine or feminine‍—‌identities that are outside the gender binary. Non-binary identities can fall under the transgender umbrella, since many non-binary people identify with a gender that is different from their assigned sex. Another term for non-binary is enby (from the abbreviation "NB"). This page examines non-binary characters in fictional works as a whole, focusing on characters and tropes in cinema and fantasy.

For more information about fictional characters in other parts of the LGBTQ community, see the corresponding pages about pansexual, intersex, and gay characters in fiction.

== Non-binary characters and tropes ==
Much like with gay and transgender characters, representation of non-binary characters is small. Eighty percent of non-binary people noted in a survey from Trans Media Watch that they felt media coverage of non-binary characters is poor. The Daily Dot has noted that in Japanese media, genderqueer identities are often portrayed as a joke, featuring "flamboyantly gay people who crossdress" rather than serious explorations of gender performance. However, in May 2015, Flavorwire stated that genderqueer characters are getting "increasing critical and aesthetic prominence" in literature.

=== Steven Universe and beyond ===
Some franchises alleviated that concern. For instance, the Steven Universe franchise, from 2013 to 2020, included various non-binary characters, including all Gem characters, since series creator Rebecca Sugar stated that the Gems are "all non-binary women". One prominent character is Stevonnie, who is a fusion of Steven and Connie. Steven and Connie identify as male and female respectively, but the gender of Stevonnie is difficult to describe, with series creator Rebecca Sugar describing it as the "living relationship between Steven and Connie". Stevonnie is commonly referred to with gender neutral pronouns (such as the singular they), while male and female characters seem to be physically attracted to Stevonnie.

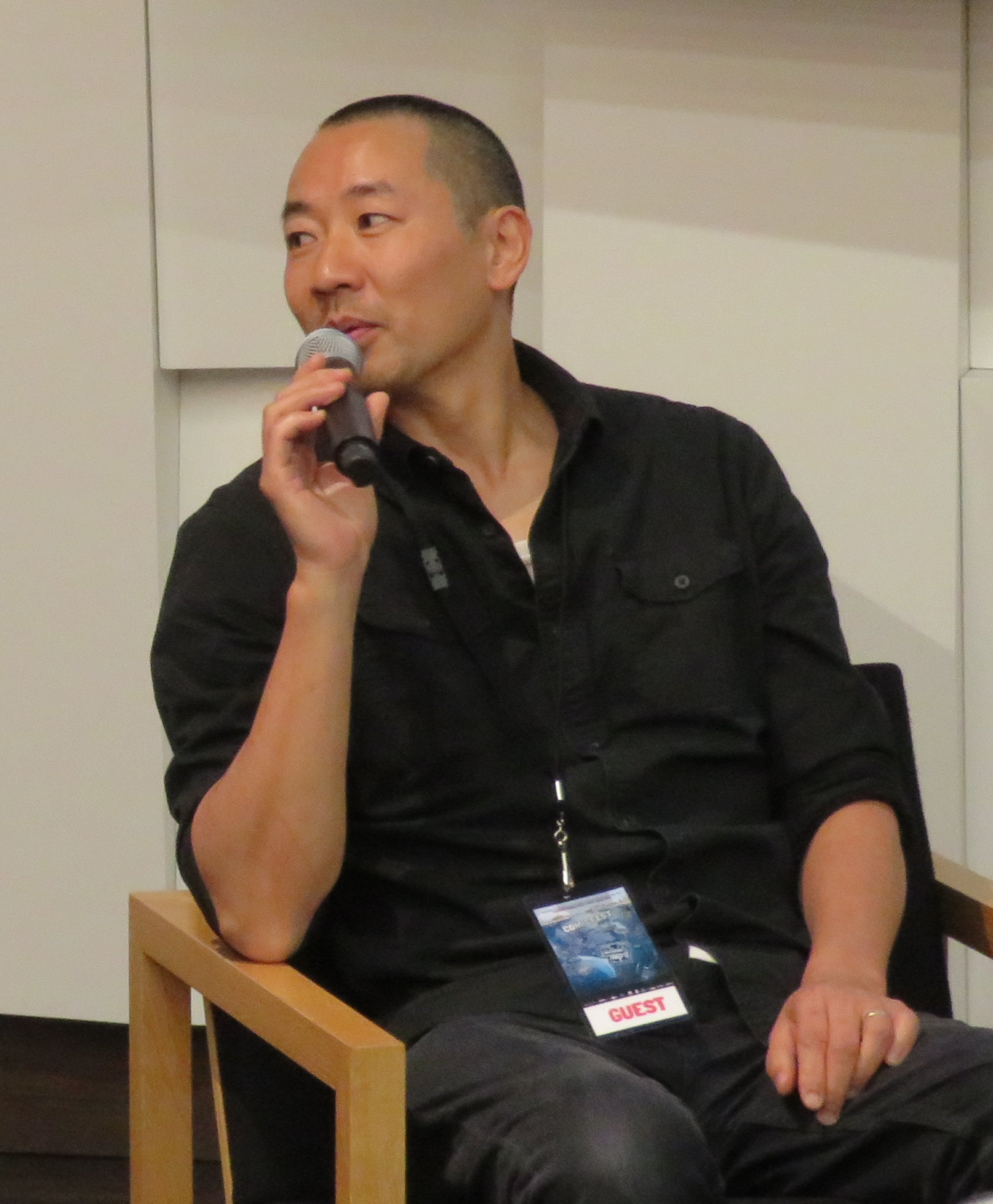
Award winning animator of bro'Town, Ant Sang during Wellington ComicFest 2019 panel "The Ascent of Children's Comics", at National Library of New Zealand in May 2019

Steven Universe is only one of the many animated series with characters that identify outside the gender binary. One of the first characters was Princess Sapphire in Princess Knight. Sapphire was raised as a boy by her father because women are not eligible to inherit the throne; this storyline has led some reviewers to interpret her as genderqueer. Kino's Journey, featured another character outside the binary. The protagonist, Kino, was assigned female at birth, but has an "androgynous persona", alternating between using feminine and masculine pronouns, while resisting those that attempt to pin a gender on them as a "girl" or "boy". This led some reviewers to call Kino one of the "rare transmasculine anime protagonists". bro'Town featured Brother Ken is fa'afafine, a Samoan concept for a third gender, a person who is born biologically male but is raised and sees themself as female. Violet Harper/Halo in Young Justice is genderqueer, not identifying as male or female.

In 2011, Nathan Seymour / Fire Emblem was a character in Tiger & Bunny. Nathan is a highly effeminate homosexual man who identifies as genderqueer though he prefers to be identified as a woman at times, often spending more time with the female heroes while flirting with the male heroes. Knights of Sidonia featured another character outside the binary. Izana Shinatose belongs to a new, nonbinary third gender that originated during the hundreds of years of human emigration into space. Milo in Danger & Eggs, an agender character, who uses they/them pronouns, first appeared. Milo later forms a band with the show's protagonists, DD Danger and Philip, named the Buck Buck Trio and play a music festival together. Tyler Ford, an agender model and speaker is the voice of Milo, said they loved that their character, is an "accurate representation" of them. Stars Align featured Yū Asuka, a character who is not sure of whether they are "binary trans, x-gender, or something else entirely" and is still figuring their gender identity.

=== Other series and films ===
While animation has various characters outside the gender binary, there are some in other mediums. In 1976, the novel Two Strand River included Alan / Leslie, a genderfluid character, making it one of the earliest literary novels to star a genderfluid character. In the comic The Sandman, Desire is both male and female, because the character represents everything someone might desire. Little Horse in Little Big Man is a two-spirit character. In the 2017 film, They, J is a trans teen on puberty blockers who needs to decide their gender before meeting with a doctor, with J saying they feel male, female, or neither at various times. The actor, Fehrenbacher, was also undergoing gender transition at the time of filming. In a film the following year, Upgrade, Jamie is a hacker not identifying with any of the genders, requesting that the protagonist not ask their gender, In the 2019 Hollywood blockbuster, John Wick: Chapter 3 – Parabellum, there is a character named The Adjudicator. This character does not have a specified gender in the script since Asia Kate Dillon, a nonbinary person, came up with the idea of making their character nonbinary while talking with the director. In the series Magnus Chase and the Gods of Asgard, a member of the main cast is Alex Fierro, a genderfluid character who often uses she/her pronouns.

Live-action television series included various characters outside the gender binary. For instance, Sam Malloy in the 2007–2008 series The Riches is transgender and frequently dresses in feminine clothing. The idea for Sam's non-binary gender expression came about before Izzard, a gender non-conforming comedian, joined the show. Sam's gender expression is accepted and respected by the Malloy parents and siblings. Janet in the 2016–2020 series The Good Place is a non-human, genderless entity who uses she/her pronouns, and corrects other characters who attempt to gender her by saying she is "not a girl". The Switch featured Zoey, a feisty "transgender genderqueer" woman who is guarded by her neighbor, Detective Sandra McKay, a cisgender lesbian. Lommie Thorne in Nightflyers is a genderfluid cyber technician specialist who prefers to interface with computers more than humans. Good Trouble included a non-binary character. Joey Riverton comes out as nonbinary to their cisgender lesbian girlfriend, Alice, and begins using they/them pronouns, Lindsay Brady in the same show is also non-binary. Bishop in Deputy is considered the first non-binary character on broadcast television. Ripley Lennox in Hollyoaks runs a shop for second-hand clothes and befriends some of the show's younger characters like Peri Lomax and Romeo Quinn, while she is a friend of Tom Cunningham, a regular character, and are non-binary. The 2018 manga Love Me for Who I Am features a nonbinary protagonist, Mogumo, who explicitly tells other characters that they are neither male nor female.

== Prominent examples ==
Apart from the above-listed examples, there are some other characters that stand out apart from the rest. Pythio in Head Over Heels is non-binary; Musidorus in the same play comes out by saying that they are both a son and daughter to their mother-in-law; May in & Juliet is defined as a character who is "not [confined] to any bracket of gender"; and Oscar François de Jarjayes in The Rose of Versailles is genderqueer.

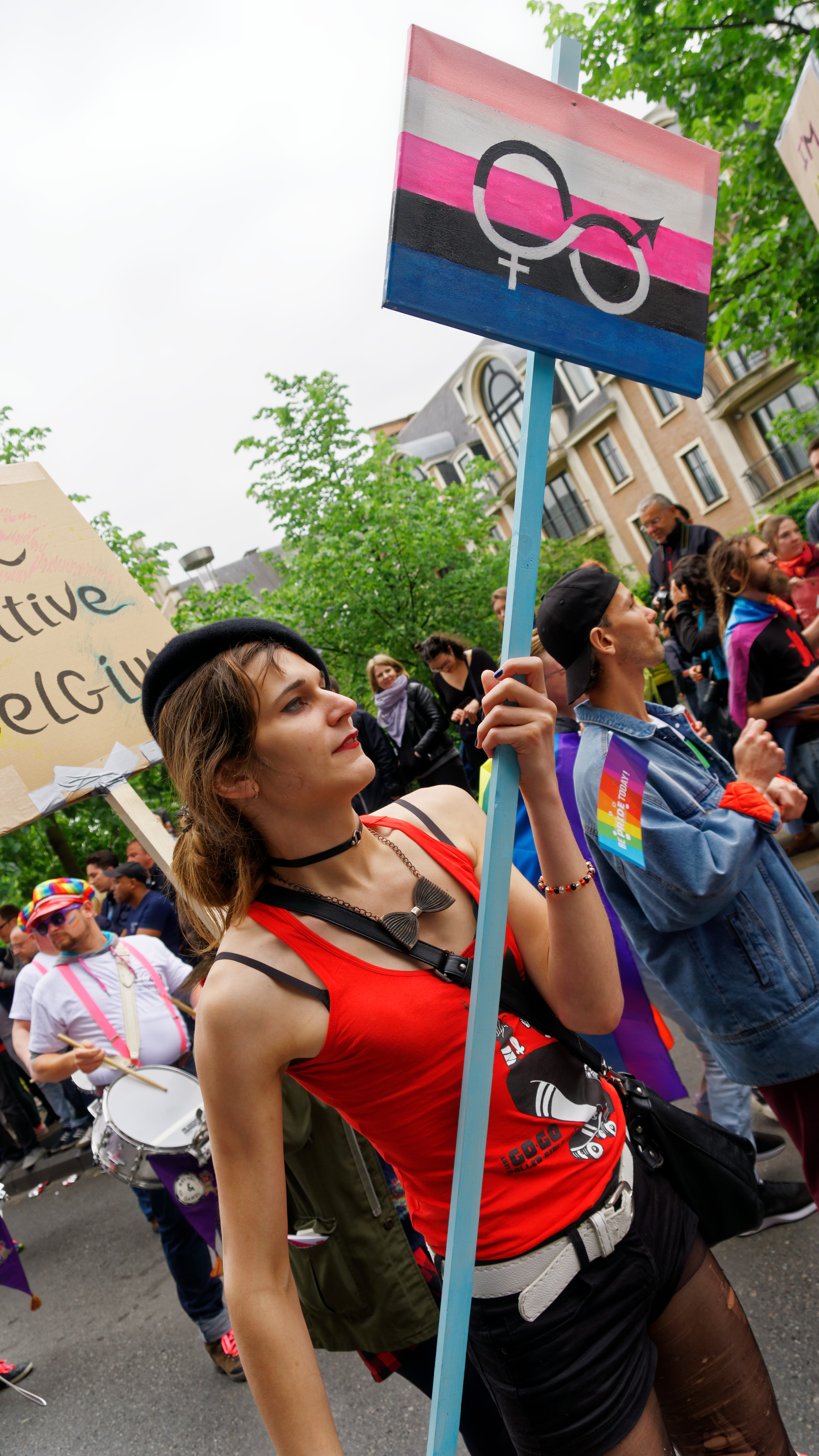
Person with a genderfluid flag at a Belgian Pride Parade in May 2018

Animation has led the way when it comes to representation. Angel in the ongoing all-ages animation, Craig of the Creek is agender, and uses they/them pronouns. They are voiced by Angel Lorenzana who is a storyboard artist and writer for the show, who identifies as agender and uses the same pronouns. In later tweets, they added that their "cartoon self" used they/them before themselves, gave a shoutout to the show's crew, and said that while this is a small contribution to LGBT representation, they hope "fans can take comfort knowing that there's also non-binary people working behind the scenes" on every of the show's episodes. Additionally, Asher in the 2020 young adult animation, Kipo and the Age of Wonderbeasts is non-binary and uses they/them pronouns, which was later confirmed by Bill Wolkoff, co-screenwriter of Kipo. Another animation which ended in 2020 included a non-binary character: She-Ra and the Princesses of Power. In that series, Double Trouble was described by series creator ND Stevenson as a "nonbinary shapeshifting mercenary". They are voiced by Jacob Tobia, a non-binary person. The Dragon Prince and Gen:Lock both feature non-binary characters. In the first show, Kazi in The Dragon Prince, the Sunfire Elf sign language interpreter, goes by they/them pronouns. Val/entina is genderfluid.

In literature, a few examples that stand out. The novel On Steel Breeze featured a non-binary character. Travertine in the novel uses ve/ver pronouns, and there is no mention of it being unusual in the book. The film The Kings of Summer included an agender character, named Biaggio, who states that he does not see himself as having a gender. In the novel series, Star Wars: Aftermath, Eleodie Maracavanya, a pirate ruler, had a prominent role, referred to by either male, female or gender-neutral pronouns like zhe or zher. Symptoms of Being Human featured a character outside the gender binary. Riley Cavanaugh writes a viral blog about being genderfluid, and struggles to come out to parents and friends, using they/them pronouns often. The following year, The Carmilla Movie had a non-binary character. S. LaFontaine, in this movie, uses singular they/them pronouns.

Literature and animation are not the only media which includes such characters. Miss Bruce in the series Star is a fierce genderfluid person who became a fan favorite. In One Day at a Time began, Syd, uses singular they/them pronouns. Syd is the "sydnificant" other of Elena Maria Alvarez Riera Calderón Leyte-Vidal Inclán. The latter is an activist and feminist teenage daughter of Penelope who later discovers that she is lesbian and comes out to her family. Adira Tal in Star Trek: Discovery is the first non-binary character in the Star Trek universe, and a highly intelligent character on the USS Discovery, and unexpectedly becomes friends with Lt. Commander Paul Stamets and Dr. Hugh Culber. Adira is also an introvert who does not originally tell the crew they are non-binary, using she/her pronouns until episode 8 when Adira comes out as non-binary and asks to be referred to as "they or them". Hedwig and the Angry Inch featured a genderqueer character named Hedwig Robinson. The creator of both described Hedwig as "more than a woman or a man. She's a gender of one." There is Eth in Eth's Skin, which has run from 2014 to the present. Eth uses singular they/them pronouns in the webcomic, with author Sfé Monster stating that Eth presents and identifies as gender-neutral.

== See also ==
- List of fictional non-binary characters
- List of non-binary characters in animation
- Discrimination against non-binary people
- Legal recognition of non-binary gender
- List of animated series with LGBT characters
- List of fictional polyamorous characters
- Media portrayal of asexuality
- Lists of LGBT figures in fiction and myth
