= List of fictional non-binary characters =

This is a list of fictional non-binary characters (i.e. genderqueer) identified as non-binary in anime, animation, print media, feature films, live-action television, theatre, video games, webcomics, and other mediums.

Queer identifications listed include characters of non-binary gender, agender, bigender, genderfluid, genderqueer, as well as characters of any third gender.

For more information about fictional characters in other identifications of the LGBTQ community, see the lists of lesbian, gay, bisexual, transgender, intersex, aromantic, asexual, and pansexual characters.

The names are organized alphabetically by surname (i.e. last name), or by single name if the character does not have a surname. If more than two characters are in one entry, the last name of the first character is used.

== Books, print comics, and manga ==
Character	Title	Author	Identity	Year	Notes
Aim/the Messenger	Nona the Ninth	Tamsyn Muir	Ambiguous/non-binary	2022	Aim uses they/them pronouns that were "bestowed upon them" by their role as the Messenger (whether these pronouns are singular or plural is ambiguous), is referred to with she/her pronouns and as "sir" by multiple characters, and has been stated by Tamsyn Muir to "live with bestowed pronouns and is violently proud of them while at the same time quite likes experiencing what other pronouns mean."
Alan	Two Strand River	Keith Maillard	Genderfluid	1976	One of the earliest literary novels to star gender-fluid characters.
Alanna of Trebond	The Song of the Lioness	Tamora Pierce	Genderfluid	1983–1988	Though the book itself never mentions her to be genderfluid, Pierce said in December 2019 that "Alanna has always defied labels. She took the best bits of being a woman and a man, and created her own unique identity. I think the term is 'gender-fluid', though there wasn't a word for this (to my knowledge) when I was writing her."
Annabel	Annabel	Kathleen Winter	Genderfluid	2010	Born intersex and assigned male at birth, Wayne sometimes takes on the name "Annabel".
The Beetle	The Beetle	Richard Marsh	Genderfluid	1897	The villain of the novel, simply called the Beetle, is an Egyptian shapeshifter who appears as both male and female throughout the book.
Riley Cavanaugh	Symptoms of Being Human	Jeff Garvin	Genderfluid	2016	Riley writes a viral blog about being genderfluid, and struggles to come out to parents and friends, using they/them pronouns often.
Chick the Cherub	John Dough and the Cherub	L. Frank Baum	Ambiguous	1906	Chick the Cherub is a human child whose gender is ambiguous throughout the book.
Crona	Soul Eater	Atsushi Ohkubo	Unknown/Ambiguous	2010	Crona is a demon sword master, and they appear as an antagonist under the orders of Medusa for the first part of the series (manga and anime). Their gender is never mentioned throughout the series, however the author explicitly stated that their gender is unknown. In the Japanese text, they are referred to using gender-neutral pronouns.
Dust Devil	My Little Pony	Jeremy Whitley	Non-binary	2020	Dust Devil is a non-binary abada who uses singular they/them pronouns.
Elliot	On a Sunbeam	Tillie Walden	Non-binary	2018	Elliot "Ell" is a non-speaking "mechanical genius" who uses they/them singular pronouns.
Alex Fierro	Magnus Chase & the Gods of Asgard	Rick Riordan	Genderfluid	2015	Introduced in the second MCGA book, The Hammer of Thor, Fierro is described as "transgender and gender-fluid," going by both masculine and feminine pronouns depending on state of mind and even changing appearance to suit pronouns.
The Fool (Note: Also uses names like Beloved, Amber, and Lord Golden to describe their gender)	Realm of the Elderlings Series (Note: The Farseer Trilogy, Liveships Trilogy, Tawny Man Trilogy, Fitz & Fool Trilogy)	Robin Hobb	Genderfluid	1995–2017	There is a lot of debate among fans as to what The Fool's biological sex is, but in terms of gender/self identity the Fool canonically identifies as male and female at different times.
Jude Winters; Dallas; Stevie	Jude Saves the World	Ronnie Riley	Non-binary	2023	Jude is a twelve-year old middle-school student who has chosen this name to replace their deadname. Jude wants to be called they/them but is unable to ask their conservative grandparents to do so. Jude has two school friends: Dallas comes out to Jude as being gay while Stevie has a crush on another girl but feels she must hide her feelings. The book sparked political backlash in Texas in 2025.
Oscar François de Jarjayes	The Rose of Versailles	Riyoko Ikeda	Ambiguous	1972–1973	A young queer woman raised as a soldier, dressing and behaving as a man, and is regarded as having a masculine presence by other characters. She also sometimes refers to herself by gender neutral pronouns. She is uncomfortable about presenting feminine and wants to be considered as a "genderless god of war" rather than a "gendered" human being.
Inanna	The Wicked + The Divine	Kieron Gillen	Non-binary	2014	An incarnation of the Sumerian goddess Inanna in the 2014 Recurrence, formerly a teenager called Zahid who had tendency to "blend in". Inanna uses he/him pronouns, except for the last issue in which they use they/them pronouns.
Jan	Mission Child	Maureen F. McHugh	Non-binary	1998	A first-person narrator who was assigned female at birth and, over the course of the novel, lives first as a young woman, then as a man, and ultimately declares that "I am not man or woman, [...] just Jan."
Kinetiq	Sovereign	April Daniels	Genderqueer	2017	Kinetiq is an Iranian-American genderqueer superhero who has light based superpowers.
Leslie	Two Strand River	Keith Maillard	Genderfluid	1976	One of the earliest literary novels to star gender-fluid characters.
Loki	Marvel Universe	Al Ewing	Genderfluid	2014–present	Loki is a shapeshifter who takes on both male and female forms, alternating between using he/him and she/her pronouns, and does not feel like he has a gender or orientation.
Eleodie Maracavanya	Star Wars: Aftermath	Chuck Wendig	Non-binary	2015–2017	A pirate ruler referred to by either male, female or gender-neutral pronouns like "zhe" or "zher".
Mogumo	Love Me for Who I Am	Kata Konayama	Non-binary	2018	Mogumo is an AMAB non-binary high school student who generally presents femme, and is mistaken for a cross-dresser and invited to work at a cross-dresser maid cafe.
Najimi Osana	Komi Can't Communicate	Tomohito Oda	Ambiguous	2016–present	Described as having an ambiguous/unknown gender/sex by official Japanese website.
Niamh	The Kaiju Preservation Society	John Scalzi	Non-binary	2022	Niamh is an Irish astronomer and physicist who travels to another dimension populated by kaiju monsters. Niamh is exclusively referred to with singular they pronouns.
Paul	Nona the Ninth	Tamsyn Muir	Ambiguous	2022	Paul is a fusion of the male Palamedes Sextus and the female Camilla Hect who is referred to with they/them pronouns (whether these pronouns are singular or plural is ambiguous) and whose gender Tamsyn Muir has described as "a clusterfuck".
Porcelain	Secret Six	Gail Simone	Genderfluid	2014–2016	A new member of the Secret Six. When questioned about their gender presentation, replied "Some days I feel like a girl, other days, not-so-much."
Popeye the Sailor	Popeye	E. C. Segar; Doc Winner; Tom Sims; Bela Zaboly; Ralph Stein; Bud Sagendorf; Bobby London; Hy Eisman; R. K. Milholland	Amphibious	1919–present	In a 1954 comic, Popeye says that he "wears both woman's an man's clothes" and refers to his gender as "amphibious". On International Non-Binary People's Day in 2021, the official Popeye Twitter account posted an image of said comic with the caption "It'sk Non-binary Day! Happy skelebration to all me amphibious pals!" In another older comic, Popeye describes himself as "both a mother an' father" to his son Swee'Pea."
Charli Ramsey (Hawkeye)	Ultimate Universe	Deniz Camp	Two-spirit	2023–2026	A Native American who obtained Clint Barton's Hawkeye equipment after Barton discarded it. Initially a solo hero, Ramsey later joins the Ultimates. Ramsey goes by singular they/them pronouns.
Hero Shackleby	River of Teeth	Sarah Gailey	Non-binary or agender	2017	A poisons and demolitions expert and love interest of Houndstooth, Hero goes by singular they/them pronouns, and their gender assigned at birth is never mentioned.
Geoffrey Swivel	The Shepherd's Crown	Terry Pratchett	Agender	2015	Although raised as a boy, Geoffrey decides that they want to become a witch. When asked why they don't want to be a wizard, Geoffrey tells Tiffany Aching that they don't think of themself as a man, or anything really. They are "merely Geoffrey".
Geoffrey Swivel	Tiffany Aching's Guide to Being a Witch	Rhianna Pratchett, Gabrielle Kent	Agender	2023	Although raised as a boy, Geoffrey decides that they want to become a witch. When asked why they don't want to be a wizard, Geoffrey tells Tiffany Aching that they don't think of themself as a man, or anything really. They are "merely Geoffrey".
Travertine	On the Steel Breeze	Alastair Reynolds	Non-binary	2013	Travertine uses "ve/ver" pronouns, and there is no mention of it being unusual in the book.
Hange Zoe	Attack on Titan	Hajime Isayama	Non-binary/Androgynous	2010	They have an androgynous appearance in the manga and is referred to with they/them pronouns. In the anime, Zoe is referred to as female.

== Film ==
Character	Title	Portrayed by	Identity	Year	Notes
The Adjudicator	John Wick: Chapter 3 – Parabellum	Asia Kate Dillon	Non-binary	2019	The character did not have a specified gender in the script; Dillon, a non-binary person, came up with the idea of making their character - while talking with the director.
Alex	After the Hunt	Lío Mehiel	Non-binary	2025	Alex is Maggie's live-in partner.
All	Zoolander 2	Benedict Cumberbatch	Androgyne	2016	All is presented as a famous androgyne supermodel. The character was subject to a large backlash, being described as "an over-the-top, cartoonish mockery of androgyne/trans/non-binary individuals."
A-Spen	Zombies 3	Terry Hu	Non-binary	2022	An unambiguously non-binary space alien. There is a doll for A-Spen, and it will be the first non-binary doll from Disney. The pronouns on the box are they/them in multiple languages.
Biaggio	The Kings of Summer	Moisés Arias	Agender	2013	In the film, Biaggio states that he does not see himself as having a gender.
Bobo	One Battle After Another	Colton Gantt	Non-binary	2025	Bobo is one of Willa's friends.
Cass	Outerlands	Asia Kate Dillon	Non-binary	2025	Cass is a lonely nanny and restaurant server in San Francisco whose is confronted with her own childhood trauma when their coworker leaves Cass in charge of her 11-year old daughter.
Deadeye / Vanessa	Joy Ride	Sabrina Wu	Non-binary	2021	Deadeye is Lolo's eccentric cousin who is obsessed with K-pop.
Glen/Glenda	Seed of Chucky	Billy Boyd	Genderfluid	2004	Although Glen/Glenda was not explicitly identified as genderfluid in the film, their genderfluid identity was confirmed in the Chucky TV series.
Fab G	Cinderella	Billy Porter	Genderless	2021	Fab G is the fairy godparent of Ella.
Frances	Jimpa	Aud Mason-Hyde	Non-binary	2025	Frances travels to Amsterdam with their mother to visit their gay grandfather Jim (known as Jimpa), and wishes to stay with their grandfather for a year.
J	They	Rhys Fehrenbacher	Genderfluid	2017	J is a trans teen on puberty blockers who needs to decide their gender before meeting with a doctor. J says they feel male, female, or neither at various times. The actor, Fehrenbacher, was also undergoing gender transition at the time of filming.
Jamie	Upgrade	Kai Bradley	Non-gendered	2018	A hacker not identifying with any of the genders. Requests that the protagonist not ask their gender, and states that Jamie is not their name and that they do not have a name.
Julia	Rodeo	Julie Ledru	Genderfluid	2022	Julia is a young motorcycle thief in the outskirts of Bordeaux. She was identified as genderfluid by the director Lola Quivoron.
S. LaFontaine	The Carmilla Movie	K Alexander	Non-binary	2017	In this film, and the web series it serves as a sequel to, LaFontaine uses singular they/them pronouns.
Lake Ripple	Elemental	Kai Ava Hauser	Non-binary	2023	Lake Ripple is Wade and Alan's sibling. Lake uses they/them and she/her pronouns. Lake is Pixar's first non-binary character. Lake is voiced by non-binary actor Kai Ava Hauser.
Layla	Layla	Bilal Hasna	Non-binary	2024	Layla is a British-Palestinian non-binary drag queen who falls in love with the marketing executive Max.
Little Horse	Little Big Man	Robert Little Star	Two-spirit	1970	Little Horse is a two-spirit Cheyenne indigenous person.
Hedwig Robinson	Hedwig and the Angry Inch	John Cameron Mitchell	Genderqueer	2001	Hedwig is described by her creator as "more than a woman or a man. She's a gender of one."
Frankie Stein	Monster High: The Movie	Ceci Balagot	Non-binary	2022	Frankie, the child of Frankenstein and of Dr. Stein is a non-binary monster, made of different male and female body parts, who prefers they/them pronouns.
Yivo	Futurama: The Beast with a Billion Backs	David Cross	Non-binary	2008	Yivo is a planet-sized alien with no determinable gender, using neopronouns. Yivo dates, then marries all people of the universe at once. Later, they break up. Afterwards, Yivo remains in a relationship with Colleen O'Hallahan. Some have said that Yivo may have been "the first non-binary character defined as such in animated history."

== Live-action television ==
Character	Show title	Portrayed by	Identity	Year	Notes
Alex	The A List	Rosie Dwyer	Genderqueer	2018–2021	Uses singular they/them pronouns along with she/her pronouns in the show.
Yael Baron	Degrassi: Next Class	Jamie Bloch	Genderqueer	2016–2017	Assigned female at birth, Yael begins to question their identity starting in season 4, before realizing they are genderqueer and uses singular they/them pronouns.
Kai Bartley	Grey's Anatomy	E.R. Fightmaster	Non-binary	2021–present	Uses singular they/them. E.R. Fightmaster is also non-binary and uses they/them pronouns.
Skye Beck	The Summer I Turned Pretty	Elsie Fisher	Non-binary	2023	Introduced in season 2, Skye is the non-binary cousin of the Fisher brothers and uses singular they. They are a socially awkward teenager that becomes close to their cousins when their mom, Julia, makes plans to sell the family’s beach house. They are an original character to the series, not appearing in the novels the television show is based on.
Bishop	Deputy	Bex Taylor-Klaus	Non-binary	2020	Bishop is considered the first non-binary character on broadcast television.
Cal Bowman	Sex Education	Dua Saleh	Non-binary	2021–2023	Cal is a non-binary student at Moordale Secondary School, introduced in season 3. The headmistress, Hope Haddon, tries to force Cal to wear the girls' uniform, but Cal repeatedly defies Hope by wearing the boys' uniform instead. Uses singular they/them pronouns.
Lindsay Brady	Good Trouble	River Butcher	Non-binary	2019–2024	Uses singular they/them pronouns.
Sah Brockner	Casualty	Arin Smethurst	Non-binary	2021–present	Sah is a non-binary paramedic who uses singular they/them pronouns.
Miss Bruce	Star	Miss Lawrence	Genderfluid	2017	Bruce is a fierce genderfluid person who became a fan favorite for those who watched the show.
Carlos Cervantez	The Winchesters	Jojo Fleites	Non-binary	2022–2023	Cervantes is a demon hunter.
Chris	The Switch	Amy Fox	Non-binary	2016	Chris uses "zie/zir" pronouns in the show.
Danny the Street	Doom Patrol	(N/A)	Genderqueer	2019–2022	Danny is a sentient street who communicates through writing on street signs. They are explicitly referred to as non-binary and genderqueer onscreen.
Des	Grown-ish	Egypt Franklin	Genderfluid, Non-binary	2021–2024	Des, a queer, genderfluid, and pansexual athlete is a possible love interest of the character Jazz.
Desire	The Sandman	Mason Alexander Park	Non-binary	2022–2025	Like their comics counterpart, Desire is androgynous in appearance and is referred to with gender-neutral language and they/them pronouns, as well as being played by a non-binary actor.
Che Diaz	And Just Like That...	Sara Ramirez	Non-binary	2025	Diaz is a stand-up comic and podcast host.
The Doctor	Doctor Who	Various	Genderfluid	1963–1989, 1996, 2005–present	The Doctor presents variously as male and female throughout the series, being referred to by both male and female pronouns. In the 2023 specials the Doctor says that they use "the" as a pronoun.
Grencia Mars Elijah Guo Eckener	Cowboy Bebop	Mason Alexander Park	Non-binary	2021	Gren is a 29 year old non-binary individual who is connected to Spike and Vicious' past, and is overtly shown as non-binary, as confirmed by Netflix and their voice actor as part of promotional information for the series. Gren describes themselves as "I am both at once, and neither one" in the original anime series the live action is based on, Cowboy Bebop.
Brooke Hathaway	Hollyoaks	Tylan Grant	Non-binary	2018–present	An autistic person who learns about non-binary identities from non-binary friend Ripley Lennox (Ki Griffin). Brooke feels that they relate to the identity.
Cassidy Geoffrey	Abbott Elementary	Sabrina Wu	Non-binary	2021–present	Mx. Geoffrey is the new substitute teacher running Janine's classroom.
GJ	Top of the Lake	Holly Hunter	Ambiguous	2013–2017	GJ is an androgynous Swiss spiritual leader.
Jim Jimenez	Our Flag Means Death	Vico Ortiz	Non-binary, Bisexual	2022–2023	Jim uses they/them pronouns, and they are played by a non-binary actor.
Kelly	Malcolm in the Middle: Life's Still Unfair	Vaughan Murrae	Non-binary	2026	Kelly is Hal and Lois's youngest child, with whom Lois became pregnant in the original series finale.
Jerrie Kennedy	Big Sky	Jesse James Keitel	Non-binary, Transfeminine	2020–2023	Kennedy is one of the first non-binary actors to play a non-binary series regular on primetime television.
S. LaFontaine	Carmilla	K Alexander	Non-binary	2014–2016	Uses singular they/them pronouns.
LJ	The Best Man: The Final Chapters	Eric Scott Ways	Non-binary	2022	LJ is Lance and Mia's oldest child.
Loki Laufeyson	Loki	Tom Hiddleston	Genderfluid	2021–2023	A character from the Marvel Cinematic Universe who first appeared in Thor (2011). Like his comics counterpart and the Norse deity he was based upon, Loki's shapeshifting abilities allow him to change sex at will. In the show, Time Variance Authority paperwork lists Loki's sex as "fluid".
Ripley Lennox	Hollyoaks	Ki Griffin	Non-binary	2020–present	Ripley runs a shop for second-hand clothes and befriends some of the show's younger characters like Peri Lomax (Ruby O'Donnell) and Romeo Nightingale (Owen Warner), while also an established friend of Tom Cunningham (Ellis Hollins). They later come out to their friends as non-binary.
Jordan Li	Gen V	London Thor and Derek Luh	Non-binary, Bigender	2023–present	After being injected with Compound V, Jordan is able to switch sex at will.
Sam Malloy	The Riches	Aidan Mitchell	Non-binary, Trans woman	2007–2008	Sam, the youngest Malloy child, is transgender and frequently dresses in feminine clothing. The idea for Sam's non-binary gender expression came about before Izzard, a gender non-conforming comedian, joined the show. Sam's gender expression is accepted and respected by the Malloy parents and siblings.
Mae Martin	Feel Good	Mae Martin	Non-binary	2020–2021	Mae comes out as non-binary in the second season. (Actor Mae Martin is non-binary.)
Taylor Mason	Billions	Asia Kate Dillon	Non-binary	2016–2023	A non-binary person who uses singular they/them pronouns and has a storyline centered on a romantic relationship. (Note: Even though GLAAD appears to call Mason non-binary and trans, no other source can confirm that Taylor is both.) (2016–present)
Sabi Mehboob	Sort Of	Zaiba Baig	Genderfluid	2021–2023	They are openly gender fluid and uses they/them pronouns.
Mo	Zoey's Extraordinary Playlist	Alex Newell	Genderfluid	2020–2021	He is openly genderfluid, and generally uses he/him pronouns, but is open to the use of any pronouns.
Lucifer Morningstar	The Sandman	Gwendoline Christie	Ambiguous	2022–2025	The show's version of Lucifer is never referred to with any third-person pronouns and is androgynous in appearance.
Darcy Olsson	Heartstopper	Kizzy Edgell	Non-binary	2022–present	Darcy began experimenting with singular they/them pronouns and came out as non-binary in season 3.
Pollution	Good Omens	Lourdes Faberes	Non-binary	2019	Uses singular they/them pronouns; described by book co-author and series writer Neil Gaiman as non-binary.
Joey Riverton	Good Trouble	Daisy Eagan	Non-binary	2019–2024	Joey comes out as non-binary to their girlfriend, Alice, and begins using they/them pronouns.
Sam	Vida	Michelle Badillo	Non-binary	2018–2020	Sam's gender identity was not revealed until their sex scene with Emma Hernandez.
Slug	Ironheart	Shea Couleé	Non-binary	2025	Slug is a hacker from Madripoor and member of Parker Robbins' gang. They are a former drag queen who wants to redistribute wealth from the privileged to the Chicago community, and uses non-binary pronouns.
Syd	One Day at a Time	Sheridan Pierce	Non-binary	2017–2020	Uses singular they/them pronouns. Syd is also the significant other of Elena Maria Alvarez Riera Calderón Leyte-Vidal Inclán, an activist and feminist teenage daughter of Penelope.
Adira Tal	Star Trek: Discovery	Blu del Barrio	Non-binary	2020	Adira, the first non-binary character in the Star Trek universe, is a highly intelligent character on the U.S.S. Discovery and unexpectedly becomes friends with Lt. Commander Paul Stamets and Dr. Hugh Culber. Adira is also an introvert who does not originally tell the crew they are non-binary, using she/her pronouns until episode 8 when Adira comes out as non-binary and asks to be referred to as "they or them".
Tam	Younger	Jesse James Keitel	Genderqueer	2018	Uses singular they/them pronouns.
Lommie Thorne	Nightflyers	Maya Eshet	Genderfluid	2019	Lommie is a gender-fluid cyber technician specialist who prefers to interface with computers more than humans. She uses she/her pronouns.
Xavin	Marvel's Runaways	Clarissa Thibeaux	Genderfluid	2019	Xavin is a blunt, romantic alien who possesses shapeshifting abilities. In the series, Xavin is referred to with both they/them and she/her pronouns.
Zoey	The Switch	Vincent Viezzer	Genderqueer	2016	Zoey is a feisty "transgender genderqueer" woman who is guarded by her neighbor, Detective Sandra McKay, a cisgender lesbian.

== Theatre ==
Character	Title	Original actor	Identity	Premiere	Notes
Jerry/Daphne	Some Like It Hot (musical)	J. Harrison Ghee	Non-binary	2022	Non-binary actor J. Harrison Ghee "shows that masculinity, femininity, and anything in between can live alongside each other — and within one person — bringing new-fashioned sensibilities to an old-fashioned Broadway show."
May	& Juliet	Arun Blair-Mangat	Agender	2019	May is defined as a character who is "not [confined] to any bracket of gender."
Mel	How to Dance in Ohio (musical)	Imani Russell	Non-binary	2023	Mel introduces themselves as non-binary and is played by a non-binary actor.
Musidorus	Head Over Heels	Andrew Durand	Genderfluid	2018	Comes out by saying that they are both a son and daughter to their mother-in-law.
Pythio	Head Over Heels	Peppermint	Non-binary	2018	Pythio is a non-binary character.
Hedwig Robinson	Hedwig and the Angry Inch	John Cameron Mitchell	Genderqueer	1998	Hedwig is described by her creator as "more than a woman or a man. She's a gender of one."
Solar	Over and Out: A New Musical	Sushi Soucy	Non-Binary	2021	Solar is a student at A New School who is trying to contact aliens after stargazing for years and connects with an alien named Nova on their walkie-talkie, with both later striking up a relationship. The Twitter account for the musical confirmed that Solar is non-binary.

== Video games ==
Character	Game	Voice actor	Identity	Year	Notes
Azul	Neo Cab	—N/a	Non-binary	2019	Referred to with they/them pronouns in game, and with a bionic prosthetic arm replacing their arm which was amputated after an accident.
Ash	Wandersong	—N/a	Non-binary	2018	Referred to with they/them pronouns in game. The game creator later confirmed they are a non-binary character.
The Bard	Wandersong	John Robert Matz	Non-binary	2018	The Bard is referred to with singular they/them pronouns, but it is also mentioned that any pronouns are fine for them in a QA session.
Blanche	Pokémon Go	—N/a	Non-binary	2016	Blanche is referred to using singular they/them pronouns in English-language official media.
Bloodhound	Apex Legends	Allegra Clark	Non-binary	2019	Bloodhound is referred to as non-binary and uses singular they/them pronouns.
Bolt	Crypt of the NecroDancer	—N/a	Genderqueer	2015	According to Ted Martens, artist of this video game, Bolt does not identify as "fully as either male or female".
Company Commander	BattleTech	—N/a	Non-binary	2018	The Company Commander is the player character. During character creation, the player can define their name, callsign, and pronouns independently of the portrait or background, potentially making them non-binary. Most hired MechWarriors can also be customized in this way during the game.
Chaos	Hades	Peter Canavese	Non-binary	2019	Characters in-game refer to Primordial Chaos with they/them pronouns. Additionally, they were referred to with such pronouns on the official Chaos Update from Supergiant Games' Twitter.
Mihaly/Coach of "Rather Be"	Just Dance 2023 Edition	—N/a	Non-binary	2022	The coach is referred to with singular they/them pronouns by the official Just Dance Twitter account. The coach is also confirmed to be non-binary in a response to a fan tweet.
Alex Cyprin	Astoria: Fate's Kiss	—N/a	Non-binary	2015	A boss, with whom characters can engage in a romance with, with gender identity that is accepted by other characters. Uses singular they/them pronouns.
Jordan "JD" Davies	Havenfall is For Lovers	—N/a	Non-binary	2017	Uses singular they/them pronouns and is non-binary.
Floofty Fizzlebean	Bugsnax	Casey Mongillo	Non-binary	2020	Floofty Fizzlebean is referred to with they/them pronouns and by another character as their "sibling" in game. Developers have confirmed that they are intended to be non-binary representation.
FL4K	Borderlands 3	SungWon Cho	Non-binary	2019	Fl4k was confirmed non-binary before the game's release, and is referred to with singular they/them pronouns in-game. They also wear a non-binary pride flag pin.
Efrim Waite	Neurocracy	—N/a	Non-binary	2019	Waite is always referred as a single individual using they/them pronouns in the in-game encyclopaedia.
Cirava Hermod	Hiveswap	—N/a	Non-binary	2017	Cirava is referred to with singular they/them pronouns in all official media.
Jo	Angry Birds	—N/a	Non-binary	2023	Jo, a bird of paradise, was first teased on Angry Birds social media pages on June 3, 2023, for Pride Month. They were included in Angry Birds 2 as a limited-time spell called "Jo's Looove Spell Event".
Charun Krojib	Hiveswap	—N/a	Non-binary	2017	Charun is stated by What Pumpkin, the production team, to be non-binary, and is referred to with singular they/them pronouns in all official media.
Lorelei	Borderlands 3	Ciarán Strange	Non-binary	2019	Lorelei is a soldier and former barista who is non-binary and considering gender transition.
Nights	Nights into Dreams	—N/a	Agender	1996	Franchise developer Takashi Iizuka is cited as saying Nights has no gender, and that players were free to apply their own thoughts on Nights' gender if they wanted to. Nights' voice in Journey of Dreams and Racing Transformed is feminine, but the games treat them as agender.
Nights	Nights: Journey of Dreams	Julissa Aguirre	Agender	2007	Franchise developer Takashi Iizuka is cited as saying Nights has no gender, and that players were free to apply their own thoughts on Nights' gender if they wanted to. Nights' voice in Journey of Dreams and Racing Transformed is feminine, but the games treat them as agender.
Nights	Sonic & All-Stars Racing Transformed	Julissa Aguirre	Agender	2012	Franchise developer Takashi Iizuka is cited as saying Nights has no gender, and that players were free to apply their own thoughts on Nights' gender if they wanted to. Nights' voice in Journey of Dreams and Racing Transformed is feminine, but the games treat them as agender.
Dominique Pamplemousse	Dominique Pamplemousse in "It's All Over Once the Fat Lady Sings!"	Dietrich Squinkifer	Genderqueer	2013	Dominique has a masculine appearance and a feminine voice, leading characters to question their gender. When asked if they are male or female, Dominique replies "I'm a detective." The itch.io page for the second and final game in the series describes Dominique as "our favourite genderqueer private detective".
Sackboy	LittleBigPlanet	—N/a	Non-binary	2008	While referred to with he/him pronouns, he is confirmed on social media as non-binary by developer Mark Hall.
Setsu	Gnosia	—N/a	Non-binary	2019	Refers to themselves as non-binary in the game.
Raqio	Gnosia	—N/a	Non-binary	2019	Raqio is referred to with singular they/them pronouns.
Steve	Minecraft	—N/a	Agender	2009	Markus Persson (a.k.a. Notch), the creator of Minecraft, originally envisioned Steve as a non-binary character because "gender isn't a gameplay element". The name "Steve" was initially given to the character as a joke, but Persson later expressed regret over the name because it was a male given name.
Testament	Guilty Gear	Yū Kobayashi; Kayleigh McKee	Agender	1998	Was previously referred to with he/him pronouns in the US due to localization issues. As of 2021's Guilty Gear Strive, Testament is now referred to with singular they/them pronouns and is confirmed by the developers to be agender.
Keo Venzee	Star Wars: Squadrons	—N/a	Non-binary	2020	Venzee is a Rebel pilot with they/them pronouns.
Arin "Pocket" Fairfax	Deadlock		Non-binary	2026	Pocket is a playable character who used they/them pronouns and is confirmed to have used them when they were still Arin by other characters' voicelines.

== Webcomics ==
Character	Title	Author	Identity	Year	Notes
Tilly Birch	Questionable Content	Jeph Jacques	Non-binary	2003–present	Uses singular they/them pronouns. Character first appeared in 2017.
Davepetasprite^2	Homestuck	Andrew Hussie	Non-binary	2009–2016	A fusion of a male character (Dave Strider) and a female character (Nepeta Leijon), Davepetasprite^2 had a short crisis with regards to their gender identity, but quickly settled as non-binary. The character first appeared in 2015.
Eth	Eth's Skin	Sfé R. Monster	Gender-neutral	2014–present	Using singular they/them pronouns in the webcomic, author Sfé Monster has stated that Eth presents and identifies as gender-neutral.
Parker Flores	Chroma Key	Brandon Dumas	Non-binary	2018–2021 (on hiatus)	Parker is in a group of Tokusatsu-inspired heroes. Parker is also non-binary, and some of the narrative conflict comes from characters misgendering them.
Calliope	The Homestuck Epilogues ("Meat")	Andrew Hussie	Non-binary	2009–2019	Comes out as non-binary in the "Meat" path of The Homestuck Epilogues and uses singular they/them pronouns. They first appeared in 2012.
Roxy Lalonde	The Homestuck Epilogues ("Meat")	Andrew Hussie	Non-binary	2009–2019	Comes out as non-binary in the "Meat" path of The Homestuck Epilogues, initially using singular they/them pronouns and later masculine pronouns; in the "Candy" path of The Homestuck Epilogues, Roxy questions her gender, but ultimately continues to identify as female. Character first appeared in 2011.
Lucy Marlowe	Never Satisfied	Taylor Robin	Non-binary	2015–present	Lucy is a non-binary magic apprentice out to prove themselves to an "apathetic master". They use singular they/them pronouns.
Patrick	Strong Female Protagonist	Brennan Lee Mulligan	Genderqueer	2012–present	Patrick does not identify as a person, although primarily uses masculine pronouns. Patrick first appeared in 2012.
Patrick	Strong Female Protagonist	Lee Knox Ostertag	Genderqueer	2012–present	Patrick does not identify as a person, although primarily uses masculine pronouns. Patrick first appeared in 2012.
Rascal	Never Satisfied	Taylor Robin	Non-binary	2015–present	A magic apprentice, who is non-binary. Rascal uses singular they/them pronouns.
R.J.	Paranatural	Zack Morrison	Non-binary	2010–present	R.J. uses singular they/them pronouns.
Ciel Sousa	Serious Trans Vibes	Sophie Labelle	Genderfluid	2014–present	Ciel is a non-binary girl and seventh grader. Ciel is one of the webcomic's protagonists and is dating Eirikur.
Tetsu	Never Satisfied	Taylor Robin	Non-binary	2015–present	A magic apprentice, who is non-binary. Tetsu uses singular they/them pronouns.
Vaarsuvius	The Order of the Stick	Rich Burlew	Genderqueer	2003–present	Vaarsuvius' gender is deliberately ambiguous, and Rich Burlew has stated that descriptions of them as male or female by other characters do not reflect their gender.
Watch	Go Get a Roomie!	Chloé C	Agender	2010–present	Watch is comfortable with whichever pronouns the speaker chooses and does not identify with any particular gender.

== Other ==
Character	Medium	Title	Author	Identity	Year	Notes
Niko Aris	Card game	Magic: The Gathering	Katie Allison, Chris Mooney, Allison Steele, and Lake Hurwitz	Non-binary	2021	Introduced in Kaldheim. Niko Aris uses they/them pronouns.
Bryce Feelid	Web series	Critical Role	Matthew Mercer	Genderfluid	2018–2021	Bryce Feelid is a non-binary character introduced in the second campaign of the show; Feelid uses they/them pronouns, as confirmed by Matthew Mercer on Twitter.
Hollis	Podcast	The Adventure Zone	Griffin McElroy	Non-binary	2018	Leader of the Kepler Stunt Club "The Hornets". Hollis used they/them pronouns.
Imaginos/Desdinova	Albums	Secret Treaties, Imaginos	Sandy Pearlman, Albert Bouchard	Genderfluid	1974, 1988, 2021–present	The character, a shapeshifter, switches between the male identity of Imaginos and the female identity of Desdinova.

== See also ==
- List of bisexual characters in animation
- List of lesbian characters in animation
- List of animated series with LGBT characters
- List of comedy television series with LGBT characters
- List of dramatic television series with LGBT characters: 1960s–2000s
- List of dramatic television series with LGBT characters: 2010–2015
- List of dramatic television series with LGBT characters: 2016–2019
- List of dramatic television series with LGBT characters: 2020s
- List of non-binary people
- List of LGBT characters in television and radio
- List of tomboys in fiction
- Lists of LGBT figures in fiction and myth
- LGBTQ themes in Western animation
- LGBTQ themes in anime and manga
- List of fictional intersex characters
- List of fictional polyamorous characters
- Non-binary characters in fiction
