= Media portrayal of pansexuality =

The portrayals of pansexuality in the media reflect existing societal attitudes towards pansexuality and current media portrayals. Although pansexual characters are not often characters in mass media, they have appeared in various films, TV series, literature, video games, graphic art, and webcomics, sometimes embodying certain tropes in cinema and fantasy. Musicians, actors, and other public personalities have also, in recent years, come out as pansexual, and are focused on with this page.

Pansexual people have a sexual, romantic or emotional attraction towards people regardless of their biological sex or gender identity. While pansexuality is at times viewed as a sexual orientation in its own right, at other times it is viewed as a branch of bisexuality, to indicate an alternative sexual identity.

For more information about fictional characters in other parts of the LGBTQ community, see the pages about homophobia, intersex, non-binary, and gay characters in fiction, or about media portrayal of bisexual, lesbian, asexual, and transgender people.

== Animated series ==
Animated series such as Cardcaptor Sakura, American Dad!, Rick and Morty, OK K.O.! Let's Be Heroes, Big Mouth, and gen:LOCK have featured pansexual characters.

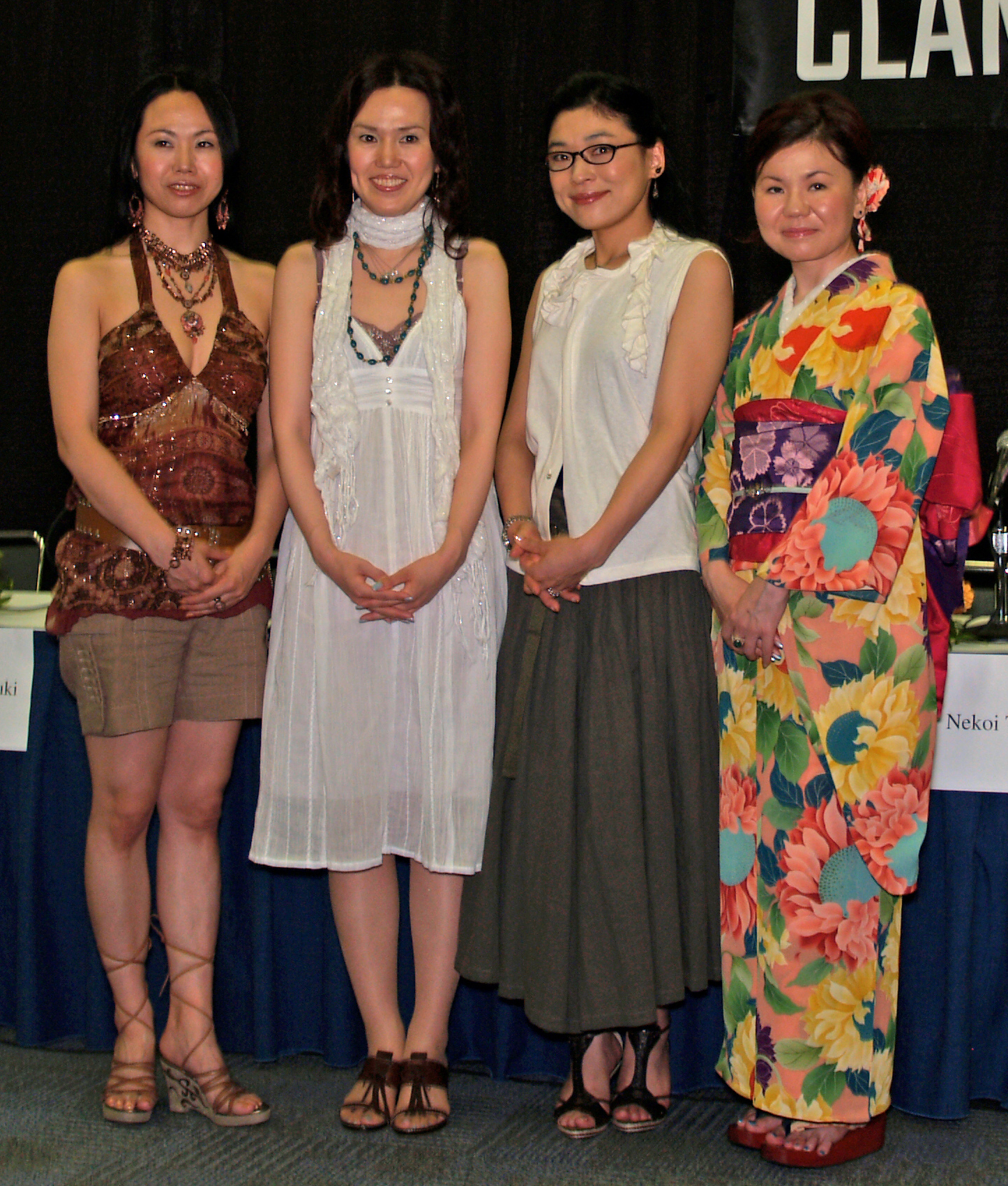
CLAMP are the creators of Cardcaptor Sakura and many other manga which have been turned into anime.

In February 2001, the creators of Cardcaptor Sakura (1998–2000) and Cardcaptor Sakura: Clear Card (2018), and the associated manga with each series, stated that one of the protagonists, Sakura Kinomoto, did not see gender as a barrier for her romantic attraction because she has a "desire to befriend everyone she meets." As such, some have described her as bisexual. She confesses she has a crush on a beautiful female teacher, Kaho Mizuki, with the dubbed version of the anime removing many of these themes. (Note: She always feels happy and dazed when she sees Ms. Mizuki, indicated in episodes such as "Sakura and the Wonderful Teacher" and "Sakura and the Shrine of Memories," with the claim CBR saying that "Sakura does not demonstrate any same-sex attraction in the series itself" but also quoting CLAMP which stated "if Syaoran had been a girl, if they had been far apart in age...I think Sakura would have fallen in love.") Sakura has a crush on Yukito/Yue and later begins a relationship with Syaoran Li.

One of the protagonists of American Dad! (2005–Present), Roger, has been referred to as "omnisexual". Roger's personas have become a major plot device, with his myriad alter egos frequently being the subject or facilitator of an episode's main story or subplot. This also helps to amplify his pansexuality and androgynous nature, which varies dependent on the plot situation and persona he has adopted. Aside from catalyzing the plot or subplot with his various personas, and despite his increasingly evident self-interest, he often serves to counsel the show's main characters, by humorously affirming or bluntly disregarding their opinions.

On July 10, 2015, at Comic Con, Justin Roiland, the creator of Rick and Morty (2013–Present), described the character Rick Sanchez as pansexual while voice actor Ryan Ridley described Rick as "gay". His pansexuality was criticized by Nerdist as translating to nothing more than a "planet-wide orgy", a leap from "anything viewers are expected to digest as sincere", and an indication that pop culture is not taking pansexuality seriously while using stereotypes. His character was further criticized for thriving on "traditional masculinity" like Lando Calrissian and Wade Wilson of Deadpool.

In July 2018, Caroline Cao of IndieWire asserted that Rose Quartz, in Steven Universe (2013-2019) and Steven Universe Future (2019-2020), was coded as pansexual because she "experiments with romances with Pearl and human men and women alike."

In August 2019, in response to a fan, Ian Jones-Quartey, creator of OK K.O.! Let's Be Heroes (2017-2019), an all-ages animation, confirmed Lord Boxman, the founder and CEO of Boxmore, who is obsessed with destroying the plaza and a villain of the series, as pansexual. It was later confirmed that Boxman had feelings for his former loving partner in the past, Professor Venomous. On October 13, 2020, Jones-Quartey said that Venomous and Boxman were married at the end of the series.

On October 6, 2019, the Season 3 episode of Big Mouth (2017–Present), "Rankings", aired on Netflix. It introduced a new character at Bridgeton Middle School, Ali, who is openly pansexual. However, Ali's explanation of her pansexuality, as compared to bisexuality, was criticzed by various LGBTQ people on social media as not understanding the differences between pansexuality and bisexuality, engaging in negative stereotypes in the process. On October 8, the co-creator of Big Mouth, Andrew Goldberg, apologized on behalf himself and the other creators of the show (Nick Kroll, Jennifer Flackett, and Mark Levin), on Twitter, saying they missed the mark, saying it is challenging and that they "could have done better". He also thanked the "trans, pan, and bi communities" for opening their eyes about these issues, adding they are listening, looking "forward to delving into all of this in future seasons." This statement was praised by Bustle as a step "in the right direction". In later episodes, Ali begins dating a quiet female student named Samira.

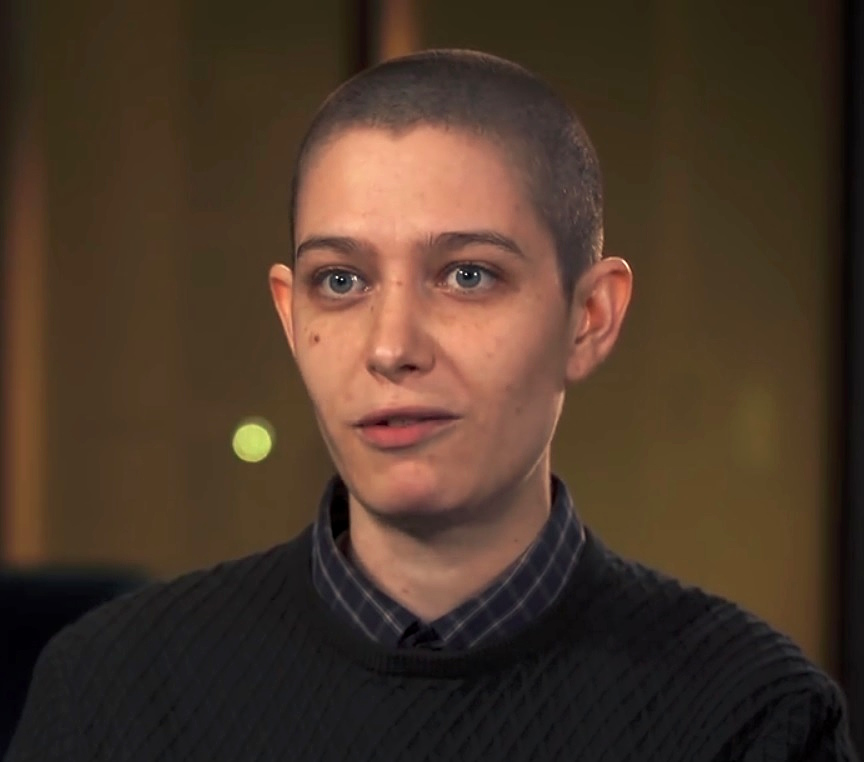
American non-binary gender actor Asia Kate Dillon in January 2017

On the November 25, 2021 episode of gen:LOCK, Val/entina Romanyszyn is revealed to be pansexual. Val is also genderfluid, going by the name "Val" when male-presenting and "Valentina" when female-presenting. Romanyszyn is voiced by Asia Kate Dillon, who is a pansexual and non-binary actor, and the character was written as genderfluid, but is feminine-presenting, altering their gender performance several times. In September 2017, when accepting a Human Rights Campaign Visibility Award, Dillon openly discussed their non-binary identity, stating that they were grateful to be the first non-binary actor to "play a non-binary identified character on a major television show" and noted that they are "out as non-binary, trans, and pansexual."

== Film ==
In November 2015, Tim Miller, director of Deadpool (2016), said that Wade Wilson was pansexual. However, this is never explicitly portrayed on-screen, with the character's interest in men being used as the source of humor. Megan Townsend of GLAAD criticized the representation, noting that most of the film's references to this "are in service of proving how outrageous his character is." In 2013, a Deadpool writer, Gerry Duggan, said that Deadpool was attracted to "anything with a pulse" while in 2015, Gail Simone, another writer for the films, tweeted that she "always thought of Deadpool as pansexual." This prompted one fan to write an essay about it, sending it to the creator of Deadpool, Fabian Nicieza, who said that Deadpool was created to be fluid, in general, conflating "sexuality and sex", bemoaning questions about the sexuality of Deadpool. S.E. Fleenor of Syfy argued that in the comics Deadpool engages "in pansexual attraction" toward Wolverine, Spider-Man, and Thor, even though he only has "sexual relationships... in the comics...[and] films... [with] women" or people who present as women. (Note: Fleenor also says that Deadpool is pansexual "even if he never, ever has an on-the-page or on-screen relationship with a man," while saying that "Deadpool may not be the pansexual icon we want, but maybe he's the one we deserve.") Deadpool's gender identity was also reflected in the comics.

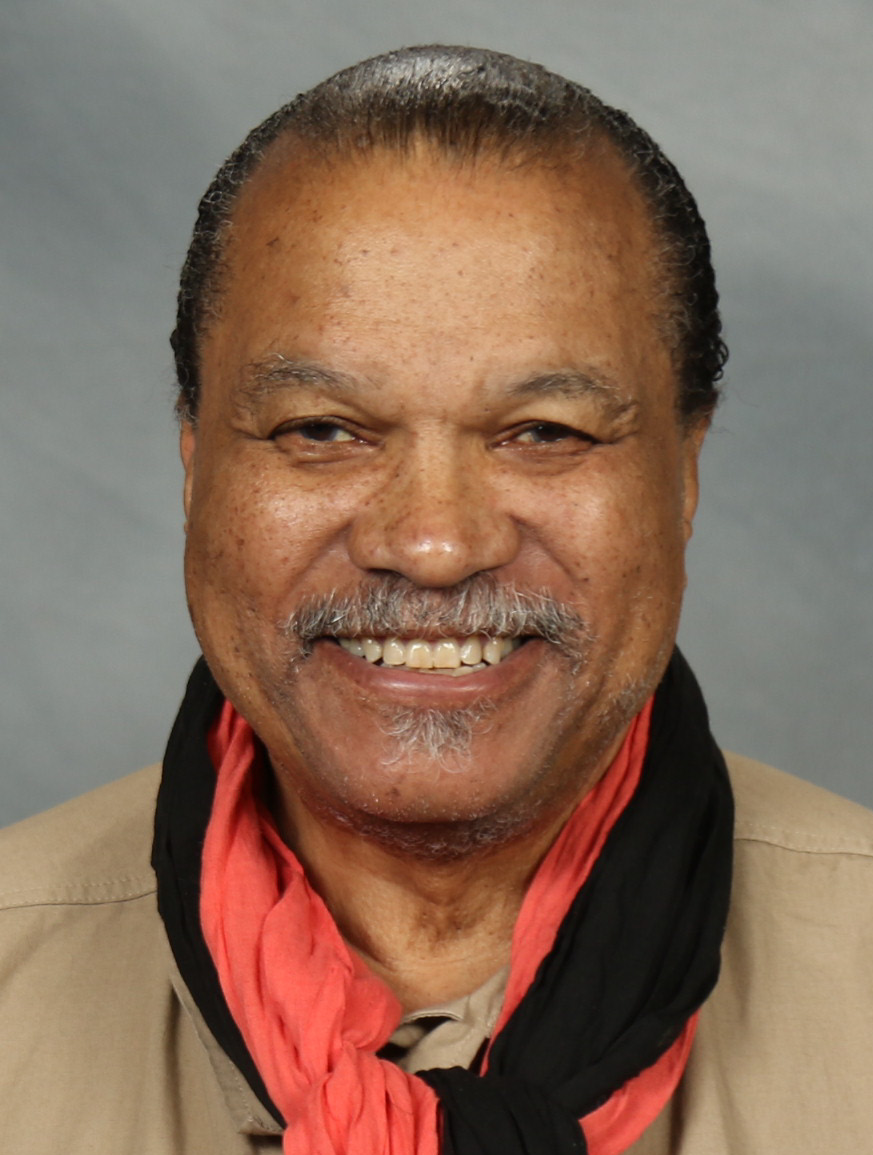
Billy Dee Williams at Paradise City Comic Con, December 2016; Williams portrayed Lando Calrissian in the Star Wars films The Empire Strikes Back and Return of the Jedi (1983)

In May 2018, one of the co-writers of Solo: A Star Wars Story, Jonathan Kasdan, stated that Lando Calrissian, who appeared in the film and other Star Wars films, (Note: The Empire Strikes Back (1980), Return of the Jedi (1983), and Star Wars: The Rise of Skywalker (2019)) was pansexual, adding that there is a "fluidity to Donald and Billy Dee's [portrayal of Lando's] sexuality," while admitting that he would have liked to get a "more explicitly LGBT character into this movie." He further said that Lando "doesn't make any hard and fast rules" when it comes to his sexual attractions. Some took this to be a "deeply regressive" move by suggesting this to fans without delivering on it, a "piss-poor shot at representation" which reinforces stereotypes, while others said that the fact that Lando "could be pansexual is more than just groundbreaking for mainstream sci-fi films." Donald Glover (who voiced Lando in the films Solo and The Rise of Skywalker) supported Kasdan's interpretation, describing Lando as a character who "doesn't have hard and fast boundaries about everything" when it comes to sexual attraction. Others stated that Lando's pansexuality is never seen on screen.

On February 15, 2020, the romantic comedy television film The Thing About Harry premiered on Hulu and Freeform. In one scene, Sam learns that his former school enemy and new love interest, Harry, is pansexual. The director of the film, Peter Paige told Variety that he loves the "notion of pansexuality not being about male or female but about 'I am looking for the soul that speaks to me no matter what body it comes in'" and thought that this was lovely enough that he "instantly reevaluate[d] the character of Harry." He also said that this the way the Millennial generation "talks about sexuality" is new and opened up "the landscape of the storytelling." Ty Gamble-Eddington, a GLAAD Campus Ambassador, positively reviewed the film, saying it is "all too rare to see a character who is pansexual" in television and film, especially having a character who uses the word, "pansexual". Gamble-Eddington also noted the film discusses "the experience of fluidity" that people have when they "as they grow into their identity" and praised Harry's character for breaking the "stereotypical characterization of queer men in media."

== Live-action television ==
In August 2008, Alan Ball told GLAAD that his new series True Blood would have "pansexual vampires" because, in his mind, for vampires "feeding and sexuality are combined." The series was renewed in September 2008.

On June 24, 2011, the creator of Torchwood, Russell T. Davies, said that he considered the time-traveling captain, Jack Harkness, in Doctor Who and Torchwood "omnisexual and not just gay" and added that the character was not "calmed down, or censored, or compromised in any way." Harkness is said to flirt "with anything that moved" as he has relationships with women, men, and non-humans.

On March 17, 2014, Sophia, in the fifth episode of Star-Crossed, came out as a "pansexual alien gal" who has a huge crush on a human girl. Her voice actor, Brina Palencia confirmed this on a tweet the following day.

In a March 2015 Season 1 episode, "Honeymoon", of Schitt's Creek, David Rose came out as pansexual. Daniel Levy, who plays the character, called it a "special thing" and said that for some people his character is a point of entry toward understanding homosexuality and pansexuality. His character has relationships with a woman named Stevie Budd (Note: Her actor, Emily Hampshire, as pansexual.) and a man named Patrick "Pat" Brewer, the latter who becomes his fiance. The show was later nominated for a GLAAD Media Award. While Sarah Kate Ellis, the president and CEO of GLAAD, praised the show for "expanding representation of the spectrum of idenities within the LGBTQ community," saying that other creators should model this, others criticized the show for making a misstep when it came to pansexuality, like Big Mouth in describing a trans man, adding that "pop culture still has a way to go when it comes to properly representing gender identity."

One review in Flare noted that Rose joined, in January 2016, pansexual characters in Game of Thrones, Penny Dreadful, Halt and Catch Fire, Transparent, Orange Is the New Black, House of Cards, Teen Wolf, Scream Queens, Broad City, How to Get Away with Murder, American Horror Story: Hotel, Sense8, and Other Space, calling it "about time" that pansexual characters get a turn to tell their stories, with pansexuality "treated as merely part of somebody's story, not the story." Articles in NewNowNext, The Independent, and on GLAAD's blog confirmed this assessment.

In June 2015, YouTube personality and television personality, Jazz Jennings, known for the reality show I Am Jazz (2015–Present) came out as pansexual. She defined the word as meaning that "you are attracted to anyone, no matter their sex, sexual orientation, gender, gender identity, everything," saying that sometimes she is attracted to girls and other times she is attracted to boys and would date anyone. She later won GLAAD Media Awards for the show I Am Jazz. She later asserted her pansexuality in a January 2018 tweet, saying her pansexuality means she is "attracted to people at a level that surpasses gender identity or sexual orientation."

In August 2017, Molly Bernard who portrays Lauren in the comedy-drama, Younger, said that her character is "a fluid, pansexual female" who identifies as a woman, but is "not straight and...not gay," meaning she is genderfluid instead, with no preference for male or female partners. When asked about bisexuals and pansexuals in TV, Bernard argued that visibility "is exceedingly important" and praised her character as being a "role model for folks" while calling her character a "full, driven, fucking strong woman" and praising the show as "empowering." However, her pansexuality is not explicitly stated in the show.

The first season of Spike Lee's She's Gotta Have It on Netflix in November 2017 starred Nola Darling as a "pansexual, polyamorous woman living in Brooklyn." The show's second, and last season, had Nola beginning a new relationship with a single mom named Opal.

In October 2018, GLAAD praised Legacies (on The CW) and Chilling Adventures of Sabrina (on Netflix) which both featured pansexual characters: Jozie and Ambrose. The voice actor of Ambrose, Chance Perdomo, later confirmed that Ambrose is pansexual and an "ethnic minority" but does not make a "big fuss about it" in the show, but integrate it into his character, his relationships, and the story itself. Gizmodo later described that this comes across onscreen through "flirtation, sexual activity, and his relationships" and was part of the promotion of the show by Netflix, with Adeline Rudolph, voicing Agatha in the show, even proposing that "all witches and warlocks" in the show are pansexual. This was criticized by Gizmodo as the show doing a "poor job" of showing this to be the case.

In September 2019, Megan Townsend of GLAAD wrote that Callie Torres of Grey's Anatomy, who "remains cited as the longest running LGBTQ character on television," opened the doors for a "wave of outstanding bi and pansexual characters who came after her."

== Video games ==
In November 2014, the game Dragon Age: Inquisition premiered. It included Iron Bull, a pansexual man who would "happily sleep with all genders and races" and has various romance scenes in the game. In January 2015, the game was honored by GLAAD with an award for special recognition for LGBT characters like Iron Bull and Josephine, the latter who is bisexual.

In February 2017, Night in the Woods premiered. In the game, Mae identifies as pansexual, even though there are not any "romantic moments" involving her in the series, unlike other characters.

From September 2018 to December 2019, episodic graphic adventure game Life Is Strange 2 was released. One of the characters, Finn, was confirmed as pansexual in one of the storylines.

In January 2021, it was revealed that Jack from the game Mass Effect 2 was meant to be pansexual but objections from Fox News and other media outlets caused them to change their minds. Some noted that her dialogue stated this, with former BioWare writer Brian Kindregan stating that she was "essentially pansexual for most of the development of that romance."

== Music ==
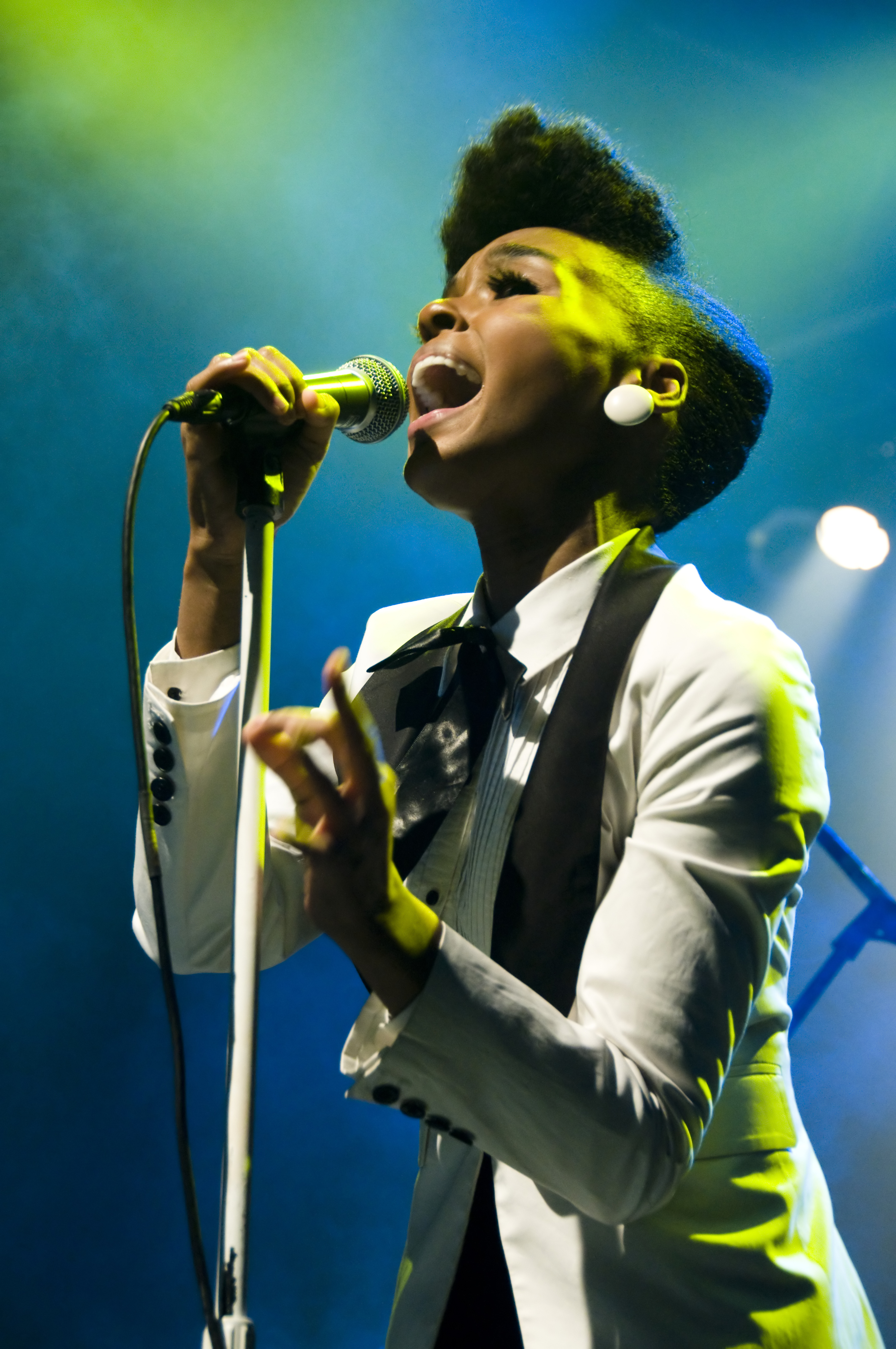
Janelle Monáe performing at the Austin Music Hall during SXSW, March 2009

There are various pansexual musicians. This includes American singer-songwriter Janelle Monáe, American pop singer Miley Cyrus, and Brendon Urie, frontman for the music project, Panic! at the Disco.

In August 2012, the rapper Angel Haze said that "love is boundary-less" and that he would be with anyone who would make him laugh. She clarified in November 2013 that to be pansexual, in her words, means to "want love" and to have "a connection with anyone you can find it with." She later said that she is "whatever I am when I am it" when asked if she was gay and may have dated Ireland Baldwin in the past. In January 2015, she was later nominated for a GLAAD Media Award in the Outstanding Music Artist category for her record, Dirty Gold.

In May 2015, Miley Cyrus said, in an Instagram post, that nothing would define her, that she is "Free to be EVERYTHING!!!!" In October 2015, she came out as pansexual but said that she is "not in a relationship" despite the fact she occasionally goes on dates. In October 2016, Cyrus said that she does not "relate to what people would say defines a girl or a boy."

In April 2018, Monáe described herself as "a free-ass motherfucker" who initially identified as bisexual but identified more with pansexuality. Her album, Dirty Computer was later nominated for a GLAAD Media Award. Some said that Monáe coming out as pansexual was huge, giving them a "role model" to look up to, saying she helped "launch pansexual representation to new heights."

Some reviewers pointed to other pansexual singers like Bella Thorne, Demi Lovato (who identifies as "sexually fluid"), Cara Delevingne, Christine and the Queens, Brooke Candy, Amandla Stenberg, and Courtney Act.

== Literature ==
In 2017, former librarian Kelly Jensen mentioned Riley Redgate's Seven Ways We Lie (2016), Becky Albertalli's The Upside of Unrequited (2017), and Brandy Colbert's Little & Lion (2017) as examples of young adult fiction with outwardly pansexual characters.

In 2020, reference librarian Elliott Riley, talked about books with pansexual protagonists, hoping that more books with pansexual protagonists "will be published in the future." This includes books by M. Hollis' The Melody of You and Me (2017), Mina Waheed's Soft on Soft (2018), Riley Redgate's Final Draft (2018), Britta Lundin's Ship It (2018), and Anna Zabo's Reverb (2019).

== Comics ==
In 1962, Loki Laufeyson first appeared and was later confirmed to be pansexual.

== See also ==
- List of pansexual people
- List of animated series with LGBTQ characters
- List of fictional polyamorous characters
- List of fictional non-binary characters
- List of fictional lesbian characters
- List of fictional asexual characters
- List of fictional intersex characters
- List of fictional trans characters
- List of fictional bisexual characters
- List of fictional gay characters
- List of comedy television series with LGBT characters
- List of dramatic television series with LGBT characters: 1970s–2000s
- List of dramatic television series with LGBT characters: 2010s
- List of made-for-television films with LGBT characters
- List of LGBT characters in soap operas
- List of LGBT characters in radio and podcasts
