= Gay characters in fiction =

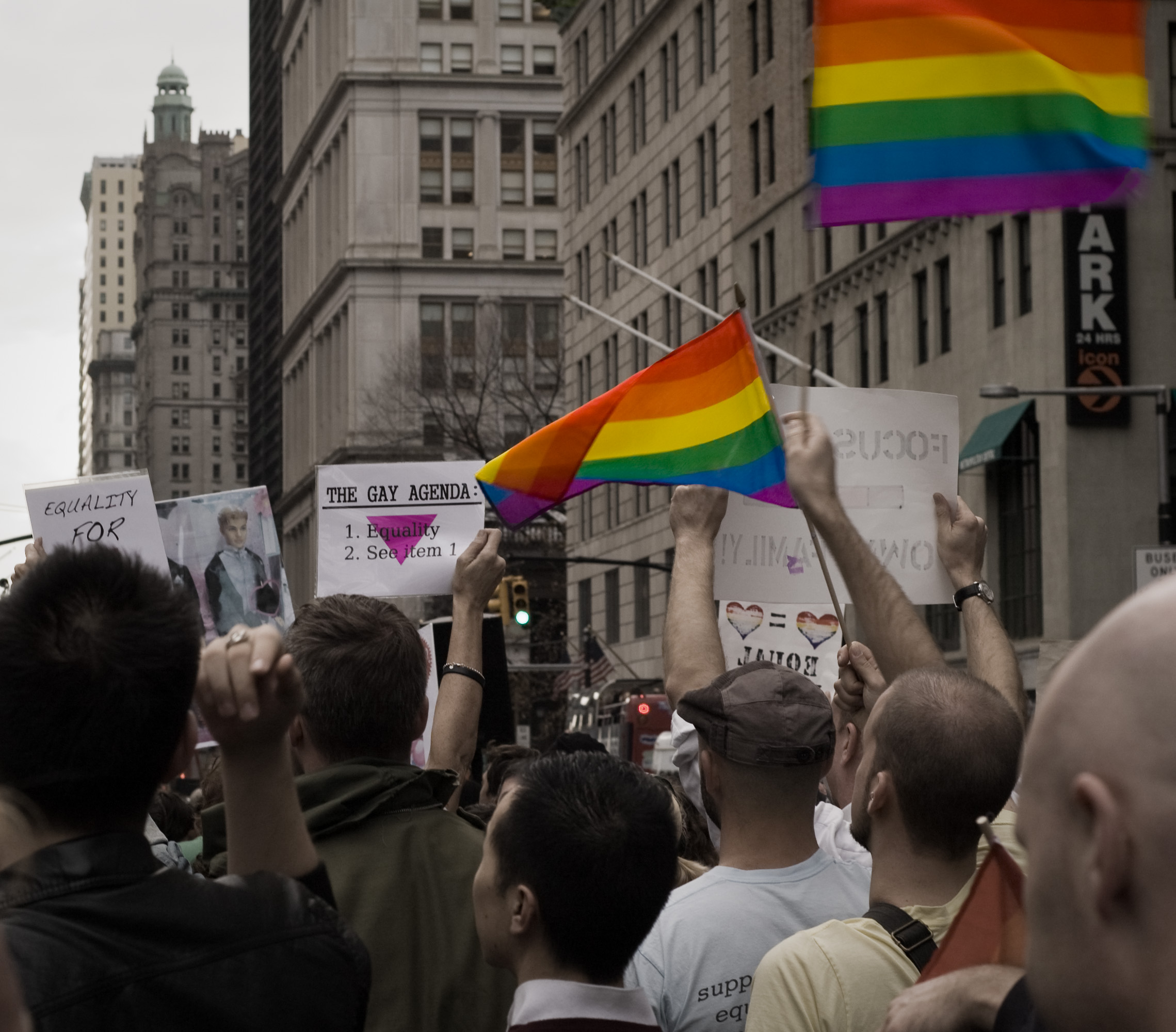
People at the 2008 gay marriage rally, including a protester whose sign says "THE GAY AGENDA: 1. Equality 2. See Item 1"

Gay is a term that primarily refers to a homosexual person or the trait of being homosexual. The term's use as a reference to male homosexuality may date as early as the late 19th century, but its use gradually increased in the mid-20th century. In modern English, gay has come to be used as an adjective, and as a noun, referring to the community, practices and cultures associated with homosexuality. In the 1960s, gay became the word favored by homosexual men to describe their sexual orientation. By the end of the 20th century, the word gay was recommended by major LGBT groups and style guides to describe people attracted to members of the same sex, although it is more commonly used to refer specifically to men. At about the same time, a new, pejorative use became prevalent in some parts of the world. Among younger speakers, the word has a meaning ranging from derision (e.g., equivalent to rubbish or stupid) to a light-hearted mockery or ridicule (e.g., equivalent to weak, unmanly, or lame). The extent to which these usages still retain connotations of homosexuality has been debated and harshly criticized. This page examines gay characters in fictional works as a whole, focusing on characters and tropes in cinema and fantasy.

For more information about fictional characters in other parts of the LGBTQ community, see the corresponding pages about pansexual, and non-binary and intersex characters in fiction.

== Gay characters and tropes ==
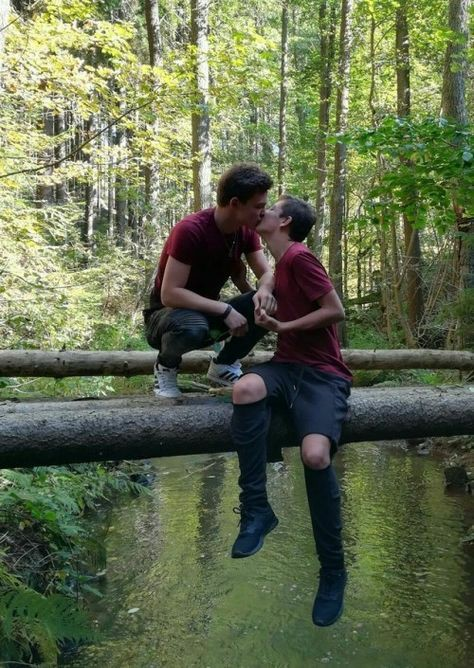
Two men kissing, celebrating Pride on a tree in June 2019

In U.S. television and other media, gay or lesbian characters tend to die or meet another unhappy ending, such as becoming insane, more often than other characters. Fans call this trope "bury your gays" or more specifically "dead lesbian syndrome". Increasing awareness and criticism of the trope has made creators attempt to avoid it. In 2018, Star Trek: Discovery aired an episode in which a gay character played by Wilson Cruz was killed. Immediately after the episode aired, Cruz, GLAAD, and the showrunners released reassuring statements intimating that the character's death may not be final, with specific reference to avoiding this trope. Indeed, in the following season, Cruz's character returned from the dead by science-fictional means, and Cruz was added to the main cast. But efforts to avoid the trope may also limit the range of stories that are told about queer characters: When the final season of She-Ra and the Princesses of Power premiered in 2020, showrunner ND Stevenson said that they couldn't "see another gay character die on TV for the moment. Maybe one day we can have a tragic gay romance again, but that has been, like, the only norm for so long."

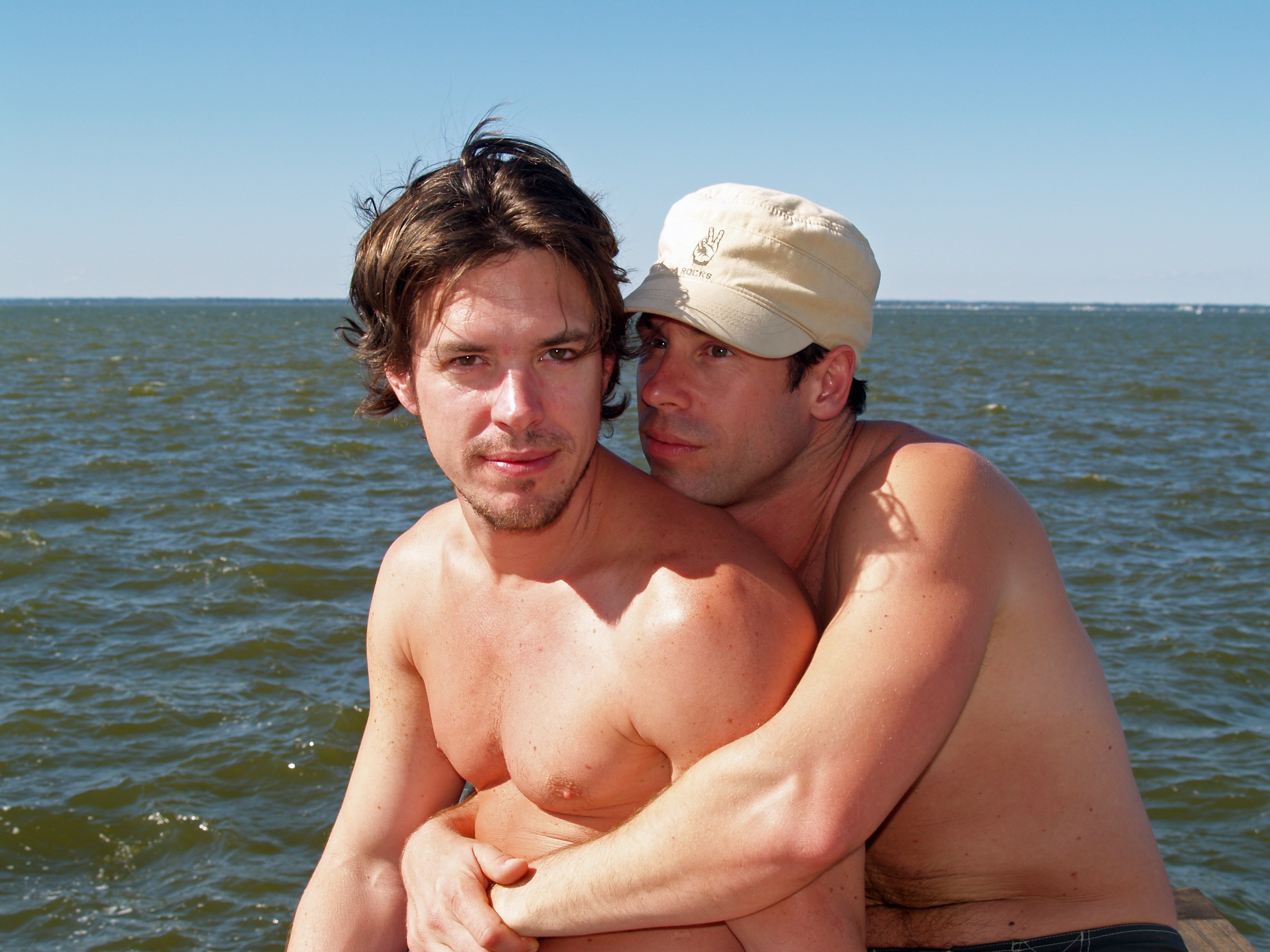
Paul Dawson and PJ DeBoy

Apart from this, in many forms of popular entertainment, gay men are portrayed stereotypically as promiscuous, flashy, flamboyant, and bold, while the reverse is often true of how lesbians are portrayed. Media representations of bisexual and transgender people tend to either completely erase them, or depict them as morally corrupt or mentally unstable. Similar to race-, religion-, and class-based caricatures, these stereotypical stock character representations vilify or make light of marginalized and misunderstood groups. There is currently a widespread view that references to gay people should be omitted from child-related entertainment. When such references do occur they almost invariably generate controversy. In 1997, when American comedian Ellen DeGeneres came out of the closet on her popular sitcom, many sponsors, such as the Wendy's fast-food chain, pulled their advertising. In news, the emergence of more explicit and serious segments of LGBT people began to emerge. In 1967, CBC released a news segment on homosexuality. This segment, however, was a compilation of negative stereotypes of gay men. The 1970s marked an increase in visibility for LGBT communities in media with the 1972 ABC show That Certain Summer. This show was about a gay man raising his family, and although it did not show any explicit relations between the men, it contained no negative stereotypes.

Furthermore, Popular television shows like Will & Grace, Sex and the City, Brothers and Sisters, and Modern Family routinely depict gay men but "most televisual representations" are usually of white men. Having both a queer and black or non-white character is creating multi-faceted "otherness", which is not normally represented on television. Additionally, while many shows depict LGBT people of color, they are often used as a plot device or in some type of trope. Moreover, non-white LGBT characters are often depicted as "race neutral". For example, on the ABC Family show, GRΣΣK, Calvin Owens is openly gay and many of his storylines, struggles, and plots revolve around his self-identification as LGBT. However, while being physically African-American, it is never mentioned in the show, and he is never seen as "explicitly black". Starting with hits like Modern Family, gay homonormativity is becoming a mainstay on broadcast television. There has been a cultural shift from white, gay men being depicted as non-monogamous sex-seekers, stemming from the AIDS epidemic to being "just like everyone else" in their quest to be fathers. Later, the final episode of the animated Disney Channel show Gravity Falls revealed two male cops, Sheriff Blubs and Deputy Durland, as a romantic pair. Additionally, the movie Love, Simon is notable as the first film by a major Hollywood studio to focus on a gay teenage romance.

In 2017, Disney Channel's Andi Mack made history with the depiction of the character Cyrus Goodman (portrayed by Joshua Rush), making him Disney Channel's first-ever character to come out as gay. On February 9, 2019, Andi Mack yet again made television history when Cyrus came out to his male best friend, Jonah Beck (Asher Angel), saying "I'm gay", making him the first Disney character to ever use the word "gay" in its modern meaning. Cyrus developed mutual feelings for the captain of the basketball team, TJ Kippen (portrayed by Luke Mullen) and in the series finale, these feelings were made apparent and the two held hands, marking the start of the first romance between two male characters and the first gay romance involving a main character in Disney history.

First premiering on Crave on the 28th of November, 2025, Heated Rivalry, a Canadian TV show based on the book of the same name by Rachel Reid and directed and written by Jacob Tierney, featured two concurrent story-lines in its first series. One was of Shane Hollander (Hudson Williams) and Ilya Rozanov (Connor Storrie), two professional ice hockey players seeking to both further their fruitful sporting careers by hiding their queer identities while growing and exploring the nature of their relationship and sexualities, and the other of Scott Hunter (François Arnaud) and Kip Grady (Robbie G.K.), the former a professional hockey player and the latter a smoothie shop worker, meeting at Kip's workplace and developing a private romance, turned public later in the series. The show explores the pressures of being homosexual in conservative sport industries, and the struggles of exploring one's identity and relationships in the public eye, particularly through a queer lens. It has been praised for its pioneering and stark representation of queer self-discovery in sport through youth and beyond, and for exploring the joy that queerness can bring, while putting this in the context of a heteronormative society.

== Prominent examples ==
There are many gay characters who have prominently appeared in media other than those previously listed in this article, including in literature, teen fiction, yaoi stories, slash fiction, bara manga, pulp fiction, along with in animated series, webcomics, and other media. This included Jack Twist and Ennis del Mar in the short story, Brokeback Mountain, where Jack and Ennis have a long term sexual and romantic relationship despite both being married to women and fathering children. There was also Oshima in Kafka on the Shore. Oshima is a 21-year-old intellectual gay trans man who is a librarian and owner of a cabin in the mountains near Komura Memorial Library. He becomes the mentor of Kafka as he guides him to the answers that he's seeking on his journey. On a similar note, webcomics like Kyle's Bed & Breakfast, Homestuck, Check, Please!, and Lumberjanes all included gay characters. Specifically, in Kyle's Bed & Breakfast, there are various LGBT characters, such as Jeff Olsen, a gay man with HIV, Mark Masterson, a gay scholar, and Kristian Janson, a Jamaican gay man, while in Homestuck, Dirk Strider states he is only attracted to guys. Furthermore, Check, Please! centers around a gay protagonist on a college hockey team and Jo, a trans woman of color and an "expert on what it means to be a Lumberjane" to the fellow campers, has two dads. Similarly, tomboy Charlotte "Charlie" in Lee Knox Ostertag's Witch Boy series has two dads who appear in all three graphic novels as recurring characters (Note: One or both of Charlie's Dads are also featured on pages 32, 33, and 34 of The Hidden Witch as Aster has dinner with them, and later on pages 92, 125, 127, 129, and 137. Also, they appear either individually, or together, on pages 18, 19, 20, 21, 39, 58, and 59 of The Midwinter Witch.) and are the only explicitly LGBTQ characters shown in the graphic novels

Video games and graphic novels also feature various gay characters. For instance, Saied in the 1989 game, Circuit's Edge, a gay man, is alleged to be the former lover of Yasmin, a trans woman, while Damien Bloodmarch is a gay trans man in the 2017 game Dream Daddy: A Dad Dating Simulator. Graphic novels include even more characters. Northstar in Uncanny X-Men, first appearing in Uncanny X-Men #120 (1979), was the first openly gay superhero in the Marvel Comics universe. Additionally, Andy Lippincott in Doonsbury, who first appeared in 1976, was the first openly gay character to appear in a mainstream comic strip. Other than these two characters Midnighter and Apollo, who appeared in the Midnighter comic book series, from 2006 to 2008 and 2015 to 2016 respectfully. Midnighter is one of DC Comics' most prominent gay superheroes and his relationship with Apollo is one of the most prominent gay relationships in DC Comics.

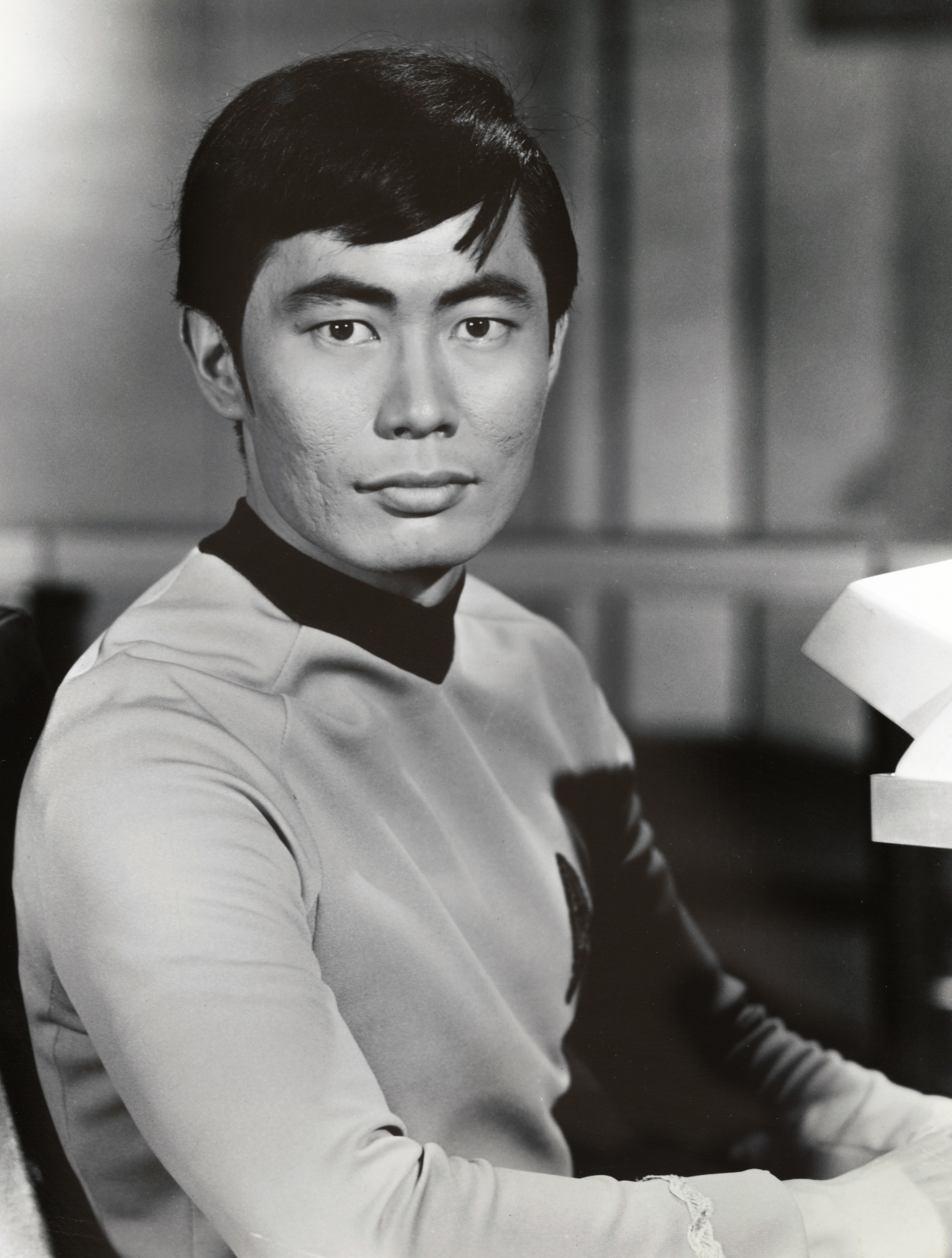
Photo of George Takei as Sulu from the television program Star Trek

Film and live-action television had their share of characters as well. In the novel upon which the 1941 film, The Maltese Falcon, is based, Joel Cairo is referred to as "queer" and "fairy" but, in the film, his sexuality isn't directly addressed, likely a decision by filmmakers in order to comply with the Hays Code, which banned the depiction of homosexuality in American films. Later, in the 1959 film South, Jan Wicziewsky is a Polish army officer living in exile in the antebellum South, who is torn by his feelings for fellow officer Eric MacClure (Graydon Gould), and the film is believed to be the earliest television film dealing with homosexual themes. There is also Albus Dumbledore in the Harry Potter film series. The films are based on the Harry Potter series of fantasy novels. While Dumbledore's sexuality is not openly portrayed or explicitly mentioned either in the books or the films, J.K. Rowling, the author of the books, revealed that he is gay. At the same time, there is Hikaru Sulu in the films Star Trek, Star Trek Into Darkness, and Star Trek Beyond, who is a gay character, as noted by John Cho who plays him in the 2009 film. However, George Takei, who portrayed him in the original series, said this was "really unfortunate" and claimed that Sulu "had been straight all this time." As for live-action TV series, the Stephen Colbert character in The Colbert Report was gay, confirmed in an episode of The Late Show with Stephen Colbert, as was Blaine Anderson in Glee and a gay couple (Sir and Charles) in A Series of Unfortunate Events.

Gay characters appear in anime and Western animation just as much, if not more, than in other media. In anime, some of the first were an openly gay couple (Zoisite and Kunzite) in Sailor Moon, along with Yukito Tsukishiro and Touya Kinomoto in Cardcaptor Sakura who are a couple, with Yukito rejecting Sakura's feelings because he is in love with Touya. The Dragon Ball franchise, despite having hundreds of characters, has only two confirmed LGBT, General Blue and Otokosuki (a word that in Japanese means "man lover"), and both are loaded with very negative gay male stereotypes. In the 2000s, Bobby Margot in Macross Frontier was the flamboyant helmsman of the Macross Quarter and close friends with Ozma Lee, whom he has unrequited feelings for and Yusuko Ono in Antique Bakery is often out of job because "he is irresistible to men," leading coworkers to fight for his affection. In later years, Nathan Seymour / Fire Emblem appeared in Tiger & Bunny. Nathan is a highly effeminate homosexual man who identifies as genderqueer though he prefers to be identified as a woman at times, often spending more time with the female heroes while flirting with the male heroes. (Note: YouTube vlogger, Miles Jai Daron Wilson, who produces LGBTQ content, has said that Nathan Seymour is "the only time I have LITERALLY seen myself in an anime...with the exception of being a hero with pyrokinesis of course.") In the past, they tried to present themselves femininely but was harshly criticized, and they still hold a strong romantic infatuation towards men. They also run their own successful company, Helios Energy, and have been described as a "confident canonically agender queer POC."

In Western animation, gay characters were not always as prominent, with some closeted or not revealed until years later. For instance, Waylon Smithers of The Simpsons, for much of the show's run, was a semi-closeted gay man, not coming out, officially, as gay until the 2016 episode "The Burns Cage." In the 1990s, South Park featured Big Gay Al, a stereotypical homosexual man known for his flamboyant and positive demeanor introduced in the episode "Big Gay Al's Big Gay Boat Ride". Big Gay Al openly displays his homosexuality and is an advocate for gay rights. He is Mr. Garrison's ex-boyfriend, and is married to Mr. Slave as shown in the episode "Follow That Egg!" Other than Big Gay Al, the British series Crapston Villas was one of the first animated series on British television to present openly gay characters. In later years, shows such as Queer Duck prominently featured gay characters like Adam Seymour Duckstein and Steven Arlo Gator, while Rick & Steve: The Happiest Gay Couple in All the World had two gay couples: Rick Brocka and Steve Ball, Chuck Masters and Evan Martinez, In the 2016, Howard and Harold McBride in The Loud House became the first pair of married male characters to be depicted on a Nickelodeon series. Then, in 2019, the Hulu original series, The Bravest Knight became one of the first all-ages animations to have an "openly gay main character." The series later won the MIPCOM Diversify TV Excellence award in kids' programming at the MIPCOM Diversify TV Excellence awards in October 2019. The same year, Nigel Ratburn and another man, Patrick, get married in the season 22 premiere of Arthur, which aired on May 13, 2019. As a result, he and his husband are the first LGBT characters in the series. In 2020, the series Kipo and the Age of Wonderbeasts featured Benson and Troy as a gay couple, with Benson as one of the first characters to say the words "I'm gay" in an animated series.

== See also ==
- Gay village
- Gay bashing
- List of fictional gay characters
- List of lesbian, gay, bisexual or transgender-related films
- LGBT themes in comics
- List of animated series with LGBTQ characters
- LGBTQ themes in Western animation
- LGBTQ themes in anime and manga
