= List of fictional pansexual characters =

This is a list of pansexual characters in fiction, i.e. characters that identify as pansexual or are identified by outside parties to be pansexual. Pansexuality is the sexual, romantic or emotional attraction towards people regardless of their biological sex or gender identity. While pansexuality is at times viewed as a sexual orientation in its own right, at other times it's viewed as a branch of bisexuality, to indicate an alternative sexual identity.

The pansexual pride flag.

This list contains characters across various forms of media that are pansexual, listed in alphabetical order by surname in each section. In the case where characters are identified with only a single name (either first or last) or by a title, that is used instead. To be listed here, characters have to either state in-universe that they are pansexual or be identified as such by either someone involved in the work they appear in or a reliable, third-party source.

The names are organized alphabetically by surname (i.e. last name), or by single name if the character does not have a surname.

== Animated series ==
Character	Title	Duration	Actor	Notes	Ref.
Ali	Big Mouth	2019–2025	Ali Wong	She is openly pansexual, although her explanation of her pansexuality, as compared to bisexuality, was criticized by various LGBTQ people on social media. In later episodes, Ali begins dating a quiet female student named Samira and later becomes a potential love interest for Jessi Glaser.	
Ally	Amphibia	2019–2022	Melissa Villaseñor	Ally is in a same-sex relationship with Jess, running an internet video channel named "IT Gals" with her. The pair describe themselves in the text of their video descriptions as "just two girlfriends", qualified with an LGBT pride flag emoji. After the characters' debut, lead color designer Andy Garner-Flexner stated that Ally's color palette was based on the pansexual pride flag.	
Asmodeus	Helluva Boss	2019–present	James Monroe Iglehart	Asmodeus is the Sin of Lust and is in a romantic relationship with Fizzarolli. Official art posted for Pride Month in 2024 depicted him with the colors of the pansexual pride flag.	
Barbie Wire	Helluva Boss	2019–present	Jinhee Joung	Barbie Wire is Blitzo's twin sister. In the short "Barbie's Bad Day", she is shown to have a girlfriend, Kendra. Official art posted for Pride Month in 2024 depicted her with the colors of the pansexual pride flag.	
Beelzebub	Helluva Boss	2019–present	Kesha	Beelzebub is the Sin of Gluttony and is in a romantic relationship with the hellhound Vortex. Official art posted for Pride Month in 2024 depicted her with the colors of the pansexual pride flag.	
Blitzo	Helluva Boss	2019–present	Brandon Rogers	Blitzo has an on-and-off sexual relationship with Stolas, a royal demon of Hell.	
Lord Boxman	OK K.O.! Let's Be Heroes	2017–2019	Jim Cummings	Boxman has feelings for Professor Venomous, who was his loving partner in the past. On October 13, 2020, Ian Jones-Quartey confirmed that Professor Venomous and Lord Boxman were married at the end of the series.	
Chaz	Helluva Boss	2019–present	Eric Schwartz	Chaz is Moxxie and Millie's ex. Official art posted for Pride Month in 2024 depicted him with the colors of the pansexual pride flag.	
Husk	Hazbin Hotel	2019	Mick Lauer	Husk is the bartender at the Hazbin Hotel. Official merchandise released for Pride Month in 2025 depicted him with the pansexual pride flag.	
Husk	Hazbin Hotel	2024–present	Keith David	Husk is the bartender at the Hazbin Hotel. Official merchandise released for Pride Month in 2025 depicted him with the pansexual pride flag.	
Verosika Mayday	Helluva Boss	2019–present	Cristina Vee	Verosika is a succubus pop star and Blitzo's ex-girlfriend. Official art posted for Pride Month in 2024 depicted her with the colors of the pansexual pride flag.	
Lucifer Morningstar	Hazbin Hotel	2024–present	Jeremy Jordan	Lucifer is the king of Hell and the father of the show's protagonist, Charlie Morningstar. Official merchandise released for Pride Month in 2025 depicted him with the pansexual pride flag.	
Rose Quartz	Steven Universe	2013–2019	Susan Egan	Rose had a complicated romantic relationship with Pearl, and later with Greg Universe, the father of the show's protagonist, Steven Universe, along with various other men in short-term relationships. In the episode "Mr. Greg," Greg and Pearl recognize that they both loved Rose, who loved them both back.	
Rose Quartz	Steven Universe Future	2019–2020	Susan Egan	Rose had a complicated romantic relationship with Pearl, and later with Greg Universe, the father of the show's protagonist, Steven Universe, along with various other men in short-term relationships. In the episode "Mr. Greg," Greg and Pearl recognize that they both loved Rose, who loved them both back.	
Roger	American Dad!	2005–present	Seth MacFarlane	He shows interest in both men and women and most commonly refers to his sexuality as omnisexual. He also uses other labels. Particularly, in the episode "You Debt Your Life", he describes himself as a "fey pansexual alcoholic non-human". He is a very zany alien who lives in the Smith family's attic, who is shown to assume hundreds of different aliases, male and female.	
Val/entina Romanyszyn	Gen:Lock	2019–2021	Asia Kate Dillon	Val/entina Romanyszyn is revealed to be pansexual in the episode "Together. Together." Val is also genderfluid, going by the name "Val" when male-presenting and "Valentina" when female-presenting. Romanyszyn is voiced by Asia Kate Dillon, who is a pansexual and non-binary actor, and the character was written as genderfluid and feminine-presenting, altering their gender performance several times.	
Valentino	Hazbin Hotel	2019, 2024–present	Joel Perez	Valentino is a porn studio owner and Angel Dust's abusive boss. He is in a relationship with Vox. Official merchandise released for Pride Month in 2025 depicted him with the pansexual pride flag.	

== Film ==
Character	Title	Year	Actor	Notes	Ref.
Lando Calrissian	The Empire Strikes Back	1980	Billy Dee Williams	Lando, a gambler, con artist, playboy, mining engineer, and businessman who administered Cloud City, was confirmed as pansexual, and having fluidity in his sexuality, by a co-writer of Solo, Jonathan Kasdan. Some took this to be a "deeply regressive" move by suggesting this to fans without delivering on it, even as Donald Glover supported the interpretation. Other fans pointed out possible flirting between Han and Lando, shipping them since the 1980s, with shipping expanding in the 1990s. Glover also described Lando as a character who "doesn't have hard and fast boundaries about everything" when it comes to sexual attraction.	
Lando Calrissian	Return of the Jedi	1983	Billy Dee Williams		
Lando Calrissian	Solo: A Star Wars Story	2018	Donald Glover		
Lando Calrissian	Star Wars: The Rise of Skywalker	2019	Billy Dee Williams		
Mal	Descendants	2015	Dove Cameron	Mal is the daughter of the Disney villain Maleficent. She falls in love with a male character named Ben. She also appears in a Chibiverse short commemorating pride month. According to her actress Dove Cameron, Mal is pansexual.	
Mal	Descendants 2	2017	Dove Cameron	Mal is the daughter of the Disney villain Maleficent. She falls in love with a male character named Ben. She also appears in a Chibiverse short commemorating pride month. According to her actress Dove Cameron, Mal is pansexual.	
Mal	Descendants 3	2019	Dove Cameron	Mal is the daughter of the Disney villain Maleficent. She falls in love with a male character named Ben. She also appears in a Chibiverse short commemorating pride month. According to her actress Dove Cameron, Mal is pansexual.	
Harry Turpin	The Thing About Harry	2020	Niko Terho	Turpin is the former high school bully of Sam who becomes friends and falls in love with him after revealing he's now identified as pansexual.	
Wade Wilson / Deadpool	Deadpool	2016	Ryan Reynolds	While Tim Miller, director of the first film, described Deadpool as pansexual, this is never explicitly portrayed on-screen. As with the first film, Deadpool 2 (2018) also does not explicitly portray his sexuality, with the character's interest in men being used as a source of humor.	
Wade Wilson / Deadpool	Deadpool 2	2018	Ryan Reynolds	While Tim Miller, director of the first film, described Deadpool as pansexual, this is never explicitly portrayed on-screen. As with the first film, Deadpool 2 (2018) also does not explicitly portray his sexuality, with the character's interest in men being used as a source of humor.	
Karen Shetty (Note: Known as Karen Smith in the original film.)	Mean Girls	2024	Avantika Vandanapu	Karen's actress Avantika Vandanapu has described her character as pansexual.	

== Live-action television ==
Character	Title	Duration	Actor	Notes	Ref.
Kibby Ainsley	Daytime Divas	2017	Chloe Bridges	Ainsley is a former child star and recovering addict, who is one of the co-hosts of the popular daytime television talk show The Lunch Hour.	
Theodore "T-Bag" Bagwell	Prison Break	2005–2009	Robert Knepper	As the leader of a white supremacist group, T-Bag is the most villainous member of the Fox River Eight.	
Harper Bettencourt	iCarly	2021–2023	Laci Mosley	Harper is pansexual and has an "interesting and all over the place" dating life.	
Benedict Bridgerton	Bridgerton	2019–present	Luke Thompson	Benedict, the artistic second son of the Bridgerton family, had relations with both men and women. He eventually married his true love, Sophie. Benedict's actor Luke Thompson described him as pansexual.	
Leslie "Laszlo" Cravensworth	What We Do in the Shadows	2019–2024	Matt Berry	Executive producer, co-showrunner and writer Paul Simms stated "All of our characters are completely pansexual." In the pilot episode, Laszlo discusses his relations with both Nadja and Baron Afanas.	
Dionysus	KAOS	2024	Nabhaan Rizwan	Dionysus, the Greek god of pleasure, wine, and madness, is occasionally seen performing intimate acts with both men and women. In a review of the show, Philadelphia Gay News described him as a pansexual character. In the original mythos, Dionysus had male lovers such as Prosymnus as well as female lovers such as Physcoa.	
Nola Darling	She's Gotta Have It	2017–2019	DeWanda Wise	Darling is described as the "sex-positive, polyamorous, pansexual" artist who takes charge of her life and her body	
Kristina Davis	General Hospital	2002–present	Lexi Ainsworth	Kristina is the daughter of mob kingpin Sonny Corinthos and his former attorney, Alexis Davis.	
Jaskier	The Witcher	2019–present	Joey Batey	"He's canonically queer in the TV show, which is a departure from the books and the games, as far as I know. It was wonderful to see a panromantic or pansexual person in such a flagship show such as this."	
Jadzia Dax	Star Trek: Deep Space Nine	1993–1998	Terry Farrell	Dax's actor Terry Farrell confirmed Dax's pansexuality.	
Franky Fitzgerald	Skins	2011–2012	Dakota Blue Richards	Franky is Alex's best friend. He's described as "not attracted to gender, but rather to the person".	
Adrian Garff	The Mist	2017	Russell Posner	Garff is Alex's best friend.	
Philippa Georgiou (Mirror)	Star Trek: Discovery	2017–2020	Michelle Yeoh	Georgiou is the respected captain of the USS Shenzhou.	
Dorian Gray	Penny Dreadful	2014–2016	Reeve Carney	Gray is a charismatic man who is ageless and immortal.	
Yara Greyjoy	Game of Thrones	2012–2019	Gemma Whelan	Greyjoy is an ironborn and Theon Greyjoy's older sister. She is a claimant to the throne of the Kingdom of the Iron Islands and an ally of Daenerys Targaryen	
The Guide	What We Do in the Shadows	2019-2024	Kristen Schaal	Executive producer, co-showrunner and writer Paul Simms stated "All of our characters are completely pansexual." While attending a wedding, the Guide objects twice–– once because she briefly fell in love with the groom the first time they met, and another time because she briefly fell in love with the bride the first time they met.	
Klaus Hargreeves (Note: Also known as Number Four)	The Umbrella Academy	2019–2024	Robert Sheehan	Sheehan describes his character's onscreen behavior as "very out there and very colourful and unashamed about the fact that he is pansexual, or whatever you want to call it."	
Jack Harkness	Doctor Who & Torchwood	2005–2020	John Barrowman	Harkness is a former "Time Agent" from the 51st century who left the agency after inexplicably losing two years of his memory. He becomes a companion to the Ninth Doctor.	
John Hart	Torchwood	2008	James Marsters	Hart is a rogue Time Agent and former partner of the series' lead male character Jack Harkness (John Barrowman) both professionally and sexually.	
Roscoe Kaan	House of Lies	2012–2016	Donis Leonard Jr.	Donis Jr. is the flamboyant 15-year-old son of Monica and Marty.	
Kareema	No Tomorrow	2016–2017	Sarayu Rao	Kareema is Evie's grumpy and cynical co-worker.	
Carlton Lassiter	Psych	2006–present	Timothy Omundson	Lassiter is a ten-year veteran of the Santa Barbara Police Department, and the youngest Head Detective ever named to the force. He also has a Master's Degree in Criminology. The show's writer confirmed his pansexuality on Twitter.	
Hannibal Lecter	Hannibal	2013–2015	Mads Mikkelsen	The show's creator, Bryan Fuller, states, "From our very first meeting with Mads, he redefined the character immediately for me because he's the devil. He is this thing both of the world and outside of the world. So for me, the devil is pansexual".	
Mal	Descendants: Wicked World	2015–2017	Dove Cameron	Mal is the daughter of the Disney villain Maleficent. She falls in love with a male character named Ben. She also appears in a Chibiverse short commemorating pride month. According to her actress Dove Cameron, Mal is pansexual.	
Oberyn Martell	Game of Thrones	2014	Pedro Pascal	Oberyn is the youngest brother of Doran and Elia Martell, from the desert kingdom of Dorne. He is notorious for both his dangerous and unpredictable nature and his affinity for poisons, for which he earned his nickname.	
Mazikeen	Lucifer	2016–2021	Lesley-Ann Brandt	Mazikeen is the demon confidante and a devoted ally of Lucifer.	
Imogen Moreno	Degrassi: The Next Generation	2011–2015	Cristine Prosperi	After ending her relationship with Eli, Imogen shares a kiss with Fiona and begins a relationship with her, before ending it as well when Fiona graduates and Imogen stays at Degrassi for another year.	
Even Bech Næsheim	Skam	2016–2017	Henrik Holm	Næsheim is the love affair and eventual boyfriend of Isak. Showrunner Julie Andem confirmed Næsheim's pansexuality during Pride Month with an Instagram post on Even's boyfriend Isak's account.	
Nadja of Antipaxos	What We Do in the Shadows	2019–2024	Natasia Demetriou	Executive producer, co-showrunner and writer Paul Simms stated "All of our characters are completely pansexual." Nadja also has an ongoing affair with Gregor, who is repeatedly reincarnated. She pursues him in every lifetime, including those where Gregor is reincarnated as a woman.	
Nandor the Relentless	What We Do in the Shadows	2019–2024	Kayvan Novak	Executive producer, co-showrunner and writer Paul Simms stated "All of our characters are completely pansexual." Nandor says that of his 37 wives, "they weren't all women."	
Eric Northman	True Blood	2008–2014	Alexander Skarsgård	Northman is Fangtasia's owner and the vampire sheriff of "Area 5" in Louisiana. He is described as "complex and mercurial, a pansexual opportunist" by Interview writer Win Butler.	
Ola Nyman	Sex Education	2019–2021	Patricia Allison	After taking an online quiz during downtime at the convenience store she works at with Adam, she realizes that she might actually identify as pansexual. Realizing this helps her start figuring out her feelings for Lily, her fan fiction-obsessed friend that Ola begins having steamy dreams about.	
Colin Robinson	What We Do in the Shadows	2019–2024	Mark Proksch	Executive producer, co-showrunner and writer Paul Simms stated "All of our characters are completely pansexual." Colin is shown to have relationships with both men and women.	
David Rose	Schitt's Creek	2015–2020	Dan Levy	An openly pansexual man, Dan Levy said that him being pansexual "felt very natural for him" and in line with his character in the small town in this series. (Note: However, Dan Levy himself is openly gay.)	
Josie Saltzman	Legacies	2018–2021	Kaylee Bryant	Saltzman is a witch and student at the Salvatore School. She is also Alaric's 15-year-old daughter and Lizzie's twin.	
Sophia	Star-Crossed	2014	Brina Palencia	Sophia is Roman's younger Atrian sister who is always curious about humans. Her actress confirmed her pansexuality on a now-deleted tweet.	
Brook Soso	Orange Is the New Black	2014–2019	Kimiko Glenn	Soso is an inmate at Litchfield Penitentiary.	
Ambrose Spellman	Chilling Adventures of Sabrina	2018–2020	Chance Perdomo	An eccentric warlock, the character shows interest in both men and women throughout the series, and the writers have said they intended him as specifically pansexual.	
Frank Underwood	House of Cards	2013–2017	Kevin Spacey	Underwood is a ruthless politician who rises from United States House of Representatives majority whip to president of the United States through treachery, deception and murder. Showrunner Beau Willimon described him as someone "incredibly guarded with who he lets get close to him, whether that's platonic or whether that's sexual. And when he does, it's not necessarily a gender or preference, it really has to do with trust."	
Max Wolfe	Gossip Girl (2021 TV series)	2021–2023	Thomas Doherty	Doherty states, "playing Max, a pansexual character, was incredibly liberating. It was very educational, and it definitely made me challenge my own preconceived notions, my indoctrination, of 'This is who you love, this is what you do, everything else is wrong.'"	

== Video games ==
Character	Title	Year	Voice actor	Notes	Ref.
Margaret "Mae" Borowski	Night in the Woods	2017			
Iron Bull	Dragon Age: Inquisition	2014	Freddie Prinze Jr.	Iron Bull is a Qunari who serves as a companion party member.	
Lifeweaver	Overwatch 2	2023	Phuwin Tangsakyuen		
Merrin	Star Wars Jedi: Fallen Order & Star Wars Jedi: Survivor	2019–2023	Tina Ivlev	Merrin is a Nightsister and an ally to Cal Kestis.	

== Graphic art and webcomics ==
Character	Title or Publisher	Debut and Duration	Notes	Ref.
Sakura Kinomoto	Cardcaptor Sakura	1996–2000	In an October 2000 interview, Nanase Ohkawa called Sakura a person with an "open mind towards different family structures, different kinds of love, and different perspectives from society," adding that if Syaoran had been a girl, and the age gap had been the same, she would have fell in love with Syaoran all the same. In the same interview she said that Sakura loves Tomoyo but not the same way she feels about Syaoran. In November 2016, Ohkawa added that Sakura is someone who believes that "those around her will be there to catch her."	
Sakura Kinomoto	Cardcaptor Sakura: Clear Card	2016–present		
Princess Koriand'r (Note: Also known as Starfire)	DC Comics	1980	Deriving from being raised on the culture of her homeworld Tamaran, where it's acceptable to have open marriage, Starfire's sex-positivism and free-thinking habits such as a fondness for practicing nudism, openness to polygamous relationships and acceptance of "open sex" and pansexual "free-love" with persons regardless of terrestrial species, race or gender, usually lead her into conflict with Earth's more reserved culture and customs. For Starfire, polyamory was a personal and cultural preference.	
Loki Laufeyson	Marvel Comics	1962	Loki, a frequent shapeshifter, is genderfluid, and is the God of Mischief. His genderfluid identity was confirmed before the Loki series premiered.	
Wade Wilson (Note: Deadpool)	Marvel Comics	1991	Deadpool, a married man, has a list of five "free passes" who he has gotten permission to have extramarital relations with. This list includes Hillary Clinton, Thor (if he ever becomes a girl), Hellcat, ZomBea Arthur, and Spider-Man.	

== Other ==
Character	Title	Medium	Creator	Notes	Ref.
Randy Feltface	Randy Feltface	comedy, puppetry	Heath McIvor	Randy Feltface is a puppet portrayed by Heath McIvor in comedy shows. The character also appear in the sitcom television series Sammy J & Randy in Ricketts Lane	
Gigi the Christmas Snake	Gigi the Christmas Snake	Character comedy	Chris Fleming	Acting as a replacement for Santa Claus, Gigi the Christmas Snake is a snake who breaks into people's houses to deliver a sleeve of tennis balls. He also screams the phrase "I'm pan!" in reference to his sexuality.	

== See also ==
- List of pansexual people
- Media portrayal of pansexuality
- List of animated series with LGBT characters
- List of fictional polyamorous characters
- List of fictional non-binary characters
- List of fictional lesbian characters
- List of fictional asexual characters
- List of fictional intersex characters
- List of fictional trans characters
- List of fictional bisexual characters
- List of fictional gay characters
- List of comedy television series with LGBT characters
- List of dramatic television series with LGBT characters: 1960s–2000s
- List of dramatic television series with LGBT characters: 2010–2015
- List of dramatic television series with LGBT characters: 2016–2019
- List of made-for-television films with LGBT characters
- List of LGBT characters in soap operas
- Lists of LGBT figures in fiction and myth
