= The Outside Story =

2020 American comedy-drama film

- Official poster
- Directed by: Casimir Nozkowski
- Written by: Casimir Nozkowski
- Produced by: Frank Hall Green; Brian Newman; Joseph Stephans; Casimir Nozkowski
- Starring: Brian Tyree Henry; Sonequa Martin-Green; Sunita Mani; Olivia Edward; Asia Kate Dillon; Maria Dizzia; Lynda Gravatt; Michael Cyril Creighton; Hannah Bos; Rebecca Naomi Jones; Matthew Maher
- Cinematography: Zelmira Gainza
- Edited by: Eyal Dimant
- Music by: Alexander Trimpe
- Production companies: Sub-Genre Film; Greenmachine Films; Bayard Productions; More Art Faster
- Distributed by: Samuel Goldwyn Films
- Release dates: August 1, 2020 (Rooftop Films); April 30, 2021 (United States)
- Running time: 85 minutes
- Country: United States
- Language: English

The Outside Story is a 2020 American comedy-drama film written and directed by Casimir Nozkowski. It stars Brian Tyree Henry, Sunita Mani, Sonequa Martin-Green, Olivia Edward, Asia Kate Dillon, Maria Dizzia and Rebecca Naomi Jones.

It premiered at Rooftop Films on August 1, 2020. It was released on April 30, 2021, by Samuel Goldwyn Films.

== Premise ==
While tipping a delivery man, reclusive Charles accidentally leaves his keys in his apartment and finds himself locked out. The inconvenience soon turns into a day of befriending neighbors he had never met, reflecting on his recent breakup, and exploring his feelings and values.

== Cast ==
- Brian Tyree Henry as Charles Young
- Sonequa Martin-Green as Isha
- Asia Kate Dillon as Inez
- Sunita Mani as Slater
- Olivia Edward as Elena
- Michael Cyril Creighton as Andre
- Maria Dizzia as Juliet
- Rebecca Naomi Jones as Amy
- Matthew Maher as Neil
- Hannah Bos as Paige
- Jordan Carlos as Delivery Guy
- David Zayas as Tony
- Nadia Bowers as Sylvia
- Lynda Gravatt as Sara

== Production ==
In August 2018, it was announced Brian Tyree Henry had joined the film's cast, with Casimir Nozkowski directing from his screenplay. Frank Hall Green, Brian Newman, Joseph Stephans and Nozkowski would produce the film, while Evan Thayer and Cameron O'Reilly as executive producers under their Greenmachine Film and Bayard Productions film banners, respectively. In November 2018, Sonequa Martin-Green, Asia Kate Dillon, Sunita Mani, Olivia Edward, Michael Cyril Creighton, Maria Dizzia, Rebecca Naomi Jones, Matthew Maher, Hannah Bos and Jordan Carlos joined the cast. Production began that week.

== Release ==
The Outside Story was scheduled to premiere at the Tribeca Film Festival on April 18, 2020, but the festival was postponed due to the COVID-19 pandemic. It premiered instead at Rooftop Films on August 1, 2020. In February 2021, Samuel Goldwyn Films acquired U.S. distribution rights, and set it for an April 30, 2021 release.

== Reception ==
The Outside Story received positive reviews from film critics. It holds 88% approval rating on review aggregator website Rotten Tomatoes, based on 52 reviews, with an average of 7.1. The site's critical consensus reads, "A refreshingly optimistic look at urban community life, The Outside Story is further distinguished by a layered leading performance from Brian Tyree Henry." On Metacritic, the film holds a rating of 69 out of 100, based on 12 critics, indicating "generally favorable reviews".
