= Outerlands =

2025 American drama film

- Film poster
- Directed by: Elena Oxman
- Written by: Elena Oxman
- Produced by: Marc Smolowitz; Elena Oxman; Henry Russell Bergstein; Asia Kate Dillon; Allison Estrin
- Starring: Asia Kate Dillon; Ridley Asha Bateman; Louisa Krause; Daniel K. Isaac; Lea DeLaria
- Cinematography: Lucia Zavarcikova
- Edited by: Chris Brown
- Music by: Lena Raine
- Production company: 13th Gen
- Distributed by: Wolfe Video
- Release dates: March 10, 2025 (SXSW); November 26, 2025 (North America)
- Running time: 100 minutes
- Country: United States
- Language: English

Outerlands is a 2025 American drama film directed by Elena Oxman and released in 2025. The film stars Asia Kate Dillon as Cass, a non-binary gig economy worker in San Francisco juggling several low-paying jobs to make ends meet, whose coworker Kalli (Louisa Krause) leaves her daughter Ari (Ridley Asha Bateman) with Cass while Kalli goes out of town, forcing Cass to confront their own childhood traumas and abandonment issues when Kalli fails to return from her trip.

The cast also includes Daniel K. Isaac and Lea DeLaria in supporting roles.

The production participated in the San Francisco "Scene in San Francisco Incentive Program" administered by the San Francisco Film Commission.

== Cast ==
- Asia Kate Dillon as Cass
- Ridley Asha Bateman as Ari
- Louisa Krause as Kalli
- Daniel K. Isaac as Emile
- Lea DeLaria as Denise

== Release ==
The film premiered at the 2025 South by Southwest Film & TV Festival.

It was subsequently screened as the closing film of the 2025 San Francisco International Film Festival.

Wolfe Video released the film in the United States and Canada on November 26, 2025.

== Awards ==
At Filmfest München, it won the Queer Media Society award for best LGBTQ-themed film in the program.

At the 41st Independent Spirit Awards, Oxman was nominated for Best First Screenplay.
