= They (2017 film) =

2017 film

- Film poster
- Directed by: Anahita Ghazvinizadeh
- Written by: Anahita Ghazvinizadeh
- Produced by: Zoe Sua Cho; Simone Ling
- Starring: Rhys Fehrenbacher
- Cinematography: Carolina Costa
- Music by: Vincent Gillioz
- Release date: May 19, 2017 (Cannes)
- Running time: 80 minutes
- Countries: United States; Qatar
- Language: English

They is a 2017 American drama film directed by Anahita Ghazvinizadeh and starring Rhys Fehrenbacher. It was screened in the Special Screening section at the 2017 Cannes Film Festival. They was Ghazvinizadeh's first feature film.

== Plot ==
Set in the Chicago metropolitan area, it takes place over a single weekend. 13-year old J, assigned male at birth, is deciding which gender they will be in advance of a meeting with a doctor. J writes in a diary indicating the times they feel like female, male, or no gender. Their bone density is decreasing, so they must stop taking puberty blockers and pick a gender. In addition, the artist Araz and J's sister, Lauren, are marrying so Araz can get residency documents to live in the United States. Araz's parents cannot come to the United States and wish to see him, but Araz fears that if he comes to Iran, he will never return to the U.S.

The ending is deliberately left unclear.

== Cast ==
- Rhys Fehrenbacher as J
- Koohyar Hosseini as Araz
- Nicole Coffineau as Lauren
- Norma Moruzzi as Mom
- Diana Torres as Diana

== Production ==
At the time of production, Rhys Fehrenbacher, portraying J, was in the process of transitioning as a trans man; Ghazvinizadeh met Fehrenbacher in Chicago while researching the transgender population in that city.

The recording of the dialog took place after the production of the film; on many occasions the faces and mouths of the actors are off screen or obscured while they speak. Nick Schager of Variety stated that "While one would like to give the film the benefit of the doubt and say that the audio/video disconnect is another reflection of J’s internal divide, it mostly feels like a technical miscalculation".

According to Baughan, "the film’s enigmatic aesthetic" makes it obvious that the director learned under Abbas Kiarostami.

== Reception ==
Ghazvinizadeh received the George C. Lin Emerging Filmmaker Award at the San Diego Asian Film Festival 2017.

Schager stated that They "is far too airless and artificial to make much theatrical headway after its Cannes premiere"; he cited the "performances [that] are as wooden as the dialogue" and the director being "determined to attune her material to J’s stuck-in-the-middle unease" to the point that They "prevents any empathetic engagement with her protagonist’s dilemma."

Jordan Mintzer of The Hollywood Reporter praised "dream-like visual style" and "its treatment of a subject that has rarely been seen on screen", while he argued that the "naturalistic performances [...] are not always up to the par". Mintzer stated that the transition from the focus on J to the focus on the Iranian Americans "slightly deepen[s] our interest" in the Iranian boyfriend but "[pushes] J out of the picture", and that their conflict was less interesting than that of J. In regards to the actors, he stated "soft-spoken and endearing Fehrenbacher brings some emotional depth to the proceedings" but "neither Coffineau or Hosseini comes across as very captivating performers".

Nikki Baughan of Screen Daily stated that "They is a remarkable multi-layered debut which inspires further investigation" and that Fehrenbacher's performance was "achingly naturalistic" due to his real-life gender transitioning.
