= Eth's Skin =

Webcomic

- A panel from Eth's Skin, showing the characters Miira (left) and Eth (right).
- Author: Sfé R. Monster
- Website: Eths-skin.com
- Current status/schedule: Hiatus
- Launch date: January 1, 2014

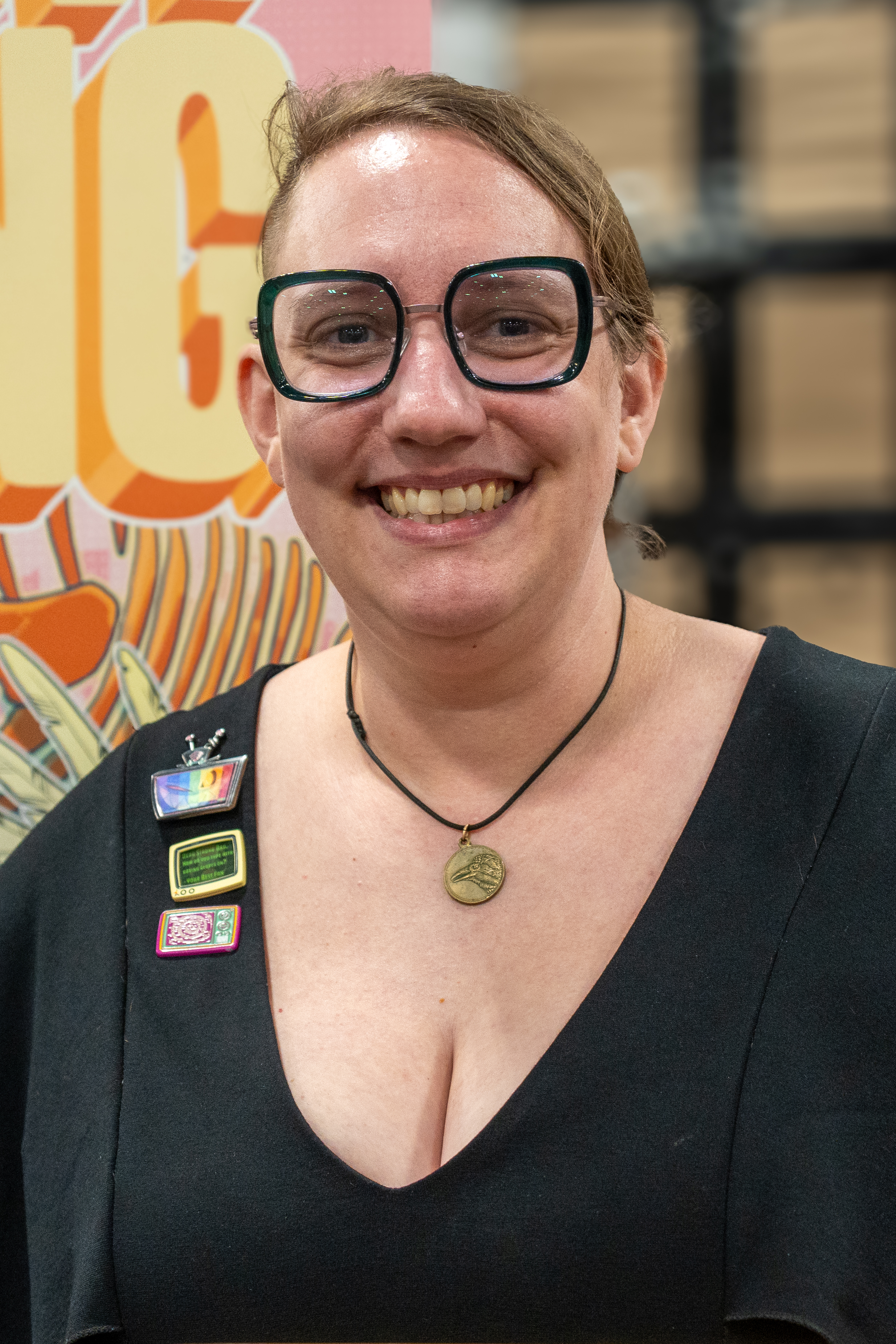
Kory Bing at Comic Con Oakland 2026

Eth's Skin is a webcomic written and drawn by Sfé R. Monster since 2014. Following Eth, a non-binary fisher who lives in a magical version of British Columbia, Eth's Skin tells a story in which the protagonist accidentally picks up the skin of a selkie, which triggers an adventure. Inking on the webcomic is done by Kory Bing.

The webcomic has been on a hiatus since January 18, 2017.

== Synopsis ==
The story of Eth's Skin takes place in a magical version of British Columbia populated by mythological creatures such as pixies and selkies. In this constructed world, humans live in harmony with merfolk and aquatic mammals, and LGBT subjects are inherently normalized. Eth's Skin follows the non-binary character Eth, who at the start of the webcomic lives a peaceful fisherfolk life on a floating township.

One day, while venturing onto land, Eth mistakenly picks up the skin of a selkie, and finds that they are unable to let go of it. The selkie the skin belongs to, Rel, informs Eth that they have committed an unspeakable misdeed by picking up her skin, and the two go on a quest to resolve the situation before news of Eth's actions spreads.

== Development ==
Sfé Monster started publishing Eth's Skin online on January 1, 2014. Inking on Eth's Skin is done by Kory Bing. In 2015, Monster collaborated with Taneka Stotts to create the LGBT-focused comic anthology Beyond.

== Reception ==
Charlotte Finn of ComicsAlliance praised Monster's "expressive" lineart and grey shading techniques, stating that "panels have a stillness to them that perfectly reflects the quietude of the solitary fisherperson." Comic book artist Kate Leth recommended Eth's Skin in an interview with Paste Magazine.
