= Love Me for Who I Am =

Japanese manga series

- English cover of volume one, featuring Mogumo dressed in the cafe's uniform

不可解なぼくのすべてを (Fukakai na Boku no Subete o)
- Manga
- Written by: Kata Konayama
- Published by: GOT Corporation
- English publisher: NA: Seven Seas Entertainment
- Magazine: COMIC MeDu
- Original run: June 1, 2018 – March 5, 2021
- Volumes: 5

Love Me for Who I Am (Japanese: 不可解なぼくのすべてを, Hepburn: Fukakai na Boku no Subete o; lit. 'Everything of the Incomprehensible Me'), commonly shortened to FukaBoku, is a Japanese manga series written and illustrated by Kata Konayama. It was serialized on COMIC MeDu from June 2018 to March 2021. The manga is licensed by Seven Seas Entertainment for publication in North America, with the first volume published in June 2020.

== Plot ==
Love Me for Who I Am follows high school student Mogumo, who lives away from their family home. At school, fellow student Tetsu Iwaoka invites them to work at Question!, a maid café. Mogumo signs on, happy at first because they can present how they want, but soon discovers the reason Tetsu invited them to work there was because he mistook them for a cross-dressing boy. Incensed, Mogumo tells Iwaoka not to assume their gender based on presentation – causing Iwaoka (and the rest of the maid café's staff) to re-think what they know about gender.

== Characters ==
Ryuunosuke Mogumo (a.k.a. Mogumo) (百雲 龍之助, Mogumo Ryūnosuke)
The primary protagonist; a high school student who works for Question! as a waiter. Commonly referred to solely by their surname.
Tetsu Iwaoka (岩岡 哲, Iwaoka Tetsu)
The secondary protagonist; a cis male high school student whose family owns Question!, working there as a cook. He befriends Mogumo after witnessing their loneliness, and gradually falls in love with them.
Satori Iwaoka (岩岡 智, Iwaoka Satori)
Tetsu's older sister; a trans woman and Question!'s proprietor. In the first volume, Tetsu refers to Satori as "brother", but later in the story refers to her as "sister".
Sakura Mogumo (百雲 さくら, Mogumo Sakura)
Mogumo's younger sister; she faces difficulties for not being outwardly "feminine" as she plays football and has short hair. As she is burdened by having to do all the housework, she attempts to guilt-trip Mogumo into coming back to the family home.
Kotone Mizunoe (水之江 琴音, Mizunoe Kotone)
Mogumo's childhood friend; a cis lesbian high school student who is outwardly accepting of Mogumo, but secretly uses them to cope with her internalized homophobia. She is confronted by Mogumo about this behavior, but later reconciles with and finds support from them.
Mei Tatebayashi (館林 めい, Tatebayashi Mei)
A server at Question!; initially presents as a cross-dressing boy (identifying as an otokonoko) but later comes out as a trans girl after confiding in her colleagues.
Sou Suzumi aka Suzu (鈴見 奏, Suzumi Sou)
A gay high school student who works at Question! as a server. He began cross-dressing to appeal to his boyfriend, Haruto, who only his colleagues at Question! are aware of.
Tenmaru Inui aka Ten (犬局 天丸, Inui Tenmaru)
A server at Question!, Ten is a cosplay enthusiast and will cosplay in anything cute. He is talented in costume design, and frequently creates outfits for the others at Question!; Ten is also a high academic achiever, spending much of his time on studying.

== Volume list ==
No.	Original release date	Original ISBN	English release date	English ISBN
1	January 31, 2019	978-4-81-480152-7	June 2, 2020 (digital); June 30, 2020 (physical)	978-1-64-505467-2
2	July 31, 2019	978-4-81-480203-6	October 20, 2020	978-1-64-505762-8
3	February 29, 2020	978-4-82-360029-6	April 13, 2021	978-1-64-827101-4
4	August 31, 2020	978-4-82-360070-8	August 24, 2021	978-1-64-827331-5
5	May 31, 2021	978-4-82-360181-1	January 18, 2022	978-1-64-827578-4
