= Trope (cinema) =

Element of film semiology

In cinema, a trope is a type of stereotypical situation or mannerism of a character that is commonly used in its setting or genre.

A common thematic trope is the rise and fall of a mobster in a classic gangster film; this trope often features the sartorial trope of a rising gangster buying new clothes.

== Etymology ==
The term has the same origin as that of "trope" in the sense of literature, and derived from this. In turn, this came from the Greek τρόπος (tropos), "turn, direction, way", derived from the verb τρέπειν (trepein), "to turn, to direct, to alter, to change". Tropes and their classification were an important field in classical rhetoric. The study of tropes has been taken up again in modern criticism, especially in deconstruction. Tropological criticism (not to be confused with tropological reading, a type of biblical exegesis) is the historical study of tropes, which aims to "define the dominant tropes of an epoch" and to "find those tropes in literary and non-literary texts", an interdisciplinary investigation of which Michel Foucault was an "important exemplar".

The use of the term in relation to cinema may be more common in American English than in other dialects.

== In film studies ==
A trope is an element of film semiotics and connects between denotation and connotation. Films reproduce tropes of other arts and also make tropes of their own. George Bluestone wrote in Novels Into Film that in producing adaptations, film tropes are "enormously limited" compared to literary tropes. Bluestone said, "[A literary trope] is a way... of packed symbolic thinking which is specific to imaginative rather than to visual activity... [when] converted into a literal image, the metaphor would seem absurd."

== See also ==
- TV Tropes, a website that catalogues cinematic tropes as well as literary tropes
