= Asia Kate Dillon =

American actor (born 1984)

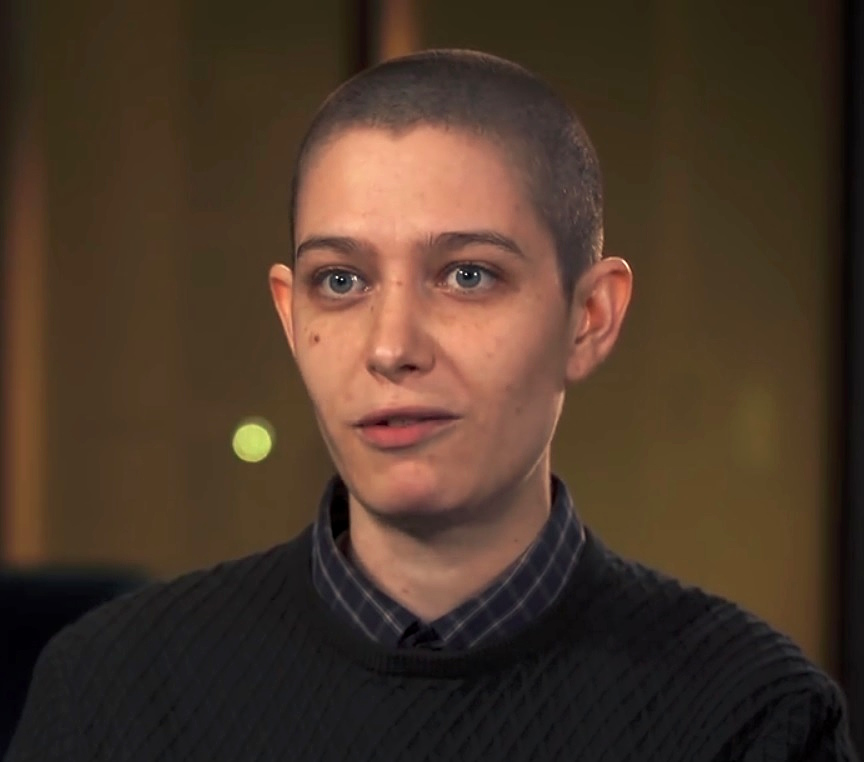
- Dillon in 2017
- Born: November 15, 1984 (age 42); Ithaca, New York, U.S.
- Occupation: Actor
- Years active: 2007–present
- Known for: Orange Is the New Black; Billions; John Wick: Chapter 3 – Parabellum; Gen:Lock

Asia Kate Dillon (born November 15, 1984) is an American actor. They are known for their roles as Brandy Epps in Orange Is the New Black and Taylor Mason in Billions. Dillon identifies as non-binary and uses singular they pronouns. Their role on Billions is the first non-binary main character on North American television, and earned them a Critics' Choice Television Award nomination for Best Supporting Actor in a Drama Series. They also played the Adjudicator in the action film John Wick: Chapter 3 – Parabellum (2019).

== Career ==
Dillon graduated from the American Musical and Dramatic Academy. They enrolled in and completed the Meisner training program at The Actor's Workshop of Ithaca during their junior year of high school at age 16. They were the youngest student ever admitted to the class.

In 2007, Dillon took the title role of Rachel Corrie in the play My Name Is Rachel Corrie. Afterward, they took part in a workshop of plays with Academy Award- and Tony Award-winning playwrights. This was followed by a featured lead role as Lucifer in The Mysteries, and a role in The Tempest at the Shakespeare Theatre Company in Washington, D.C.

Dillon played white supremacist Brandy Epps, a penitentiary inmate, in eight episodes of Orange Is the New Black in 2016, making them one of the first openly non-binary actors cast in a major television show. They also played a recurring role in season 2 of Showtime's Wall Street drama Billions in 2017. The role they played is a non-binary character, Taylor Mason, a hedge fund intern, who is reported to be the first non-binary character on mainstream North American television. Showtime confirmed in April 2017 that Mason would be a main cast member starting in season 3. When submitting their name for an Emmy Award for acting, Dillon was allowed to submit for whichever gendered category they wished, and chose "actor" over "actress" because it is a gender neutral word. Their effort to clarify the matter for all non-binary people prompted the MTV Movie & TV Awards to combine their gender-segregated categories. They presented the award for Best Actor at the MTV Movie & TV Awards on May 7, 2017. In November 2018, it was announced Dillon would appear in The Outside Story.

Dillon is the founder and producing director of MIRROR/FIRE Productions, which created US, a performance piece exploring racism and the Black Lives Matter movement in the United States.

In June 2019, to mark the 50th anniversary of the Stonewall riots, an event widely considered a watershed moment in the modern LGBTQ rights movement, Queerty named them one of the Pride50 "trailblazing individuals who actively ensure society remains moving towards equality, acceptance and dignity for all queer people".

On March 28, 2020, Dillon released their first EP, Handsomehands, with profits being donated to the Marsha P. Johnson Institute.

In October 2026, Dillon posted on Instagram that available acting work had diminished to the extent that they were now seeking jobs in customer service.

== Personal life ==
Dillon was born in Ithaca, New York. They identify as non-binary and were assigned female at birth. Dillon explained that around 2015, they began removing gendered pronouns from their biography, and auditioning for the part of Mason helped them understand their gender identity. Dillon is pansexual, stating they are attracted to multiple genders. In September 2021, Dillon told The Hollywood Reporter's "Hollywood Remixed" podcast that they use the word "non-binary" because their "gender identity falls outside the boxes of man or woman." They stated that gender is a spectrum, without a binary that was "created by colonists and imposed on the indigenous peoples," and that "sex is not a binary either."

== Filmography ==
=== Film ===
| Year | Title | Role | Notes |
|---|---|---|---|
| 2009 | My Popcorn Nights | Asia | Short film |
| 2015 | Opus for All | Homeless woman/Lucifer | |
| 2019 | John Wick: Chapter 3 – Parabellum | The Adjudicator | |
| 2020 | The Outside Story | Inez | |
| 2025 | Outerlands | Cass | |

=== Television ===
| Year | Title | Role | Notes |
|---|---|---|---|
| 2011 | Hitting the Wall | Jocelynn | Television film |
| 2011 | Marcus Garlard: A Necessary Option | Asia | |
| 2015 | Younger | Bald Girl | Episode: "IRL" |
| 2015 | Master of None | Line Lady #1 | Episode: "Plan B" |
| 2016 | We're All Gonna Die | Sex Shop Attendant | Short |
| 2016–2019 | Orange Is the New Black | Brandy Epps | Recurring role (seasons 4–5) |
| 2017–2023 | Billions | Taylor Mason | Recurring role (season 2), main role (seasons 3–7) |
| 2019–2021 | Gen:Lock | Val/entina Romanyszyn (voice) | Web series |
| 2019 | The Simpsons | Paula (voice) | Episode: "Marge the Lumberjill" |
| 2023 | Moon Girl and Devil Dinosaur | LOS-307 (voice) | Episode: "Check Yourself" |
| 2025 | The Bravest Knight | Admiral Akers (voice) | Episode: "Cedric & Pirate Cove" |

=== Theater ===
| Year | Title | Role | Notes |
|---|---|---|---|
| 2022 | Macbeth | Malcolm | Broadway revival staged at the Longacre Theatre |

=== Video games ===
| Year | Title | Role | Notes |
|---|---|---|---|
| 2020 | Fast & Furious Crossroads | Cam Stone | Voice and motion capture |

== Awards and nominations ==
| Year | Award | Category | Work | Result |
|---|---|---|---|---|
| 2017 | Critics' Choice Television Awards | Best Supporting Actor in a Drama Series | Billions | Nominated |
| 2018 | Screen Actors Guild Award | Outstanding Performance by an Ensemble in a Comedy Series | Orange Is the New Black | Nominated |
| 2018 | Critics' Choice Television Awards | Best Supporting Actor in a Drama Series | Billions | Nominated |
| 2019 | Critics' Choice Television Awards | Best Supporting Actor in a Drama Series | Billions | Nominated |
