= LGBTQ representation in The Simpsons =

The Simpsons has historically been open to portrayals of LGBT characters and settings, and it has routinely challenged heteronormativity. It was one of several animated television shows in the United States that began introducing characters that were LGBT, both openly and implied, in the 1990s. While early episodes involving LGBT characters primarily included them through the use of stereotypes, The Simpsons developed several prominent LGBT characters over its run. Producers of the show, such as Matt Groening and Al Jean, have expressed their opinion that LGBT representation in media is important, and that they seek to actively include it. Some characters, such as Julio, were created with their sexual orientation in mind, with it being central to their character. The show expanded its roster of openly LGBT characters through episodes in which prominent characters Patty Bouvier and Waylon Smithers came out in seasons 16 and 27, respectively. Additionally, producer Al Jean has stated that Lisa Simpson is possibly polyamorous.

== Supporting characters ==
=== Patty Bouvier ===
Patty Bouvier was revealed to be lesbian in season 16 episode "There's Something About Marrying", which follows Homer Simpson as he is ordained to perform same-sex marriages. Producer Al Jean had announced that a character would come out prior to the episode's airing, prompting widespread speculation. Patty was the character that fans most suspected would come out. The episode aired in 2005, when same-sex marriage was a major political issue in the United States. The move was controversial, provoking outrage from opponents to same-sex marriage. Entertainment columnist Ray Richmond credited Patty's coming out as a significant milestone for the gay rights movement, as it proved that the movement was prominent enough to feature in an episode of a mainstream sitcom.

Some groups have criticised the depiction of Veronica in the episode (a parody of trans pro golfer Mianne Bagger) as transphobic.

=== Kang and Kodos ===
The gender and sexuality of the extraterrestrial characters Kang and Kodos has been portrayed in different ways throughout the series. They are typically depicted as male, but Kodos was identified as Kang's sister in the season 8 episode "Treehouse of Horror VII", and they were identified as a lesbian couple in the season 26 episode "Simpsorama". Producer Al Jean has described their gender as intentionally vague, with the show sometimes implying that they were androgynous. After the episode "Simpsorama", Jean confirmed that "they're a gay female couple" and that they "seemed to be married".

=== Waylon Smithers ===
Waylon Smithers was widely alluded to as gay in the early years of the show, and he was regularly depicted as being attracted to his boss, Mr. Burns. Even before his character came out, he was generally recognized as a portrayal of a gay man on television, and his character's sexuality was among the earliest examples of a fandom debate on the internet. This was alluded to in the season 7 episode "The Simpsons 138th Episode Spectacular", in which host Troy McClure reads a fictional fan letter that asks "What is the real deal with Mr. Burns' assistant Smithers? You know what I'm talking about."

Because of the regular jokes about Smithers' sexuality, he was one of the characters speculated to be gay after it was announced that a character would come out in 2005. Producer Al Jean described Smithers' sexual orientation for much of the show as "Burns-osexual", explaining that his devotion to Burns outweighs attraction to any particular gender. Allusions to Smithers' sexuality became more direct over the show's run, with Burns explicitly being recognized as a romantic interest for Smithers as early as the season 4 episode "Marge Gets a Job". It is implied more heavily in the season 6 episode "Sideshow Bob Roberts" when Smithers describes conservatism as incompatible with his "choice of lifestyle". In the season 9 episode "Lisa the Skeptic", Smithers kisses Burns. The character came out in the season 27 episode "The Burns Cage" in 2016. His romantic life was explored again in the season 33 episode "Portrait of a Lackey on Fire". The son of writer Rob LaZebnik was heavily involved in writing Smithers' romantic storyline, drawing from his own experiences as a gay man.

== Minor characters ==
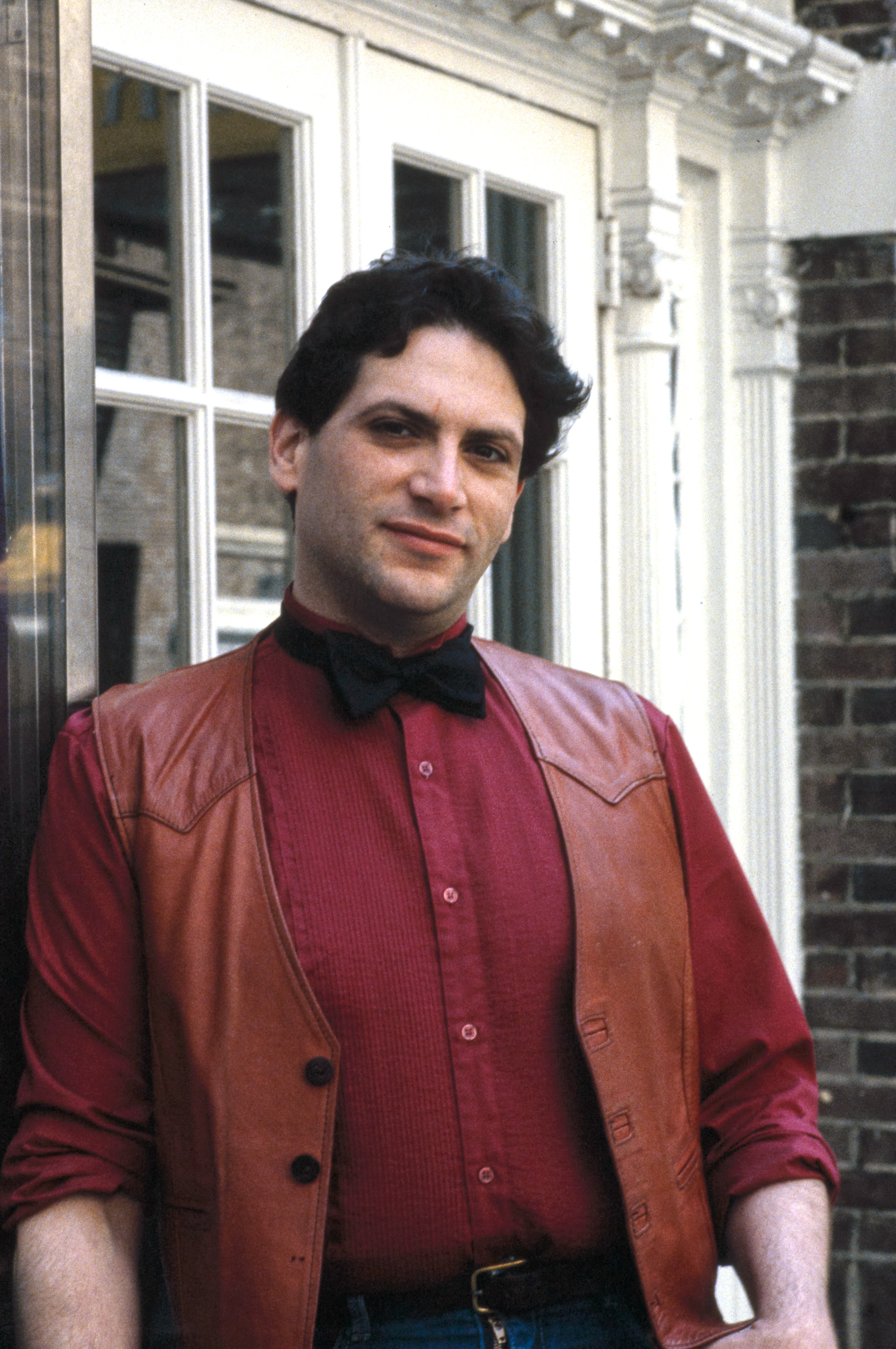
Harvey Fierstein voiced the character Karl in "Simpson and Delilah".

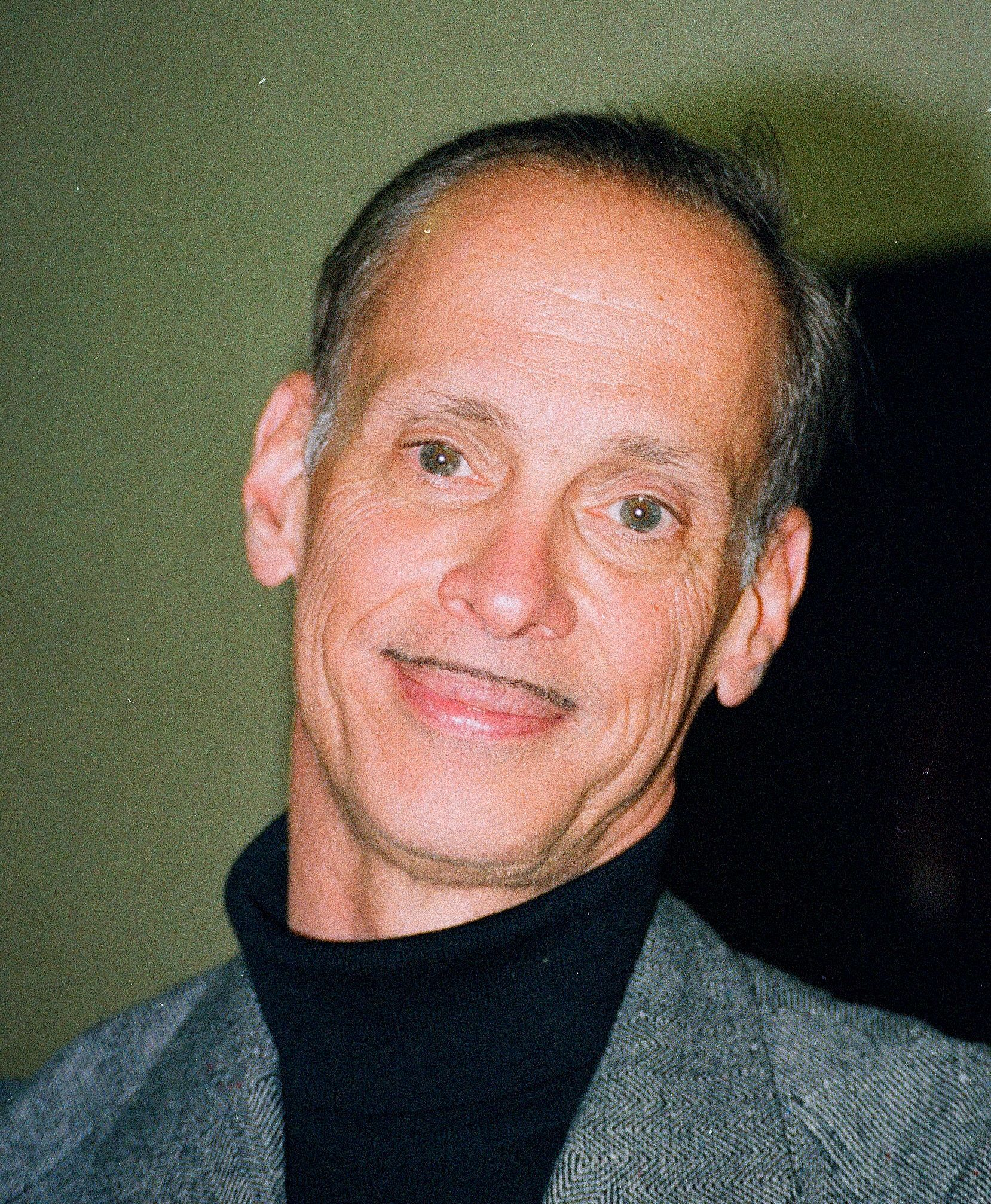
John Waters voiced the character John in "Homer's Phobia".

- Karl – Homer's assistant in the season 2 episode "Simpson and Delilah". The character was voiced by openly gay actor Harvey Fierstein and was originally intended to look like him, but Fierstein insisted that the character look more traditionally handsome. The character was intended to return in the season 14 episode "Three Gays of the Condo", but Fierstein was unsatisfied with the script.
- John – An openly gay man who features in the season 8 episode "Homer's Phobia" in 1997. The episode follows Homer as he comes to accept John as a gay man, and as he allows his son Bart to deviate from traditionally masculine ideas. John is voiced by John Waters.
- Grady – A gay man who Homer lived with in the season 14 episode "Three Gays of the Condo". Grady sees Homer as a romantic interest and kisses him, causing Homer to leave.
- Julio – A prominent figure within the show's LGBT community. The character was originally voiced by Hank Azaria, but the role was recast to Tony Rodriguez in 2021 in an effort to increase the diversity of the cast to better reflect the characters. Like the character of Julio, Rodriguez is an openly gay Cuban man. Julio was briefly a romantic interest of Waylon Smithers.
- Dewey Largo – The music teacher at Springfield Elementary School. He was implied to be gay for much of the show's run. Rather than a formal coming out, the character gradually came to be recognized as an openly gay character. His sexual orientation was confirmed after he found a partner at Moe's Tavern while it was converted into a gay bar in the season 22 episode "Flaming Moe".
- Grizzly Shawn – A bear, who debuted in the episode season 22 episode "Flaming Moe" as part of the new LGBT customers arriving at Moe's bar.
- Paula – A friend of Patty who becomes Marge's team partner as lumberjill in the season 31 episode "Marge the Lumberjill". Paula is voiced by the non-binary actor Asia Kate Dillon.
- Evelyn – Patty's girlfriend in the season 31 episode "Livin La Pura Vida". She befriends Homer after she and Patty get into an argument, which mends the relationship between her and Patty.
- Michael De Graaf – A fashion designer who began a romantic relationship with Waylon Smithers in the season 33 episode "Portrait of a Lackey on Fire". De Graaf is voiced by Victor Garber.

== See also ==
- List of animated series with LGBTQ characters
- List of recurring The Simpsons characters
- LGBTQ themes in Western animation
