= List of Demon King Daimao episodes =

Episodes of Japanese anime series

Ichiban Ushiro no Dai Maō a 2010 anime television series based on the light novels written by Shotaro Mizuki and illustrated by Souichi Itō, published by Hobby Japan under its HJ Bunko imprint. The anime covers the first 5 novel volumes. Produced by Artland, the series is directed by Takashi Watanabe, series composition by Takao Yoshioka, music by Tatsuya Kato, and characters by Miyabi Ozeki and Toshimitsu Kobayashi. The series revolves around Akuto Sai, a young man who transfers to Constant Magick Academy, aspiring to become a high priest. His life takes a sudden turn when it is revealed that he will become Demon King in the future, and he soon becomes the target of many students.

The series broadcast on Tokyo MX between April 3, 2010, to June 19, 2010, with subsequent broadcasts on Chiba TV, TV Kanagawa, AT-X, Sun TV, TV Aichi, Nico Nico Channel, and ShowTime, Inc. Simulcasts of the series are provided by Crunchyroll and Anime Network on its video website. The series aired uncensored on AT-X, while it was heavily censored on other networks. Six DVD and Blu-ray Disc volumes were released by Marvelous Entertainment between June 25 and November 25, 2010, each containing an original video animation called Another Demon King's Omake (もひとつおまけの大魔王, Mo Hitosu Omake no Dai Maō). The series became part of Anime Network's Video On Demand service beginning on October 21, 2010. The series is licensed in North America by Sentai Filmworks under the title Demon King Daimao, and Section23 Films released the complete series with an English dub on Blu-ray and DVD on June 14, 2011.

The opening theme for Episodes 2 through 11 and the ending theme for Episode 1 & 12 is "REALOVE:REALIFE" by Sphere, while the ending theme for Episodes 2 through 11 is "Everyday Sunshine Line!" by Natsuko Aso.

== Episodes ==
No.	Title	Original release date
1	"A Demon King is Born!"; Transliteration: "Maō ga Tanjō Shichatta!" (Japanese: 魔王が誕生しちゃった!)	April 3, 2010
Akuto Sai meets Junko Hattori on the train to Constant Magic Academy. The two make a powerful pact to make the world a better place, a pact that will mean death if broken. Upon arrival, Akuto is told he is destined to be the Demon King, and the entire school begins to fear him. After his introduction in class reaches a zealous climax, a fellow student named Hiroshi Miwa looks up to him, while the rest of the class becomes even more terrified. Eventually, Akuto slips up when he volunteers for "cleaning duty", which is slang in the academy for becoming a "cleaner", an assassin that maintains the school's secrets. This infuriates Junko, who challenges him to a duel that ends with Akuto accidentally destroying the classroom in a magical explosion. His later attempts to reconcile with Junko at her dorm again launch her into a murderous frenzy, resulting in a chase through the woods. There, Akuto runs into Kena Soga mid-fight, and she resolves to protect him for personal, though unspecified reasons. She is unable to do so, and Akuto again ends the fight with another freak explosion. Immediately after, he is greeted by Korone, an "observer".
2	"The Odd Observer!"; Transliteration: "Okashina Kanshiin" (Japanese: おかしな監視員)	April 10, 2010
Akuto meets with the principal of the academy with Korone, whom the principal ordered to stay with Akuto as a bodyguard and a judge of whether or not he will truly become a demon king. Akuto meets with Fujiko Eto the following day, who pledges to help him despite his destiny. She later recommends that they meet in secret in the mountains behind the school, and instructs him on how to disable Korone. En route, Akuto and Korone are attacked by a demon dog, an animal mutated by mana. Akuto is able to absorb the creature's mana and return it to a puppy, a feat that astounds Korone. The puppy picks up Kena's scent, whose ability to become invisible is revealed. After deactivating Korone, Akuto rendezvous with Fujiko in the mountains, where she asks him to join the school's disciplinary committee to help clear his name. As an emergency way to reconcile with Junko, she also gives him a two-shot magical gun that fires medicinal tablets, which she claims will allow the two people shot by it to understand each other's feelings. On the way back, he is tackled by Kena, still fleeing from the puppy, and is rendered visible and exposed in clear view of the now-reactivated Korone. In exchange for testifying to Korone that Akuto did not try to molest her, Kena requests his friendship, which he agrees to. At the end, Fujiko is shown contacting Junko, falsely claiming that Akuto had threatened her. Fujiko then enters a secret passage in her room, where she converses with her brother's severed head about her plans for Akuto.
3	"The Scary Upperclassman!"; Transliteration: "Chotto Kowai Senpai" (Japanese: ちょっと怖い先輩)	April 17, 2010
During a late-night soak in the male bathhouse, Hiroshi informs Akuto about the school's underground, and mentions that Junko gained her popularity at the school by fighting this underground. As Fujiko arranges a meeting between Akuto and Junko the following afternoon, Akuto meets with the student council with regard to his application for being the disciplinary committee's representative. Akuto has to deal with Korone in order to meet with Junko, and decides the only way to ensure she is out of the way is by pulling her tail again, which leads to a misunderstanding until Kena interrupts to dump her rice cooker on Akuto (since she was banned from keeping it in her room) as a gesture and proof of their friendship. The meeting with Junko turns out to be an ambush by members of the underground, and Akuto swiftly beats them, only for Junko to appear when the dust settles. Mistaking the act as a wrongdoing, she publicly calls Akuto out for punitive justice, and together with a large crowd of students, chase Akuto around the school. Kena intervenes at the last moment before Junko can complete her punitive justice. Junko admits that the situation got out of hand and that she was partly responsible for the misunderstanding that prompted the mob to come after Akuto, only to have the mob call her out for turning back to Akuto's side. Korone saves the situation by showering the angry mob of students in medicated rice.
4	"Is Solitary Fun?"; Transliteration: "Dokubō wa Tanoshii?" (Japanese: 独房は楽しい?)	April 24, 2010
Kena's intervention manages to somehow make Junko and Akuto friends again, but during a class lesson on mana control, he knocks her unconscious again. Mitsuko recommends that he go into the mental discipline chamber, one where people are said to have died. Akuto gets depressed, but for some strange reason, Korone and Kena tag along and he is caught between the two of them. They find a mysterious map and Kena is intrigued, wondering if it is a treasure map. Fujiko recognizes what the map truly is. The next day, Kena copies the map and posts it all over the school. It becomes the talk of the whole academy, because students keep getting hurt as they try to find the treasure. Akuto, in his role as the disciplinary committee member, insists that they give up looking, but a girl named Eiko Teruya suddenly appears and he ends up having to find it himself.
5	"Beware the Labyrinth!"; Transliteration: "Chika Meikyū ni Goyōjin" (Japanese: 地下迷宮にご用心)	May 1, 2010
Akuto, Korone, Hiroshi, and Eiko go to the school's underground labyrinth to find the spot on the map. They encounter a cloaked being who tries to stop them with swarms of bats, but is easily defeated. Akuto digs up a plush recording device buried under a tombstone that guides them to an abandoned research facility, where they are attacked by an armored statue. Inside the statue, Eiko finds a screen that points to an underground shrine behind a cavern hot spring. Meanwhile, Junko, Kena, and Fujiko make their way to the labyrinth. Junko, who fell underground into the hot spring, tells Akuto that Eiko is actually a government spy. A savage wolf comes after them, but they are saved when Kena and Fujiko arrive. Eiko, in tears after seeing Akuto protect Junko over her, leaves after giving him a key from the shrine. When Fujiko activates the key, it transports them to the headquarters of the student council, who were responsible for the attacks. It is revealed that the headquarters is really the base of the Demon King. Aiming to uncover what her brother had forgotten, Fujiko uses the items her brother left behind to awaken the treasured dragon beast Peterhausen. The dragon beast reacts to an unknown catalyst (implied to be Kena) and replays a record of the events leading to Fujiko's brother's death, causing Fujiko to collapse. An enraged Akuto confronts Peterhausen, soon becoming his new master, despite his wishes. After that, the student council president kisses him as a reward for finding the treasure first.
6	"Let's Go to School by the Sea!"; Transliteration: "Rinkai Gakkō e Ikō!" (Japanese: 臨海学校へ行こう!)	May 8, 2010
Under observation by the government, Akuto is depressed to find out he cannot go to the seaside school on an island. Korone arranges for him to go by offering to take responsibility for him herself. However, she makes constant attempts to seduce him. Akuto tries to enjoy going to the beach with Junko, but both Kena and Korone interrupt when the former two are having fun. Later on, Hiroshi tells Akuto about the legend of the Demon King that is told by the people on the island. The legend says that the revival of the demon king and the dragon will call forth a legendary hero who will defeat them in battle, but Akuto is skeptical. Meanwhile, Lily Shiraishi, informing Fujiko about the government's plan to use Akuto for its own benefit, says that she will handle this situation on her own.
7	"The Legendary Hero Appears?!"; Transliteration: "Densetsu no Yūsha Arawaru!" (Japanese: 伝説の勇者現る!)	May 15, 2010
In a flashback, Hiroshi learns he is destined to become a hero. In the present time, Korone leaves after saying she has failed in her mission, which she hints at her failure to seduce and manipulate Akuto. Yukiko Miwa, Hiroshi's younger sister, goes to Akuto to verify if he is truly the Demon King. After both Akuto and Hiroshi deny their destinies, Yukiko runs off in tears. Hiroshi later explains that beneath the legendary lake is a shrine inside a cave, where there is a sword in the stone. A mysterious man, known as Mr. X, awakens a mana-absorbing sea cucumber beast from the lake. Mr. X captures Yukiko, but Hiroshi and Kena try to fight back. However, Hiroshi is pummeled into the lake and Kena is captured. Akuto and Junko rescue Yukiko and Kena, but Mr. X sends the beast to destroy the village on the island, and then overwhelms Akuto with anti-magic attacks. After Akuto understands the secret behind Mr. X's attacks, Mr. X turns his attention to Junko, Yoriko, and Kena. Luckily, Korone returns just in time to stop Mr. X's attack. Meanwhile, Hiroshi goes to the shrine, pulls the sword out of the stone, and gains the powers of a hero. The sword gives Hiroshi the name Brave, and he uses a plasma-like attack to eradicate the beast. Korone admits that she tried to seduce Akuto in order to teach him how to develop an intimate relationship with someone of status (like Junko), and she previously believed she had failed because it seemed like Akuto had fallen for Kena.
8	"Do You Have a Crush?"; Transliteration: "Ano Ko ni Goshūshin?" (Japanese: あの子にご執心?)	May 22, 2010
Akuto ponders if the hairpiece Kena wears is the same one he gave to her as an orphaned child. Fujiko wants to control a beast of her own, obtaining a demon beast egg after slaying a slug beast. An easygoing Kena still skips class constantly, much to Akuto's worry. Akuto does not realize that Junko actually has feelings for him, especially when Akuto himself is trying to persuade Kena to attend class again. Kena steals the demon beast egg from Fujiko in her sleep, soon hatching into a two-headed chicken beast. Akuto tries to attack the beast, but it evades. Hiroshi quickly annihilates the beast before it causes further damage to the city. Korone later tells a depressed Junko to discuss an omiai to Akuto with her parents.
9	"Marriage Interview Chaos!"; Transliteration: "Tonda Omiai Sōdō" (Japanese: とんだお見合い騒動)	May 29, 2010
Without either of their input, it is decided that an omiai is to be held at Junko's village. Junko, who has feelings for Akuto, is unable to tell him, and so invites him to the village for other reasons. Akuto knows nothing of the marriage interview, but feels responsible for the messes he has caused and decides to go with her. There they meet Yuko Hattori, Junko's younger sister. She is not only revealed as a pop star idol, but she bears a scar on her neck of which was bitten by a demon beast long ago. That night, Junko readies herself and visits his room, where she lets him know why he was invited to the village. This leads to another misunderstanding as several clan members chase Akuto after seeing Junko in tears. As Akuto flees, he is confronted by Eiko, who tells him that the gods have decided Kena as a threat, and orders her clan to eliminate Kena. On school grounds, Kena is saved by Boichiro Yamato, the leader of the Cabinet Intelligence Magic Office, from being assassinated. He only shows interest in making her his own to control the gods, calling her the "principle of identity". Akuto uses his power to transport himself to the school grounds, but he realizes that Yamato surpasses him in strength.
10	"Akuto's Imperial Capital War!"; Transliteration: "Akuto no Teito Dai Sensō" (Japanese: 阿九斗の帝都大戦争)	June 5, 2010
Fujiko appears with a horde of demon beasts, and they all destroy the school grounds. Akuto is unable to heal his wounds from Yamato's attacks. Yamato's subordinate, 2V, goes to Eiko to assemble the Hattori and Teruya clans to join together in an epic battle against the demon king, letting Junko and Yuko to take care of the demon beasts. Fujiko saves Akuto and Kena from Yamato and takes them on a three-headed dog beast towards the student council headquarters. Akuto summons the assistance of Peterhausen to stop the government's doing, taking flight above the city. While Hiroshi faces Akuto in battle, Junko and Yuko are to seek the device responsible for awakening the dragon beast. An aircraft carrier appears and attacks Akuto. Due to the work of 2V, Akuto is subsequently flattened by it.
11	"The Girls' Final Battle"; Transliteration: "Onna-tachi no Saishū Kessen" (Japanese: 女たちの最終決戦)	June 12, 2010
Lily stands outside school grounds to repel against the attempt of all the clan members to destroy the demon beasts surrounding the area. Yamato arrives at the headquarters and kidnaps Kena away from Fujiko. Eiko uses Junko to protect herself and orders her to take out Lily. Even when all fails, Lily does her best to take out Eiko. 2V uses his puppets to fight against the clan in order to force Lily on his side. Lily uses her ultimate attack on him, but he manages to escape. When all hope is lost, Akuto is revealed to have survived 2V's attack from the aircraft carrier. Junko draws her family sword, given by her grandmother, in order to side with the demon king in the name of love.
12	"All Done?"; Transliteration: "Oshimai wa Kanpeki?" (Japanese: おしまいは完璧?)	June 19, 2010
Akuto defeats Hiroshi in the sky, and carries him down to a forest for Yuko to look after him. Meanwhile, Yamato has taken Kena to the shrine and attempts to make the contract with the principle of identity, but Akuto appears and the battle begins in the presence of the gods. Akuto at last defeats Yamato and takes back Kena. He learns that the demon king was created by the gods to make the contract with the principle of identity and destroy humanity. Akuto refuses and declares his intent to kill the gods, causing their defense system to activate. Akuto puts his life on the line to battle the gods, and put an end to the story they have created. Peterhausen gives Kena a dragon tooth as a memento for his predetermined death. Akuto and Kena reunite with Junko, Korone, Hiroshi, Fujiko, Lily, and Yuko. Everyone starts a new semester at the academy, in which the battle of the demon king altered the memories of those involved (except Akuto who is immune due to being the Demon King). However, Akuto is (once again) declared to be the future Demon King, and Junko and the others react the same way they did in the first episode, suggesting Akuto will have to start all over again with the same reputation and troubles.

== Specials ==
No.	Title	Original release date
1	"Thump!? A Swimming Tournament for Girls Everywhere! There's Also an Accident or Two!"; Transliteration: "Mo Hitotsu Omake no Daimaou: Act 1 Doki!? Joshi Darake Suieitaikai! Pori Moaru yo!?" (Japanese: もひとつおまけの大魔王: ACT 01 ドキ!? 女子だらけの水泳大会! ポ○リもあるよ!?)	June 25, 2010
Akuto and Hiroshi host a swim race between Junko and Fujiko. When Junko gets the lead, Fujiko cheats by summoning a slime monster to bind Junko and strip her swimsuit, then summoning a snail monster to ride it to the finish line, but loses control of the snail and gets stripped and bound as well when they collide with the slime. While bound together, the girls angrily fight in the water and trigger an explosion that blows the spectators away.
2	"Junko's Exciting Ninja Scroll?!"; Transliteration: "Mo Hitotsu Omake no Daimaou: Act 2 Junko no Dokidoki Ninpouchou!?" (Japanese: もひとつおまけの大魔王: ACT 02 絢子のドキドキ忍法帖!?)	July 23, 2010
Junko writes a love letter to Akuto with Yuko's help, but Eiko steals it, intending to show it to everyone and humiliate her. While Junko pursues her, she drops the letter near Akuto. Junko catches up to Eiko and defeats her by slashing her clothes apart, not noticing Eiko slashed her own clothes as well. Finding that Eiko does not have the letter, she backtracks in time to stop Akuto from reading it, then is humiliated to finally notice she ran across campus naked.
3	"Keena's Apron of Love"; Transliteration: "Mo Hitotsu Omake no Daimaou: Act 3 Keina no Ai no Apron!?" (Japanese: もひとつおまけの大魔王: ACT 03 けーなの愛のエプロン!?)	August 25, 2010
Kena ate all the rice in the cafeteria just before lunch and tries to escape, but is caught by Akuto and Korone. Korone proposes the two of them cook new rice before the students arrive. Akuto is tasked with blocking the door to keep the students out, but is seriously distracted when the two cook in naked aprons with Korone shamelessly showing him her butt, then Korone accidentally splashes rice and water on Kena and starts licking it off.
4	"Disaster Survival!?"; Transliteration: "Mo Hitotsu Omake no Daimaou: Act 4 Sounan Survival!?" (Japanese: もひとつおまけの大魔王: ACT 04 遭難サバイバル!?)	September 22, 2010
Akuto, Kena, Junko, and Fujiko are stranded in a gym storage shed in a blizzard after Kena touched a cursed rice cooker that teleported them. The girls strip naked and rub against Akuto to share body heat (an embarrassed Junko has to be convinced to do it). They are all embarrassed when the blizzard stops and Korone opens the shed to find them in a compromising position.
5	"Korone's Report. Or rather, Sai Akuto's Uneventful Life"; Transliteration: "Mo Hitotsu Omake no Daimaou: Act 5 Korone Report. Aruiwa Sai Akuto no Tsutsuganai Nichijou" (Japanese: もひとつおまけの大魔王: ACT 05 ころねリポート。 或いは紗伊阿九斗のつつがない日常)	October 22, 2010
Korone starts her daily report on Akuto. She reminisces on him losing control of his magic in class and blasting Junko's clothes off, catching him with a naked Kena when he caught her trying to escape class, then after a suggestion from Fujiko, trying to seduce him in his room. She puts in her report that nothing out of the ordinary happened.
6	"The Student Council's in Ecstacy?"; Transliteration: "Mo Hitotsu Omake no Daimaou: Act 6 Yukai Tsuukai Seitokai!?" (Japanese: もひとつおまけの大魔王: ACT 06 ユカイツーカイ生徒会!?)	November 25, 2010
The Student Council eats some treats made with some of Fujiko's magic powder, which causes all the girls except Lily who didn't eat them to get horny and try to have sex with Akuto, but are stopped and knocked out by Korone and Lily. Akuto returns to his room, only to find Junko and Kena ate some treats, making them horny and try to seduce him. Lily then accidentally eats one.
