= List of animated series with LGBTQ characters =

This is a list of animated series with lesbian, gay, bisexual, transgender, intersex, asexual, genderqueer, and pansexual characters, along with other (LGBTQ) characters. This list includes fictional characters in animated cartoons, adult animation, and anime. This page includes some of those on the list of crossdressing characters in animated series. History of LGBTQ themes in Western animation, and anime and manga are delineated on separate pages.

These lists only include recurring characters, otherwise known as supporting characters, which appear frequently from time to time during the series' run, often playing major roles in more than one episode, and those in the main cast are listed below. LGBTQ characters which are guest stars or one-off characters are listed on the pages focusing exclusively on gay, lesbian, bisexual, and non-binary characters in animation, along with trans, pansexual, asexual, and intersex characters in fiction.

The entries on this page are organized alphanumerically by duration dates and then alphabetically by the first letter of a specific series.

== 1970s–1980s ==
Duration	Show title	Character debut date	Characters	Identity	Notes	Country
1979–1980	The Rose of Versailles	October 10, 1979	Queen Marie Antoinette	Bisexual	Marie enters a political marriage with King Louis XVI of France but falls in love with Count von Fersen. She is considered a love interest of Oscar François de Jarjayes, though their relationship never quite goes beyond master and servant.	Japan
1979–1980	The Rose of Versailles	October 10, 1979	Rosalie Lamorlière	Bisexual	She is the adopted daughter of Nicole Lamorlière, attempting prostitution at one point to get money. She tries to kill Oscar's mother but Oscar stops her and soon takes her as an apprentice, earning Rosalie's admiration and love, as she opens his eyes. She later ends up marrying Oscar's friend, Bernard Chatelet in the episode "A Funeral Bell Tolls in the Twilight".	Japan
1982–1983	Patalliro!	April 8, 1982	Jack Barbarosa Bancoran	Gay	He enjoys flirting with and seducing young boys, having the name of "Young Boy Killer". Women have shown interest in him and he shows no interest, though he did show mild interest in Pataliro's mother Etrange.	Japan
1983–1984	Stop!! Hibari-kun!	May 20, 1983	Hibari Ōzora	Trans woman	Assigned male at birth, Hibari looks and behaves as a girl, expresses interest in having breasts, and has become more feminine after Kōsaku starts living at her household. (Note: Haruyuki writes that Hibari-kun is "the idol of boys at school" and is "a beautiful girl who also feels a woman's sex appeal, the "he" and "her" parts are ambiguous to readers...The main character, Hibari-kun, is a girl but actually a boy, and expresses the air of the 80s through pop culture such as celebrities and popular items." He is referring to the manga, mainly, but the same can apply to the anime.) She has demonstrated romantic interest in Kōsaku and is implied to have zero interest in women.	Japan
1983–1986	SuperTed	October 4, 1983	Skeleton	Gay	Skeleton is one of Texas Pete's two henchmen. He is a living skeleton who is cowardly and behaves in a campy and effeminate manner. Skeleton has the ability to put himself back together after falling apart. He was confirmed to be gay in a 2014 interview with series creator Mike Young. He also appears in The Further Adventures of SuperTed.	United Kingdom
1984–2021	Thomas the Tank Engine & Friends	November 7, 1994	Rusty	Non-binary/Gender-neutral	Rusty is an anthropomorphic narrow gauge diesel engine who works on the Skarloey Railway. While the character was depicted as male in The Railway Series, creator of the television adaptation Britt Allcroft had the intention of making Rusty a "gender-neutral" character, being neither male or female. Initially, beginning with the character's debut in series 4, dialogue and narration would avoid referring to Rusty with any gender specific pronouns. However, starting with the series 9 episode "Tuneful Toots", Rusty would instead be referred to with masculine pronouns.	United Kingdom
1985–1987	Fight! Iczer One	October 19, 1985	Cobalt	Lesbian	A combat officer who is in love with Sepia, a non-commissioned officer. Cobalt is in a romantic relationship with Sepia, occasionally kissing her in this "classic of early anime."	Japan
1985–1987	Fight! Iczer One	October 19, 1985	Sepia	Lesbian	Combat officer and ruthless warrior, who is in love with Cobalt, later becoming distraught after her demise. She is in an intimate relationship with Cobalt.	Japan
1985–1987	Fight! Iczer One	October 19, 1985	Iczer-1	Lesbian	Iczer-1 is Nagisa's partner, choosing her so she can awaken her power as a warrior. She has a romantic and intimate relationship with Nagisa throughout the series.	Japan
1985–1987	Fight! Iczer One	October 19, 1985	Nagisa Kanou	Lesbian	Initially, she disliked Iczer-1, but eventually decides to fight with her, and protect her. She and Iczer-1 eventually developed a romantic relationship.	Japan
1986–1989	Dragon Ball	January 14, 1987	General Blue	Gay	A canon gay character and Nazi, who is series antagonist, having an entire saga focused on him. He also makes an appearance in Dragon Ball GT. He is attracted to Trunks/Future Trunks.	Japan
1989–1990	Alfred J. Kwak	December 24, 1989	Ollie de Ooievaar	Trans man	Ollie is one of the protagonist's close friends. At the start of the series he is referred to with female pronouns, but after a timeskip he starts using male pronouns. This is never directly addressed during the series. In 2013, the series creator, Herman van Veen, confirmed Ollie as a trans man, saying "I thought it was a nice idea...He now flies through life as a man, but maybe one day he will become a woman again."	The Netherlands
1989–present	The Simpsons	December 17, 1989	Patty Bouvier	Lesbian	Patty officially came out in a 2005 episode, "There's Something About Marrying", which was one of the episodes that carried the occasional warning of content that might be unsuitable for children. She is identical to her sister, Selma, but is a lesbian, and is a recurring character. Like Dewey and Smithers, she is a recurring gay character. In "Livin La Pura Vida", Patty had a new girlfriend named Evelyn, voiced by lesbian actress Fortune Feimster. Series creator Matt Groening said that the staff wanted to out Patty as gay because portraying her as a "love-starved spinster [...] seemed old" on the show.	United States
1989–present	The Simpsons	December 17, 1989	Dewey Largo	Gay	Mr. Largo is the school's music teacher, whose last name is also an Italian word for a slow, broad, musical tempo. A recurring gag in episodes such as "See Homer Run", are allusions that Largo is gay. A later episode, "Flaming Moe", confirmed that Largo is gay and was in a relationship with an older man, also named Dewey. Mr. Largo broke up with Dewey in the season 30 episode "Werking Mom". As of season 33, he is dating another man named Geoffrey.	United States
1989–present	The Simpsons	January 21, 1990	Waylon Smithers	Gay	Smithers is a semi-closeted gay man. Waylon Smithers and Patty Bouvier ride a float called "Stayin' in the Closet!" during Springfield's annual gay pride parade in a 2002 episode, "Jaws Wired Shut". In a 2016 episode, "The Burns Cage", Smithers officially comes out as gay. Mr. Smithers' relationship with Mr. Burns has long been a running gag on The Simpsons, and during the Bill Oakley/Josh Weinstein era, Al Jean and David Silverman called Smithers "Burns-sexual", but later the writers started to enjoy writing about Smithers and Burns' relationship in Season 2, and in September 2015, it was confirmed by Jean that Smithers would come out to Mr. Burns in "The Burns Cage". In "Portrait of a Lackey on Fire", Smithers had a new boyfriend named Michael de Graaf, voiced by Victor Garber, a gay actor.	United States
1989–present	The Simpsons	November 21, 2001	Brunella Pommelhorst	Transgender	Mrs. Pommelhorst is the gym teacher who announced his intention to take time off and return as "Mr. Pommelhorst, the shop teacher" in the episode "My Fair Laddy", although she later returned as the same.	United States
1989–present	The Simpsons	April 13, 2003	Grady Little	Gay	They are a stereotypical gay couple who later break up, with Julio later married to Thad, shown in episodes such as "Three Gays of the Condo". Julio is known in later seasons for being Marge's recurring hairdresser. Grady is voiced by gay comedian Scott Thompson while Julio has been voiced by gay actor Tony Rodriguez since 2021.	United States
1989–present	The Simpsons	April 13, 2003	Julio Franco	Gay	They are a stereotypical gay couple who later break up, with Julio later married to Thad, shown in episodes such as "Three Gays of the Condo". Julio is known in later seasons for being Marge's recurring hairdresser. Grady is voiced by gay comedian Scott Thompson while Julio has been voiced by gay actor Tony Rodriguez since 2021.	United States

== 1990s ==
The depiction of LGBTQ characters in animated series in the 1990s changed significantly from those in previous decades. Some of the most prominent series during this decade which featured LGBTQ characters were Sailor Moon, South Park, Revolutionary Girl Utena, King of the Hill, Cardcaptor Sakura and Futurama featured prominent LGBTQ characters, which some called among the most important anime of the 1990s. Revolutionary Girl Utena influenced the creator of Steven Universe, Rebecca Sugar, calling a series which "plays with the semiotics of gender" which really stuck with her. Additionally, during this decade, Family Guy and SpongeBob SquarePants premiered, with LGBTQ protagonists in both shows, although it was only implied in the latter show. Benjamin Gluck's short film, Man's Best Friend, also featured an openly LGBTQ pink dog.

== 2000s ==
The depiction of LGBTQ characters in animated series in the 2000s changed significantly from the previous decade. In 1999, Simpsons and The Critic producer Mike Reiss who hoped to do something "good for the gay audience" produced Queer Duck, the first animated TV series with homosexuality as a predominant theme. The show became relatively influential after premiering online on Icebox.com, then later shown on Showtime starting in 2000, and was received well by some in the LGBTQ community. While LGBTQ characters appeared in shows such as The Grim Adventures of Billy & Mandy, Red vs. Blue, and The Boondocks, the ongoing show, American Dad, which premiered in 2005, had an LGBTQ character as a protagonist, Roger. While the gay news anchors Greg Corbin and Terry Bates were recurring characters in the show, Roger, a space alien who lives with the Smith family, has an ambiguous sexuality.

== 2010s ==
The depiction of LGBTQ characters in animated series in the 2010s changed significantly from the previous decade; especially in Western animation. One of the shows cited as being the most influential for this change in representation is Steven Universe, created by Rebecca Sugar and aired on Cartoon Network. As GLAAD put it in their 2019–2020 report, the show continues to "go above and beyond when it comes to inclusive storytelling." The series, She-Ra and the Princesses of Power, developed by ND Stevenson, included LGBTQ characters, premiered in November 2018. Voltron: Legendary Defender, which aired from 2016 to 2018, attracted controversy for its depiction of LGBTQ characters, especially killing off a gay character, with some saying the show was following a stereotype known as "burying your gays" The 2014–2017 animated adult sitcom, BoJack Horseman, was one of the first mainstream pieces of media to feature an asexual main protagonist, Todd Chavez, where he questions his sexual identity at the end of the 3rd season, and embraces his asexuality in Season 4. The 2010s also included LGBTQ characters in animated series, such as Marceline the Vampire Queen and Princess Bubblegum in Adventure Time, Korra and Asami in The Legend of Korra, and Mr. Ratburn and his husband from Arthur. Harley Quinn and Poison Ivy appeared in the first season of Harley Quinn from 2019 to 2020, but their romance was not expanded until seasons 2 and 3 in 2020 and 2022.

== 2020s ==
The depiction of LGBT characters in animated series in the 2020s changed from the 2010s, accelerating like never seen before, especially when it came to Western animation. The Owl House featured some of the first LGBTQ protagonists in a Disney show, while Kipo and the Age of Wonderbeasts had a prominent gay relationship not previously seen in animation. In adult animation, Magical Girl Friendship Squad and Helluva Boss broke ground, with the former including a lesbian protagonist and the latter including one bisexual character and one pansexual character. However, in 2020, She-Ra and the Princesses of Power and Steven Universe Future, both of which had various LGBTQ characters, ended. In anime, LGBTQ characters appeared in various productions, such as Adachi and Shimamura, Assault Lily Bouquet, and My Next Life as a Villainess: All Routes Lead to Doom!.

== See also ==
- List of animated films with LGBTQ characters
- Lists of television programs with LGBT characters
- Lists of feature films with LGBT characters
- List of graphic art works with LGBT characters
- List of fictional polyamorous characters
