= Haruo Satō =

Haruo Satō may refer to:

- Haruo Satō (novelist) (佐藤 春夫, 1892–1964), Japanese novelist
- Haruo Satō (voice actor) (佐藤 晴男, born 1961), Japanese voice actor
- Haruo Sato (water polo) (佐藤 晴雄, born 1945), Japanese water polo player
