= Asami =

- Gender: Female
- Language: Japanese

Origin
- Meaning: It can have many different meanings depending on the kanji used.

Other names
- See also: Asaka; Asako

Asami (あさみ, アサミ) is a feminine Japanese given name and surname.

== Written forms ==
Asami can be written using different kanji characters and can mean:

as a given name

- 麻美, "hemp, beauty"
- 朝美, "morning, beauty"
- 朝海, "morning, sea"

The given name can also be written in hiragana or katakana.

as a surname

- 浅見, "shallow, look"
- 浅海, "shallow sea"

== People ==
with the given name Asami

- Asami Abe (安倍 麻美; born 1985), Japanese singer
- Asami Chiba (千葉 麻美; born 1985), Japanese sprinter
- Asami Hirono (広野 あさみ; born 1990), Japanese snowboarder
- Asami Imai (今井 麻美; born 1977), Japanese voice actress
- Asami Imajuku (今宿 麻美; born 1978), Japanese fashion model, actress, and singer
- Asami Jō (城 麻美; born 1975), Japanese AV Idol
- Asami Kai (甲斐 麻美; born 1987), Japanese actress
- Asami Kimura (木村 麻美; born 1984), Japanese pop singer
- Asami Kodera (小寺 麻美; born 1978), Japanese female mixed martial artist
- Asami Konno (紺野 あさ美; born 1987), Japanese pop singer
- Asami Mizukawa (水川 あさみ; born 1983), Japanese actress
- Asami Nagakiya (長木谷 麻美; 1985–2016), Japanese musician
- Asami Sanada (真田 アサミ; born 1977), Japanese voice actress
- Asami Seto (瀬戸 麻沙美; born 1993), Japanese voice actress
- Asami Shimoda (下田 麻美; born 1986), Japanese voice actress
- Asami Sugiura (杉浦 亜紗美; born 1985), Japanese actress and AV Idol
- Asami Tachibana (橘 麻美; born 1987), Japanese composer, arranger, pianist and music producer
- Asami Tada (多田 あさみ; born 1988), Japanese gravure idol
- Asami Tano (田野 アサミ; born 1987), Japanese voice actress
- Asami Tojo (東城 麻美; 1972–2007), Japanese manga artist
- Asami Ueno (上野愛 咲美; born 2001), Japanese professional Go player
- Asami Yoshida (voice actress) (吉田 麻実), Japanese voice actress
- Asami Yoshida (basketball) (吉田 亜沙美; born 1987), Japanese professional basketball player
- Asami Zdrenka, English-Japanese pop singer

with the surname Asami

- Atsuo Asami (浅見 敦夫), Japanese astronomer
- Haruna Asami (浅見 八瑠奈; born 1988), Japanese judoka.
- Hikaru Asami (朝海 ひかる; born 1972), Japanese performing artist
- Mina Asami (浅見 美那; born 1958), Japanese TV actress
- Reina Asami (浅見 れいな; born 1983), Japanese actress and mode
- Sayaka Asami (浅見 清香), the participant in the obstacle course competition show Kunoichi
- Yuma Asami (麻美 ゆま), Japanese adult video actress

== Fictional characters ==
with the given name Asami

- Asami Matsumoto (朝海), a minor character in the anime and manga series Nana
- Asami Yamazaki (麻美), a central character from the 1999 Japanese horror film Audition
- Asami Sato, a character in the animated series The Legend of Korra.
- Asami Nakaoka, a character in the ongoing Japanese manga Highschool of the Dead, who made a brief but significant appearance for a few chapters.
- Asami Minagawa, a secondary character from Mushi-Uta.

with the family name Asami

- Chiaki Asami (浅見), a character in the manga series Sanctuary
- Ryuichi Asami (麻見), a character in the manga series Finder
- Saki Asami (浅海 サキ), a character in the manga series Puella Magi Kazumi Magica
