= Arts Vision =

Japanese talent agency

Arts Vision Incorporated
- Logo used since 2016
- Native name: 株式会社アーツビジョン
- Romanized name: Kabushiki-gaisha Ātsu Bijon
- Type: Private
- Industry: Voice acting
- Founded: June 1, 1984; 42 years ago
- Founder: Sakumi Matsuda
- Headquarters: Yoyogi, Shibuya, Tokyo, Japan
- Services: Talent management
- Website: artsvision.co.jp

Arts Vision Incorporated (Japanese: 株式会社アーツビジョン, Hepburn: Kabushiki-gaisha Ātsu Bijon), stylized as ARTSVISION, is a Japanese talent agency based in Yoyogi, Shibuya, Tokyo that employs many high-profile voice actors. It was founded in 1984 by Sakumi Matsuda.

== General information ==
Arts Vision was founded by former Tokyo Actor's Consumer's Cooperative Society manager Sakumi Matsuda as an independent corporation in 1984.

The studio became famous in the 1990s during a boom time in the popularity of voice actors and voice-over acting. At its peak, the studio employed many of Japan's most popular voice actors, who became known as "Seiyū Idols." In 1997, however, many of those popular young performers moved to I'm Enterprise, a subsidiary agency also managed by Matsuda. Since that time few new performers have joined Arts Vision.

In 2003, Chihiro Suzuki and Masumi Asano moved from I'm Enterprise to Arts Vision, but in subsequent years the trend has been in the opposite direction, with artists such as Yukari Tamura and Natsuko Kuwatani moving from Arts Vision to I'm Enterprise.

== Currently attached voice actors ==
=== Female ===
- Sayaka Aida
- Yuri Amano
- Azumi Asakura
- Minami Fujii
- Saki Fujita
- Natsumi Fujiwara
- Tomoe Hanba
- Yumi Hara
- Anzu Haruno
- Risa Hayamizu
- Lynn
- Akiko Koike
- Akiko Kōmoto
- Satsumi Matsuda
- Miyuki Matsushita
- Kaori Mizuhashi
- Eriko Nakamura
- Miki Narahashi
- Manami Numakura
- Chika Sakamoto
- Asami Shimoda
- Sayumi Suzushiro
- Ayaka Suwa
- Yoshino Takamori
- Fujiko Takimoto
- Chiharu Tezuka
- Haruka Yamazaki
- Kozue Yoshizumi
- Ayaka Yamashita
- Asami Yoshida
- Masako Miura
- Akiko Hasegawa
- Hiyori Nitta
- Hikari Tachibana
- Reiko Suzuki
- Maki Kawase
- Sayori Ishizuka
- Hina Tachibana

=== Male ===
- Eisuke Asakura
- Isshin Chiba
- Jun Fukushima
- Masao Harada
- Jun Hazumi
- Nobuyuki Hiyama
- Yūya Hirose
- Sōichirō Hoshi
- Mitsuaki Hoshino
- Osamu Hosoi
- Satoru Inoue
- Jun Inoue
- Tomoaki Maeno
- Yūji Mikimoto
- Takashi Nagasako
- Tomomichi Nishimura
- Akira Sasanuma
- Haruo Satō
- Ikuya Sawaki
- Wataru Takagi
- Ken Takeuchi
- Nobuo Tobita
- Kousuke Toriumi
- Yūichirō Umehara
- Takumi Watanabe
- Daiki Yamashita
- Daiki Hamano

== Formerly attached voice actors ==
- Kae Araki
- Yu Asakawa - went freelance (since October 2014)
- Masumi Asano - moved to Aoni Production (since 2007)
- Sachiko Chijimatsu - moved to 81 Produce
- Megumi Hayashibara - founded independent agency Woodpark Office
- Yui Horie - moved to VIMS (since 2007)
- Asami Imai - moved to Early Wing
- Yūki Kaji - moved to VIMS
- Hisashi Katsuta (deceased)
- Yumiko Kobayashi - went freelance (since 2007)
- Mami Kosuge moved to Production Ace
- Kotono Mitsuishi - went freelance (since 2007)
- Toshiyuki Morikawa - founded new agency Axl One (since April 2011)
- Reizō Nomoto - attached at time of death (2006)
- Kumi Sakuma - moved to Amuleto
- Nozomu Sasaki - moved to 81 Produce
- Hekiru Shiina - moved to Voice Kit (since February, 2021)
- Chihiro Suzuki - went freelance (since February 1, 2010)
- Kenichi Suzumura - founded new agency INTENTION (since April 2012)
- Chiaki Takahashi - went freelance
- Yukari Tamura - moved to I'm Enterprise (since 2007)
- Nao Tōyama - moved to INTENTION
- Narumi Tsunoda - moved to Honey Rush (since 2007)
- Yumi Uchiyama - moved to Office Osawa (since 2017)
- Yuji Ueda - moved to Osawa Production
- Chisa Yokoyama - founded new agency Banbina
- Kaoru Fujino - went freelance
- Yayoi Jinguji - attached at time of death (2017)
- Masayo Kurata - moved to 81 Produce
- Yūko Sasamoto - moved to Apte Pro
- Kumiko Watanabe - moved to Sigma Seven
- Miho Yamada - moved to Crazy Box
- Atsushi Ii - attached at time of death (2020)
- Yoshio Kawai
- Hironori Miyata - moved to Best Position
- Kazuo Oka - attached at time of death (2021)
- Katsumi Suzuki - moved to 81 Produce
- Tomomichi Nishimura - (deceased in 2025)
