= Homer's Phobia =

- The Simpsons episode
- Homer meets John. John's design was largely based on Waters' own appearance, but he was animated with thicker hair and a "wavy" moustache instead of his trademark pencil moustache.
- Episode no.: Season 8 Episode 15
- Directed by: Mike B. Anderson
- Written by: Ron Hauge
- Production code: 4F11
- Original air date: February 16, 1997

Guest appearance
- John Waters as John

Episode features
- Couch gag: Someone tries to download the family from the Internet, but finding it too slow, attempts to cancel it.
- Commentary: Matt Groening; Bill Oakley; Josh Weinstein; Ron Hauge; Steve Tompkins; John Waters; Mike B. Anderson

Episode chronology
← Previous "The Itchy & Scratchy & Poochie Show"	Next → "Brother from Another Series"
- The Simpsons season 8

"Homer's Phobia" is the fifteenth episode of the eighth season of the American animated television series The Simpsons. It first aired on the Fox network in the United States on February 16, 1997. In the episode, Homer disassociates himself from new family friend John after discovering John is homosexual. Homer particularly fears that his son Bart will become gay if Bart spends time with John, so Homer decides to do hypermasculine activities with Bart, believing the activities will ensure Bart turns out to be heterosexual.

It was the first episode written by Ron Hauge and was directed by Mike B. Anderson. George Meyer pitched "Bart the homo" as an initial idea for an episode while showrunners Bill Oakley and Josh Weinstein were planning an episode involving Lisa "discovering the joys of campy things". Oakley and Weinstein combined the two ideas, and they eventually became "Homer's Phobia". Fox censors originally found the episode unsuitable for broadcast because of its controversial subject matter, but this decision was reversed after a turnover in the Fox staff. Filmmaker John Waters guest-starred, providing the voice of the new character, John (named "Javier" in the Latin American Spanish version).

"Homer's Phobia" was the show's first episode to revolve entirely around gay themes and received a positive critical response both for its humor and anti-homophobia message. It won four awards, including an Emmy Award for Outstanding Animated Program (For Programming One Hour or Less) and a GLAAD Media Award for "Outstanding TV – Individual Episode" in 1998.

== Plot ==
The Simpsons need money to pay for a $900 repair after Bart damages the gas line. Marge tries to sell a family heirloom — an "authentic" American Civil War doll — to Cockamamie's, a collectibles shop. Marge is disappointed when John, the shop owner, reveals her precious heirloom is a cheap liquor bottle of little value. Despite this, the Simpsons take an instant liking to John, and invite him to their house, where he is fascinated by the many campy items the family owns.

The next morning, Homer tells Marge that he likes John and suggests inviting John and "his wife" over. When Marge informs Homer that John is gay, Homer is horrified. Homer's attitude towards John changes completely, and he refuses to join the tour of Springfield that John has arranged. The rest of the family joins John for the tour and enjoy his company. Bart starts wearing Hawaiian shirts, dancing in women's wigs and eating cupcakes with strawberry icing instead of chocolate icing, which makes Homer worry that Bart might be gay.

Hoping to turn Bart heterosexual, Homer forces him to stare at a cigarette billboard featuring scantily clad women. This backfires when Bart craves slim cigarettes, considered effeminate because they are marketed to women. Convinced Bart needs manly role models, Homer takes Bart to a steel mill. However, all of the mill's employees are effeminate gay men, and the mill doubles as a gay bar called "The Anvil".

Desperate, Homer decides to take Bart deer hunting with Moe and Barney, but they fail to find any deer in the wild and instead go for the captive reindeer at a nearby Christmas-themed amusement park. The reindeer violently attack the hunters, who are genuinely afraid and drop their macho posturing. With help from Lisa and Marge, John uses a Japanese Santa Claus robot to scare away the reindeer and save the hunting party. Homer is grateful to John for saving their lives and grudgingly accepts John's sexuality. As John drives everyone home, Homer tells Bart he is fine with however he chooses to live his life. Bart is confused until Lisa explains, much to his shock, that Homer thinks he is gay.

== Production ==
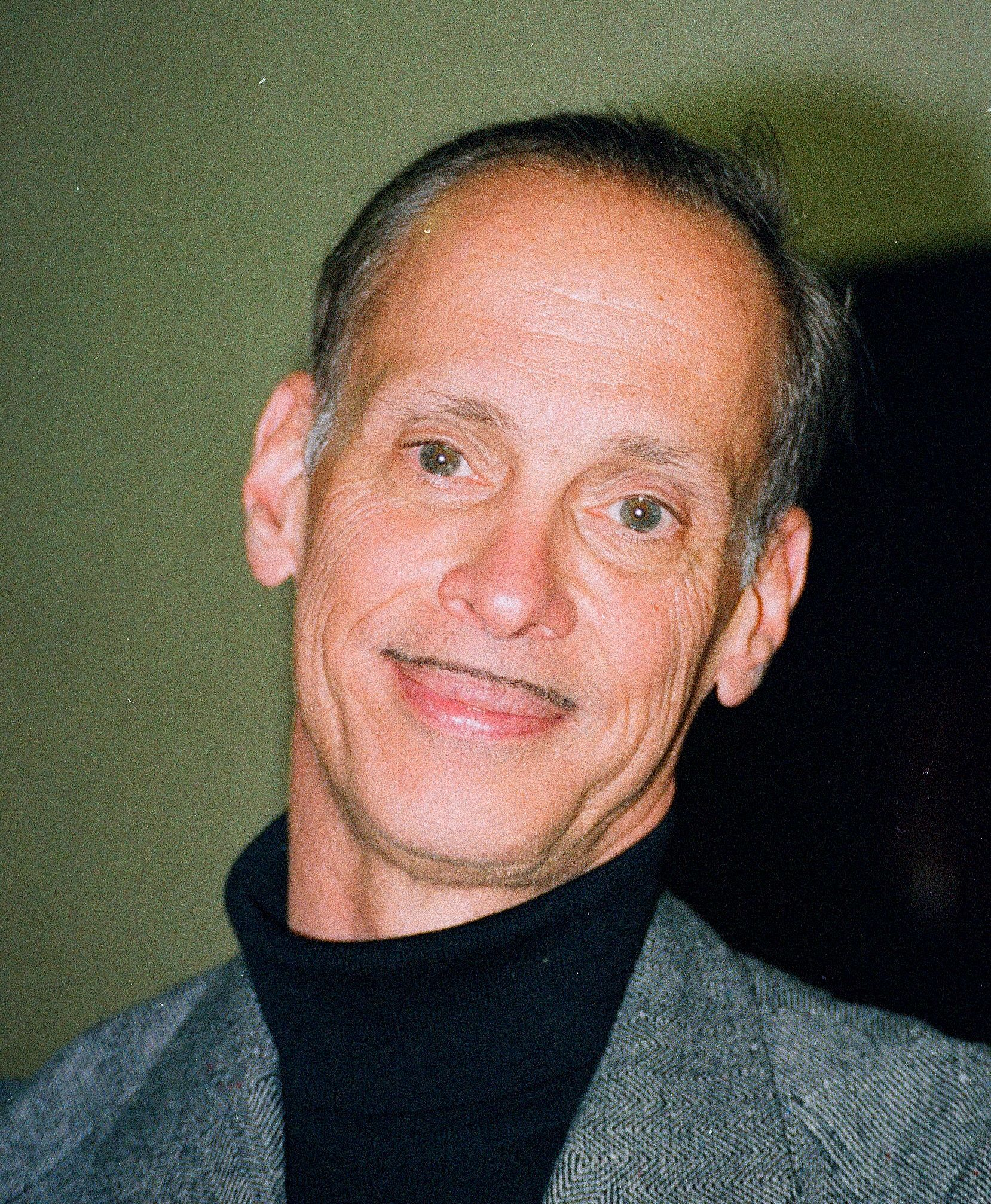
John Waters (1995 photograph) instantly accepted the invitation to guest-star in the episode.

The original concept for the episode came from a few lines of show ideas written by George Meyer. One of them read "Bart the homo", and Ron Hauge was selected to write the episode, with the story stemming from that line. The idea of using filmmaker John Waters as a guest star had been around for a while. Many of the staff were fans of his work, and showrunners Bill Oakley and Josh Weinstein had planned to use him in an episode called "Lisa and Camp", which revolved around Lisa "discovering the joys of campy things". Their idea was combined with Meyer's, and it became this episode. The episode was originally titled "Bart Goes to Camp", but was renamed because the joke was too oblique. Mike B. Anderson directed the episode, telling The Gold Coast Bulletin: "When I read the script I was enthralled, not only because of the visual possibilities, but also because the story felt very solid. It was engaging and surprising and I really put heart into that episode."

Waters, a fan of the show, accepted his invitation to be a guest star instantly, stating that if it was good enough for the actress Elizabeth Taylor, who appeared in the season four episodes "Lisa's First Word" and "Krusty Gets Kancelled", it was good enough for him. He joked, however, about a negative reaction if his character would be made to look like fitness personality Richard Simmons. John's design was based largely on Waters' own appearance; for animation reasons, Waters' moustache was changed from straight to curvy, so that it did not look like a mistake.

According to Oakley, the Fox censor objected to "Homer's Phobia" being aired. The normal procedure is for an episode's script to be sent to the censor and then faxed back with a list of lines and words that should be substituted. However, this episode came back with two pages of notes about almost every single line in the show. The censors stated that they did not like the use of the word "gay", or the discussion of homosexuality at all, and closed with a paragraph that stated that "the topic and substance of this episode are unacceptable for broadcast". Usually the censor notes are ignored as the offending lines and problems are dealt with after the episode has been animated. In this case, the entire episode was deemed a problem, so it could not be solved in this way. The censor problems ultimately came to nothing as when the episode came back from animation in South Korea, the then-Fox president had just been fired and replaced, with the censors being replaced as well. The new censors sent back merely one line: "acceptable for broadcast".

The steel mill scene was written by Steve Tompkins. He first pitched that Homer and Bart would encounter longshoremen, but it was too much work to animate the loading of ships, so a steel mill was used instead. Tompkins also wrote a different third act for the episode, which was never produced. Instead of Homer, Bart, Barney, and Moe going deer hunting and ending up at "Santa's Village" they would go back to the steel mill. There, Homer would attempt to prove his heterosexuality by having a human tractor pulling contest with some of the steel mill workers. It was dropped as the writers found it didn't add anything to the storyline.

== Cultural references ==
The episode features numerous cultural references. The song "Gonna Make You Sweat (Everybody Dance Now)" by C+C Music Factory is played twice during the episode: first as the steel mill transforms into a disco, and second over the alternate closing credits. Homer's record collection includes music by The New Christy Minstrels and The Wedding of Lynda Bird Johnson, the albums Loony Luau and Ballad of the Green Berets by Staff Sgt. Barry Sadler. The song that John picks out and he and Homer dance to is "I Love the Nightlife" by Alicia Bridges, and the song that Bart dances to is "The Shoop Shoop Song (It's in His Kiss)" where he parodies young Christina Ricci from the music video of Cher's version (although he dances to the original version, recorded by Betty Everett). When John is introduced, there is a plastic pink flamingo lying in the background, a reference to John Waters' film Pink Flamingos. Items in John's store include several buttons endorsing political campaigns of Richard Nixon, Dan Quayle, and Bob Dole as well as an issue of TV Guide owned by Jacqueline Kennedy Onassis that features the title characters from the sitcom Laverne & Shirley on the cover. John's car, which bears a striking resemblance to the Cadillac driven by Tony Montana in Scarface (1983), honks the first bar of "Somewhere Over The Rainbow" from The Wizard of Oz (1939), referencing Judy Garland's status as a gay icon. When John takes the Simpson family on a driving tour of Springfield's shopping district, he points out a store where he claims that the Mexican film actress Lupe Vélez bought the toilet she drowned in. This is a reference to the urban legend that Velez was found dead with her head in the toilet the night of her suicide in 1944. The theme park with the reindeer was based on an actual year-round attraction called Santa's Village in the San Bernardino mountains in Southern California that featured Christmas and North Pole-themed activities and rides. The original Santa's Village closed in 1998, and the property has since been redeveloped as an outdoor adventure park and campground.

The couch gag in this episode parodies the AOL Dial-up Internet access sign-on process, parodying it "America On-Link". On a System 7 Mac-like interface, the user attempts to sign in, getting to a stalled progress bar titled "loading family". The unseen user, presumably frustrated with the delay, clicks the "Cancel" button repeatedly, triggering the "Sosumi" alert to be played each time in response. At the time, AOL users suffered significant issues accessing the service after AOL moved from hourly billing to a flat monthly fee, saturating capacity.

== Reception ==
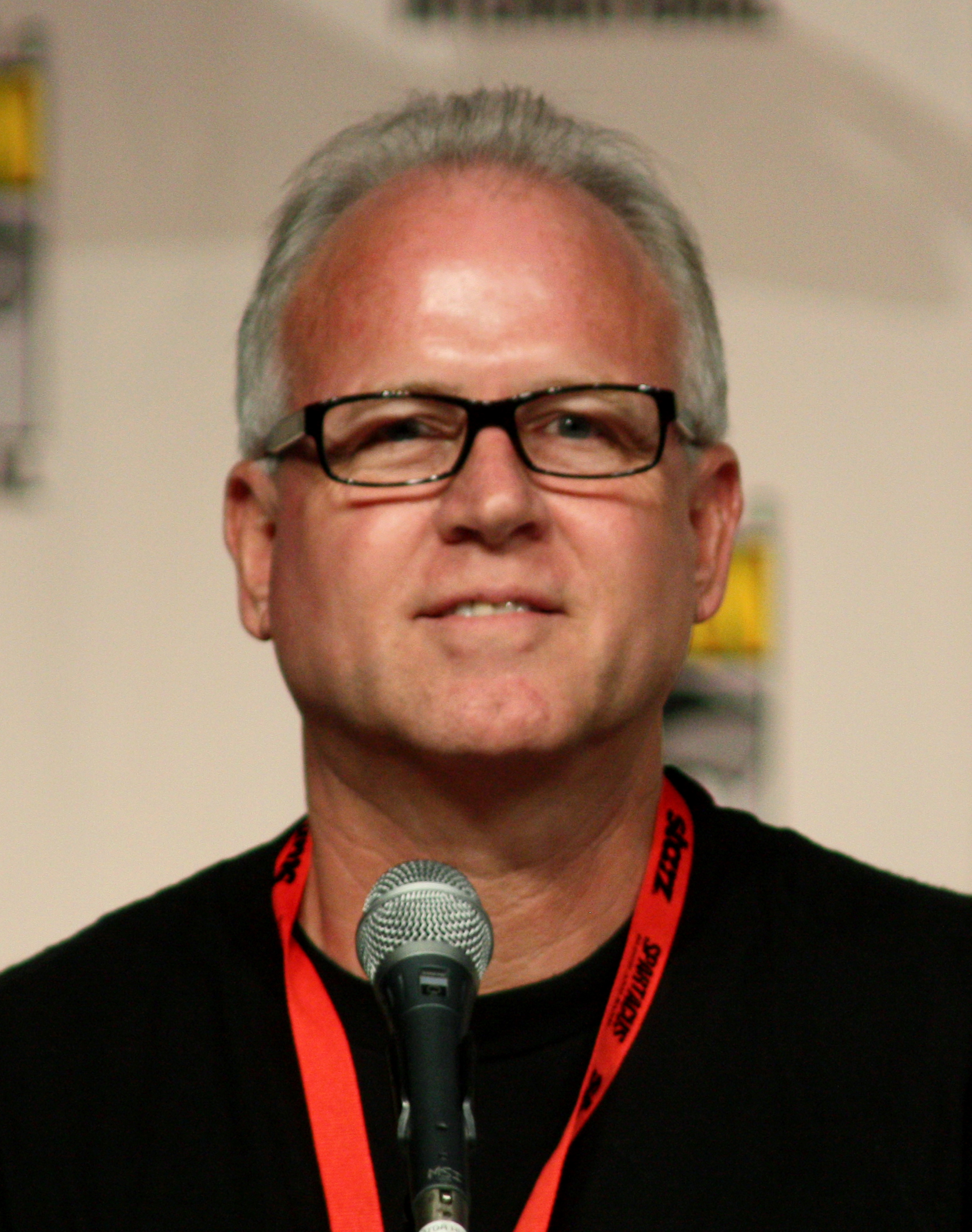
Mike B. Anderson won two awards for directing the episode.

In its original broadcast, "Homer's Phobia" finished tied for 47th place in the weekly ratings for the week of February 10–16, 1997, with a Nielsen rating of 8.7. It was the fourth-highest-rated show on the Fox network that week.

The episode won the Emmy Award for Outstanding Animated Program (For Programming One Hour or Less) in 1997. Mike Anderson won the Annie Award for Best Individual Achievement: Directing in a TV Production, and the WAC Award for Best Director for Primetime Series at the 1998 World Animation Celebration. The Gay and Lesbian Alliance Against Defamation called it "a shining example of how to bring intelligent, fair and funny representations of our community onto television" and awarded it the GLAAD Media Award for Outstanding TV – Individual Episode. Several of the episode's animation cells were selected for display at the Silver K Gallery in Melbourne, Australia in 2001.

"Homer's Phobia" has been cited as a significant part of The Simpsons' exploration of lesbian, gay, bisexual, and transgender (LGBT) themes. The series made several references to homosexuality before the episode aired. In the 1990 episode "Simpson and Delilah," the character Karl (voiced by Harvey Fierstein) kisses Homer, while the recurring character Waylon Smithers is often shown to be in love with his boss, Montgomery Burns, initially suggestively and since then more overtly. However, "Homer's Phobia" was the first episode to revolve entirely around homosexual themes. Two later episodes that explored LGBT issues were "Three Gays of the Condo" and "There's Something About Marrying".

When the episode aired, the production team received "very few" complaints about its content, with most of the response being positive. Alan Frutkin gave the episode a positive write-up in the LGBT-interest magazine The Advocate, calling it "vintage Simpsons." Gary Russell and Gareth Roberts stated in their book, I Can't Believe It's a Bigger and Better Updated Unofficial Simpsons Guide, that: "Only The Simpsons could do this so tongue-in-cheek that nobody could get in a tizzy about it. Very good indeed." In the book Leaving Springfield, Matthew Henry praised the episode's critiquing of "the most common misconception about homosexuality: namely that gayness is somehow contagious", as well as its other themes. Catharine Lumby of the University of Sydney cited the episode as an example of good satire as it "managed to explore a lot of [homosexual] issues in quite a deep way [...] without being overtly political", which she claimed, along with the episode's humor, made its anti-homophobia message more successful than that of other gay-themed shows like Queer as Folk. In his review of The Simpsons – The Complete Eighth Season DVD, Todd Gilchrist said that the episode "certainly qualifies as one of the all-time greatest episodes".

In 1998, TV Guide listed it in its list of top twelve Simpsons episodes. It was placed fifth on Entertainment Weekly's top 25 The Simpsons episode list. In 2003, USA Today published a top 10 episodes list chosen by the webmaster of The Simpsons Archive, which had this episode listed in tenth place. IGN ranked John Waters' performance as the ninth-best guest appearance in the show's history, with TV Guide naming him the third-best film-related guest star. In a 2008 article, Entertainment Weekly named Waters as one of the 16 best The Simpsons guest stars. John Patterson of The Guardian wrote that Waters' appearance "felt to me like a summit meeting between the most influential pop-culture figures of the last 25 years". When The Simpsons began streaming on Disney+ in 2019, former Simpsons writer and executive producer Bill Oakley named this one of the best classic Simpsons episodes to watch on the service.

Conversely, in 2002, Off the Telly writers Steve Williams and Ian Jones named "Homer's Phobia" one of the five worst episodes of The Simpsons, stating that it "leaves such a nasty taste in the mouth," as Homer is "quite simply a bastard" throughout the course of the episode. The pair concluded by saying "this is a side of the show we'd not seen before, nor particularly wanted to see". In June 2003, Igor Smykov sued the Russian television channel REN TV on claims that The Simpsons, along with Family Guy, were "morally degenerate and promoted drugs, violence and homosexuality". As evidence, "Homer's Phobia" was shown to the judge to prove that The Simpsons promoted homosexuality and thus should not be aired again on the channel. The case was thrown out after one day.

In July 2021, Cathal Gunning of Screen Rant argued that the episode made a huge contribution to "normalizing LGBTQ+ characters," noting that they were a rarity at the time the episode aired, and it didn't "treat its first openly gay character as a walking joke." Gunning also argued that the episode was "groundbreaking" because Homer's fear of a gay man, voiced by John Waters, was mocked, rather than Waters' character, and heralded the episode for being "one of the first attempts to break down the invisible barrier faced by gay characters" while noting it lampooned the hypermasculinity of Homer's friends.

== See also ==
- LGBTQ representation in The Simpsons
- LGBTQ themes in Western animation
