= Haruo Satō (voice actor) =

Japanese voice actor

- Born: September 19, 1961 (age 64); Tokyo, Japan
- Occupation: Voice actor
- Years active: 2000-present
- Agent: Arts Vision

Haruo Satō (佐藤 晴男, Satō Haruo; born September 19, 1961) is a Japanese voice actor affiliated with Arts Vision. He is originally from Tokyo.

== Voice roles ==
=== Television animation ===
- Agatha Christie's Great Detectives Poirot and Marple (Major Norman, Bajjiwōsu, Inspector Prima)
- Chaos Dragon (Emmael)
- Cyborg 009 (2001 series) (Actor, man, staff, group members)
- Detective School Q (Detective Tsuchida)
- Digimon Tamers (Supervisory auditor (man in the black suit), Juri's father)
- Elemental Gelade (Fiora's father)
- Gals! (Kitakata)
- Gokusen (Wakamatsu)
- Ichiban Ushiro no Dai Maō (Mr.X)
- Kingdom (Ze Gui)
- Le Chevalier D'Eon (Teillagory)
- Princess Tutu (Book person)
- Skip Beat! (Taishou (Darumaya owner))
- Tokyo Mew Mew (Tsukiko's boss)
- Zatch Bell! (Shelby, Faūdo's heart)

=== Video games ===
- Crash Nitro Kart (Emperor Velo XXVII (Steven Blum), Doctor Nefarious Tropy (Michael Ensign))
- Crash Twinsanity (Doctor Nefarious Tropy (Michael Ensign), Farmer Ernest (Alex Fernandez), others)
- Radiata Stories (Zane)
- Valkyrie Profile 2: Silmeria (Gyne)

=== Dubbing roles ===
==== Live-action ====
- The Agency (Carl Reese)
- Austenland (Colonel Andrews (James Callis))
- Best Sellers (Halpren Nolan (Cary Elwes))
- Dagon (Priest)
- Die Another Day (DVD version) (Colonel Tan-Sun Moon (Will Yun Lee))
- Guardians of the Galaxy Vol. 2 (Sovereign Admiral (Ben Browder))
- Hank Zipzer (Mr. Love (Nick Mohammed))
- John Q. (Steve Maguire (Kevin Connolly))
- Night at the Museum: Secret of the Tomb (Dr. McPhee (Ricky Gervais))
- The Shield (Shane Vendrell)
- Tru Calling (Luc Johnston (Matthew Bomer))
- Up in the Air (Steve (Zach Galifianakis))
- Vigil (Mark Prentice (Adam James))
- White Oleander (Bill)
- X-Men: First Class (Levene (Demetri Goritsas))

==== Animation ====
- The Mr. Men Show (Mr. Grumpy, Mr. Nervous, Mr. Nosy)
- The Powerpuff Girls (Director, Amoeba, Snake, Jerome, Skinny, Mitch Mitchelson, others)
- Regular Show (Pops)
- X-Men (Beast, Bishop, Sabretooth)
- X-Men: Evolution (Beast, Magneto, Juggernaut)
