= Asami Yoshida (voice actress) =

Japanese voice actress

- Born: May 15; Osaka Prefecture, Japan
- Occupation: Voice actress

Asami Yoshida (吉田麻実, Yoshida Asami) (May 15 - ) is a Japanese voice actress represented by Arts Vision. She is a graduate of the Japan Narration Performance Institute.

== Filmography ==
=== Television animation ===
2011

- Tamayura ~hitotose~ (Aunt #B)

2012

- Battle Spirits: Sword Eyes (Takato)
- Detective Conan (Female announcer)

=== Dubbing ===
==== Live-action ====
- The Accountant (Rita Blackburn (Jean Smart))
- All Eyez on Me (Afeni Shakur (Danai Gurira))
- All My Life (Megan Denhoff (Marielle Scott))
- Black Lightning (Jennifer Pierce (China Anne McClain))
- Carnage
- Clerks (Caitlin Bree (Lisa Spoonauer))
- Drop Dead Diva
- Edge of Winter (Karen (Rachelle Lefevre))
- Fantastic Four (Mrs. Grimm (Mary-Pat Green))
- Gimme Shelter (June Bailey (Rosario Dawson))
- Gone (Sharon Ames (Jennifer Carpenter))
- Gunman in Joseon (Choi Hye-won (Jeon Hye-bin))
- Jay and Silent Bob Strike Back (Netflix edition) (Sissy (Eliza Dushku))
- The Letters (Shubashini Das (Priya Darshini))
- Medium
- Mortdecai (Detective (Jenna Russell))
- Numb3rs
- One Day
- Orange Is the New Black (Tasha "Taystee" Jefferson (Danielle Brooks))
- Pandemic (Denise (Missi Pyle))
- The Perfect Host
- Supernatural
- Taj Mahal (Giovanna (Alba Rohrwacher))

==== Animation ====
- The Angry Birds Movie (Betty Bird)
- My Little Pony: Equestria Girls (Cup Cake)
- My Little Pony: Equestria Girls – Rainbow Rocks (Octavia Melody)
- My Little Pony: Friendship is Magic (Granny Smith, Cup Cake, Silver Spoon, Shadowbolt Leader ("Friendship is Magic"), Lily Valley ("Bridle Gossip"), Flitter ("Hurricane Fluttershy"))
