= Natsuko Aso =

Japanese actress and singer

Natsuko Aso 麻生 夏子
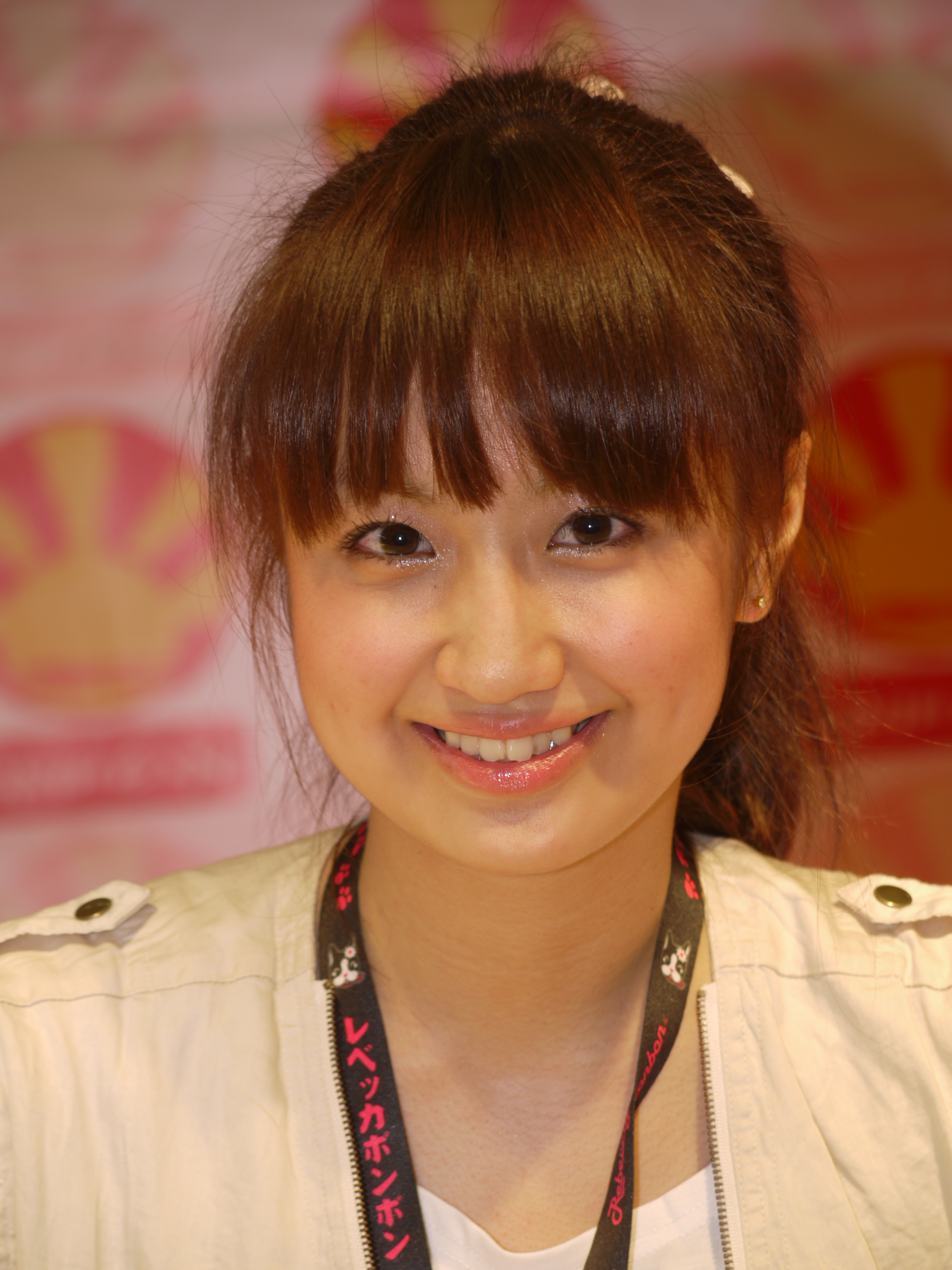
- Aso at Paris Japan Expo

Background information
- Born: August 6, 1990 (age 36)
- Origin: Tokyo, Japan
- Genres: J-pop
- Occupations: Musician, Actress
- Instruments: Vocals, Piano
- Label: Lantis
- Website: lantis.jp/artist/asonatsuko/

Natsuko Aso (麻生 夏子, Asō Natsuko) is a Japanese musician and actress.

== Biography ==
Aso began her career playing the role of Chisame in the Negima drama and as a member of the band pRythme. Later, she has appeared in a number of TV dramas and began a solo music career. Her single "Perfect Area Complete" was chosen as the opening song for the Baka to Test to Shōkanjū anime; the first of many to use her music. More recently she presented Japan In Motion, a show broadcast on the French TV network Nolife as well as Zip, a show broadcast on Japanese television.

In 2010 she ranked 18th on the domestic singles charts and toured Europe for the first time.

In 2011, she guest starred in Hyadain's Kakakata Kataomoi-C music video, where she played the role of Hyadain's female counterpart Hyadaruko. It currently stands at 21 million views on Youtube.

In 2012 she graduated university and was a guest at the London Hyper Japan event. She then performed in the United States for the first time at Otakon Music Festival in Baltimore with Faylan and JAM Project.

In 2014 she announced her retirement from musical performance to focus on other passions. Her legacy as a noteworthy anime singer and J-Pop star of the early 2010s can be seen in an extensive discography, which includes solo piano performance and numerous live concerts in Japan. These include Ani-Uta Kitakyushu, the Lantis Anniversary Show and appearances at Sunshine City. A recurring theme in her music videos is the use of bright rainbow colours and French motifs.

Her interests include baseball, piano, food, movies and video games; she has appeared at several gaming events and comicons including London and Toulouse Game Show.

== Filmography ==
=== Dramas ===
- Black Sun (Hiromi)
- Negima! Magister Negi Magi (Chisame Hasegawa)
- Saito (gyaru)
- The Tears Kiss (Meg)
- Cat Street (Misaki)
- Kamen Rider W (Himeka Yukimura)

=== Stage play ===
- Persona 4 The Ultimate in Mayonaka Arena Stageplay (Rise Kujikawa)

== Discography ==
=== Singles ===
1. "Brand-New World" released on May 27, 2009, Shin Mazinger Shōgeki! Z-Hen ending theme
2. "Programming For Non-Fiction" released on July 23, 2009, Yoku Wakaru Gendai Mahō opening theme, peak rank No. 83 at Oricon singles charts
3. "Perfect Area Complete!" released on January 27, 2010, Baka to Test to Shōkanjū opening theme, peak rank No. 18 at Oricon singles charts
4. "Everyday Sunshine Line!" released on May 12, 2010, Ichiban Ushiro no Daimaō ending theme, peak rank No. 72 at Oricon singles charts
5. "More-more Lovers!!" released on November 10, 2010, MM! ending theme
6. "Diamond Star" (ダイヤモンドスター☆) released on February 9, 2011, Cardfight!! Vanguard ending theme
7. "Ren'ai Kōjō Committee" (恋愛向上committee) released March 9, 2011, Baka to Test to Shōkanjū Matsuri opening theme
8. "Eureka Baby" (エウレカベイビー) released July 20, 2011, Baka to Test to Shōkanjū 2! ending theme
9. "Lovely Girls Anthem" released on February 8, 2012, Tantei Opera Milky Holmes 2 ending theme
10. "Fighting Growing Diary" released on July 25, 2012, Cardfight!! Vanguard Asia Circuit Hen ending theme
11. "Parade!" released on October 24, 2012, Ragnarok Online RWC2012 cheer song
12. "Never Ending Voyage" released on July 24, 2013.
13. "MoonRise Romance" released on November 27, 2013, Walkure Romanze ending theme

=== Albums ===
1. Movement of Magic released on August 4, 2010
2. Precious Tone released on October 26, 2011
3. My Starlit Point released on March 5, 2014
