= Demon King Daimao =

Japanese light novel series

- Cover of the first volume of Ichiban Ushiro no Dai Maō by Hobby Japan

いちばんうしろの大魔王 (Ichiban Ushiro no Dai Maō)
- Genre: Science Fantasy, harem
- Light novel
- Written by: Shōtarō Mizuki
- Illustrated by: Souichi Itō
- Published by: Hobby Japan
- English publisher: J-Novel Club
- Imprint: HJ Bunko
- Original run: February 1, 2008 – March 29, 2014
- Volumes: 13
- Manga
- Written by: Shōtarō Mizuki
- Illustrated by: Souichi Itō
- Published by: Akita Shoten
- Magazine: Champion Red
- Original run: September 19, 2008 – December 19, 2013
- Volumes: 5
- Anime television series
- Directed by: Takashi Watanabe
- Written by: Takao Yoshioka
- Music by: Tatsuya Kato
- Studio: Artland
- Licensed by: NA: Sentai Filmworks
- Original network: Tokyo MX, TV Saitama, Chiba TV, tvk, AT-X, Sun TV, TV Aichi
- English network: NA: Anime Network
- Original run: April 2, 2010 – June 18, 2010
- Episodes: 12
- icon

Ichiban Ushiro no Dai Maō (Japanese: いちばんうしろの大魔王; "The Great Demon King in the Back Row"), also known as Demon King Daimao, is a Japanese light novel series written by Shōtarō Mizuki and illustrated by Souichi Itō, published by Hobby Japan under their HJ Bunko imprint. The first volume was published on February 1, 2008, and was completed with a total of 13 volumes available on March 29, 2014. A manga adaptation began monthly serialization in the September 2008 issue of Akita Shoten's magazine Champion Red, and a 12-episode anime adaptation by Artland aired between April and June 2010 on Tokyo MX and other channels.

The light novels have sold 1.1 million print copies by February 2010.

== Plot summary ==
This story of "love, magic, and battles" revolves around Akuto Sai, a boy who aims to become part of his country's highest order of magicians and contribute to society as one of its clergy. On the day he's admitted into the Constant Magical Academy, his aptitude test predicts the following: "Future Occupation: Demon King." Thus begins his very severe and complicated school life in which he is resented by his studious female class head, desired by a girl with mysterious powers, and guarded by a beautiful female android.

== Characters ==
=== Main characters ===
Akuto Sai (紗伊 阿九斗, Sai Akuto)
Voiced by: Daisuke Ono (Drama CD), Takashi Kondou (Teen), Kaori Akashi (Child) (anime) (Japanese); Chris Patton (English)
Akuto, an orphan raised in a church-run orphanage, transfers to Constant Magic Academy, hoping to someday become a high priest for the benefit of society. However, upon arriving, Yatagarasu, the school's oracular spirit, announces that he will become the Demon King in the future. As a result, the entire student body becomes terrified and paranoid of him. Even so, he tries to do the right thing whenever a situation arises. Akuto has an incredible amount of power within him that sometimes gets out of control. Akuto has a highly serious personality but is not without some humor. In the manga, he's got a temper, which makes him unwilling to hold anything back whilst engaged in a fight, whilst in the anime, he tries to restrain himself in order to convince everyone that he has no desire to become the Demon King.
Also in the manga, he was depicted as a very good cook.

Despite his good-nature and wanting to make the world a better place, he does not ascribe to the world's religions, and even got in trouble when he was a child at a church-run orphanage for stating so.
Akuto is capable of controlling and manipulating "mana", a form of energy that resides in the bodies of living things as well as the surrounding environment. For instance, he is able to absorb the mana of a large demon dog, thus transforming it back into a normal puppy, a feat that has never been performed before. However, his immense power is also highly volatile and most of his early attempts at controlling mana to create magic spells, no matter how benign they're supposed to be, resulted in catastrophic explosions.

Theron Martin of Anime News Network describes Akuto's role in the series as "a case where the harem master is still basically a nice guy but also turns out to be his story's buffest and biggest bad-ass" and that "everything that Akuto says or does to prove that he is not a Demon King is instead misinterpreted in a way that only bolsters his image as a Demon King, including the way that he collects his harem, is a vastly amusing one which gets a lot of play throughout the series".
Junko Hattori (服部 絢子, Hattori Junko)
Voiced by: Ryoko Shiraishi (Drama CD), Yōko Hikasa (anime) (Japanese); Luci Christian (English)
Junko is a student of class 1-A and the class representative. She is a disciple of the god Suhara and a member of the Iga Ninja Clan. Her family of warriors have been charged with protecting the Empire for generations. She is very devoted to her samurai-like traditions and has a strong sense of justice. She meets Akuto on the train to the school, and forms a pact with him to make the world a better place. When she discovers that he is destined to become Demon King, she decides that it is in the best interest of society to destroy him, believing that he knew about his destiny and that he tricked her into becoming friends. She usually misinterprets his attempts at good deeds and intentions as evil wrongdoings. She begins to develop strong feelings for Akuto throughout the series after realizing his intentions, and at one point didn't mind the thought of being married to him. Her power is mostly based around the sword that she carries with her at all times. According to Kena Soga, Junko is Akuto's best friend, and according to Korone, Junko and Akuto should get married. Her goal is to serve the nation as a member of its fighting force. In the anime (and to some extent in the manga) she is portrayed as having tsundere tendencies. Her family name is taken from the famous samurai Hanzo Hattori.
Kena Soga (曽我 けーな, Soga Kena)
Voiced by: Mai Nakahara (Drama CD), Aki Toyosaki (anime) (Japanese); Melissa Davis (English)
Kena is one of Akuto's classmates in classroom 1-A who is always seen wearing a bird-shaped hairpin, later revealed to be a gift from Akuto when they were both children at the orphanage. She can make herself invisible to the point of having her own mana cloaked, although this applies only to her body; the hairpin and any other clothes she is wearing remain visible, meaning she must strip naked to fully conceal herself. A running gag is that whenever she is frightened, her first instinct is to turn invisible and strip, then she later gets caught naked after she stops concentrating and the invisibility wears off. Aside from near-complete invisibility and flight, Kena does not seem to exhibit other magic abilities. She is a highly capable student, but frequently absent from class, a point that annoys Akuto to no end. She loves rice and keeps a rice cooker even though rice cookers are banned from her dorm, as she believes that everyone would be happy if they ate rice together. Kena is often quite nonsensical, often acting based on unlikely and bizarre conclusions. For example, she once believed that she was responsible for killing Junko in a magical explosion, despite it originating from Akuto and Junko only being rendered unconscious. She refers to Akuto as "Aa-chan" and is not ashamed to express her affections for him.
Korone (ころね)
Voiced by: Minori Chihara (Drama CD), Aoi Yūki (anime) (Japanese); Maggie Flecknoe (English)
Korone is a green-haired Surveillance Agent sent by the government to observe Akuto 24/7. She is a Liradan/L'Isle-Adam (リラダン, Riradan), a race of androids. She is usually emotionless and stolid, but occasionally curious when it comes to certain things. However, she does display human characteristics on occasion; particularly, she enjoys teasing Akuto, often casually mentioning or doing perverted things in front of him to get a response. She sleeps in a small storage closet in Akuto's dorm room, and has numerous firearms and other items stored inside her handbag, a sort of hammerspace. Korone has the ability to read other people's emotions, and can detect an individual's presence based on mana emitted by that person's body. She, like all Liradans, can be temporarily deactivated by pulling her tail (in her case, a rabbit's) like the string on a talking doll. She can be reactivated after her tail is pulled again, but loses her short-term memory of events before the deactivation. Despite her emotionless demeanor, Korone seems to have feelings for Akuto, displaying a visible emotion of sadness when Akuto scolds her after being ordered by the higher-ups to seduce him.
Hiroshi Miwa (三輪 寛, Miwa Hiroshi)
Voiced by: Yūta Kasuya (Drama CD), Tsubasa Yonaga (anime) (Japanese); Greg Ayres (English)
Hiroshi is Akuto's self-described minion much to Akuto's dismay. A boy of shorter-than-average stature, he is frequently and savagely bullied by other students, and sees Akuto as his protector. Hiroshi does not get bullied in the anime, but is taken as a hostage once. His desire to become Akuto's servant began when Akuto gave a speech in class, although its debatably anarchistic climax terrified the rest of the class. Despite looking up to Akuto, he believes him to actually be evil and often misinterprets his intentions, giving counterproductive advice as a result.
Later on in the series, he is revealed to have been predicted by the Yatagarasu to become a hero in the future, and so he acquires the AI unit D13 (Voiced by: Kaori Akashi (Japanese), Shannon Emerick (English)) and uses it to transform into the legendary hero known as Brave (ブレイブ, Bureibu) after pulling out the sword in the cave in his hometown. As Brave, he has access to numerous weapons such as lasers, energy blades, and plasma guns. He keeps his identity as Brave a secret from the others. He is also a big fan of the idol Yuri Hoshino, who he later saves and becomes acquainted with. He also falls in love with Yuri after she kisses him as a reward for saving her.

In the anime, Hiroshi immediately latches onto Akuto as a "big brother" upon meeting him in class while in the manga, Hiroshi only makes the association after Akuto saved him from bullies.
Fujiko Eto (江藤 不二子, Etō Fujiko)
Voiced by: Yuki Makishima (1st Drama CD), Ayahi Takagaki (2nd Drama CD), Shizuka Itō (anime) (Japanese); Shelley Calene-Black (English) (Note: The initial English dub cast announcements by The Anime Network show the joke pseudonym Eileen Dover to be the voice of Fujiko Eto, but the closing credits for the English dub show Shelley Calene-Black.)
Fujiko Eto is the head of the girl's dorms at Constant Academy, and one of the few people early in the series who sympathizes with Akuto and his situation. In the manga, she is a second-year and a leader of the discipline committee. She became the head of the Eto family after her older brother died. However, she keeps in contact with him via his reanimated head which she keeps in a fluid-filled jar, and which has lost part of his memory. In the anime, her brother was killed by an unknown power on a mission (he was killed by Boichiro), while in the manga, he was executed for failing the mission. She plans to use Akuto's demon powers, once he becomes Demon King, for her own purposes. Despite her intentions of becoming the Demon Queen for its own sake, she is very attracted to Akuto and realizes she is in love with him, or at least lust, given her sexual actions in the anime. Her magical powers are mostly based around the use of chemicals and potions, which she throws around like grenades. She also uses a whip and develops the ability to control some of the demon beasts. She has a research lab that she hides away in.

=== Supporting characters ===
Mitsuko Tori (鳥井 美津子, Torii Mitsuko)
Voiced by: Chiaki Takahashi (Japanese); Rozie Curtis (English)
Mitsuko Tori is the Magic Academy's school nurse, and the homeroom teacher for Class 1-A. Upon learning of Akuto's future occupation as Demon King, she hopes that when Akuto dies, she can turn Akuto into a zombie and so she can perform research on him. She is a bit too open about this plan, much to Akuto's discomfort. In the manga, it was stated that she was a prodigy at age 10, but Akuto's raw power he displayed on his first day surpasses hers. She cast a mana barrier in the opening episode when Akuto almost blew up the classroom.
Lily Shiraishi (リリィ 白石, Riryi Shiraishi)
Voiced by: Akemi Kanda (Drama CD), Ryō Hirohashi (anime) (Japanese); Hilary Haag (English)
Lily is the Student Council President of Constant Magic Academy. She is always seen wearing a pointed witch's hat that has a face on it. Her hat occasionally talks. Despite her petite appearance, Lily is a capable fighter and mage; her powers include extending her arms to conduct devastating punches. In the anime, like the other girls, Lily also develops feelings for Akuto. She even kisses Akuto on the lips after he defeats Peterhausen. While Lily often prevents the government from acting against Akuto, she has also stated that she will kill him if he fulfills his destiny as the Demon King and tries to destroy society. In the manga, she initially challenges and defeats Akuto, and makes him train at her house while the other girls serve as maids, but in the anime and light novel, she is much kinder and only hits him when she needs to get a point across. She also has a brutal side, which is apparent when she beat up the Iga and Koga Ninja Clans in Episode 11.
Michie Otake (大竹 美智恵, Ōtake Michie)
Voiced by: Ayana Taketatsu (Japanese); Shannon Emerick (English)
Michie is the Student Council Vice President of Constant Magic Academy, who is frequently seen wearing a long black-and-red cape. She uses magic to control a large swarm of bats, and is seen using it on several occasions in battle and as rapid transportation. She occasionally uses different Japanese dialects when she speaks; sometimes several within the same sentence which some of the other characters have observed or commented on.
Kanna Kamiyama (神山 カンナ, Kamiyama Kanna)
Voiced by: Kaoru Mizuhara (Japanese); Brittney Karbowski (English)
Kanna is the treasurer of the Student Council who is seen frequently in the company of her friends in the Student Council, including the President and Vice President. Her magic ability is transforming into a giant wolf and uses this form to slice her enemies apart.
Arnoul (アルヌール, Arunūru)
Voiced by: Minako Kotobuki (Japanese); Margaret Fawcett (English)
The secretary of the Student Council, and is always seen in the company of the other Student Council members. She uses a mech in battle. Apparently, she only mutters a made-up word "Guga" in conversation. In the anime, Arnoul speaks for the first time in the final episode. In the light novel and the manga, it is revealed that she is also a Liradan, and that "Guga" is encrypted speech.

=== Antagonists ===
Eiko Teruya (照屋 栄子, Teruya Eiko)
Voiced by: Satomi Satō (Drama CD), Haruka Tomatsu (anime) (Japanese); Stephanie Wittels (English)
Eiko is a member of the Kōga Ninja Clan and is also a Suharist like Junko, her main rival. She has green-hair in a long ponytail. Mysterious and seductive, she has a habit of appearing seemingly from nowhere, then disappearing just as quickly. She often flirts with Akuto, but grows an intense dislike for him when he rejects her. She has a lust for power and tried to assassinate her father to become the new head of the clan, leading an alliance between Teruya and Hattori's Iga Ninja Clan against Akuto and his magic beasts. Throughout the final battle, Eiko attempts to rid herself of both the student council president, who knows she lied about her father dying to Akuto, and her rivals the Hattori sisters, but fails, and in the end is confronted by Junko, who tries to kill her. However, Korone suddenly appears and stops Junko from delivering the killing blow, allowing Eiko to run, until she runs into her father, who turned out to have survived her attack. When she asks how he survived, her now-cybernetic father says he couldn't allow himself to die knowing he raised his daughter wrong. Eiko falls to her knees in shame as Korone tells Junko the Teruya heiress must live so she can atone for her sins.
Boichiro Yamato (大和 望一郎, Yamato Bōichirō)
Voiced by: Tarusuke Shingaki (Japanese); Leraldo Anzaldua (English)
A leader in the Cabinet Intelligence Magic Office (CIMO8). He seems to be connected to past events involving the previous Demon King and Constant Magic Academy's dean. His abilities include wielding a dimensional blade that he uses to slices through his opponents as well as allowing him to teleport. He is also very interested in Kena (because she resembles Boichiro's lover, Rimu), even claiming to have given her the bird hairpin that she wears.
Mr. X (ミスターX, Misutā Ekkusu)
Voiced by: Haruo Satō (Japanese); Jovan Jackson (English)
A perverted member of CIMO8, he uses a sea cucumber as his demon beast. He wears a cape that is capable of nullifying magical abilities and mana-based attacks. He sexually abuses Hiroshi's sister, Yukiko, and Kena, and attempts to do the same to Junko. As a result, he's severely beaten by Korone.
2V (ツーブイ, Tsū Bui)
Voiced by: Tomoyuki Higuchi (Japanese); Barton Wentworth (English)
A member of CIMO8 who advises Eizo Teruya on how best to fight the Demon King and his demon beasts. Her ability is the manipulation of puppets, which she uses as stand-ins for herself at all times – mostly in the form of businessmen. Consequently, her true appearance is unknown. On occasion she can animate puppets that can produce their own mana. 2V is a male in the anime whilst in the manga she's the empress's twin sister.

=== Other characters ===
Yatagarasu
Voiced by: Tetsu Shiratori (Japanese); Rob Mungle (English)
A crow kept by the Academy to make a quick assessment of a student's health, and to make a prediction on their future occupations. It acts much like the Sorting Hat from Harry Potter. He immediately considers Akuto's occupation to be the Demon King.
Peterhausen (ピーターハウゼン, Pītāhauzen)
Voiced by: Kazuya Nakai (Drama CD), Jōji Nakata (anime) (Japanese); Andy McAvin (English)
A massive dragon who belonged to the previous Demon King. He is woken up by Fujiko, and is later defeated by Akuto, who becomes his new master. Peterhausen sacrifices himself in the final episode in order to relieve Akuto's status as the Demon King.
Yukiko Miwa
Voiced by: Sayuri Yahagi (anime) (Japanese); Brittney Karbowski (English)
Yukiko is Hiroshi's younger sister who was sexually abused by Mr X. She strongly believes that Hiroshi is a hero even though her older brother denies his responsibilities.
Rimu
Voiced by: Brittney Karbowski (English)
Rimu was Boichiro's lover. She looks exactly the same as Kena; the only difference being hair color (Rimu's hair was yellow whilst Kena's hair is red). She was captivated by the previous Demon King which traumatized Boichiro, leading him to make an attempt to control Suhara's (God) powers to bring Rimu back. Rimu and Kena meet in the final episode of the anime, in which she helps Kena to relieve Akuto's status as the Demon King.
Yuko Hattori (服部 ゆう子, Hattori Yūko) / Yuri Hoshino (星野 ゆり, Hoshino Yuri)
Voiced by: Yuka Iguchi (Japanese); Jessica Boone (English)
Junko's younger sister who lives a double life as both the popular teen idol, Yuri Hoshino, and a Hattori ninja. She was bitten by a demon beast in her younger years, and bears a scar on the left side of her neck. The scar reacts whenever she is near a demon beast, causing her pain. Despite this, she is very eager to beat them up whenever she encounters one. When the hero, Brave saves her from a demon beast, Yuri falls in love and kisses him on the lips.
Keizo Teruya
Voiced by: Kotaro Nakamura (Japanese); Garson Keller (English)
Eiko's father and head of the Teruya family, as well as the leader of the Kōga Ninja Clan. In the anime, he orders an assassination attempt on Kena, but was critically wounded by Boichiro. Eiko attempts to seize the opportunity by murdering her father, but Keizo survives the attack.
Yozo Hattori
Voiced by: Atsushi Ono (Japanese); David Matranga (English)
Yozo is Junko's father who approved of his daughter's arranged marriage with Akuto. He is also a long term rival of Keizo.

== Media ==
=== Light Novel ===
The first volume was published on February 1, 2008, by Hobby Japan under its HJ Bunko imprint, with a total of 13 volumes available. Volumes in the series are referred to as Acts. Light novel publisher J-Novel Club released the light novels in English digitally.

No.	Title	Original release date	English release date
1	Maō ni Nanka Naritakunai! (魔王になんかなりたくない！)	February 1, 2008; 978-4-89425-660-6	July 02, 2017; 978-1-71830-078-1
2	Gakuen ni Kakusa Reta Himitsu ni Idomu! (学園に隠された秘密に挑む！)	May 1, 2008; 978-4-89425-703-0	August 28, 2017; 978-1-71830-080-4
3	Dokitsu! Mizugi Matsuri no Rinkai Gakkō-hen!! (どきっ！ 水着祭りの臨海学校編!!)	September 1, 2008; 978-4-89425-759-7	November 02, 2017; 978-1-71830-082-8
4	Maō no Chikara ga Tsuini Kakusei Suru! (魔王の力がついに覚醒する！)	December 1, 2008; 978-4-89425-794-8	March 31, 2018; 978-1-71830-084-2
5	Maō Akuto wa Kami o Korosu Koto ga Dekiru no ka!? (魔王・阿九斗は神を殺すことができるのか!?)	March 1, 2009; 978-4-89425-830-3	June 02, 2018; 978-1-71830-086-6
6	Nazo ni Michita Tenkōsei Kēna no Shōtai wa!? (謎に満ちた転校生ケーナの正体は!?)	June 30, 2009; 978-4-89425-882-2	July 21, 2018; 978-1-71830-088-0
7	Akuto to o Neratta Inbō ga Gakuin Subete o Nomikomu!! (阿九斗を狙った陰謀が学院全てを飲み込む!!)	September 1, 2009; 978-4-89425-929-4	September 24, 2018; 978-1-71830-090-3
8	Maō VS Maō!? (魔王VS魔王!?)	December 1, 2009; 978-4-89425-966-9	November 09, 2018; 978-1-71830-092-7
9	Saikyō no Kōtei ni Idomu, Maō Akuto no Tatakai no Yukue wa!? (最強の皇帝に挑む、魔王・阿九斗の闘いの行方は!?)	April 1, 2010; 978-4-79860-029-1	January 19, 2019; 978-1-71830-094-1
10	Kōtei ni Natta ke ̄Naga Sassoku dai Bōsō!? (皇帝になったけーなが早速大暴走!?)	July 1, 2010; 978-4-79860-077-2	March 22, 2019; 978-1-71830-096-5
11	Kōi Sōdatsu-sen Boppatsu!? (皇位争奪戦勃発!?)	December 1, 2010; 978-4-79860-150-2	June 01, 2019; 978-1-71830-099-6
12	Kono Sekainohate ni Aru Mono to wa? (この世界の果てにある物とは？)	September 29, 2012; 978-4-79860-460-2	August 04, 2019; 978-1-71830-100-9
13	Soshite `Monogatari' wa Shinjitsu ni Itaru ――. (そして「物語」は真実に至る――。)	March 29, 2014; 978-4-79860-799-3	October 13, 2019; 978-1-71830-102-3

=== Manga ===
A manga adaptation began serialization in the November 2008 issue of Champion Red. The series ended in the February 2014 issue of Champion Red. The first volume was published by Akita Shoten on May 20, 2009, and the fifth and last on April 18, 2014.

No.	Japanese release date	Japanese ISBN
1	May 20, 2009	978-4-253-23466-5
2	March 19, 2010	978-4-253-23467-2
3	May 20, 2011	978-4-253-23468-9
4	April 20, 2012	978-4-253-23469-6
5	April 18, 2014	978-4-253-23470-2

=== Drama CD ===
Two drama CDs produced by Edge Records were released. The first drama CD was released on February 25, 2009, and the second on September 30, 2009.

=== Anime ===
An anime adaptation of the first 5 novel volumes produced by Artland and directed by Takashi Watanabe broadcast on Tokyo MX between April 3, 2010, to June 18, 2010, with subsequent broadcasts on Chiba TV, TV Kanagawa, AT-X, Sun TV, TV Aichi, Nico Nico Channel, and ShowTime, Inc. The series aired uncensored on AT-X, while it was heavily censored on other networks. Six DVD and Blu-ray Disc volumes were released by Marvelous Entertainment between June 25 and November 25, 2010, each containing an original video animation called Another Great Demon King's Omake (もひとつおまけの大魔王, Mo Hitosu Omake no Dai Maō). Simulcasts of the series are provided by Crunchyroll and Anime Network on its video website. The series also became part of Anime Network's Video On Demand service starting October 21, 2010. The opening theme is "REALOVE:REALIFE" by female Japanese pop group Sphere, while the ending theme is "Everyday Sunshine Line!" by Natsuko Aso. The series is licensed in North America by Sentai Filmworks under the title Demon King Daimao, and Section23 Films released the complete series with an English dub (provided by Seraphim Digital) on Blu-ray and DVD on June 14, 2011.
