= Mianne Bagger =

Professional golfer

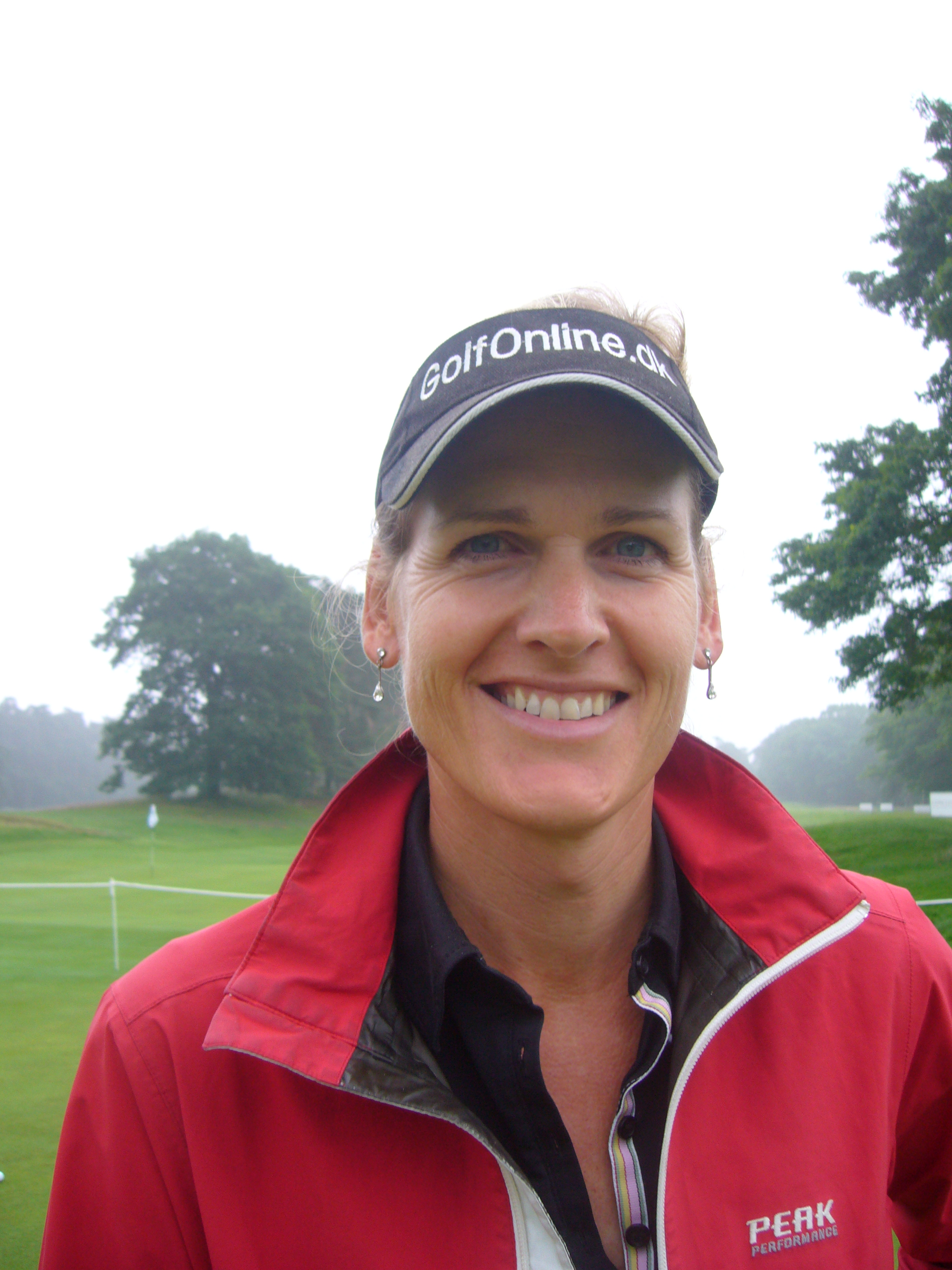
- Mianne Bagger in 2008

Personal information
- Full name: Mianne Bagger
- Nationality: Denmark
- Born: 25 December 1966 (age 59) Copenhagen, Denmark
- Height: 1.76 m (5 ft 9 in)

Career
- Sport: Golf
- Turned professional: 2003
- Current tours: ALPG Tour (joined 2004); Ladies European Tour (joined 2005)

Achievements and awards
- Vardon Trophy: 2001

Mianne Bagger (born 25 December 1966) is a professional golfer from Denmark. In 2004, by playing in the Women's Australian Open, she became the first openly transitioned woman to play in a professional golf tournament. She also became the first trans woman to qualify for the Ladies European Tour in 2004, and the first high-profile transitioned woman to qualify for a professional sports tour since Renee Richards joined the Women's Tennis Association tour during the 1970s.

She has been instrumental in gaining eligibility for transitioned women to compete on professional golf tours. Through her efforts, many professional golf organizations have amended their practices, but the policies generally still constrict rules of gender variance, and view atypically gendered women as something other than women. Bagger has sought to remove gender policies, specifically female-at-birth, as more problematic than helpful, and encourage sports organizations to see "a fuller understanding and acceptance of gender variance and human diversity."

== Early life and amateur career ==
Bagger was born in Copenhagen, Denmark, on 25 December 1966. She took up golf at the age of eight. At the age of 14, she was pictured with golfer Greg Norman during a golf clinic. Bagger moved with her family to Australia in 1979. In 1992 she started hormone replacement therapy, and in 1995 had sex reassignment surgery. In 1998 she returned to competitive golf as an amateur in Australia. She was open about her life and played in various amateur events around Adelaide and was invited to join the women's South Australian State Squad. After winning the 1999 South Australian State Amateur the media attention increased.

Bagger played for the state team of South Australia (1999–2002) achieving a national top-ten rank for amateur women. She described facing suspicion from various players concerned about physiological unfairness: "they would still just say that if I happen to do well or win a tournament, that it was because of an unfair advantage." She had researched the issues herself and, also through personal experience, believed that concerns were unfounded. All organizations that prevented her from competing had never actually done any research but had merely adopted a blanket ruling without question. Bagger answered that many people are not aware of physiological aspects of gender variant conditions and the issues related to transitioning. Bagger again won the South Australian Amateur in 2001 and 2002.

Bagger felt she had taken her amateur career as far as it could go and was looking to turn professional. She found that rules would prevent her from competing professionally in Australia and "on most golf tours around the world." While still an amateur, she was offered the chance to play in the 2004 Women's Australian Open. This led to a front-page story in Sydney, which prompted Bagger to hold a news conference the day before the tournament to answer questions and present information on transitioned and transgender people.

== Professional career and campaigning for trans rights ==
After becoming the 6th best player in Australia in 2003, she turned a professional golfer.

- In 2004 she played the Swedish Telia Tour and finished twice in the top 10.
- In 2005 she played her first tournament on the Ladies European Tour. She finished in the 35th place
- In 2006 she finished on the 91st place
- In 2007 she finished as 54th

Her coach is Australian Andrew Mowatt at the Royal Fremantle Golf Club in Perth.

At Bagger's first tournament as a professional, Laura Davies and Rachel Teske were among players who were happy to allow Bagger to compete. Bagger caused a media stir in 2004 when she played the Australia Women's Open and had intentions also of joining the Australian Ladies Professional Golf Tour (ALPG Tour). At a tournament in the United States, she met Ty Votaw, the commissioner of the LPGA Tour, who was later questioned about their policies stating "right now, our rule is that they have to be born women." Bagger notes that "they obviously don't consider that I meet that condition." Votaw left the possibility open for that rule to change in the future.

The 2004 ruling by the International Olympic Committee (IOC) regarding transitioned athletes led to a re-examination of rules in many sports. The IOC 2004 Stockholm Consensus, which researchers have criticized as "a measure that polices the traditional gender binary while being disguised as a progressive and inclusive measure," spells out specific requirements for a transitioned athlete. Bagger notes that the USGA policy requires "a signed waiver by the entrant giving complete and unrestricted access to one's medical records and pre-operative and post-operative psychiatric records" – requirements that are unheard of for other competitors.

In September 2004, after continued lobbying by Bagger, the Ladies European Tour voted on amending their membership entry criteria, allowing Bagger to compete on tour. Later that year, the ALPG also voted in favour of changing their constitution to remove the 'female at birth' clause, thus making Bagger eligible to join the ALPG Tour in Australia. On 9 February 2005, the Ladies Golf Union also announced a policy change allowing Bagger to compete in the Women's British Open. On 21 March 2005, the United States Golf Association announced it adopted a new 'gender policy' that allows transitioned athletes to compete in USGA golf championships, including the upcoming U.S. Women's Open. In 2010, the LPGA amended their bylaws and removed the "female at birth" entry condition. Although the various policy changes have enabled transitioned athletes to compete, the policies remain under review. Bagger, along with a few high-profile athletes and a growing number of medical professionals and researchers around the world, continue to lobby the IOC, IAAF, WADA et al. in their approach to embracing transitioned athletes. Bagger also shares that many of these decisions are made by popular vote of members, often professionals in their sport, who are not doctors or medical professionals, and have no relevant medical training.

== Amateur wins ==
- 1999 South Australian Ladies Amateur
- 2000 South Australian Business Women's Championship
- 2001 South Australian Ladies Amateur, South Australian 72 Hole Strokeplay Championship (Rene Erichsen Trophy)
- 2002 South Australian Ladies Amateur

== See also ==
- "There's Something About Marrying", the tenth episode of the sixteenth season of The Simpsons, in which Bagger is parodied as Patty Bouvier's fiancée Leslie Robin "Veronica" Swisher (voiced by Tress MacNeille)
- Transgender people in sports
- Sex verification in sports
