= There's Something About Marrying =

- The Simpsons episode
- Episode no.: Season 16; Episode 10
- Directed by: Nancy Kruse
- Written by: J. Stewart Burns
- Production code: GABF04
- Original air date: February 20, 2005

Guest appearances
- Tress MacNeille as Veronica; Karl Wiedergott as Howell Huser

Episode features
- Couch gag: The family, dressed as bruised and beaten hockey players, skates around the living room holding the Stanley Cup.
- Commentary: Al Jean; J. Stewart Burns; Matt Selman; Michael Price; Joel H. Cohen; Tom Gammill; Max Pross; Jeff Westbrook; David Silverman

Episode chronology
← Previous "Pranksta Rap"	Next → "On a Clear Day I Can't See My Sister"
- The Simpsons season 16

"There's Something About Marrying" is the tenth episode of the sixteenth season of the American animated television series The Simpsons. In the episode, Springfield legalizes same-sex marriage to increase tourism. After becoming a minister, Homer starts to wed people to make money. Meanwhile, Marge's sister Patty comes out as a lesbian and reveals she is going to marry a woman named Veronica. The episode title is a play on the Farrelly brothers' 1998 romantic comedy There's Something About Mary.

This was the third time that an episode of The Simpsons focused on homosexuality. The episode—written by J. Stewart Burns and directed by Nancy Kruse—was inspired by the 2004 same-sex weddings that occurred in San Francisco. According to executive producer Al Jean, the staff wanted the episode to explore what the different characters' stances on same-sex marriage were. Around the time of the episode's original airdate, February 20, 2005, the same-sex marriage question was a controversial political issue in the United States and the episode became controversial, leading to the episode receiving criticism from numerous conservative groups, including the Parents Television Council and the American Family Association. Positive reaction to the episode came from, among others, the Gay & Lesbian Alliance Against Defamation and the gay-oriented website AfterEllen, with negative reception to the episode from, amongst others, the Gay and Lesbian Alliance Against Defamation and the gay-oriented website LGBTQ Nation, who criticised the depiction of Veronica (a parody of trans pro golfer Mianne Bagger) as transphobic.

During the first airing, 10.5 million people watched "There's Something About Marrying" and it became the highest-rated episode of the season. The episode had received a lot of publicity in the media before its broadcast—not only because of the same-sex marriage controversy but also because of Patty's outing. It was revealed in July 2004 that a character would come out as gay in the episode, leading to much speculation from fans and the press. Bookmaker websites were even posting odds on which character it would be, with Patty receiving the best odds.

== Plot ==
Bart and Milhouse torment a tourist named Howell Huser (a parody of television personality Huell Howser), who is then chased out of town by bullies Dolph, Jimbo, and Kearney. Huser is later revealed to be a media personality, and he appears on a network's morning television show warning tourists against visiting Springfield, causing the Springfield tourism business to collapse. Mayor Quimby holds an emergency meeting at the town hall to solve the problem, and after many senseless suggestions, Lisa suggests that Springfield legalize same-sex marriage to entice visitors to their town. All of Springfield happily agrees with Lisa's idea, and the town makes a commercial that is broadcast throughout America, convincing hundreds of homosexual couples to come to Springfield. However, Reverend Lovejoy insists that the Bible forbids same-sex marriage and refuses to marry any gay couples. Homer, upon learning that ministers are paid $200 per couple, abandons his own indifference to the process and becomes a minister himself with help from the online "e-Piscopal" Church, whereupon he marries every gay couple in town and who arrive to the town specifically to get married.

Meanwhile, at the Simpson family's home, Patty comes out as a lesbian, saying that she is in love with a pro golfer named Veronica (a parody of trans pro golfer Mianne Bagger) and asking Homer to marry them. While Homer immediately accepts Patty's sexuality (briefly improving their relationship), an uncomfortable Marge reprimands her for having not told their family and insists that Patty marry a man. Patty is angered and calls Marge out for being a hypocrite in acting liberal about the issues except when it applies to her own family, pointing out that she cannot accept their family's sexuality for what it is. Before the wedding, Marge accidentally discovers Veronica is actually male. She decides to keep quiet about it since Patty will be marrying a man.

During the wedding ceremony, Marge becomes especially touched by Patty's heartfelt declaration of love for Veronica. This prompts Marge to disclose Veronica's actual gender in front of the whole wedding assembly, much to Patty's horror. Veronica reveals their legal name to be “Leslie Robin Swisher”: having initially been cross-dressing as a woman to get onto the LPGA golf tour, before deciding to live as a woman permanently on meeting and falling in mutual love at first sight with Patty there, so that they could be together. After asking Patty whether she still wants to get married on knowing the truth, Patty replies "Hell no – I like girls!", to applause from the congregation.

Afterwards, Marge reconciles with Patty after telling her that she has learned a lesson and has accepted the fact that Patty is a lesbian. In a meta-reference to the show's tendency to episodically return to status quo ante, Lisa notes that this is the end of Homer's wedding business. When Bart asks, "Why?", Lisa shrugs her shoulders and makes a non-committal noise.

Patty and her other sister, Selma, then go to leave a bag at the airport unattended, as a way to meet security personnel they can date.

== Production ==
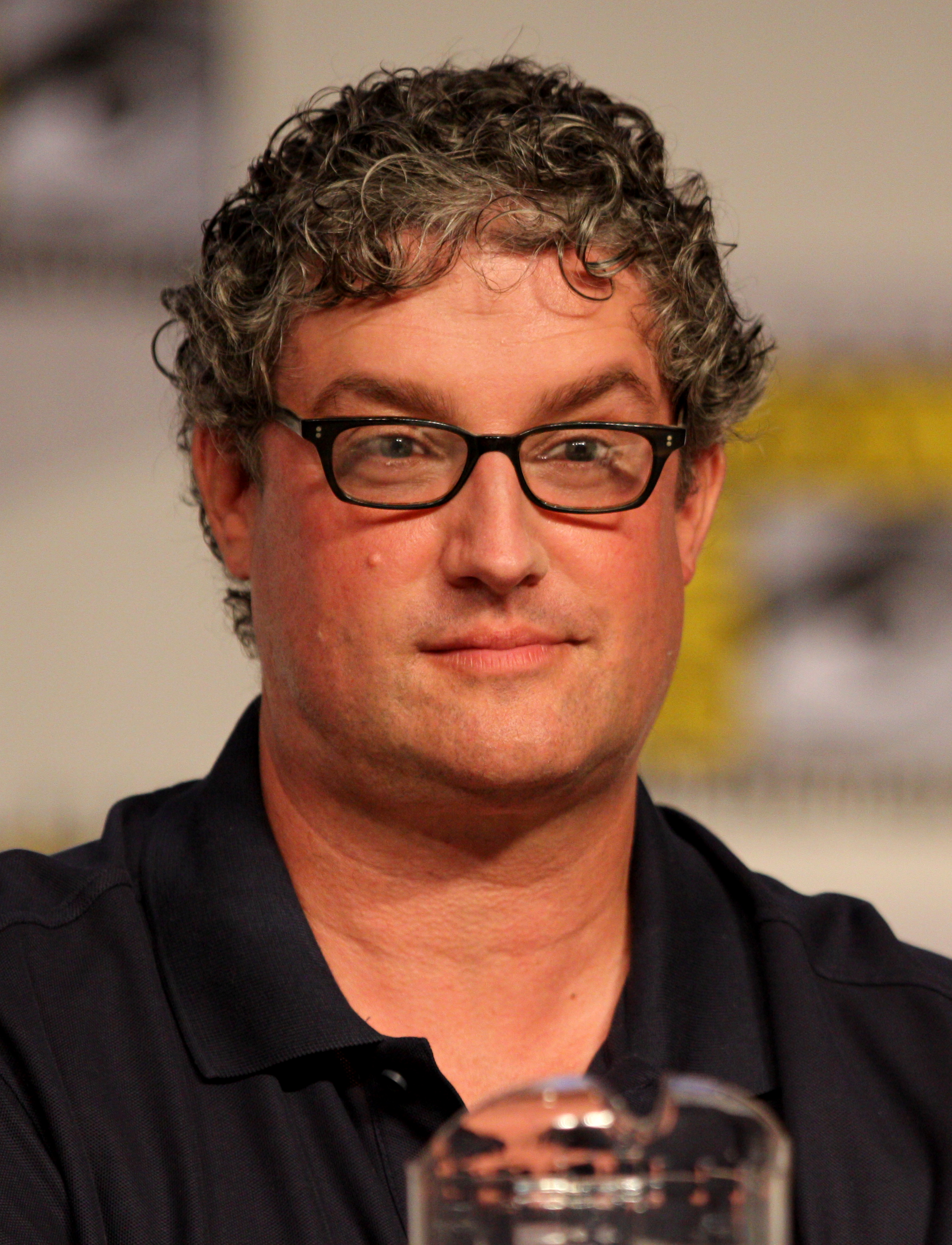
Al Jean said the staff wanted to explore the characters' different positions on same-sex marriage.

"There's Something About Marrying" was written by co-executive producer J. Stewart Burns and directed by Nancy Kruse as part of the sixteenth season of The Simpsons. Work on the episode started in March 2004, after the 2004 San Francisco same-sex weddings, a period during February 2004 when the city was issuing marriage licenses to same-sex couples. This served as The Simpsons staff's inspiration for "There's Something About Marrying". The plot point where Springfield tries to increase tourism by marketing towards the LGBT community also had a basis in reality. An example is Fort Lauderdale, which became a popular tourist destination for gays and lesbians in the mid-2000s. Executive producer Al Jean said they were interested in doing the episode because they could explore the various characters' different positions on gay marriage while remaining neutral. "Lisa thinks it's good for civil rights. The reverend of the local Protestant church is opposed to it. Other people think tourists will come to town. Mayor Quimby wants the money. We don't take a position as much as explore everybody's positions," he commented.

Matt Groening, the creator of The Simpsons, stated that the staff wanted to out Patty as gay because portraying her as a "love-starved spinster [...] seemed old" on the show. There had previously been hints about Patty's orientation. For example, in the season thirteen episode "Jaws Wired Shut" she is part of the Springfield Gay Pride Parade's "stayin' in the closet" float, though only her voice was heard and she was not seen.

== Themes and analysis ==
The episode's plotline revolves around homosexuality—the third time for The Simpsons. The first was season eight's "Homer's Phobia", and the second was "Three Gays of the Condo" from season fourteen, both of which won Primetime Emmy Awards for Outstanding Animated Program. This time it centered on the right for homosexuals to get married and the coming-out of a character. In the episode, Homer is shown as being tolerant with homosexuality, in contrast with "Homer's Phobia", in which he was initially portrayed as being strongly (and literally) homophobic. In that episode, the Simpson family gets a new friend that Homer dissociates himself from after finding out that he is gay. He also fears that the friend will have a negative influence on Bart and decides to ensure Bart's heterosexuality by taking him to do manly things such as hunting. As James Delingpole of The Daily Telegraph writes, it was first after "Homer's Phobia" that Homer began to be portrayed as enlightened about homosexuality. Marge, on the other hand, who had previously been portrayed as supportive of gay people on the show, is seen as disapproving of her sister's sexual orientation.

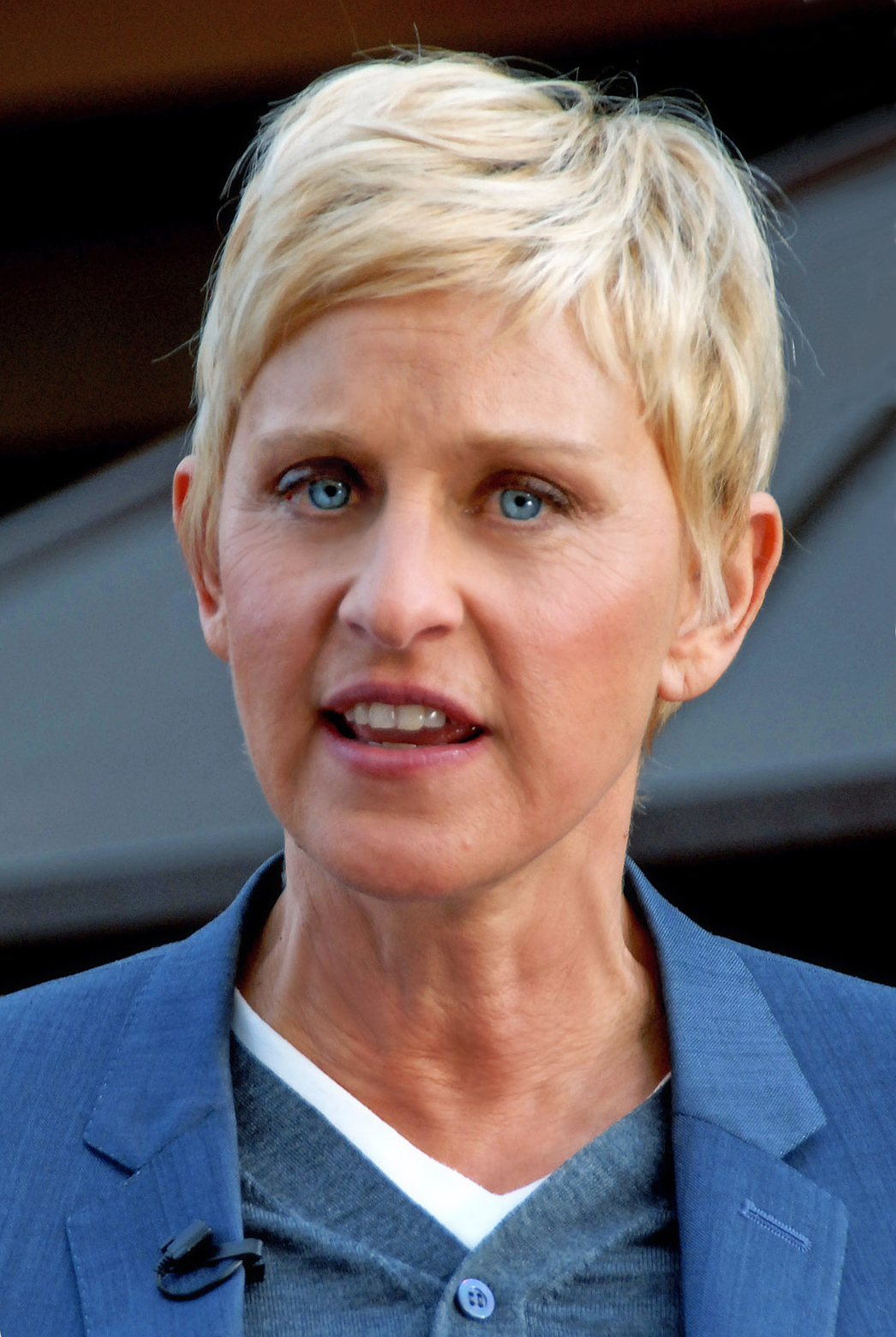
The coming-out of Ellen DeGeneres' character in Ellen led to the appearance of more gay characters on television.

According to the publication Zeek: A Jewish Journal of Thought and Culture and Value War: Public Opinion and the Politics of Gay Rights, it was the controversial lesbian outing of the main character (played by Ellen DeGeneres) in the sitcom Ellen in 1997 that paved the way for Patty's coming-out in this episode, as well as for many other gay characters on other television shows. In his book Queers in American Popular Culture, Jim Elledge noted that unlike many episodes of The Simpsons that go through a situation and then everything returns to normal during the ending, this one does not. He commented that the staff of the show could have made Patty heterosexual again at the end of the episode and leave it how it was before by having her marry Leslie. Instead, they ended it in a way that could potentially be experienced as distasteful to the heteronormative audience by having Patty exclaim "Hell no! I like girls!" to Leslie's marriage proposal. The author also noted that it is possible the Simpsons staff chose Patty to come out as gay instead of a male character because lesbians were "traditionally considered more acceptable" on television. She did, however, not "adhere to the eroticized male lesbian fantasy or fit into the loveable, asexual guise of the comedy lesbian" that had previously been seen on shows such as Ellen. Instead, Patty is "rude, crude, and not ashamed of declaring her sexual preferences", and this could make her unpalatable to some viewers, according to Elledge.

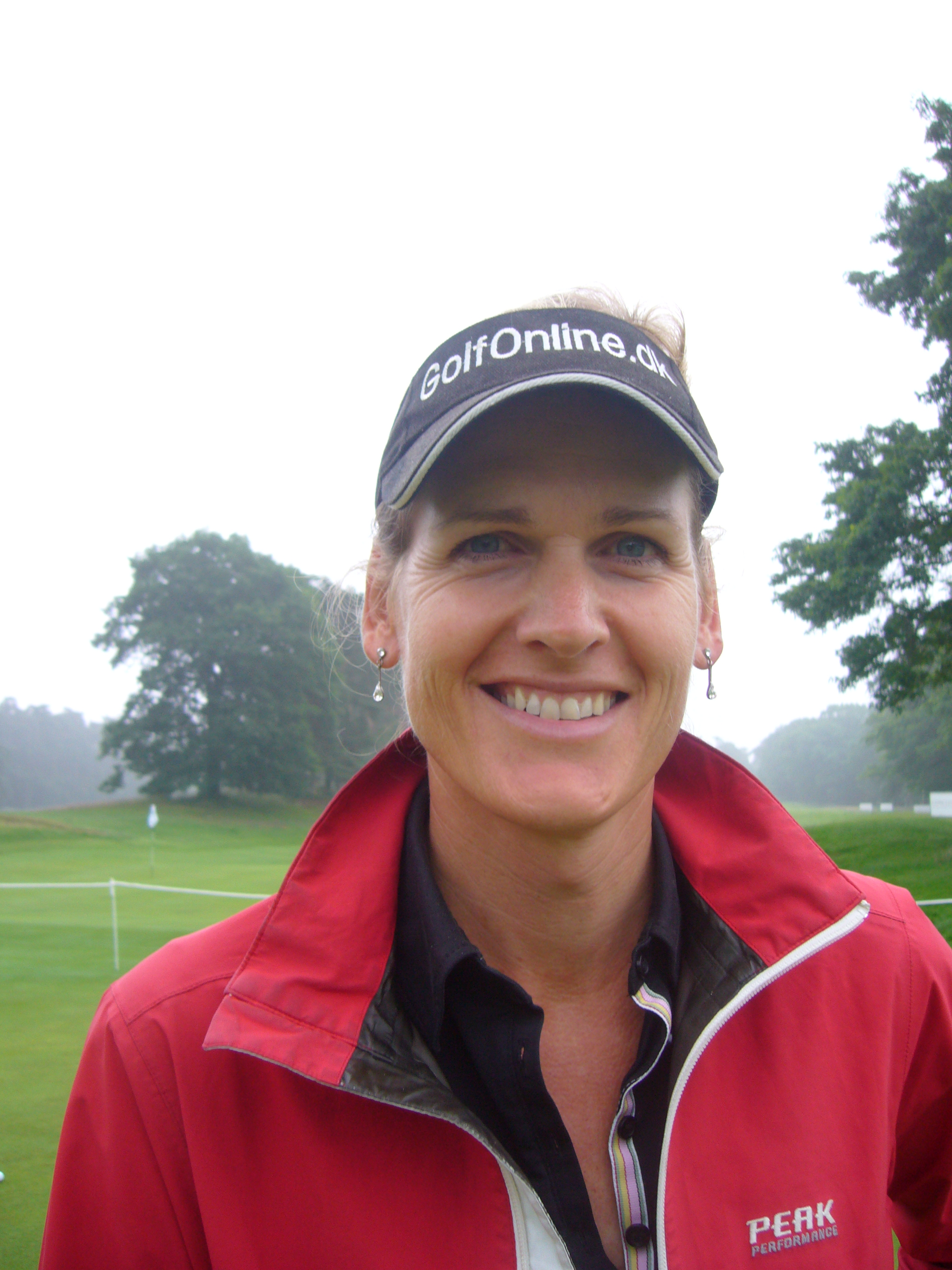
The episode's parody of trans pro golfer Mianne Bagger was criticised as being transphobic.

Around the episode's original broadcast in early 2005, the same-sex marriage question was one of the hottest political issues in America. It had been an especially hot topic during the then-recent presidential election in the United States. Marty Kaplan, a professor at Annenberg School for Communication and radio host on Air America Radio, commented that the episode is telling "those who demonize homosexuality, or what [these people] call the homosexual agenda," anything from "lighten up" to "get out of town". This was not the first time that an episode of the show had brought up a current issue. Writing in an article about "There's Something About Marrying" for The New York Times, Sharon Waxman said that "as television's longest-running situation comedy, The Simpsons is no stranger to hot-button social, religious and political issues, mocking wardrobe malfunctions, Hollywood liberals and born-again Christians, among other targets." On the episode's broadcast, Gay and Lesbian Alliance Against Defamation director Damon Romine criticised its depiction of Patty's fiancée 'Leslie Robin "Veronica" Swisher', a parody of trans pro golfer Mianne Bagger, as transphobic, stating that "the 'reveal' of Veronica reinforces a dangerous myth that transgender people are trying to deceive or trick us. When Marge dramatically ripped away Veronica's choker to reveal a bulging Adam's apple, it seemed funny; but in real life, such revelations are often followed by terrible violence. It's no joke.".

== Speculation, publicity and broadcast ==
"There's Something About Marrying" was originally broadcast on February 20, 2005, in the United States. It was reported a long time in advance of the episode's airing that a major character would come out as gay during the episode. At San Diego Comic-Con in July 2004, Al Jean revealed: "We have a show where, to raise money, Springfield legalizes gay marriage. Homer becomes a minister by going on the internet and filling out a form. A long-time character comes out of the closet, but I'm not saying who." This led to much media speculation and publicity in the press for the episode. The last such "mystery Simpsons storyline", as BBC News called it, occurred with the "Alone Again, Natura-Diddily" episode in which it was announced prior to the broadcast that a character would be killed in the episode, leading to weeks of speculation before the revelation that it was Maude Flanders.

There was a widespread debate among fans of the series as to who the character coming out of the closet would be, also similar to how they years earlier debated who shot the character Mr. Burns. Matt Groening joked at San Diego Comic-Con that "it's Homer". Many fans correctly guessed that it would be one of Homer's sisters-in-law, either Patty or Selma, while others believed it to be Waylon Smithers. It had for a long time been hinted on the show that the Smithers character was gay and in love with his boss Mr. Burns. However, as The Baltimore Sun writes, it would have been unlikely for Smithers to be the outed character because it would not have been a surprise to fans, and his love for his heterosexual boss would prevent him from marrying another person. Patty was suspected by fans and the press because she had not often been seen dating men on the show. The tabloid newspaper The Sun revealed already in September 2004 that the character who would come out was Patty, though this was regarded as a rumor, and Jean would not confirm it. Bookmakers in the United States and the United Kingdom took bets on which character would be uncovered as homosexual, and if there would be a kiss featured in the episode—BetUS laid odds at four to five that it was Patty, while Smithers had four to one odds and Ned Flanders fifteen to one odds. A kiss was given odds of seven to five. BetUS said gamblers made more than 900 bets on the coming-out on their website. According to The Baltimore Sun, another betting site named PaddyPower.com "stopped taking wagers because so much money was being placed on [Patty]." Jean told The Advocate that he thought it was "an insane thing for someone to take bets on a result that can be determined by other people", referring to the Simpsons staff, "and could be changed by them at the last minute."

The episode was heavily promoted and hyped, with some sources calling it "much anticipated" and "long-awaited". In addition to the publicity about the coming-out of a character, "There's Something About Marrying" was discussed a lot in the media before its airing because of its gay marriage theme. The entertainment website MovieWeb predicted in October 2004 that the episode would become controversial when it aired because of the large children audience and "also because it comes at a time when many states are seeking to ban same-sex wedding ceremonies." According to Knight Ridder, "some conservative groups [...] growled in advance over the episode", but most pre-broadcast publicity was directed at the outing. Mark Pinsky, on the other hand, wrote in his book The Gospel According to The Simpsons that when the announcement that an episode of the show would focus on gay marriage was made, "it stoked a debate that few issues and few television shows could." Before its original airing, Pinsky was interviewed about the episode on ABC's World News Tonight, CNN, BBC Radio, and more, as the author of a book on religion in The Simpsons.

The Fox network, which airs The Simpsons, chose to begin the episode with a Parental Advisory warning stating that it "contains discussions of same-sex marriage" and that "parental discretion is advised." This was a first for the show, which had not received parental advisories before even when dealing with themes such as drug use, gambling addictions, theft, crime, and violence. A warning similar to the one displayed at the beginning of this episode was used in front of the gay-themed "The Puppy Episode" of the Ellen series. The buzz "There's Something About Marrying" had received attracted a lot of viewers to its broadcast, and therefore the Fox network chose to air it during the ratings sweeps. The episode was watched by 10.5 million people in the United States, making it the highest-rated episode of the sixteenth season of The Simpsons. It was up by two million from the season's average rating.

== Reception ==
"There's Something About Marrying" featured the first appearance of an animated same-sex marriage on network television.

Television columnist Ray Richmond wrote that the episode was a cultural milestone for The Simpsons and that the "issue [of gay marriage] was mainstream to some degree, but now that [the staff has] deigned it worthy of the show it is interwoven into the popular culture. The Simpsons bestowed upon something a pop culture status it never had before, simply by being ripe for a joke." John Kenneth White, author of the book Barack Obama's America, similarly called "There's Something About Marrying" a cultural barrier breaker.

The episode, dealing with "one of the most divisive issues in American society" according to The New York Times, became a subject of controversy after its broadcast. The authors of The Marriage and Family Experience called it "one of the more controversial episodes of a frequently controversial cartoon." Several conservative groups and American Christian conservatives thought it was promoting same-sex marriage. Parents Television Council president L. Brent Bozell III criticized "There's Something About Marrying" for bringing up the issue. Even though he had not seen the episode himself, he commented that "at a time when the public mood is overwhelmingly against gay marriage, any show that promotes gay marriage is deliberately bucking the public mood." A researcher for the American Family Association, named Ed Vitagliano, claimed the presentation of same-sex marriage in the episode was "very one-sided". He said that this episode proved "Hollywood's blatant pro-homosexual bias" because despite The Simpsons being "generally kind of a wacky animated program" it was not neutral on the issue. Bozell also worried about the influence the episode would have on children, despite the parental discretion advisory at the beginning, commenting: "You've got a show watched by millions of children. Do children need to have gay marriage thrust in their faces as an issue? Why can't we just entertain them?" Similarly, Vitagliano said that many children watch The Simpsons and Hollywood "will pull out all the stops to promote same-sex marriage — and children will be influenced by it."

Mark Washburn of Knight Ridder wrote that at the time of the episode's broadcast, most Americans were accustomed to seeing homosexual characters on television. He said this is why Patty's coming-out did not become as controversial as the episode's examination of the same-sex marriage issue, which was more sensitive in the country then. The controversy became so big that local news programs in certain cities aired segments about it. In response to the claims that this episode was supporting gay marriage, Al Jean replied that "we don't really take any positions for or against anything, we just like to examine all sides of an issue and I think that anyone who would get their political wisdom from a cartoon might be sadly mistaken." Likewise, Mark Pinsky writes in The Gospel According to The Simpsons that once the episode ended, it was hard to tell what stance on same-sex marriage the writers had and that "both sides of the controversy had their say, voiced by various Simpsons characters". Jean has also cited the episode in defense to critics who say The Simpsons has lost its relevance and edginess in later years. In his book The Simpsons: An Uncensored, Unauthorized History, John Ortved responded to this, commenting that despite the controversies the episode was "in fact a long-winded and lame exploration of the topic."

"There's Something About Marrying" was met with positive reception as well, particularly from gay rights groups. The Gay & Lesbian Alliance Against Defamation (GLAAD) was welcoming of the episode, calling it "a ray of light". GLAAD executive director Joan Garry enjoyed seeing Marge's transformation, from having ambivalent feelings for her sister to then supporting her. He commented that "when Marge learns that Patty's about to marry someone who isn't really a lesbian, she comes to realize that what her sister really deserves is to be in love with and married to a person who's right for her. If millions of Simpsons viewers came away from last night's episode with that little bit of moral truth, it was time well spent." AfterEllen.com's David Kennerley approved of the willingness of a "hit network TV show in prime time, watched by children and adults" to "serve up such a politically charged issue". Rick Garcia, an activist of the gay rights group Equality Illinois, said to the Chicago Tribune that the episode would likely affect society in a positive way because of the iconic status of the show which "shape[s] our attitudes". Unlike many of the conservative groups, Kennerley noted that "in the show's tradition of equal-opportunity lampooning, the message is not all pro-gay. Irksome lesbian stereotypes abound, and Nelson the bully suggests they 'legalize gay funerals.' And naturally, Reverend Lovejoy shutters his church to the same-sex sinners." According to Simpsons writer Mike Reiss, the episode also had supporters among conservative groups. He told Encore magazine that "gay people came out very much in favor of it and were happy with the episode, but arch conservatives and right-wing Christians loved the episode, too, because they seemed to think we were making fun of gay people. We really had it both ways."

Kennerley further wrote that "based on this episode, [...] The Simpsons is in top form. It still reigns as the funniest, brashest, fastest-paced half-hour you'll see on television." Bill Gibron of PopMatters also thought the episode was funny, commenting that it "explored the often-cited 'slippery slope' of allowing matrimony to be defined outside the parameters of a man and a woman—with hilarious results." In regards to the revelation that Patty was gay, The A.V. Club wrote that it "wasn't particularly earth-shattering" but that Marge's initial reaction provided a good twist to the episode. J. Stewart Burns received a Writers Guild of America Award nomination in the animation category for his work on "There's Something About Marrying", although he lost the award to another Simpsons writer.

On the episode's release, Gay and Lesbian Alliance Against Defamation director Damon Romine criticised the depiction of Patty's fiancée 'Leslie Robin "Veronica" Swisher', a parody of trans pro golfer Mianne Bagger, as transphobic, stating that "the 'reveal' of Veronica reinforces a dangerous myth that transgender people are trying to deceive or trick us. When Marge dramatically ripped away Veronica's choker to reveal a bulging Adam's apple, it seemed funny; but in real life, such revelations are often followed by terrible violence. It's no joke.". In a 2022 retrospective, Comic Book Resources criticised the episode as "surprisingly transphobic", a sentiment echoed by Aubrey Norwood, Gayest Episode Ever, and, in 2023, LGBTQ Nation.
