= Tom's Restaurant (Prospect Heights) =

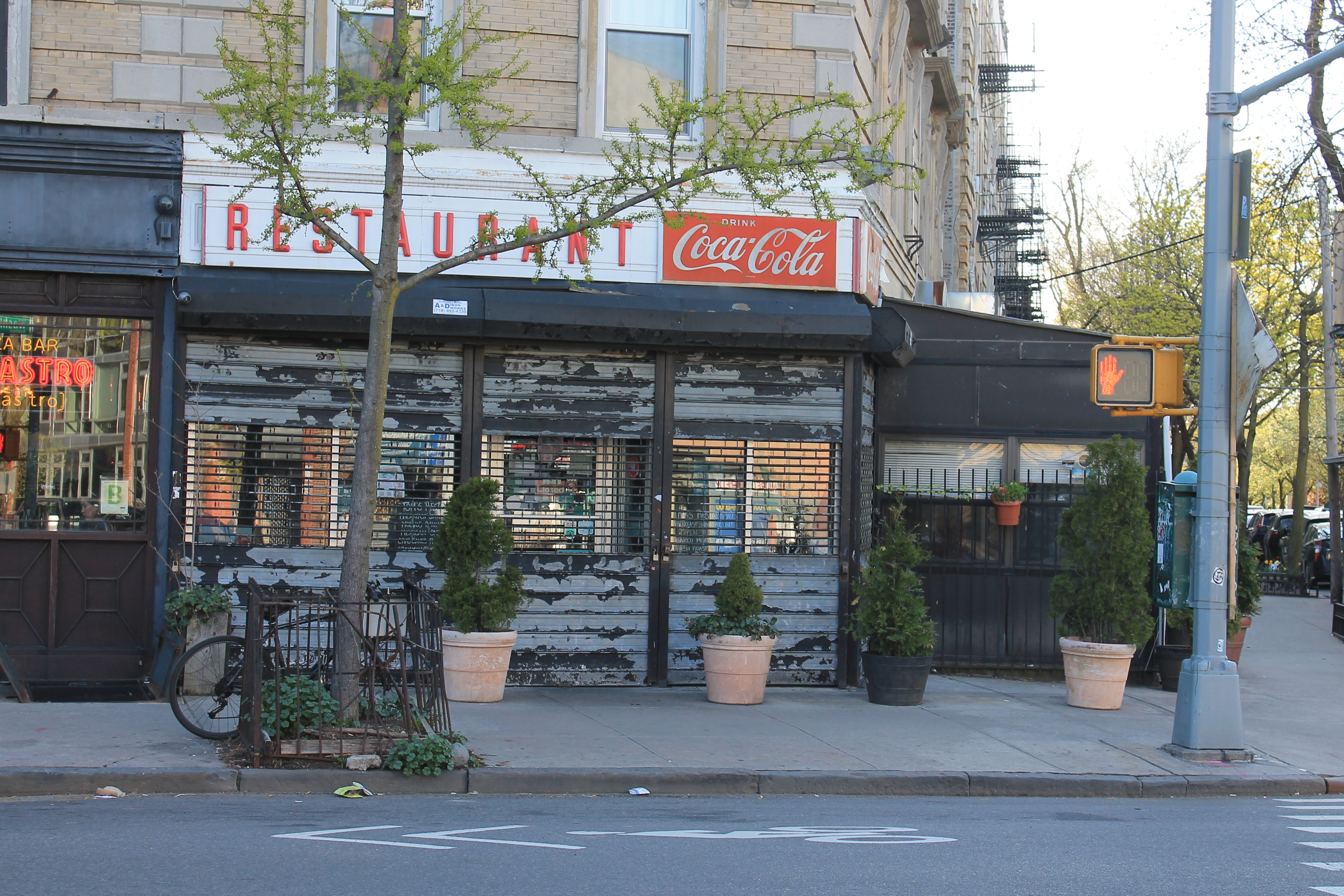
- Tom's Restaurant seen on 14 April 2024.
- Interactive map of Tom's Restaurant

Restaurant information
- Established: 1936
- Owner: Jimmy Kokotas
- Previous owner: Gus Valhavas
- Location: 782 Washington Avenue, Brooklyn, Kings, New York, 11238
- Coordinates: 40.67447°N 73.96329°W
- Other locations: 1229 Boardwalk, Brooklyn, NY 11224
- Website: tomsbrooklyn.com

Tom's Restaurant is a family-owned diner, currently in its third generation, with locations in Prospect Heights, Brooklyn and Coney Island opened in 1936.

In 2022, Eaters named Tom's one of the "16 NYC Brunch Spots Worth Planning the Weekend Around."

== History ==
Tom's opened in 1936 as an ice cream parlor called Lewnes Ice Cream. In 2015, the block they were on was co-named Gus Vlahavas Place, after the second-generation owner who had recently died.

== Popular culture ==
Jeffrey Eugenides wrote Middlesex with Tom's as his inspiration.
