= Gender novels =

Literary genre

A gender novel is a genre of novel that features gender, or the concept of gender, as a central theme to the plot of the novel. The concept of gender may be used to initiate debate regarding gender stereotypes, gender equality or the reversal of gender roles within books. This term is synonymous with gendered fiction. Gender novels may be categorized not only under the genre of gendered fiction but crime, novel of manners, romance novels, western novels, fantasy, and science-fiction.

A gender novel is characterised by the central theme of gender, which is exhibited in the plot, by characters, or within the context of the novel. This involves the inclusion of transgender or androgynous characters, and the challenging of traditional gender roles. Another central theme is the development of gender-focused conflicts throughout the plot, particularly through settings where gender is written in a way that is controversial to the societal norms of the period of writing. Gender novels may also fall into the category of feminist literature.

Famous gender novels include Ursula K. Le Guin's The Left Hand of Darkness, Jane Austen's Pride and Prejudice, Naomi Alderman's The Power, and Markus Zusak's The Book Thief. Many of these gender novels have been critically acclaimed for challenging of gender roles and expectations.

Gender novels as a contemporary genre have their foundations in the late 1940s. Later on, in the 21st century, the works of Jeffrey Eugenides, Jeff Garvin, and Jessica Herthel broke stereotypical gender norms and attempted to warp traditionalist gender views.

== Background ==
=== History of gender in literature up until the 19th century ===
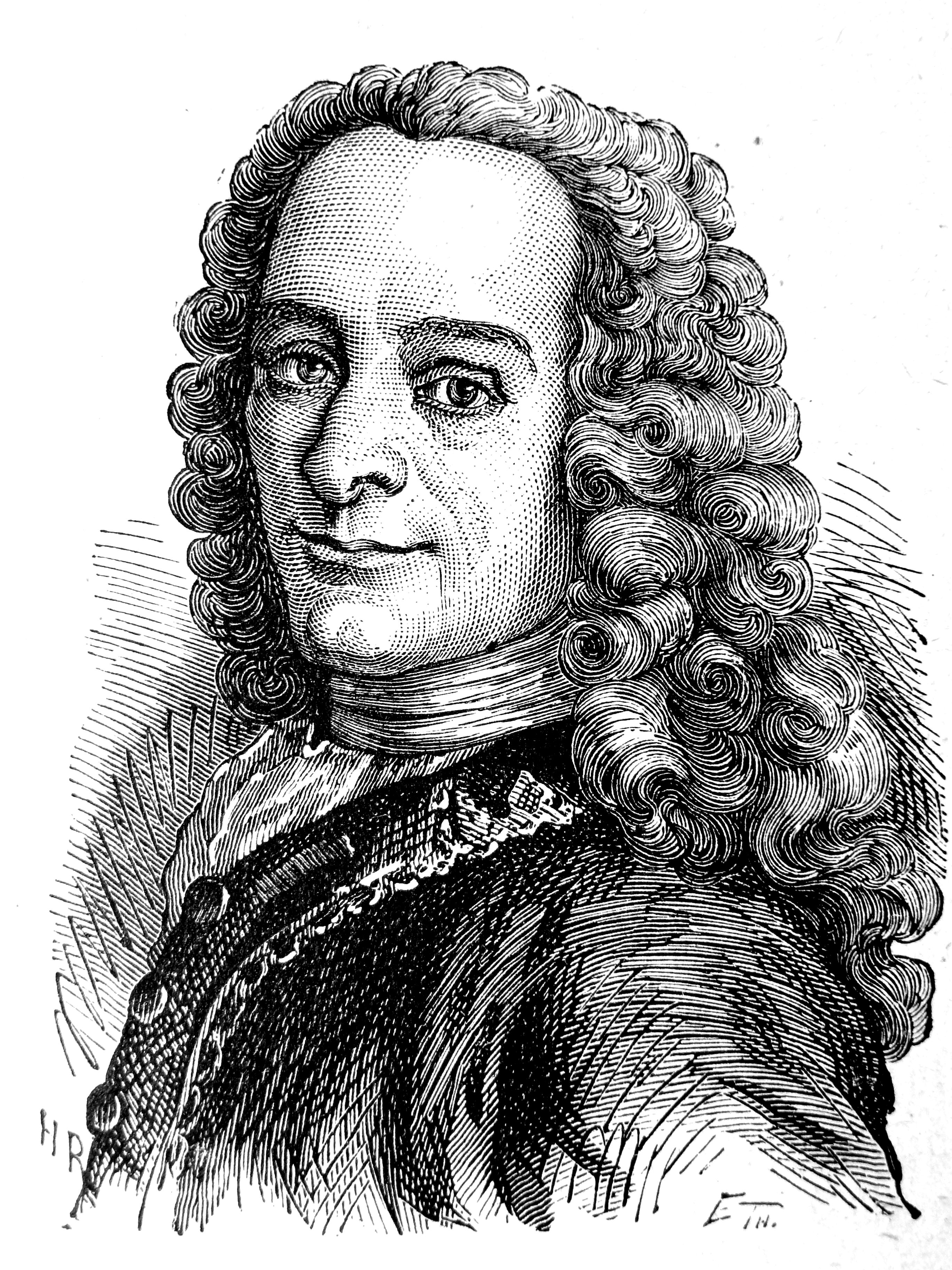
Philosopher and academic Voltaire in 1889.

Until the 19th century, literature reflected the gender roles of the time period. Throughout the 17th, 18th, and 19th centuries, traditional gender roles were enforced. Women were required to wear, act and behave a certain way both in public and in the private home. Prior to the 17th century, men would play women's roles in old Shakespearean plays and musicals. Cross-gender acting is seen as evidence of the fact that women were not typically included or invited to participate in the arts, literature and musical theatrics.

Throughout the 17th century, women were primarily viewed as caretakers and homemakers. Women were discouraged from expressing their opinion about politics, money and other contemporary issues. Due to their overall submissive role, most literature that was produced during this time centered around male characters. The women who were educated and capable of writing were discouraged from pursuing their talent.

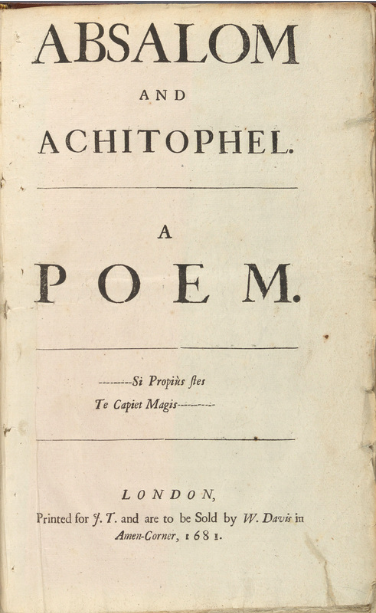
Absalom and Achitophel, by John Dryden.

During the 18th century, women were still seen as submissive. However, the beginning of the cultural revolution in Britain brought about changes to the roles of women. Women were more frequently assisting their husbands in work and had greater access to education. Throughout the cultural revolution, women were still victims of both economic and social discrimination. Their career choices were restricted to marriage, motherhood, nursing or teaching, with their primary roles being child-bearers and wives. Literature still primarily focused on men, reflecting the constructs of traditional gender roles. Nevertheless, works such as John Dryden's satirical poem Absalom and Achitophel have depicted an 18th-century perception of masculinity and the role of women.

Although the 19th century brought about romanticism in literature, it was still a period where women weren't as valued as highly as men. This was shown through literary works by Mary Virginia Terhune, who was an American novelist during the 19th century. She wrote of the suppression of and inferior public attitude towards women, in which she says, that to a man, "women are ... valued according to the amount of hard usage she will endure". Her literature, which is some of the first feminist writings, reflects the gradual uprising against the patriarchy during the late 19th and early 20th centuries.

== Gender novels in the 20th century ==
In the 20th century, movements such as feminism made their presence during the latter half of the century. This is reflected in the emergence of gender novels during this time period, some of the most important being Simone de Beauvoir's The Second Sex and Ursula K. Le Guin's The Left Hand of Darkness. These novels shed light on new concepts regarding the gender construct and envisioned new theories and definitions surrounding gender and how it impacts the human person.

=== The Second Sex ===
De Beauvoir's work The Second Sex was published first in 1949, and across 978 pages and two volumes, detailed Beauvoir's personal feminist thoughts regarding gender's place in the world. In her gender novel, she plays with the notion that "he is the Subject... she is the Other," which framed the concept of gender in terms of a master-slave relationship. Beauvoir also discusses the notion of transcendence, in which she places in the context of the role of women. This idea is examined through the example of women progressing to an authoritarian position in the workforce, where she would be seen as transcending from her gender construct too much. Beauvoir also states that "We judge institutions from the point of view of the concrete opportunities they give to individuals,", which reveals her belief that gender is constructed from birth, e.g. painting girls’ walls pink and boys’ walls blue. Beauvoir states that "one is not born, but rather becomes, woman." This book is seen as a foundational feminist text, and therefore a foundational gender novel that rethinks and reinterprets the way in which gender ought to be understood.

=== The Left Hand of Darkness ===
Another gender novel that was produced in the 20th century is Ursula K. Le Guin's text, The Left Hand of Darkness, which was published in 1969. This book debates whether gender constructs are in fact what constitutes a human being. To highlight how entrenched the construct of gender is within society, she bases her novel on a planet where gender does not exist and where the androgynous race lives in harmony. She imagined a world whose inhabitants have no permanent gender; their sexual roles are determined by context and express themselves only once every month. Le Guin effectively uses her novel to express her thoughts on the role gender and sexual stereotypes play in the way one acts, behaves and responds. "He, after all, had no standards of manliness, of virility, to complicate his pride." Le Guin's text focuses on 1960s concerns and the concept of constructivism, which dictates the idea that feminine attributes are created as a consequence of living in a patriarchal society. Her novel portrays a progressive gender construct where her depiction of the planet is a level playing field, equal for all peoples. This novel was one of the first texts to address the impacts of the construction of gender that have become entrenched throughout history, and throughout societies all over the world. It became the inspiration and springboard for many gender novels that were to come.

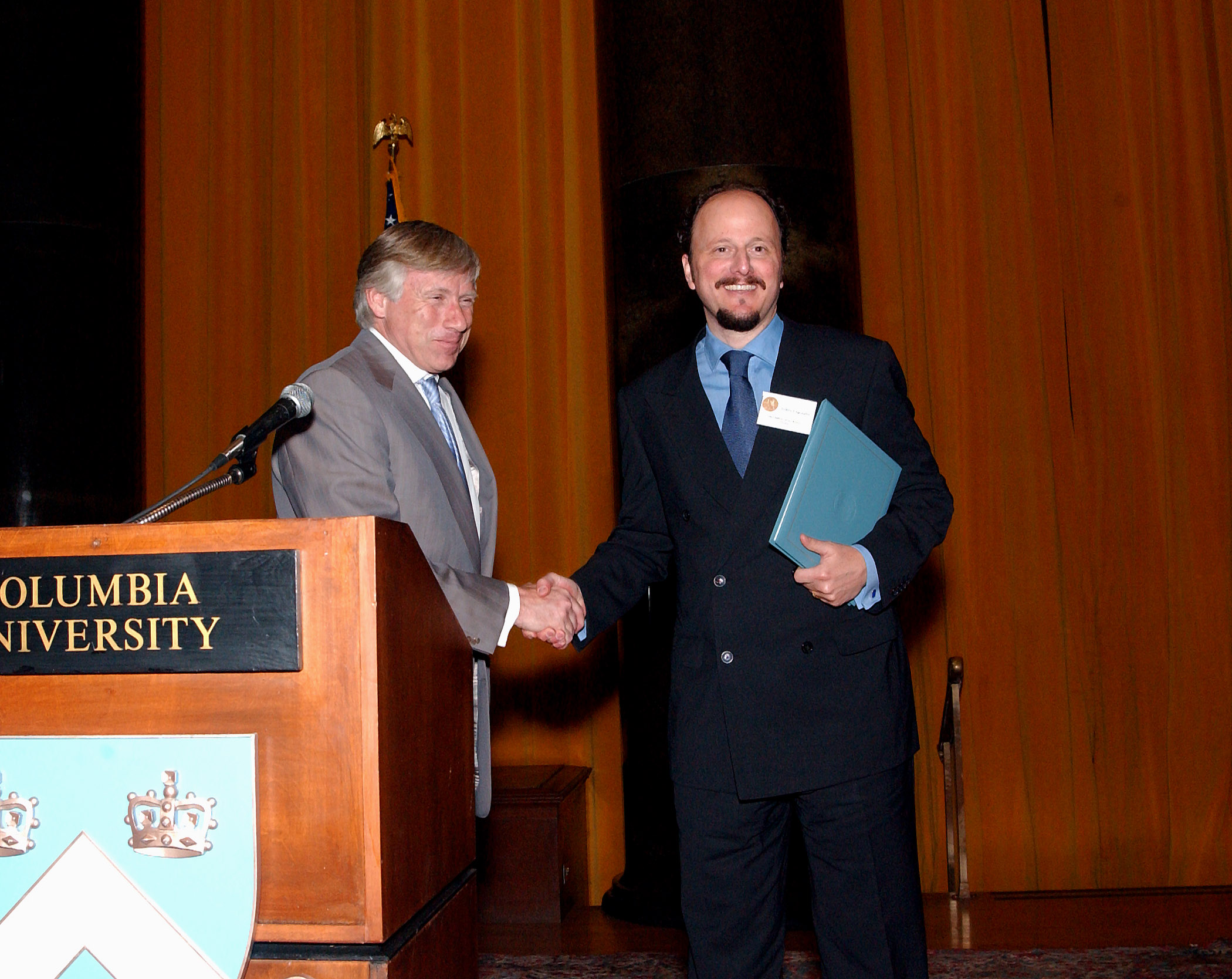
Lee C. Bollinger awarding a Pulitzer Prize to Jeffrey Eugenides

== Gender novels in the 21st century ==
The 21st century brought about a number of changes, including more social movements and many philosophical schools of thought. Postmodernism, narcissism, and revisionism are just a few movements that dominated literature and philosophical writings during this period. The rise in technology use and social media were also factors that had a significant impact on some of these gender novels.

=== Middlesex ===
One of the most famous gender novels that came out of this period was Jeffrey Eugenides's Pulitzer Prize-winning work, Middlesex. The novel details the story of Cal Stephanides, an intersex person growing up in the 1960s. Cal was diagnosed with 5 alpha-reductase deficiency syndrome, which means that his masculine hormones were suppressed in the womb. Cal, therefore, was born genetically as a male but raised by a female in Detroit. At different stages throughout the novel, Cal wears dresses and does his hair in a feminine way and then switches to more masculine suits. Gender is not seen as a static framework in Middlesex, which highlights Eugenides's perspective of gender itself; as fluid and ever-changing societal construct. It is one of the first texts to openly discuss people who suffer from genetic sex diseases such as with 5 alpha-reductase deficiency syndrome. Therefore, with over four million copies of it being sold worldwide, Middlesex has been one of the most successful and fundamental pieces of literature that is preoccupied with gender and its properties, while discussing the link between gender, genetics and science.

=== Symptoms of Being Human ===
Jeff Garvin's 2016 novel Symptoms of Being Human is another text that can be considered a gender novel. The book tells the story of young Riley Cavanaugh, who is a 'gender fluid' adolescent who writes a blog about the struggles of being a teenager, such as bullying and anxiety. The story revolves around Riley's life and their decision to come out as gender-fluid to the world. In an interview, Garvin states that his goal in writing the book was to emphasize how hard it is for gender-fluid people to live in this world, without constantly being reminded of this entire construct of gender. He added that:

It’s important to point out that [in real life], most gender-fluid people can't avoid gendered pronouns—they’re everywhere... my point: a language is a powerful tool for thoughts. So, if a nonbinary person asks you to address them using a pronoun that seems unnatural or awkward to you, honour their request! The awkwardness will pass, your friend will feel respected, and you’ll have taken a significant step toward rewiring your brain and the brains of those with whom you speak.

This novel was a first in the representation of gender-fluid people and was well received by critics and audiences alike.
