= Middlesex (novel) =

2002 novel by Jeffrey Eugenides

- First US edition
- Author: Jeffrey Eugenides
- Language: English
- Genre: Family saga
- Publisher: Farrar, Straus and Giroux
- Publication date: September 4, 2002
- Publication place: United States
- Media type: Print (Paperback and Hardback) and audio-CD
- Pages: 544
- ISBN: 0-374-19969-8
- OCLC: 48951262
- Dewey Decimal: 813/.54 21
- LC Class: PS3555.U4 M53 2002

Middlesex is a Pulitzer Prize–winning novel by Jeffrey Eugenides published in 2002. The book is a bestseller, with more than four million copies sold since its publication. Its characters and events are loosely based on aspects of Eugenides' life and observations of his Greek heritage. It is not an autobiography; unlike the protagonist, Eugenides is not intersex. The author decided to write Middlesex after reading the 1980 memoir Herculine Barbin and finding himself dissatisfied with its discussion of intersex anatomy and emotions.

Primarily a coming-of-age story (Bildungsroman) and family saga, the 21st-century gender novel chronicles the effect of a mutated gene on three generations of a Greek family, causing momentous changes in the protagonist's life. According to scholars, the novel's main themes are nature versus nurture, rebirth, and the differing experiences of what society constructs as polar opposites, such as those found between men and women. It discusses the pursuit of the American Dream and explores gender identity. The novel contains many allusions to Greek mythology, including creatures such as the Minotaur, half-man and half-bull, and the Chimera, a monster composed of various animal parts.

Narrator and protagonist Cal Stephanides (initially called "Calliope") is an intersex man of Greek descent with 5-alpha-reductase deficiency, which causes him to have certain feminine traits. The first half of the novel is about Cal's family and depicts his grandparents' migration from Bursa, a city in Turkey, to the United States in 1922. It follows their assimilation into U.S. society in Detroit, Michigan, then a booming industrial city. The latter half of the novel, set in the late 20th century, focuses on Cal's experiences in his hometown of Detroit and his escape to San Francisco, where he comes to terms with his modified gender identity.

Entertainment Weekly, the Los Angeles Times, and The New York Times Book Review considered Middlesex one of the best books of 2002, and some scholars believed the novel should be considered for the title of Great American Novel. Generally, reviewers felt that the novel succeeded in portraying its Greek immigrant drama and were also impressed with Eugenides' depiction of his hometown of Detroit, praising him for his social commentary. Reviewers from the medical, gay, and intersex communities mostly praised Middlesex, (Note: Olivia Banner wrote in the peer-reviewed academic journal Signs that "reviews of the novel in medical journals judge it favorably for what it reveals about the interior lives of the intersexed" and "the majority of reviews written in the intersex and queer press applauded the novel". She also noted that the novel was a finalist for the Lambda Literary Award, which is given to works that celebrate or explore LGBT themes.) though some intersex commentators have been more critical. In 2007, the book was featured in Oprah's Book Club.

== Conception, research, and publication ==
After publishing his first novel, The Virgin Suicides, in 1993, Jeffrey Eugenides started on his next project Middlesex. He was inspired by having read Herculine Barbin, the diary of a 19th-century French convent schoolgirl who was intersex. Eugenides had first read the memoir in 1984 and believed it evaded discussion about the anatomy and emotions of intersex people. He intended Middlesex to be "the story [he] wasn't getting from the memoir".

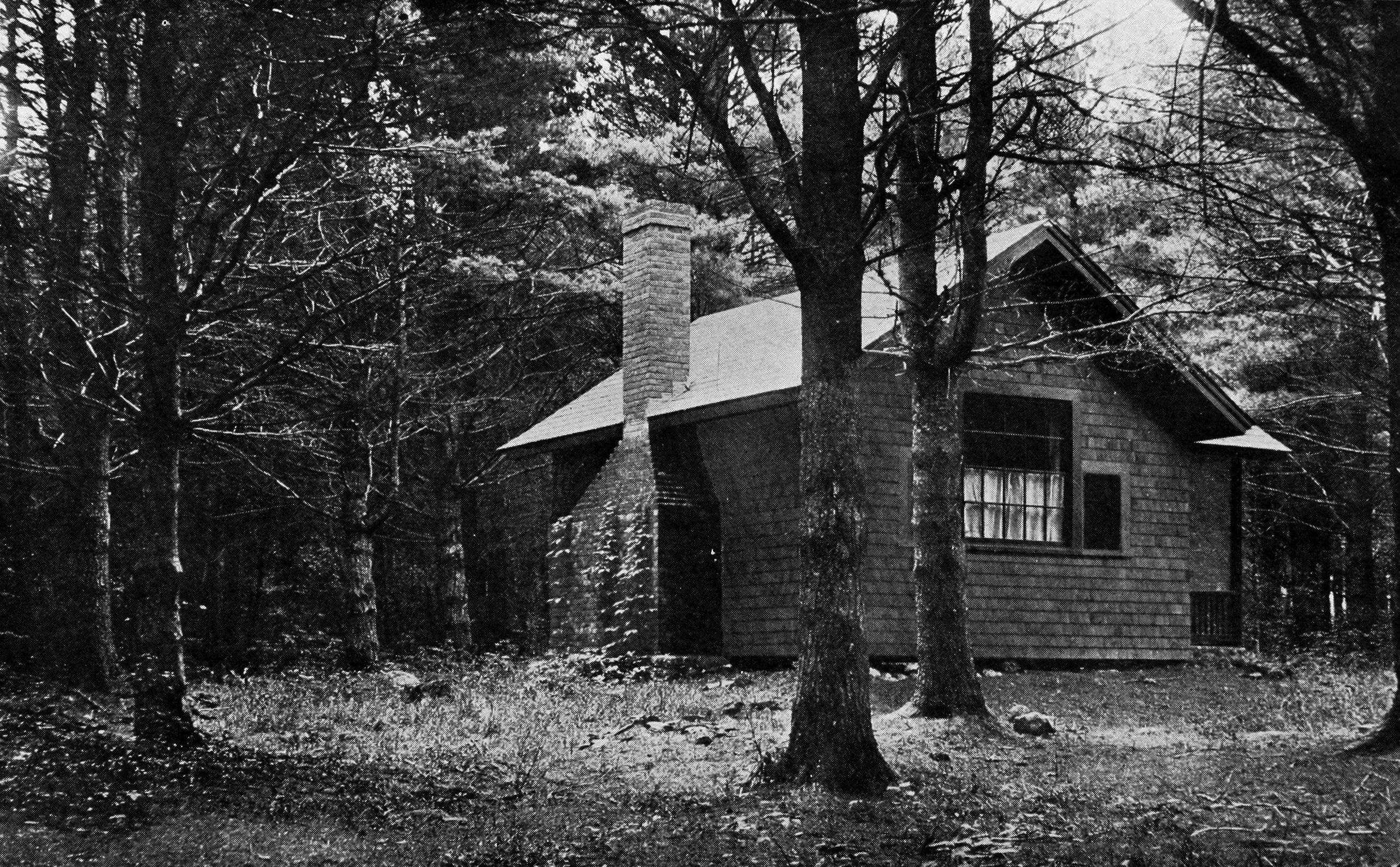
Eugenides found the environment at MacDowell Colony productive.

Eugenides worked on Middlesex for nine years. He started writing during his short-term residence at the MacDowell Colony in New Hampshire, United States, (Note: At MacDowell Colony, Eugenides' studio was a "master bedroom of a large white wooden farmhouse". His room was ornamented with a large fireplace and a Persian rug. Eugenides enjoyed the place, writing, "It was like having a country house suddenly, like going from being a starving artist to a landowner.") and finished the novel in Berlin, Germany; he had accepted a grant from the German Academic Exchange Service in 1999. Eugenides spent the first few years trying to establish the narrative voice for his novel. He wanted to "[tell] epic events in the third person and psychosexual events in the first person". According to Eugenides, the voice "had to render the experience of a teenage girl and an adult man, or an adult male-identified hermaphrodite".

Although Eugenides sought expert advice about intersex, sexology, and the formation of gender identity, he refrained from meeting with intersex people, saying, "[I] decided not to work in that reportorial mode. Instead of trying to create a separate person, I tried to pretend that I had this [physical feature] and that I had lived through this as much as I could". Eugenides read books, sifted through many sheets of microfiche, and combed through videotapes and newsletters that dealt with the subject. He visited the New York Public Library's Schomburg Center for Research in Black Culture to search for the sole copy of a book about an "elusive historical figure". He discovered details of what he considered a vivid intersex condition while browsing Columbia University's medical library.

After discovering in his library research 5-alpha-reductase deficiency, an autosomal recessive condition manifested primarily in inbred, isolated population groups, his perception of the novel significantly changed. Rather than a "slim fictional autobiography" of an intersex individual, the novel would be epic in scope, tracing the lives of three generations of Greek Americans. Eugenides lived in Brooklyn when he began his first draft of the novel. He went through a lengthy brainstorming process. He would write 50 pages in one voice, restart in a different voice with 75 pages, and then pursue a different narrative angle. He wanted the novel to be an "intimate" portrayal of protagonist Cal's transformation, so he wrote a draft in the first-person narrative in Cal's voice. He could not, however, portray Cal's grandparents intimately, so he completely abandoned his preceding year's draft in favor of writing the book in the third-person. He gradually violated his narrative convention by restoring the first-person voice amid the third-person narration to depict the mindsets of both Cal and Cal's grandparents. During the writing process, Eugenides moved from Brooklyn to Manhattan and later returned to Brooklyn. Worried about the narrative's sounding forced, he added instances of "self-reflexivity" to Cal's voice. After several years of struggling with the narrative voice, Eugenides finally seated himself at his desk and wrote Middlesex's initial page, "500 words that contained the DNA for the protein synthesis of the entire book."

Middlesex was published for the North American market in September 2002 by Farrar, Straus and Giroux in the United States and Vintage Canada for Canada. A month later, it was released in the United Kingdom by Bloomsbury Publishing. The novel has been translated into 34 languages; the Spanish-language edition was translated by Benito Gómez Ibáñez and released in 2003 after the publisher, Jorge Herralde, had acquired the rights in a "tough auction".

== Plot ==
Cal Stephanides (his masculine identity), also known as Calliope (feminine), recounts how 5-alpha-reductase deficiency, a recessive condition, caused him to be born with female characteristics. The book continues with accounts of his family's history and the conception of Cal, his childhood and teenage years being raised as a girl, and the discovery of his intersex condition. Cal weaves his opinion of the events in hindsight from his life after his father's funeral. Middlesex is set in the 20th century and interjects historical elements, such as the Balkan Wars, the Nation of Islam, the 1967 Detroit riot, and the Watergate scandal into the story.

Cal's grandparents flee from Smyrna, boarding a passenger ship, as the city burns in flames.

In 1922, Cal's paternal grandfather, Eleutherios "Lefty" Stephanides, lives in Bithynios, a village in Asia Minor. In the small village, high on the slope of Mount Olympos above the city of Bursa, incestuous marriages between cousins are a quietly accepted practice. Lefty makes a living selling silkworm cocoons harvested by his sister, Desdemona. The siblings are orphans; their parents are victims of the ongoing Greco-Turkish War. Lefty and Desdemona develop a romantic relationship as the war progresses. They flee the chaos brought by the war on a ship to the United States amid the Great Fire of Smyrna. Their histories unknown to the other passengers, they marry each other on board the vessel.

After arriving in New York, they locate and stay with their cousin Sourmelina "Lina" Zizmo, in Detroit, Michigan, a closeted lesbian and the only person who knows of the siblings' incestuous relationship. Lefty takes a job at Ford Motor Company, but is later retrenched. He unknowingly joins Lina's husband, Jimmy, in bootlegging. Desdemona gives birth to a son, Milton, and a daughter, Zoe. Lina gives birth to a daughter, Theodora or "Tessie". The relationship between Lefty and Desdemona declines after she learns that there is an increased chance of genetic disease for children born from incest. In 1924, after Milton's birth, Lefty opens a bar and gambling den called the Zebra Room.

Milton and Tessie marry in 1946. They have two children, Chapter Eleven (Note: Because his brother drives the family business into bankruptcy, Cal refers to him by a specific portion of the US bankruptcy law.) and Calliope ("Callie"). Prior to Callie's birth, Desdemona predicts the child to be a boy, although the parents prepare for a girl. Chapter Eleven is a biologically "normal" boy; however, Callie is intersex. Unaware of this, her family raise Callie as a girl. Elements of family life are portrayed against struggles in the rise and fall of industrial Detroit. The family gets caught up in the 1967 Detroit riot resulting from racial tensions, after President Johnson authorizes the use of federal troops, and the family restaurant is raided during this period. Fleeing school integration, the family moves to a house on Middlesex Boulevard, Grosse Pointe.

When she is 14 years old, Callie falls in love with her female best friend, whom Callie refers to as the "Obscure Object". (Note: A reference to the 1977 film That Obscure Object of Desire directed by Luis Buñuel) In separate encounters, Callie has her first sexual experiences with a woman, the Obscure Object, and with a man, the Obscure Object's brother. After Callie is injured by a tractor, a doctor discovers that she is intersex. She undergoes tests and examinations at a clinic in New York, and it is determined that her body will naturally develop more masculine traits. After learning about the syndrome and facing the prospect of sex reassignment surgery to make her anatomy appear "normally" female, Callie runs away and assumes a male identity as Cal, who hitchhikes cross-country and reaches San Francisco, where he joins a burlesque show as Hermaphroditus.

Cal is arrested by police during a raid on his workplace. He is released into Chapter Eleven's custody and learns of their father's recent death. The siblings return to their family home on Middlesex. Desdemona privately confesses to Cal that her husband is also her brother, recognizing Cal's condition and associating it with stories from her old village about children born of incest. As Milton's funeral takes place at the church, Cal stands in the doorway of his family home, assuming the male-only role in Greek traditions to keep his father's spirit from re-entering the home.

Running in parallel is a flashforward narrative of Cal's life long after Middlesex. Some twenty-five years later, Cal is now a diplomat stationed in Berlin. He meets Julie Kikuchi, a Japanese-American woman, and tentatively starts a relationship with her after telling her about his past.

== Autobiographical elements ==
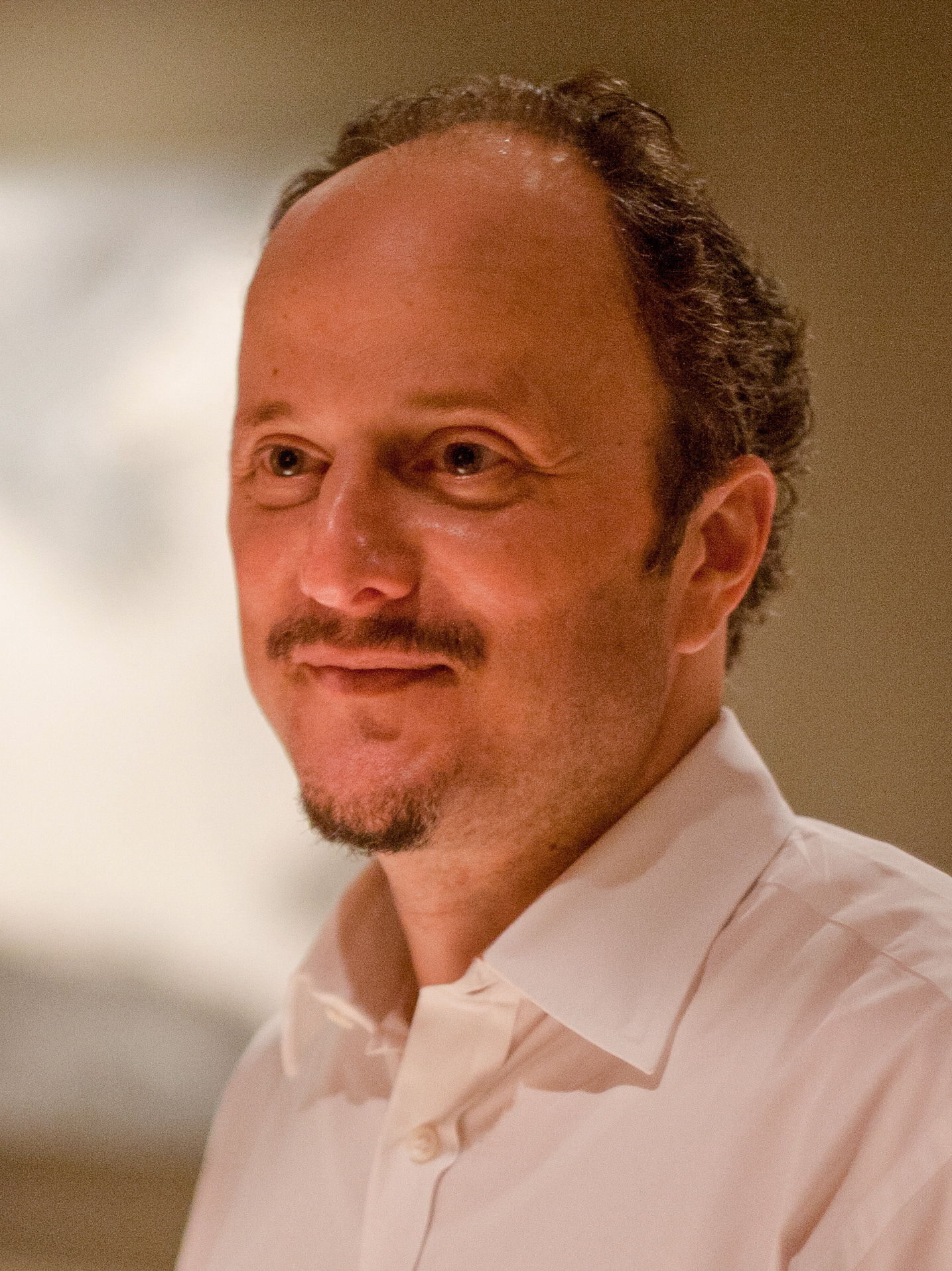
Although the novel is not autobiographical, Jeffrey Eugenides based many details of Middlesex on his own life

Reporters and critics noted that many characters and events in Middlesex parallel those in Eugenides' life. The author denied writing the novel as an autobiography. In an interview by National Public Radio in 2002, he commented on the similarities:

Because the story is so far from my own experience, I had to use a lot of details from my own life to ground it in reality, to make it believable for me and then hopefully for the reader, as well. So I would use my own physical appearance. I would use details from my grandparents' life, the streets they lived on, the kinds of places they lived. And all this made it real for me because it was a tall order to write such a story.

Eugenides blended fact and fiction in his book. Like Cal, the author was born in 1960; unlike his creation, he is not intersex or transgender. His family moved to a house on Middlesex Road in Grosse Pointe after the Detroit riot in 1967. Eugenides studied at University Liggett School, a private institution that served as a model for Callie's Baker and Inglis School for Girls. He tapped into his own "locker room trauma", an adolescent experience of being naked among many other nude bodies, and used it to develop Callie's self-discovery of her body during puberty. He based the name of the character the "Obscure Object" on a Brown University classmate whom he found alluring and to whom he gave that nickname. (Note: When discussing the girl whom both Eugenides and his classmate Rick Moody liked, they would refer to her as the "Obscure Object". While hosting a talk about his third novel The Marriage Plot at the Toronto Reference Library on October 24, 2011, he met her for the first time since the 1980s. She is now an art historian and lives in Toronto, Ontario, Canada.) Eugenides married a Japanese-American artist, Karen Yamauchi, (Note: The couple met at MacDowell Colony during Eugenides' stay there and married in 1995.) and moved to Berlin.; similarly Callie moves to Berlin and has a Japanese-American love interest and is alluded to settling down with her as his "last stop".

Eugenides is of Greek heritage, albeit only through his father's side. Although his paternal grandparents were not siblings like the Stephanides, they were silk farmers like their fictional counterparts. Also like Cal, Eugenides learned some Greek customs to help himself understand his grandparents better. The Zebra Room and the bartender profession are other items shared by their grandfathers; Eugenides said the inclusion of the bar was a deliberate "secret code of paying homage to my grandparents and my parents." Several aspects of Chapter Eleven were based on Eugenides' elder brother, who withdrew from society during a "hippie phase" in his life. While revising and editing the book, the author removed information that could be offensive to his relatives. Not all such material was excised, Eugenides said: "There may still be things in there that will sting."

== Style ==
[T]he writing itself is also about mixing things up, grafting flights of descriptive fancy with hunks of conversational dialogue, pausing briefly to sketch passing characters or explain a bit of a bygone world.

— Lisa Schwarzbaum in Entertainment Weekly

Several reviewers considered Middlesex to be overly verbose. The Economist described the novel as "ponderous" and said that the main story (that of Cal) does not "get off the ground until halfway through" the book. Time's Richard Lacayo concurred; he considered the hundreds of pages about Cal's grandparents and several historical events to be trite, making Middlesex's focus "footloose" in some spots. Several passages in the novel exhibit Eugenides' obsession with "verbose voluptuousness". An example noted by Thea Hillman in her review is an incident in which Cal says, "I sat in my seat, in a state of voluptuous agitation, of agitated voluptuousness, until my stop. Then I staggered out." A contrary opinion is given by Daniel Soar in his article for the London Review of Books. According to Soar, Eugenides did "both background and foreground in all the necessary detail", seamlessly shifting from past to present. Despite the implausible tone of the novel's events, the author successfully makes them "elaborately justified and motivated". The quality of Middlesex's writing was uneven in the opinions of Hillman and another reviewer, Sebastian Smee. The latter pointed out that Eugenides occasionally moves from the heartfelt ("I remember the first time we took off our clothes in front of each other. It was like unwinding bandages") to the "trashily journalistic" ("You've heard of installation artists? Well, the Object [a heavy smoker] was an exhalation artist") on several occasions.

Humor and irony are frequently used in the book. Mark Lawson of The Guardian considered the narrator's tone to be "sardonic[ally] empath[etic]", and other critics have characterized the beginning of the novel as comical. When Cal is baptized as an infant by Father Mike, a Greek Orthodox cleric, the priest receives a surprise: "From between my cherubic legs a stream of crystalline liquid shot into the air ... Propelled by a full bladder, it cleared the lip of the font ... [and] struck Father Mike right in the middle of the face." Derek Weiler of the Toronto Star noted that Eugenides has witty commentary about German compound words and the "horrific qualities of public men's rooms". The author employed another writing device—abrupt incongruity—in describing Desdemona's physical appearances to suggest that her incestuous acts should be taken lightly when judging her. In describing her hair, he wrote that her "braids were not delicate like a little girl's but heavy and womanly, possessing a natural power, like a beaver's tail". According to Penelope Music of Book Magazine, the mismatch in tone of the final two words compared with the rest of the sentence was such that the reading experience was changed from "run-of-the-mill magical realism to true, subversive comedy". An instance of irony is illustrated by Cal's grandparents and parents: His grandparents assimilate into American culture through hard work and struggles while retaining certain old customs. His parents, however, abandon their roots for a more comfortable lifestyle. In another incident, the diner owned by the Stephanides is engulfed in flames during the 1967 Detroit riot. Cal notes that "[s]hameful as it is to say, the riots were the best thing that ever happened to us." The diner was insured and the Stephanides gain a windfall payout.

=== Narrative modes ===
Middlesex is written in the form of a memoir, and switches between the first and the third person in several spots. Used as a comedic device, the third person narratives illustrate Cal's estrangement from Calliope: When he refers to her in the third person, he is identifying her as someone other than him. Patricia Chu, a scholar of English literature, noted the effectiveness of this style in the chapter in which the adolescent Callie searches for information on hermaphroditism. As the teenager reads Webster's Dictionary, following the trail of definitions related to her condition, she reaches the entry for hermaphrodite. The narration switches from personal to external, lending poignancy to the character's final discovery as she confronts the word "monster".

Although the protagonist switches gender throughout the book, Cal's manners of speech and thought are identical to Callie's. Believing that males and females have no inherent disparities in their writing styles, Eugenides treated Cal and Callie as the same person, in terms of narrative voice. He also fixed the narrative voice in terms of age by setting up Cal to relate the entire story at one time. Eugenides gave his protagonist a mostly male outlook, justifying his treatment with the reasoning that Cal or Callie was a man in terms of appearance, sexual desires, and the brain. He asked his wife and other women to review his approaches on Cal's feminine views. The "emotional stuff" was accurate but Eugenides had to refine certain details, such as those about toenail polish.

At the beginning of the book when Cal discusses his family's history and actions prior to his birth, he speaks in an androgynous voice, with limited omniscience; he acknowledges that he is fabricating some of the details. John Mullan, University College London's professor of English and a contributor to The Guardian, wrote that by permitting Cal to be unrealistically aware of fellow characters' thoughts, Eugenides intentionally contravenes an elementary standard in storytelling fiction. In the novel's closing pages, Cal provides minute details about his father's dying moments and thoughts in a nonsensical car accident even though he is several thousand miles from the scene and only learns of the tragedy from his brother. Cal has the ability to dwell in the minds of others because as a female who has become a male, his identity is not confined by his own body. According to Mullan, this "mobility of identification becomes a narrative principle" and is thoroughly exploited in Middlesex. The novel follows the principle that people are molded by events prior to their birth, and Eugenides explores a character's prenatal life in terms of his or her genes; the narrator is, however, subject to the principle that whatever he does not know is of his imagination. As such, contradictory statements highlight the unreliable nature of Cal's narration. While narrating the story that pre-dates his birth, he remarks, "Of course, a narrator in my position (prefetal at the time) can't be entirely sure about any of this." However, he later says, "I alone, from the private box of my primordial egg, saw what was going on." Cal's dubious omniscience, doubtful narration, and parodies combine to show that his unreliability is an act of mischief.

Mullan remarked that Eugenides' narrator has a proclivity to reveal events that will happen in the future. Cal is a narrator who is absorbed in how his fate has been shaped. Cal eschews a chronological telling of the story, where he shares the characters' nescience. He chooses instead to relate the story beginning with his future knowledge. Cal's genes reflect an anticipation of the future: the disclosure of his actual sex identity. Cal mimics this "genetic inevitability" by enjoining the readers to know the future prior to its occurring. Mullan observed that "[f]or the reader, apprehension predominates over surprise" as a result of this narrative style.

=== Genres ===
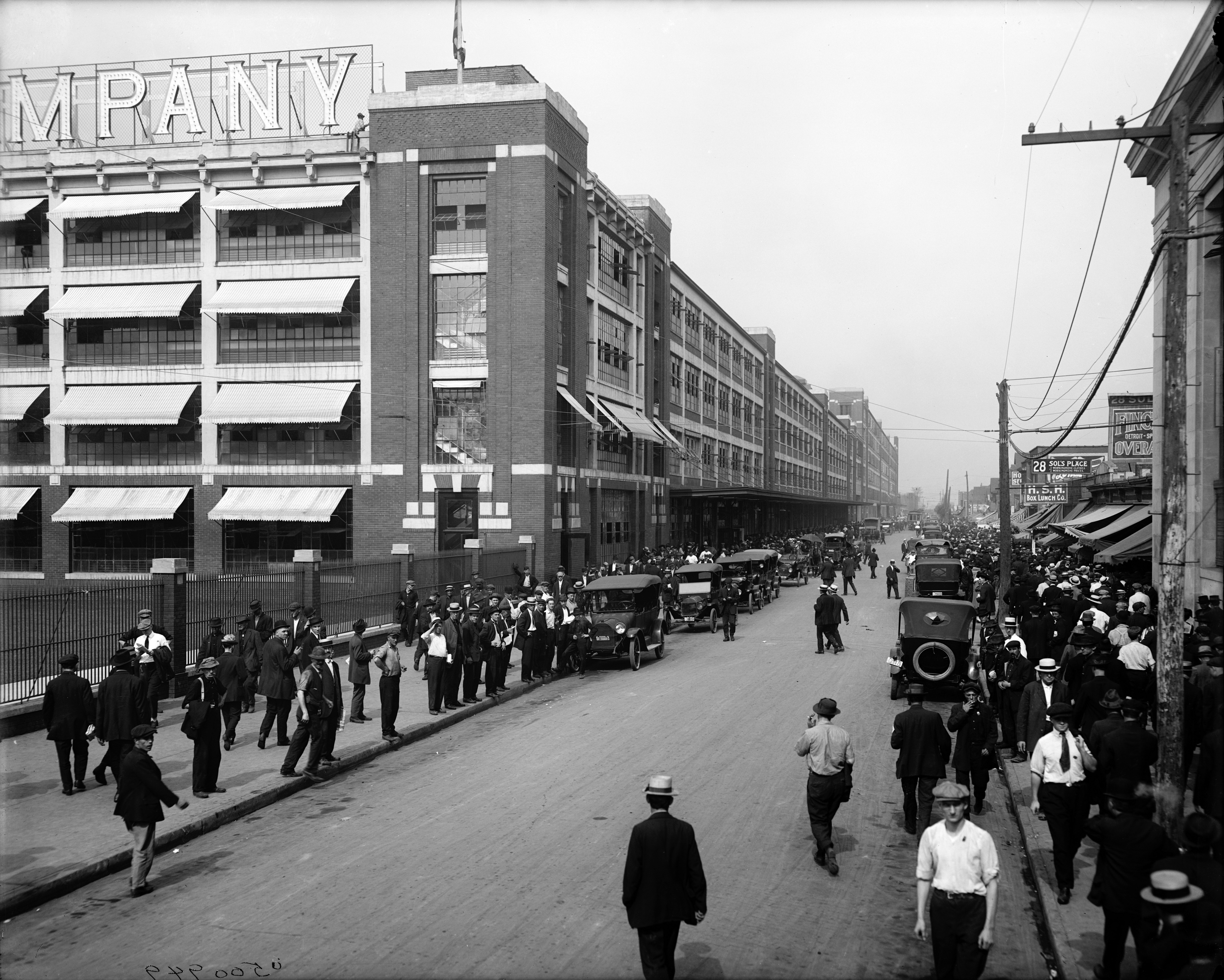
Middlesex sets up its characters to toil through history: Lefty Stephanides's first job in the United States is at Ford Motor Company (as pictured in the 1920s).

The Kirkus Reviews described Middlesex as a "virtuosic combination of elegy, sociohistorical study, and picaresque adventure", and Adam Begley in the New York Observer called it "a hybrid form, epic crossed with history, romance, comedy, tragedy." Other reviews also categorized the book under various genres. Covering the lives of three generations of the Stephanides family, Middlesex is considered a family saga by novelist Geraldine Bedell. The book is more than a mere family saga, according to Samuel Cohen in his paper for Twentieth Century Literature; it depicts the Stephanides' trials and tribulations through historical events. Cohen is not convinced by Eugenides' declaration that Middlesex was not conceived as a historical novel; he said the novel satisfied much of the criterion for the genre. Cal, narrating his story in 2002, describes events from the early 1920s to the mid-1970s. According to Cohen, the difference in timeframes, at least 25 years apart, "establishes that the novel is set safely in the past".

According to Stewart O'Nan of The Atlantic, Cal's narration evokes the style of the picaresque novel, retelling events that have already occurred and foreshadowing the future through "portentous glimpses". Francisco Collado-Rodríguez, a professor of American literature, classified the beginning of Middlesex as a historiographical and metafictional chronicle for its discussion of events such as the Greco-Turkish war and the Great Fire of Smyrna. He also considered the first section of the novel as a tragicomedy about the Stephanides' migration from Greece and assimilation into America. Soar posited Desdemona and Lefty's passage as a romantic comedy: the lovers, brother and sister, pretend to be strangers who meet for the first time, attempting "to unknow themselves, to remythologise themselves by developing a past they could live with, unfamiliar and therefore permissible". As the story progresses, Middlesex becomes a social novel about Detroit, discussing the seclusion of living in a 1970s suburb. At the end of the novel, the story adopts the tone of the detective genre.

The novel is characterized as a "dramatic" Bildungsroman with a "big twist" because the coming-of-age story is revealed to be the incorrect one: after being nurtured as a woman, Cal must instead learn to become a man. The book has "two distinct and occasionally warring halves". Whereas the first part is about hermaphrodites, the second is about Greeks. The latter half, "full of incest, violence, and terrible family secrets", was considered by Daniel Mendelsohn, an author and critic, to be more effective because Middlesex is largely about how Callie inherited the momentous gene that "ends up defining her indefinable life".

Writing for The New Republic, James Wood classified Middlesex as a story written in the vein of hysterical realism. He said the novel is influenced by its own recounting of "excitements, patternings, and implausibilities that lie on the soft side of magical realism". Such moments in the book include how two cousins conceive "on the same night and at the same moment" and how years later, those children marry each other. Woods also pointed out the seeming coincidences that involved locales. Smyrna is the burning city from which she flees to start a new life; New Smyrna Beach is where she spends her retirement. Effectively serving as a double entendre, the title of the book refers to the name of the street where Cal stays at and describes his situation: a hermaphrodite brought up as a girl but who decides to become a boy. Cal's condition is also reflected in his choice of locale to narrate the novel: Berlin is a city formerly of "two halves or sexes" (East and West).

== Themes ==
=== Rebirth ===
Following the Great Fire of Smyrna, Lefty and Desdemona must start life anew. When she is 14 years old, Callie experiences a second birth to become Cal. To become a male, Callie peregrinates across the United States and becomes a midwife of her new life by teaching herself to forget what she has learned as a female. Likewise, Cal's grandparents undergo a transformation, becoming husband and wife instead of brother and sister. Middlesex delves into the concept of identity, including how it is formed and how it is administered. The immigrant predicament is a metaphor and synecdoche for Calliope's hermaphroditic condition; Callie's paternal grandparents become Americanized through the amalgamation of the elements of heredity, cultural metamorphoses, and probability. Callie's maternal grandfather, Jimmy Zizmo, undergoes a rebirth when he transforms from a bootlegger into Fard Muhammad, a Muslim minister.

=== American Dream ===
Middlesex traces the trials and adversity faced by the Stephanides family as they pursue the American Dream. Beginning with Lefty and Desdemona, Cal's grandparents, fleeing from their homeland to Ellis Island and the United States, the novel later depicts the family living in a suburban vista at Grosse Pointe, Michigan. After they immigrate to the United States, Lefty and Desdemona find themselves in a blissful America on the brink of economic collapse. They dream about a perfect America where effort and morals will lead to good fortune. However, they must seek to attain this perfection during a period characterized by Prohibition and xenophobic anti-immigration legislation. Middlesex depicts the tribulations of attaining an identity, especially while dealing with the revelation that the American Dream is a delusion that has already disappeared.

=== Race relations ===
Middlesex portrays the race relations between people of different cultures; Mendelsohn considered the handling of this theme "preachy and nervous". In the United States, a strongly nativist country in the 1920s, Greek immigrants must suffer numerous humiliations at the hands of prejudiced whites. When Cal's grandfather Lefty, a recent Greek immigrant, is working at one of Henry Ford's automobile factories, Ford investigators attempt to Americanize him. They visit his house to ascertain that he has been living as a typical American. For example, during his first English-language lesson, Lefty is taught that "[e]mployees should use plenty of soap and water in the home". The narrow-minded nativists believe that immigrants from Southern and Eastern Europe are unaware of the value of soap and water.

According to scholar Robert Zecker, the novel depicts African-American poverty but does not illustrate its causes. None of the characters think about how 500,000 African-Americans were placed in cramped living areas of only 25 square blocks and the bitterness and rage that stems from such conditions. The African Americans do not forget the years of oppression they have endured. However, the Greek Americans, like other whites, fail to remember that the African Americans were assaulted by whites in 1943 and faced over two decades of oppression after that. Instead, Zecker noted that the characters in the novel believe that the 1967 Detroit riots are "inexplicable cataclysms that came out of nowhere".

The novel skims over the brutal attacks, lasting a week, on blacks in Detroit during World War II. Years later, in 1967, Lefty is incorrectly told that that year's Detroit riots were started by a black man raping a white woman; this falsehood is never rectified. However, despite this misinformation, Lefty denies service to a number of white customers who partook in the riots. One dismissed customer even yells at him, "[w]hy don't you go back to your own country?", returning the spotlight of racial prejudice on him.

The relationship between the Greek Americans and the African Americans is fraught with prejudice. For example, during the Depression, Desdemona is shocked and humiliated that she will have to work in the Black Bottom, a predominantly black neighborhood. When African Americans are beaten or taken advantage of by whites, the characters in Middlesex "suddenly are nearsighted" to the racial prejudice. Despite being in the United States for only 10 years and having experienced racism herself, she can, Zecker noted, "recite at heart the slights at blacks as lazy, dirty, sexually promiscuous, and incapable of self-help." She and other whites, including immigrant whites, feel rage because they are "convinced they were somehow forced out of Detroit following 1967." While walking through the neighborhood, a group of African-American men loafing in front of a barbershop wolf-whistle to Desdemona and make lascivious comments, thus confirming the racial stereotype.

Zecker remarked that in an ironic twist, immediately after the riots, Desdemona's family is shamed by a white realtor who "doubts their fitness (whiteness)" to live in the rich suburb of Grosse Pointe. In the 1970s, African Americans, instead of Mediterraneans, were discriminated against through redlining. Zecker opined that by framing African Americans as the "eternal destroyers" and white ethnics as "yet again the oppressed innocents", Eugenides "captures perfectly the dominant narrative of urban decline in the early twenty-first century American Zeitgeist." Insurance settlement from the damage caused at the riots allows the Stephanides to purchase a home away from the African Americans. The family joins the white flight from the city to avoid the racial desegregation in the public schools, sending Cal to a private school.

=== Ethnic identity ===
When Lefty and Desdemona are forced to immigrate to the United States, they have different mindsets. Whereas Lefty embraces his new country's customs, Desdemona is adamant that she will follow her old country's ways. For example, she is angered that her "immigrant hair" is chopped off because she does not want to "look like an Amerikanidha" and decides to regrow her hair immediately. Lefty attempts to assimilate into American culture by zealously learning English. Lina, the cousin of Lefty and Desdemona, is the paragon of immigrant integration. Cal noted: "In the five years since leaving Turkey, Sourmelina had managed to erase just about everything identifiably Greek about her."

Cal's father, Milton, and his friends and family cherish their Sunday gatherings. They debate and tell stories to each other, attempting to regain their ethnic roots. A "contrarian", Milton enjoys debating Richard Nixon and Henry Kissinger and lamenting the steep cost of church candles. Eugenides repeatedly returns to the gathering prior to Cal's conception, to "manufacture a psychology that drives his narration". As the immigrants attempt to maintain their identity, the stage is set for Cal's writing even before he is conceived.

Middlesex delves into the schism and reconciling of two opposites by contrasting the experiences and opinions of males and females; Greek Americans and White Anglo-Saxon Protestants; Greeks and Turks; and African Americans and White Americans. Critic Raoul Eshelman noted that despite these conflicts, the narrator is able to achieve "ethnic reconciliation" when he moves to Berlin and lives with the Turks, who had murdered his forebears in the early 20th century and who had indirectly enabled his grandparents to consummate their incestuous relationship. Alkarim Jivani opined on BBC Television's current affairs broadcast Newsnight that "[o]nly a child of the Diaspora can do that, because we stand on the threshold of two rooms." The novel also demonstrates that love and family are vital not only to people with unambiguous genders, but also hermaphrodites.

The Greek immigrant family experiences a three-phase acculturation that occurs to immigrant families, according to scholar Merton Lee's research about sociologist George A. Kourvetaris' work. Each generation identifies with different nationalities and cultures. In the first generation, the family members classify themselves as having a Greek nationality. In the second generation, the children classify themselves with an American nationality and Greek Orthodox religion. In the third generation, the grandchildren, who comprise the most acculturated group, characterize themselves with "Greek-immigration status as a class".

The Stephanides lineage is from Bithynios, a village in Asia Minor where the Greek middleman minority is inclined to be in uneasy relations with the Turkish majority. The people of the middleman minority do not assimilate because of their small mercantile businesses and because their host country is antagonistic toward them. Desdemona, a first-generation Greek immigrant, reflects a fixation with not assimilating. She tells her husband Lefty that she does not want to become an "Amerikanidha" and is frightened that her cousin Lina's husband, Jimmy Zizmo, is a Pontian Greek. Desdemona considers Pontians to be adulterated Greeks because Pontians inhabited Turkey, where some became Muslims and did not follow the Greek Orthodox religion.

Daniel Soar opined that Olympus, a parallel to Bithynios, served well as the starting point of a debacle (the eventual birth of an intersex person) that is the "story's catalyst". In Mount Olympus during Justinian's days, silkworm eggs were contraband transported from China to Byzantium by missionaries. (Note: Legend denoted that after a cocoon dropped into her teacup, Princess Si Ling-chi, who was resting under a mulberry tree, conceived silk. The princess ordered her maid to walk after grabbing hold of the thread's loose end. The thread disentangles, relinking the reader to Mount Olympus.) A parallel is drawn when Desdemona, a raiser of silk cocoons, attempts to bring them to Detroit. Because the silkworm eggs are considered parasites by the immigration officials, Desdemona must dispose of them. Soar noted that "for the three generations of Greek Americans who people Middlesex, the mulberry trees of Mount Olympus are an appropriately antique beginning: they are the egg inside which everything began".

=== Greek mythical allusions ===
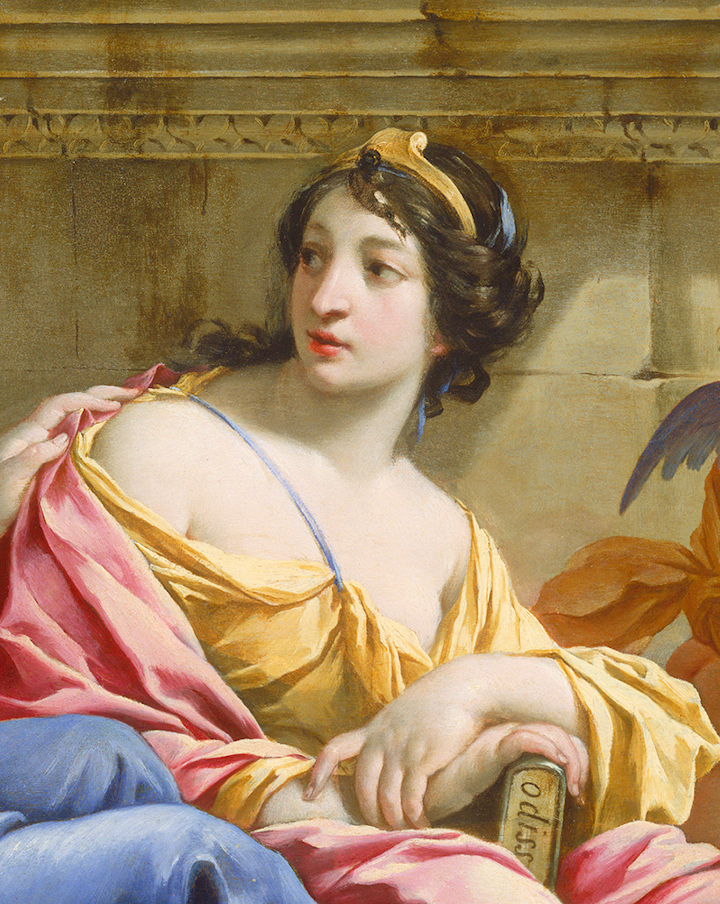
Calliope, the muse of heroic poetry, is the namesake of Eugenides' protagonist.

Middlesex has several allusions to Greek classical myths; for example, the protagonist is named after Calliope, the muse of heroic poetry. Eugenides was partly inspired by the explorations of hermaphrodism in Greek myths to write the novel about an intersex man. In Middlesex, Cal acts out the story of Hermaphroditus, the Greek deity of bisexuality and effeminacy, while eking out a living in San Francisco. While narrating, Cal enters his ancestors' thoughts and empathizes with them, an ability possessed by Hermaphroditus. The protagonist compared himself to another mythical figure—Tiresias, the blind prophet of Thebes; the omniscient seer lived seven years as a woman because of a curse.

Eugenides and several critics compared Cal's condition to mythical creatures described by the ancient Greeks. The author alluded his protagonist's nature and heritage to the Minotaur, the half-man and half-bull creature. Cal's father is conceived after his grandparents' attendance of a theatric play entitled The Minotaur. The puzzle of Cal's genetic identity is akin to the creature's labyrinth, and the thread that leads out of the maze is held here by his paternal grandmother, a former silk farmer. Frances Bartkowski, a scholar of English, named Callie in her puberty as a chimera. The mythical monster is an analogy for a complex personality, a mixture of body parts from various animals that each represents a human aspect or characteristic. Similarly, adolescent Callie is an amalgamation of her genes, neither male nor female, neither adult nor child, and yet all of them at the same time.

In her book column for the Detroit Free Press, Marta Salij said that Cal's identity crisis resembles Odysseus's fate. Whereas the mythical hero is troubled by Poseidon and succored by Athena, the intersex protagonist is affected by his chromosomes in a similar manner. John Sykes, professor of English and religion education, noted another Greek-hero reference. In a manner similar to Oedipus's fulfillment of Pythia's prophecy to slay his father and marry his mother, Callie validates the prediction her grandmother made before her birth by adopting a male identity. Eugenides also used the allusions to Greek mythology and modern pop music to show the passing of familial traits and idiosyncrasies from one generation to the next.

=== Nature versus nurture ===
The novel examines the nature versus nurture debate in detail. At the beginning of the novel, Cal writes, "Sing now, O Muse, of the recessive mutation on my fifth chromosome." He then apologizes, saying, "Sorry if I get a little Homeric at times. That's genetic, too." This is an allusion to the poet Homer, who was also captivated with the nature versus nurture debate. In fact, Cal himself confesses, "If you were going to devise an experiment to measure the relative influences of nature versus nurture, you couldn't come up with anything better than my life."

Callie inherited the mutation for a gene that causes 5-alpha-reductase deficiency, which impedes the conversion of testosterone to dihydrotestosterone. While the former hormone causes the brain to become masculine, it is the latter that molds male genitals. When Callie reaches puberty, her testosterone levels increase significantly, resulting in the formation of a larger Adam's apple, the broadening of her muscles, the deepening of her voice, and the augmentation of her clitoris to resemble a penis. Doctors determine that Callie has the XY chromosomes of a male after inspecting Callie's genitalia. Callie's parents bring her to New York City to see Dr. Peter Luce, a foremost expert on hermaphroditism, who believes she should retain her female identity. Luce plans a gender reassignment surgery to make her a female. However, Callie knows that she is sexually attracted to females, and decides to run away to pursue a male identity. When Cal has a sexual relationship with the Japanese-American photographer Julie at the end of the book, he is able to love "without the need to penetrate the object of his desire".

Mark Lawson of The Guardian noted that the cause of Cal's hermaphroditic condition is an inherited recessive gene. According to UC Riverside psychology professor Sonja Lyubomirsky, the novel examines how an individual's traits are due neither solely to nature nor solely to nurture. Similarly, Cal's gender cannot be defined solely as male or female. Rather, it is both male and female. Addressing how genetic determinism may have renewed the antediluvian beliefs about destiny, Eugenides refutes the post-Freudian beliefs that a person's traits are mainly due to nurture. Thus, the novel pits evolutionary biology against free will. Eugenides sought to find a compromise between these two views. Explaining that gender is a "very American concept", he believes that "humans are freer than we realize. Less genetically encumbered."

=== Gender identity and intersex status ===
Raised as a girl, Cal views himself as a girl who likes other girls. His ability to have a "feminine gender schema" despite his having male genes, substantiates the constructionist position that gender identity is fully dependent on outer influences. However, when Callie discovers that he could have been raised as a boy, he renounces his female gender, recognizing his chosen gender identity as a male. Disowning the female gender before he learned about masculine traits bolsters the argument for the "essentialist ideology of identity". Cal's embrace of his inherent male identity and renunciation of his childhood female gender identity is articulated when he reflects, "I never felt out of place being a girl, I still don't feel entirely at home among men."

Cal exhibits many masculine characteristics when he is a child. He writes, "I began to exude some kind of masculinity, in the way I tossed up and caught my eraser, for instance." In another incident, Cal discusses how his penchants were masculine. While his female classmates are turned off by the blood in the Iliad, Cal is "thrilled to [read about] the stabbings and beheadings, the gouging out of eyes, the juicy eviscerations." Cal ponders his gender identity and how males and females associate with each other, reflecting, "Did I see through the male tricks because I was destined to scheme that way myself? Or do girls see through the tricks, too, and just pretend not to notice?"

Cal also exhibits feminine characteristics, which allows Dr. Luce to classify her as possessing a female gender identity. In a home video taken when Cal was a child, his mother gives him a doll and he nurses it with a milk bottle. Luce carefully observes Callie's actions and diagnoses them as feminine, which causes him to determine that Callie has a feminine gender identity. Luce then concludes that gender identity is nurtured and etched into children at their young ages.

Determining sex is paradoxical because the characters believe that the outward view of genitalia identifies one's sex; Cal's transformation into a male shatters this belief and the methodology behind determining gender. Eugenides addresses how difficult it was for humans to devise a "universal classification for sex". Through Cal, scholar Angela Pattatucci Aragon stated, Eugenides opines that the 1876 system devised by Edwin Klebs that used gonad tissue to determine sex provides the most accurate answer.

According to intersex activist and academic Morgan Holmes, Eugenides posits that a person's sexual attraction determines his or her gender. Cal's wish to become male because he desires females demonstrates a link between gender identity and sexuality. While Callie is not permitted to love the Obscure Object openly, Cal can freely love Julie. Holmes believed that the depiction of Callie "denies the legitimate place of lesbian desire and rewrites it as male heterosexuality." Book reviewer Georgia Warnke has a similar view. She wrote that by making these choices in the novel, Eugenides agrees with the belief that being attracted to females is "masculine" and thus it is "more natural" for a male to be attracted to a female than a female be attracted to a female. Daniel Mendelsohn of The New York Review of Books argued that Callie does not have to be a male in order to be drawn towards females; she could be gay. As an adult, Cal brags, "Breasts have the same effect on me as on anyone with my testosterone level." Mendelsohn noted that this assertion will astonish "Eugenides's (presumably testosterone-rich) gay male readership". Scholar Rachel Carroll agreed, writing that teenage Callie's erotic interest in girls is "retroactively explained and legitimized, by the discovery of his 'true biological nature'." Cal's gender identity postdates rather than predates his sexual interests. Carroll posited that Cal's inability to form heterosexual relationships as an adult is founded not upon his being intersex, but on his rejection of the sexual ambiguities that form his sexual interests as a youth.

When Callie is in New York, she goes to the New York Public Library and searches for the meaning of the word "hermaphrodite"; she is shocked when the dictionary entry concludes with "See synonyms at MONSTER". Callie is not a Frankenstein; she is more like Bigfoot or the Loch Ness Monster. Bartkowski stated that Eugenides' message is "we must let our monsters out—they demand and deserve recognition—they are us: our same, self, others." Morgan Holmes, formerly of ISNA, describes how the book constructs an intersex character whose life reproduces "social fascination with the monstrous and the deviant."

Seven Graham wrote in Ariel, a journal published by the University of Calgary, that Eugenides' "persisen[t]" use of the word "hermaphrodite", instead of "intersex", alludes to Hermaphroditus. Hermaphroditus, a young man, is chased by the nymph Salmacis. She begs the Gods to bind her and Hermaphroditus together, and the Gods literally fulfill her wish. Hermaphroditus' name is a compound of his parents' names—Hermes and Aphrodite. He instantaneously turns into someone of both sexes. Devastated because he is no longer fully male, he "curses" the location where he first met Salmacis. Graham stated that the use of "hermaphrodite" carries negative connotations:

Based on this origin story, the hermaphrodite's lot is miserable, associated with disempowerment, the theft of identity and an unhappy dual existence. In addition, the term "hermaphrodite" may be deemed problematic because it alludes to an impossible state of being: no-one can be equally male and female and the preferred term "intersex" indicates a blended rather than divided state. While the modern term might indicate the possibility of redefining sexual ambivalence, Cal is associated in the novel with the mythic term and all it connotes. His connection to this tragic figure is confirmed by his performance as "Hermaphroditus" in a sex show at the age of fourteen, just as he is beginning his female to male transition.

Writing that he belongs to the Intersex Society of America, Cal notes that he has not participated in any of the group's rallies because he is not a "political person". While discussing political activism, Cal uses the word "intersex", though in other parts of the novel, he uses the word "hermaphrodite". In the 1920s, Bernice L. Hausman described "intersexuality" as a "continuum of physiological and anatomical sex differences", contesting the notion of a "true sex" concealed in the tissues of the body. Though "hermaphrodite" is burdened by the implications of the anomaly, "intersexuality" is a neologism that tries to "naturalize various sexes, which themselves are naturally occurring." Because Cal uses "hermaphrodite", he indicates that the sole normal genders are the classifications of male and female. Eugenides was asked by an Oprah's Book Club member why he used the term "hermaphrodite" despite its usage being "either terribly ignorant or unforgivably callous". Eugenides replied that he reserved "hermaphrodite" for a literary character: Hermaphroditus. He further stated: "When speaking about real people, I should—and I do my best to—use the term 'intersex'." Noting that one of the initial sources he consulted was the journal Hermaphrodites with Attitude published by the Intersex Society of North America, he said that those writers have "co-opted" the term "hermaphrodite". Their action is reminiscent, Eugenides wrote, of how some members of the gay community have "reclaimed" the term "queer". Eugenides stated that it is no surprise that Cal uses "hermaphrodite" and further elaborated: "It's paradoxical: Cal can say 'hermaphodite' but I can't. Or shouldn't."

=== Incest and intersex ===
Incest and intersex is another theme in Middlesex. Eugenides examines the passionate feelings that siblings living in seclusion experience for each other. Milton and Tessie, second cousins, are conceived during the same night, hinting to the incest of Desdemona and Lefty. Desdemona and Lefty's incestuous relationship is a transgression of a powerful taboo, indicating that someone will suffer for their wrongs; in a way, Cal's intersex condition symbolizes this Greek hubris. In another incestuous relationship, Milton makes love to Tessie using a clarinet which he lovingly rubs against her; their incestuous relationship enables them to contribute mutated genes to their child Cal. Cal's mother interferes with fate by attempting to make her second child a daughter. Cal believes this interference was a factor in his being intersex. Conversely, Cal's relationship with his brother, Chapter Eleven, is indicative of the possible dissimilarities that are products of the biosocial.

Thea Hillman, an intersex activist and board member for the (now defunct) Intersex Society of North America (ISNA), wrote in the Lambda Book Report, 2002, that the combination of incest and intersex is "inaccurate and misleading". Noting that incest is a loathed social taboo that has "shameful, pathological and criminal repercussions", she criticized Eugenides for underscoring that Cal's intersex condition is due to incest. Hillman stated that this adds to the fallacious belief that intersex people are "shameful and sick" and a danger to society's wellbeing.

Seven Graham agrees with Hillman and Holmes, writing that Cal is paralleled with the tragic Greek mythological characters Hermaphroditus, Tiresias, and the Minotaur. They opined that other "deviant" characters in the novel such as Lefty and Desdemona are spared the "tragic or monstrous" allusions even though there are numerous examples of incest in Greek mythology. They listed the marriage of Oedipus and his mother Jocasta, as well as the son Adonis produced by the incest between Theias and his daughter Smyrna as examples. Therefore, Graham stated that comparing Cal, an intersex person, to people who were "mythological monsters" is "complicit with [the] exploitation" of intersex people.

== Reception ==
=== Honors and adaptation ===
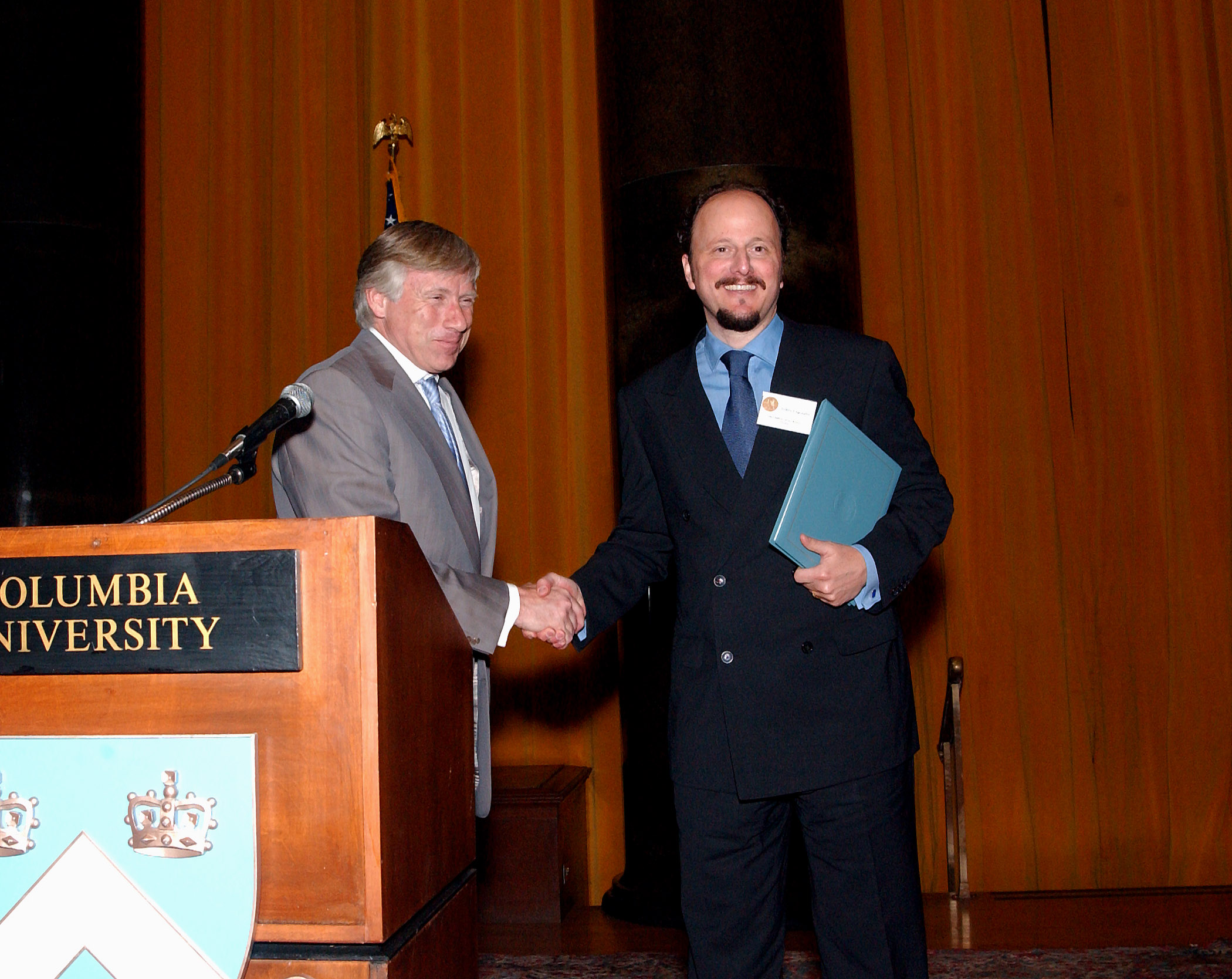
Lee Bollinger awards the 2003 Pulitzer Prize to Jeffrey Eugenides on May 30, 2003.

In 2003, Middlesex was awarded the Pulitzer Prize for Fiction. The Pulitzer Board (Note: The 2003 Pulitzer Board was composed of three jurors. Gail Caldwell, a past Pulitzer Prize winner and the chief book critic of The Boston Globe, chaired the panel. The other two jurors were Joel Conarroe, the president of PEN American Center, and David Gates, a senior editor at Newsweek.) wrote in their report that Middlesex is a "vastly realized, multi-generational novel as highspirited as it is intelligent . . . Like the masks of Greek drama, Middlesex is equal parts comedy and tragedy, but its real triumph is its emotional abundance, delivered with consummate authority and grace." Eugenides was attending the Prague Writers' Festival when Middlesex won the Pulitzer Prize. When a young Associated Press photographer notified him about winning the award, Eugenides was dubious, noting that "[i]t seemed very unlikely that he would be the messenger of such news." At the time, Eugenides was with the Canadian author Yann Martel who confirmed the photographer's words after checking on the hotel's computer. A waiter brought champagne to Eugenides, and Greek women started kissing him. When journalists called Eugenides, he declined to take their calls, saying in an interview later that he wanted to "celebrate the moment instead of leaping immediately into the media maelstrom."

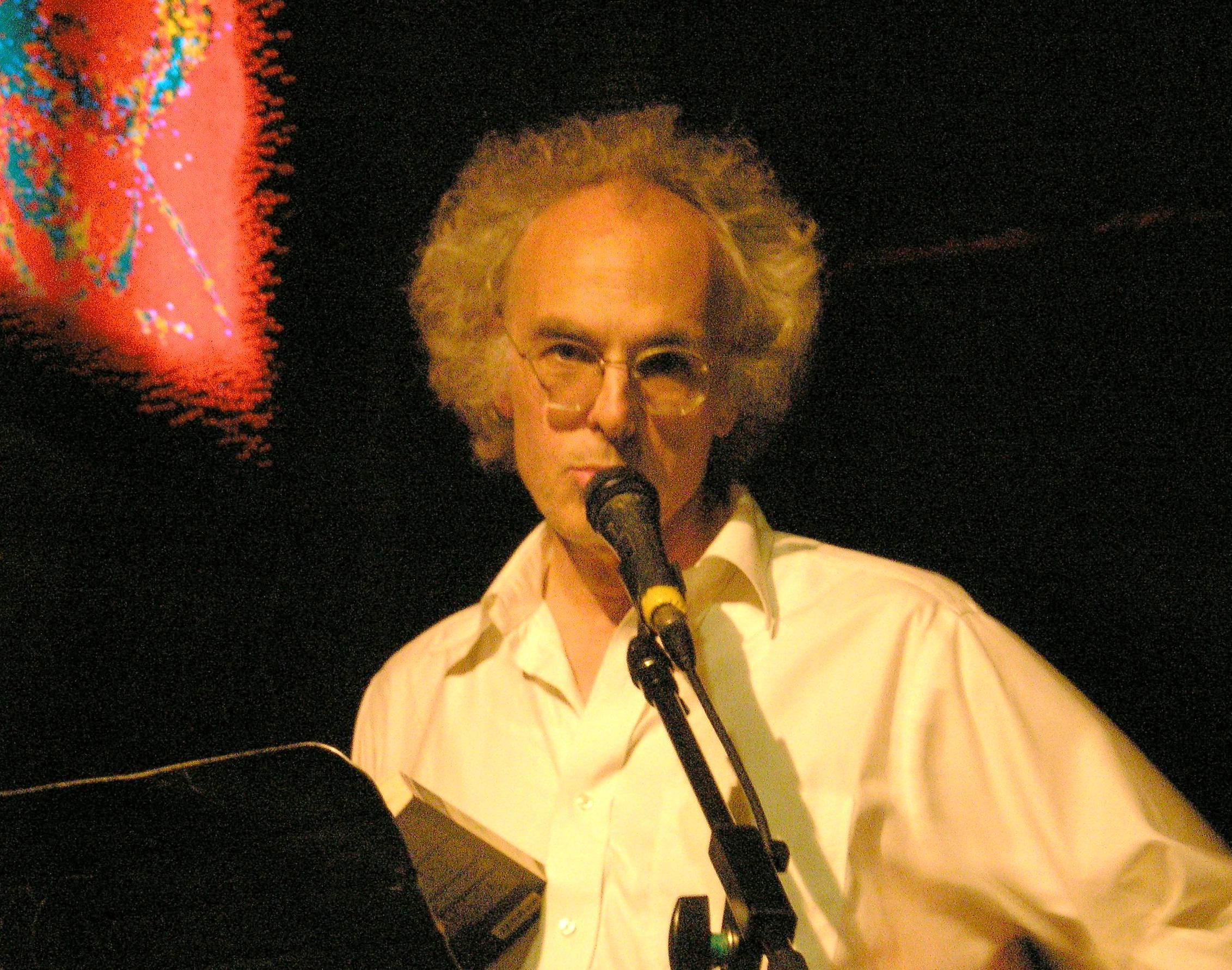
Author David Gates was a member of the 2003 Pulitzer Board triumvirate.

The novel received the Ambassador Book Award, Spain's Santiago de Compostela Literary Prize, and the Great Lakes Book Award. In 2003, it was a finalist in the fictional category of the National Book Critics Circle Award. Middlesex was also a finalist for the Lambda Literary Award, which is given to LGBT literature. In 2003, the novel was shortlisted for but did not win the International Dublin Literary Award. Entertainment Weekly, the Los Angeles Times, and The New York Times Book Review considered Middlesex to be one of the best books in 2002. In 2007, Oprah Winfrey chose Middlesex to be discussed in her book club. Eugenides was a guest on Oprah's show with several intersex individuals who told stories about their lives. In 2011, Eugenides was interviewed by University College London English professor John Mullan in The Guardian Book Club. In 2024, the New York Times ranked it as #59 of the best 100 books of the 21st century.

The audiobook version of Middlesex was released by Macmillan Audio in September 2002. Read by Kristoffer Tabori, the audiobook has 28 sides, each side having a unique style of introductory music that complements the atmosphere and plot of the saga. In 2003, the audiobook received an Audie Award in the "unabridged fiction" category.

=== Critical reception ===
Some critics were dissatisfied with the scope of the novel.

Daniel Mendelsohn of The New York Times Book Review wrote that thematically, there was no reason that a Greek should be an intersex or vice versa and that Eugenides had two disconnected stories to tell. Clay Risen of Flak Magazine believed that the immigrant experience was the "heart of the novel", lamenting that it minimized the story of Callie/Cal who is such a "fascinating character that the reader feels short-changed by his failure to take her/him further." Risen wished to read more about the events between Cal's adolescence and adulthood, such as Cal's experience in college as an intersex person as well as the relationships he had. The Washington Post's Lisa Zeidner opined that Eugenides purposefully devised this asymmetry. Stewart O'Nan of The Atlantic also felt that the brief description of Callie's childhood was lacking; the book "gloss[es] over" how her mother did not recognize that Callie had male genitalia when she was washing or clothing Callie. Further, O'Nan characterized Cal's relationship with the Japanese-American photographer Julie as "underdeveloped", causing the reader not to experience its entirety. Michelle Vellucci of People had the same view about the novel's end, writing that the conclusion felt "rushed".

Lisa Schwarzbaum of Entertainment Weekly called the novel a "big-hearted, restless story" and rated it an A minus. In Literary Review, Sam Leith called it "a marvellous, quirky and moving entertainment". Lisa Zeidner of The Washington Post opined that Middlesex "provides not only incest à la Ada and a Lolita-style road trip, but enough dense detail to keep fans of close reading manically busy." Tami Hoag of People concurred, writing that "this feast of a novel is thrilling in the scope of its imagination and surprising in its tenderness". Andrew O'Hehir of Salon agreed, praising Middlesex as an "epic and wondrous" novel filled with numerous characters and historical occurrences. Mendelsohn praised Middlesex for its "dense narrative, interwoven with sardonic, fashionably postmodern commentary." However, he criticized the novel as a disjointed hybrid. He wrote Eugenides was successful with the story of the Greek immigrants, which he described as "authenti[c]", but mishandled the hermaphrodite material, which Mendelsohn characterized as "unpersuasiv[e]". The Economist review stated that a more concise, concentrated depiction of hermaphroditism would have made the book more "fun to read". Jeff Zaleski of Publishers Weekly praised Eugenides' portrayal of the girl, Callie, and the man Cal. Zaleski wrote that "[i]t's difficult to imagine any serious male writer of earlier eras so effortlessly transcending the stereotypes of gender." Paul Quinn of Contemporary Literary Criticism commended the novel, writing: "That Eugenides manages to move us without sinking into sentiment shows how successfully he has avoided the tentacles of irony which grip so many writers of his generation." Christina McCarroll of The Christian Science Monitor wrote that "Eugenides wrangles with a destiny that mutates and recombines like restless chromosomes, in a novel of extraordinary flexibility, scope, and emotional depth."

Marta Salij of the Detroit Free Press was impressed with the book's depiction of Detroit, writing "[a]t last Detroit has its novel. What Dublin got from James Joyce—a sprawling, ambitious, loving, exasperated and playful chronicle of all its good and bad parts—Detroit has from native son Eugenides in these 500 pages." David Kipen of the San Francisco Chronicle agreed, opining "[a]mong so many other things, this praiseworthy, prize-worthy yarn succeeds as a heartbroken mash note to the Detroit of Eugenides' birth, a city whose neighborhoods he sometimes appears to love—as he loves his characters—less for their virtues than for their defects. Any book that can make a reader actively want to visit Detroit must have one honey of a tiger in its tank."

Several critics have nominated the book for the title of "Great American Novel". Tim Morris, a professor at the University of Texas at Arlington, wrote that the novel was "the latest in a long line of contenders for the status of Great American Novel", and compared Cal to Huckleberry Finn, the narrator of Invisible Man, and J. Sutter in John Henry Days. Alexander Linklater of the Evening Standard commented that American publishers chose Middlesex as the next Great American Novel to generate progress for American fiction and that Eugenides is considered the "next stepping stone along from Jonathan Franzen". Dan Cryer of Newsday wrote that with the publication of Middlesex, "[f]inally, Detroit has its very own great American novel".

David Gates of Newsweek contrasted Eugenides' debut novel The Virgin Suicides with Middlesex, writing that the first novel was "ingenious", "entertaining", and "oddly moving", but that Middlesex is "ingenious", "entertaining", and "ultimately not-so-moving". Despite this criticism, Gates considered Middlesex to be the novel where Eugenides "finally plays his metafictional ace". Commenting that Middlesex is "more discursive and funnier" than The Virgin Suicides, Laura Miller of Salon wrote that the two novels deal with disunity. Max Watman of The New Criterion concurred, noting that Middlesex is "funny, big, embracing, and wonderful", unlike Eugenides' first novel. Mark Lawson of The Guardian praised Middlesex for having the same unique qualities as The Virgin Suicides, commenting that Middlesex had "an ability to describe the horrible in a comic voice, an unusual form of narration and an eye for bizarre detail." Lawson noted that whereas Middlesex deals with the "links" among gender, life, and genes, The Virgin Suicides deals with the "connections" between gender and death.

According to Olivia Banner of Signs, medical journals generally had positive reviews of the novel for its depiction of the inner lives of intersex people. Writing in Archives of Disease in Childhood, Simon Fountain-Polley praised the novel, writing: "All clinicians, and families who have faced gender crises or difficult life-changing decision[s] on identity should read this book; delve into an emotional trip of discovery—where the slightest direction change could lead to myriad different lives." Abraham Bergman wrote in the Archives of Pediatrics & Adolescent Medicine: "Yes, it is fiction, but I cannot imagine a more authentic and sensitive voice. Because our interactions usually take place in limited and structured setting such as offices and hospitals, pediatricians have scant opportunity to learn how our young patients think. One way to sharpen our awareness is to listen to children's voices as they are expressed in books. In Middlesex, the voice is loud and clear." Banner noted that most of the reviews in intersex and queer publications praised Middlesex. She posited that the problematic issues of a "heteromasculine-identified narrator" and the "fact that it was authored by a heterosexual man" may have been outweighed by the necessity for an appropriate reading that "destigmatizes ambiguous sex".

Eugenides' third novel, The Marriage Plot, was published in 2011. Reviewer William Deresiewicz contrasted The Marriage Plot and Middlesex, writing that the former was "far more intimate in tone and scale". The Marriage Plot follows two years in the lives of three characters, fourth-year Brown University students in 1982, whereas Middlesex follows the lives of three generations of characters. Deresiewicz preferred the 2011 novel, writing that "[t]he books are far apart in quality". He criticized Middlesex for its "[c]lanking prose, clunky exposition, transparent devices, telegraphed moves", "a hash of narrative contrivances with very little on its mind." On a more positive note, Deresiewicz lauded Eugenides' colorful depiction of "young love" across his three novels. In The Virgin Suicides, Eugenides resplendently portrayed the intense fear during virginal sex, as well as Gabriel García Márquez, the 1982 Nobel Prize in Literature laureate; in Middlesex, the single event in which the novel "comes to life" is Eugenides' depiction of Callie's liaison with her adolescent lover; and in The Marriage Plot, the novel was exceptional in its "sweet banter of courtship" and the "doormat nice-boy role" the character Mitchell assumes in his interplay with his darling, Madeleine.

=== Sales ===
From the book's publication until the early months of 2003, its sales were unsatisfactory, according to Bill Goldstein of The New York Times. (Note: That the book was initially financially unsuccessful was disputed by Jana Funke in the 2009 Encyclopedia of Contemporary Writers and Their Work. She wrote that Middlesex was "both a literary and a commercial success upon initial publication".) In the week following April 7, 2003, the day Middlesex won the Pulitzer Prize, the book sold 2,700 copies. The book later made the best-selling fiction list and kept its position for five weeks. In June 2007, the novel ranked seventh on USA Today's Best-Selling Books list. In the same month, after Eugenides appeared on The Oprah Winfrey Show to discuss the novel, Middlesex placed second on The New York Times best-selling paperback fiction list. The Pulitzer award nearly propelled Middlesex to The New York Times Best Seller list, which in 2003 published only the top 15 bestsellers; in the week after Middlesex was announced the winner of the Pulitzer Prize, the novel placed 17th on the "expanded list". In 2007, 1.3 million copies of the book had been sold. The same year, the book placed ninth on the Library Journal bestsellers list, which ranks "the books most borrowed in U.S. libraries". Over three million copies of Middlesex had been sold by May 2011 and over four million by 2013.

=== Controversy ===
Middlesex has been banned or pre-emptively removed from several libraries. In 2016, the Texas Department of Criminal Justice banned Middlesex from Texas prisons. In 2023, schools in Orange County, Florida removed the book from their shelves due to that state's new laws concerning sexual content in books in school libraries.

== See also ==
- Hysterical realism
- Raptor (novel)
