= Prague Writers' Festival =

Annual literary festival in the Czech Republic

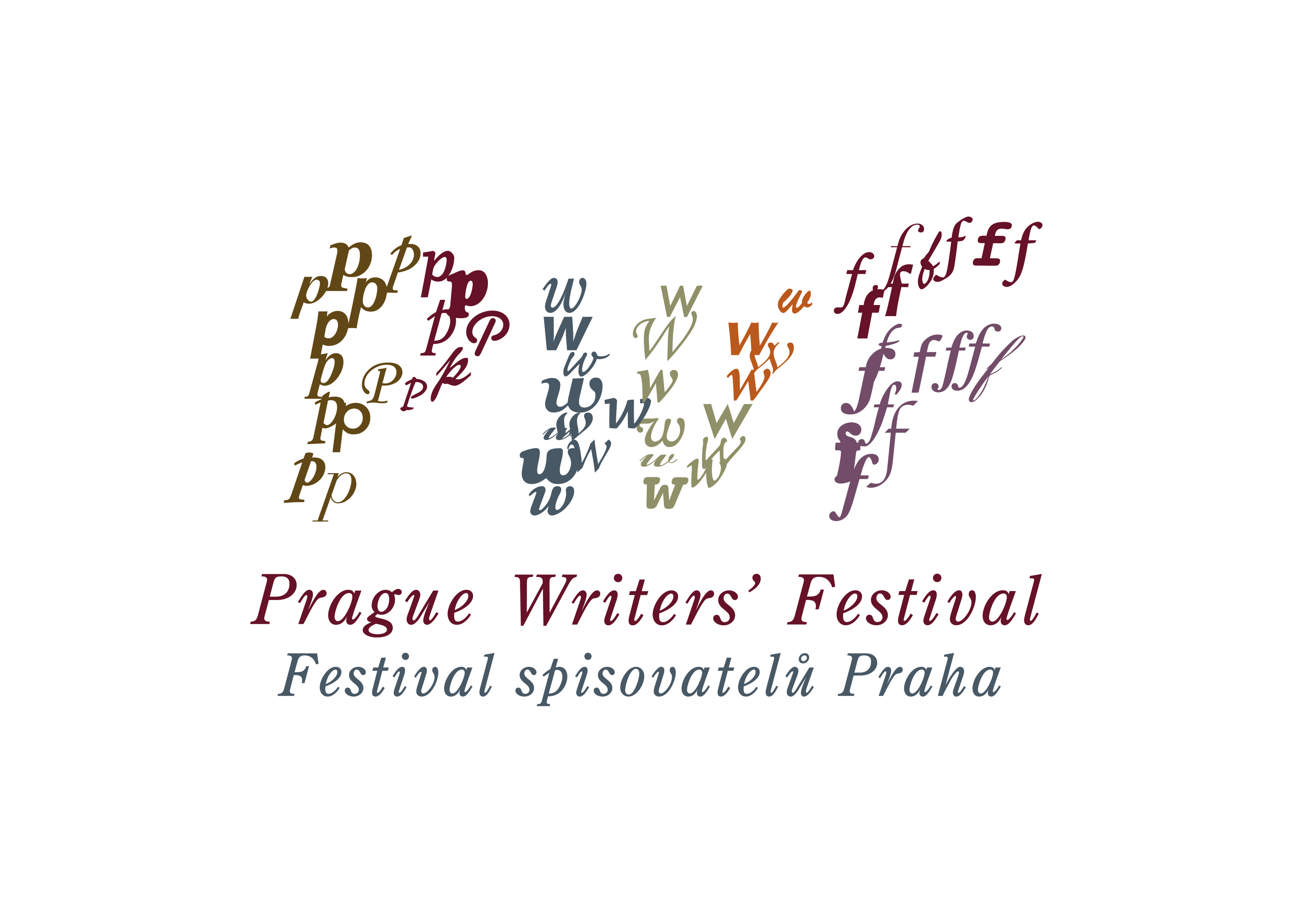
- Genre: Literature
- Locations: Prague, Czech Republic
- Years active: 1991–present
- Founded: 1991; 35 years ago
- Founders: Michael March
- Website: www.pwf.cz

The Prague Writers' Festival (PWF) (Czech: Festival spisovatelů Praha) is an annual literary festival in Prague, Czech Republic, taking place every spring since 1991. In 2005, the festival was also held in Vienna. Many of the events are broadcast via the internet. International literary figures to have appeared at the festival include John Banville, Lawrence Ferlinghetti, Salman Rushdie, Irvine Welsh, William Styron and Nadine Gordimer.

== History ==
The festival's origins are in London in the late 1970s, when PWF president Michael March began organising poetry readings at Keats House. As permitted by the Helsinki Accords, writers from the Eastern Bloc were invited to participate. After the fall of the Berlin Wall, the readings relocated to Prague, due to its reputation as "a natural host and meeting place for writers". Writers from various countries were invited to Prague as a crossroads between East and West to present their work and their culture to an international audience in the form of discussions and readings. The first Prague Writers’ Festival took place at Wallenstein Palace in May 1991 and was themed "Wedding Preparations in the Country". Over the next twenty years, Prague Writers' Festival became an increasingly important event in Prague's cultural life.

=== Themes ===
- 1991 - Wedding Preparations in the Country
- 1992 - Paradise lost
- 1993 - 1995 - without theme
- 1996 - Ancient evenings
- 1997 - dedicated to Samuel Beckett
- 1998 - dedicated to Bohumil Hrabal
- 1999 - dedicated to Vladimir Holan
- 2000 - dedicated to Jaroslav Seifert
- 2001 - dedicated to Primo Levi: "If Not Now, When?"
- 2002 - dedicated to Jean Genet
- 2003 - dedicated to William S. Burroughs: "We don't report the news. We write it."
- 2004 - dedicated to Joseph Roth: "I don't know where I'm going."
- 2005 - dedicated to Giacomo Casanova: "Our ignorance becomes our sole resource"
- 2006 - dedicated to Arthur Miller: "There is no life without ideals."
- 2007 - Dada East
- 2008 - Laughter and Forgetting
- 2009 - 2001 Nights: The Art of Storytelling
- 2010 - Heresy and Rebellion
- 2011 - Some Like It Hot
- 2012 - Only the Future Exists
- 2013 - The Birth of Nations
- 2014 - Love and Hate
- 2015 - Fear
- 2016 - Crime and Punishment
- 2017 - The Fire Next Time
- 2018 - Live — Evil
- 2019 - Beauty Saves the World
- 2020 - We are Condemned to Hope

== Activities ==
=== Festival program ===
The main focus of the festival is the public readings. Every evening during the event, authors take the stage for an "audience with" event and read excerpts from their work, each writer reading in their native language while Czech and English translations are provided simultaneously. Authors also appear in other supporting events such as book signings, concerts, or film projections. Each day a new conversation, dedicated to a literary or political subject, is held. The hour-long discussions are followed by questions from the audience.

=== Media outreach ===
The main media partner of the PWF is the British daily newspaper The Guardian, which often refers to festival events, issues, and news on its cultural pages. Many of the events are streamed live on the internet and the festival's website also hosts an archive of previous events. The festival's archives are available to the public online, in a database of Czech and English texts. One of the aims of the PWF Foundation is to secure funding for the full digitisation of its archives.

=== Other projects ===
As a cultural foundation, Prague Writers’ Festival is engaged year-round in other cultural activities. The PWF Foundation publishes books and helps to organize concerts (such as Ed Sanders and the Plastic People of the Universe) and movie screenings, as well as art exhibitions (such as Dada East? and The World in 1968).

The Prague Writers’ Festival offers discount tickets and other benefits to high school classes, and also works in partnership with principals and teachers at local schools to organise the annual Walter Serner Short Story Prize. By virtue of its focus on humanities, languages, and literature, the festival also has a long-standing partnership with several Czech universities and with the University of New York in Prague. It also cooperates with students from Charles University, Masaryk University and the Prague College of Journalism to arrange activities for the festival.

== Notable guests ==
=== Nobel Prize Winners ===
- Gao Xingjian France, China, Guest PWF 2009, Nobel Prize 2000
- Wole Soyinka Nigeria, Guest PWF 2006 & 2020, Nobel Prize 1986
- Nadine Gordimer South Africa, Guest PWF 2004, Nobel Prize 1991
- Harold Pinter Great Britain, Guest PWF 1999, Nobel Prize 2005
- José Saramago Portugal, Guest PWF 1994, Nobel Prize 1998
- Herta Müller Germany, Guest PWF 1999, Nobel Prize 2009
- Derek Walcott Saint Lucia, Guest PWF 2011, Nobel Prize 1992
- Orhan Pamuk Turkey, Guest PWF 2013, Nobel Prize 2006
- Günter Grass Germany, Guest PWF 2013, Nobel Prize 1999
- J. M. Coetzee Australia, Guest PWF 2016, Nobel Prize 2003
- Svetlana Alexievich Belarus, Guest PWF 2014, Nobel Prize 2015

=== Man Booker Prize Winners ===
- Margaret Atwood Canada, PWF 2008, Man Booker Prize 2000 for The Blind Assassin
- Nadine Gordimer South Africa, PWF 2004, Man Booker Prize 1974 for The Conservationist
- Arundhati Roy India, PWF 2003, Man Booker Prize 1997 for The God of Small Things
- Yann Martel Canada, PWF 2003, Man Booker Prize 2002 for Life of Pi
- Salman Rushdie India, United Kingdom, PWF 2001, Man Booker Prize for Midnight's Children
- Ian McEwan United Kingdom, PWF 2001, Man Booker Prize 1998 for Amsterdam
- John Banville Ireland, PWF 2001, Man Booker Prize 2005 for The Sea

=== Pulitzer Prize Winners ===
- William Styron USA, PWF 2006, Pulitzer Prize 1968 for The Confessions of Nat Turner
- Jeffrey Eugenides USA, PWF 2003, Pulitzer Prize 2003 for Middlesex
- Richard Ford USA, PWF 2000, Pulitzer Prize 1996 for Independence Day
- Michael Cunningham USA, PWF 1994, Pulitzer Prize 1999 for The Hours
- Junot Díaz Dominican Republic, PWF 2011, Pulitzer Prize 2008 for The Brief Wondrous Life of Oscar Wao

== See also ==
- Designblok
