= Fresh Complaint =

Fresh Complaint: Stories
- Cover of first edition
- Author: Jeffrey Eugenides
- Audio read by: Jeffrey Eugenides; Ari Fliakos; Cynthia Nixon
- Cover artist: Na Kim
- Language: English
- Publisher: Farrar, Straus and Giroux
- Publication date: October 3, 2017
- Publication place: United States
- Media type: Print (hardcover)
- Pages: 304
- ISBN: 978-0-374-20306-1
- OCLC: 968639386
- Dewey Decimal: 813/.54
- LC Class: PS3555.U4 A6 2017

Fresh Complaint: Stories is a 2017 collection of short stories by American writer Jeffrey Eugenides.

== Contents ==
It comprises ten stories, eight of which had previously been "published in magazines and literary journals between 1989 and 2013".

Title	Originally published in
"Complainers"	
"Air Mail"	The Yale Review, October 1996
"Baster"	The New Yorker, June 17, 1996
"Early Music"	The New Yorker, October 10, 2005
"Timeshare"	Conjunctions 28, Spring 1997
"Find the Bad Guy"	The New Yorker, November 18, 2013
"The Oracular Vulva"	The New Yorker, June 21, 1999
"Capricious Gardens"	The Gettysburg Review, Winter 1989
"Great Experiment"	The New Yorker, March 31, 2008
"Fresh Complaint"	

== Audiobook ==
The audiobook is read by Jeffrey Eugenides, Ari Fliakos, and Cynthia Nixon.
