= The Virgin Suicides (film) =

1999 film directed by Sofia Coppola

- Theatrical release poster
- Directed by: Sofia Coppola
- Screenplay by: Sofia Coppola
- Based on: The Virgin Suicides by Jeffrey Eugenides
- Produced by: Francis Ford Coppola; Julie Costanzo; Chris Hanley; Dan Halsted
- Starring: James Woods; Kathleen Turner; Kirsten Dunst; Josh Hartnett; Scott Glenn; A.J. Cook; Hanna R. Hall; Michael Paré; Danny DeVito
- Cinematography: Edward Lachman
- Edited by: James Lyons; Melissa Kent
- Music by: Air
- Production companies: American Zoetrope; Muse Productions; Eternity Pictures
- Distributed by: Paramount Classics
- Release dates: May 19, 1999 (Cannes); April 21, 2000 (United States)
- Running time: 97 minutes
- Country: United States
- Language: English
- Budget: $9 million
- Box office: $10.4 million

The Virgin Suicides is a 1999 American psychological drama film written and directed by Sofia Coppola in her feature directorial debut, and co-produced by her father, Francis Ford Coppola. Based on the 1993 debut novel by Jeffrey Eugenides, it stars James Woods, Kathleen Turner, Kirsten Dunst, A.J. Cook, and Josh Hartnett, with Scott Glenn, Michael Paré, Jonathan Tucker, and Danny DeVito in supporting roles. The film follows the lives of five adolescent sisters in an upper-middle-class suburb of Detroit in 1975.

Shot in 1998 in Toronto, it features an original score by the French electronic band Air. The film marked the first collaboration between Coppola and Dunst, whom Coppola later cast as the lead in several of her subsequent films.

The Virgin Suicides premiered at the 1999 Cannes Film Festival on May 19, 1999, and received a limited theatrical release by Paramount Classics in the United States on April 21, 2000, later expanding to a wide release on May 19, 2000. The film earned largely positive reviews from critics, with the performances of the cast, Coppola's direction, visual style, and soundtrack receiving praise. It has been acclaimed for its lyrical representation of adolescent angst, and is recognized as a cult classic. In 2015, the film ranked No. 39 on Entertainment Weekly's list of the "50 Best High School Movies".

== Plot ==
In the sleepy suburb of Grosse Pointe, Michigan, a group of neighborhood boys — now grown men — reflect upon their memories of the five Lisbon sisters, ages 13 to 17, in 1974. Unattainable due to their overprotective Catholic parents, math teacher Ronald Lisbon and his homemaker wife Sara, the girls — Cecilia, Lux, Bonnie, Mary, and Therese — fill the boys' conversations and dreams.

During the summer, the youngest sister, Cecilia, slits her wrist in a bathtub, but survives. Her therapist, Dr. Horniker, suggests to her parents that her suicide attempt was a cry for help, and she would benefit from wider interaction with her peers, particularly boys. Despite that, Mrs. Lisbon is unwilling to allow her daughters a normal social life. Mr. Lisbon persuades her to allow a chaperoned party to make Cecilia feel better. However, after other boys make fun of Joe, a teenager with Down syndrome, Cecilia excuses herself and takes her own life by leaping from her second-story bedroom window, impaling herself on a spiked iron fencepost below.

Afterwards, the Lisbon parents watch over their remaining daughters even more closely. This further isolates the family and heightens the air of mystery surrounding the girls, particularly to the neighborhood boys. At the beginning of the school year, Lux, the most rebellious sister, enters into a secret, short-lived romance with Trip Fontaine, the school heartthrob. In hopes of becoming closer to her, he comes over to the Lisbons' and watches television with the family.

Trip convinces Mr. Lisbon to let him take Lux to the homecoming dance by promising to provide dates for Bonnie, Mary, and Therese, and going as a group, to which their parents agree, with Mr. Lisbon chaperoning the dance. After being voted homecoming king and queen, Trip persuades Lux to ditch their group and take a walk on the football field, where they have sex. Afterwards, she falls asleep and he abandons her. At dawn, Lux wakes up alone and takes a taxi home, where she is met by her distraught parents.

Due to Lux breaking curfew, the girls are all punished, taken out of school and confined to the family home. By using flashlight signals and playing records over the telephone, they share their feelings with the group of neighborhood boys. Lux rebels and becomes promiscuous, having anonymous sexual encounters on her house's roof late at night with a succession of boys and men; the boys spy on her from across the street. After months of confinement, the sisters begin to leave notes outside for the boys.

These culminate in a final note asking them to come over at midnight, ostensibly to help the Lisbon sisters escape from their house. When the boys finally arrive that night, they find Lux alone in the living room, smoking a cigarette. Thinking they are going to help the girls escape, the boys are invited inside by her to wait for her sisters while she goes to start the car.

Curious, the boys wander into the basement after hearing a noise and discover Bonnie's body hanging from the rafters. Horrified, they rush back upstairs, only to stumble across the body of Mary in the kitchen, where she has put her head in the gas oven. The boys realize the girls have all killed themselves in an apparent suicide pact: Therese overdosed on sleeping pills upstairs, and Lux died of carbon monoxide poisoning by leaving the car engine running in the closed garage.

Devastated by the suicides of all their children, Mr. and Mrs. Lisbon quietly flee the neighborhood and are never seen again. Mr. Lisbon has a coworker clean out the house and sell the family belongings in a yard sale; family photos and other mementos are put out with the trash and collected by the boys. The house is eventually sold to a young couple from Boston.

Unsure of how to react to the events, the adults in the community go about their lives as if nothing traumatic happened, or even making fun of the suicides, but the boys cannot stop thinking about the Lisbon sisters and why they did what they did. Now adult men themselves, they acknowledge that they had loved the girls, and that the mystery surrounding their deaths will torment them for the rest of their lives.

== Cast ==
- James Woods as Mr. Lisbon
- Kathleen Turner as Mrs. Lisbon
- Kirsten Dunst as Lux Lisbon
- Josh Hartnett as Trip Fontaine
- A.J. Cook as Mary Lisbon
- Hanna R. Hall as Cecilia Lisbon
- Leslie Hayman as Therese Lisbon
- Chelse Swain as Bonnie Lisbon
- Anthony Desimone as Chase Buell
- Lee Kagan as David Barker
- Robert Schwartzman as Paul Baldino
- Noah Shebib as Parkie Denton
- Jonathan Tucker as Tim Weiner
- Michael Paré as Adult Trip Fontaine
- Scott Glenn as Father Moody
- Danny DeVito as Dr. Horniker
- Hayden Christensen as Jake Hill Conley
- Giovanni Ribisi as The Narrator

== Production ==
=== Conception ===
Coppola wrote the script for the film in 1998 after the project was already greenlit at another studio, adapting it from the source novel, of which she was a fan. Another script had already been written by Nick Gomez, but the production company that owned the rights at the time, Muse Productions, was dissatisfied with it. After the rights to the novel lapsed, Coppola pitched her manuscript to Muse executives Roberta and Chris Hanley, the latter of whom signed on to co-produce. Coppola was inspired to write the film after reading the source novel: "I really didn't know I wanted to be a director until I read The Virgin Suicides and saw so clearly how it had to be done," she said. "I immediately saw the central story as being about what distance and time and memory do to you, and about the extraordinary power of the unfathomable."

=== Casting ===
Kathleen Turner was the first actor to sign on to the project, playing the Lisbon girls' oppressive mother; Turner had known Coppola after they appeared together in Peggy Sue Got Married (1986). James Woods was cast opposite Turner as the passive father. Woods was given the script by Coppola's father, Francis, and was so impressed by the script and the character's "dark humor" that he agreed to play the role. For the part of Lux, Coppola auditioned numerous actresses but had a "gut choice" of Kirsten Dunst, who was sixteen years old at the time of her casting. Reflecting on the role, Dunst said, "I was nervous. It was my first role that was more of a 'sexy' thing. I was also unsure about how large the role was gonna be, because a lot of it was without dialogue. When I met Sofia, I immediately knew that she would handle it in a delicate way... [she] really brought out the luminous aspect of the girls; she made them like ethereal angels, almost like they weren't really there."

=== Filming ===
The Virgin Suicides was filmed in the summer of 1998 in Toronto standing in for suburban Detroit, on a reported budget of $6 million. The shoot lasted roughly one month.

Coppola was inspired by photographer Takashi Homma's photos of suburban Japan when choosing the filming locations; "I have always been struck by the beauty of banal details," she said, "and that is what suburban style is all about." The film's occasional use of stills and collages was intended to evoke the "fantasia" of adolescence. Cinematographer Edward Lachman shot the film. Coppola's brother, Roman Coppola, was the second-unit director on the film. The film was also visually inspired by Peter Weir's 1975 film Picnic at Hanging Rock.

== Music ==
French electronic music duo Air composed the musical score for The Virgin Suicides. Coppola did not want the hits from the 1970s, but rather a "consistent soundtrack" that suited the theme of the film, which led Air to be on board. She wanted to convey the theme of adolescence in the suburbs in the soundtrack. She found that Air shared many of her suburban memories and experiences even though they grew up in a different country.

Air's score was released on February 23, 2000, by Virgin Records, to critical acclaim and has been considered as one of the "best film scores/rock albums". The film features songs by 1970s-era performers and five tracks from the 1990s by Sloan. A separate soundtrack album was released on March 28, 2000, featuring music from Todd Rundgren, Heart, Sloan, The Hollies, Al Green, Gilbert O'Sullivan, 10cc, Styx, and two tracks by Air (one previously recorded; one composed for the film). The deluxe edition of the film score was released in June 2015, and a vinyl re-issue was published by Rhino Records in 2020.

== Themes ==
Nicola Sayers said The Virgin Suicides is a 1970s nostalgia film.

== Release ==
The film had its world premiere at the Cannes Film Festival on May 19, 1999. It was given a limited theatrical release in the United States almost a year later on April 21, 2000. The theatrical release would expand to a wide release in May 2000.

=== Home media ===
The film was released on VHS and DVD through Paramount Home Entertainment on December 19, 2000. On April 24, 2018, a remastered version of the film was released on DVD and Blu-ray Disc via The Criterion Collection, featuring new interviews, a behind-the-scenes documentary, an essay, among other features. A 4K Ultra HD Blu-ray release from Criterion followed on July 5, 2022.

== Reception ==
=== Critical response ===
The Virgin Suicides received positive reviews from film critics, though some noted the film's discomforting thematic material. It holds an 80% approval rating on review aggregator website Rotten Tomatoes, based on 106 reviews. The website's critical consensus reads, "The Virgin Suicides drifts with a dreamlike melancholy that may strike some audiences as tedious, but Sofia Coppola's feature debut is a mature meditation on disaffected youth." On Metacritic, the film holds a rating of 77 out of 100, based on 31 critics, indicating "generally favorable reviews". Jeffrey Eugenides visited the set of the film for three days. He supported the film but did offer a few critiques in an interview with Dazed. Eugenides envisioned the girls as more of an entity than actual people; he believed this idea could have been accomplished by casting different actresses to play the same character, with each actress changing depending on whom they are speaking to.

Graham Fuller of The New York Times gave the film a middling review, writing, "Ms. Coppola has made [...] a haunting metaphysical celebration of adolescence with the aura of a myth. Yet, on the surface, there is something wrong with this picture: how can a film in which a quintet of apparently normal girls commit suicide possibly be a celebration, and why would a filmmaker attempt to make it so unless she is uncommonly perverse?" Kevin Thomas of the Los Angeles Times gave the film a positive review, praising Coppola's direction, the cast, and the production design, but also noting that while the film "is successfully venturesome... you need to know that it's also a real downer." Roger Ebert gave the film three-and-a-half out of four stars and positively compared it to Picnic at Hanging Rock (1975): "[Coppola] has the courage to play it in a minor key," he notes. "She doesn't hammer home ideas and interpretations. She is content with the air of mystery and loss that hangs in the air like bitter poignancy."

Ed Gonzalez of Slant Magazine noted the film's dreamy, childlike nature, writing, "The narrator speaks of youth as if it existed and still exists in a near-fugue state. In this respect, the film is as much a relevant view of adolescence and male/female relations as it is an act of remembrance. Scenes from the film (first kisses, gossiping about neighbors) are sinewy in nature and seem lifted from the pages of a lost photo album." Critic Richard Crouse called the film "one of those rare occasions when a film surpasses the book it is based on" and included it in his book The 100 Best Movies You've Never Seen (2003). In 2025, it was one of the films voted for the "Readers' Choice" edition of The New York Times' list of "The 100 Best Movies of the 21st Century", finishing at number 314.

=== Accolades ===
Accolades for The Virgin Suicides
Award	Date of ceremony	Category	Recipient(s)	Result	Ref.
Brit Awards	February 26, 2001	Soundtrack/Cast Recording	Air	Nominated	
Cannes Film Festival	May 23, 1999	Caméra d'Or	Sofia Coppola	Nominated	
Cannes Film Festival	May 23, 1999	C.I.C.A.E. Award	The Virgin Suicides	Nominated	
Casting Society of America	November 1, 2000	Independent Feature Film Casting	Linda Phillips Palo, Robert McGee	Won	
Chicago Film Critics Association	February 26, 2001	Best Original Score	Air	Nominated	
Las Vegas Film Critics Society	December 21, 2000	Best Director	Sofia Coppola	Nominated	
Las Vegas Film Critics Society	December 21, 2000	Best Adapted Screenplay	Sofia Coppola	Nominated	
Las Vegas Film Critics Society	December 21, 2000	Best Supporting Actor	James Woods	Nominated	
Las Vegas Film Critics Society	December 21, 2000	Best Cinematography	Edward Lachman	Nominated	
Las Vegas Film Critics Society	December 21, 2000	Best Female Newcomer	Sofia Coppola	Nominated	
MTV Movie Awards	June 2, 2001	Best New Filmmaker	Sofia Coppola	Won	
Teen Choice Awards	August 6, 2000	Choice Movie Actress	Kirsten Dunst	Nominated	
Young Hollywood Awards	April 29, 2001	Best Director	Sofia Coppola	Won	
YoungStar Awards	November 19, 2000	Best Young Actress in a Drama Film	Kirsten Dunst	Nominated	
Empire Awards	February 19, 2001	Best Debut	Sofia Coppola	Nominated	
Chlotrudis Awards	2001	Best Adapted Screenplay	Sofia Coppola	Nominated	
Cahiers du Cinéma	2000	Top 10 Film Award	The Virgin Suicides	7th Place	
