= The Virgin Suicides =

1993 novel by Jeffrey Eugenides

- First edition
- Author: Jeffrey Eugenides
- Language: English
- Genre: Thriller
- Publisher: Farrar, Straus and Giroux
- Publication date: 1993
- Publication place: United States
- Media type: Print (hardback & paperback)
- Pages: 249
- ISBN: 0-374-28438-5
- OCLC: 26806717
- Dewey Decimal: 813/.54 20
- LC Class: PS3555.U4 V57 1993

The Virgin Suicides is a coming-of-age thriller novel and the debut novel by American writer Jeffrey Eugenides, published in 1993. The story, which is set in Grosse Pointe, Michigan during the 1970s, centers on the lives of five doomed sisters, the Lisbon girls. The novel is written in first person plural from the perspective of an anonymous group of teenage boys who struggle to find an explanation for the Lisbons' deaths. The novel's first chapter appeared in The Paris Review in 1990, and won the 1991 Aga Khan Prize for Fiction. The novel was adapted into a 1999 movie by director Sofia Coppola, starring Kirsten Dunst.

== Plot summary ==
In 1975, as an ambulance arrives for the body of Mary Lisbon, the last Lisbon sister to die, a group of anonymous adolescent neighborhood boys recalls the events leading up to her death.

The Lisbons are a Catholic family living in the suburb of Grosse Pointe, Michigan. The father, Ronald Lisbon, is a math teacher at the local high school. The mother is a strict homemaker. The family has five blonde teenage daughters: 13-year-old Cecilia, 14-year-old Lux, 15-year-old Bonnie, 16-year-old Mary, and 17-year-old Therese.

About a year before Mary’s death, without warning, Cecilia attempts suicide by slitting her wrists in the bathtub. However, she is found in time by a neighborhood boy who had snuck into the home, and survives. Cecilia's psychologist at the hospital suggests that the girls need more social interaction and that the potential cause of Cecilia's suicide attempt was the suppression of her libidinal urges. The parents allow the girls to throw a chaperoned party at their house in hopes of cheering Cecilia up. However, Cecilia excuses herself from the party, which is happening in the basement, and goes upstairs and jumps out of her second-story bedroom window. Cecilia is impaled on the fence post below, and she dies almost immediately.

The Lisbon parents, particularly Mrs. Lisbon, begin to watch their four remaining daughters more closely, further isolating the family from their community. Cecilia's death also heightens the air of mystery about the Lisbon sisters to the neighborhood boys, who long for more insight into the girls' lives.

When school begins in the fall, Lux begins a secret romance with the local heartthrob, Trip Fontaine. Trip negotiates with the overprotective Mr. and Mrs. Lisbon to take Lux to the homecoming dance, on the condition that he find dates for the other three sisters as well. After winning homecoming King and Queen, Trip persuades Lux to ditch their group to have sex on the school's football field. Afterward, Trip abandons Lux, who falls asleep and misses her curfew. Trip and Lux never speak again.

Mrs. Lisbon withdraws the girls from school and keeps them home in what the boys describe as "maximum security isolation". Mr. Lisbon is also fired from his teaching job over concerns from the parents of other students.

Through the winter, Lux is seen by the anonymous teen boys having sex on the roof of the Lisbon residence with unnamed and unknown men at night. The tight-knit community gossip and watch as the Lisbons' lives deteriorate without intervention. After many months of strict confinement, the remaining four sisters reach out to the boys across the street by using light signals and sending anonymous notes. The boys decide to call the Lisbon girls and communicate by playing records over the telephone for the girls to share and express their feelings.

Finally, one night the girls send a message to the boys to come over at midnight, leading the boys to believe that they will help the girls escape. Upon entering the house they are met by Lux, who invites them inside and tells them to wait for her sisters while she goes to start the car. As the boys wait, they explore the house. In the Lisbon basement, the boys discover Bonnie hanging from a rope tied to the ceiling rafters. Horrified, the boys flee the home.

In the morning, the authorities come for the dead bodies, as the girls had apparently made a suicide pact: Bonnie hanged herself, Therese overdosed on sleeping pills, and Lux died of carbon monoxide poisoning after sealing herself inside the garage with the car running. Mary, who had put her head in the gas oven, survives the attempt and lives for another month. She finally succeeds in ending her life by overdosing on sleeping pills. The adults in the community go on as if nothing happened. Local newspaper writer Linda Perl notes that the suicides came exactly one year after Cecilia's first attempt and describes the girls as tragic creatures who were so cut off from life that death was not much of a change.

After the funerals, Mr. and Mrs. Lisbon leave Grosse Pointe and eventually divorce. The Lisbon house is sold to a young couple from the Boston area. All the furniture and personal belongings of the Lisbons are thrown out or sold during a garage sale. The narrators scavenge through the trash to collect mementos they will forever save as keepsakes. 20-something years later, as middle-aged men with families, they lament the suicides as selfish acts from which they have secretly not been able to emotionally recover. The novel closes with the now-grown men confessing that they had loved the girls but had never truly understood them and that they will never know the true motives behind the suicides.

== Film adaptation ==
Sofia Coppola wrote the screenplay for and directed a 97-minute film version, which was shot in the summer of 1998, and released on May 19, 1999 at the Cannes Film Festival. The Virgin Suicides was Sofia Coppola's feature directorial debut. The film then opened on April 21, 2000, in New York, San Francisco, and Los Angeles. The film starred Kirsten Dunst, James Woods, Kathleen Turner, and Josh Hartnett. The film is faithful to the novel; much of the dialogue and narration is taken verbatim from its source. The film received favorable reviews and was rated R for strong thematic elements involving teens.

The French band Air created the score to the film, also entitled The Virgin Suicides.

== Background ==
The inspiration for the plot of the book came to Jeffrey Eugenides when his nephew's teenage babysitter told him that she and her sisters had planned to commit suicide. When Eugenides asked why, the babysitter only replied, "we were under a lot of pressure." Eugenides talks about this inspiration in his YouTube interview with The Paris Review.

Eugenides told 3am Magazine: "I think that if my name hadn't been Eugenides, people wouldn't have called the narrator a Greek chorus".

Several writers have also noted the similarities between The Virgin Suicides and the 1945 play The House of Bernarda Alba by Federico García Lorca.

== Censorship ==
In April 2025, the Lukashenko regime added the book to the "list of printed publications containing information messages and materials, the distribution of which could harm the national interests of Belarus".
