= Jeffrey Eugenides =

American novelist and short story writer (born 1960)

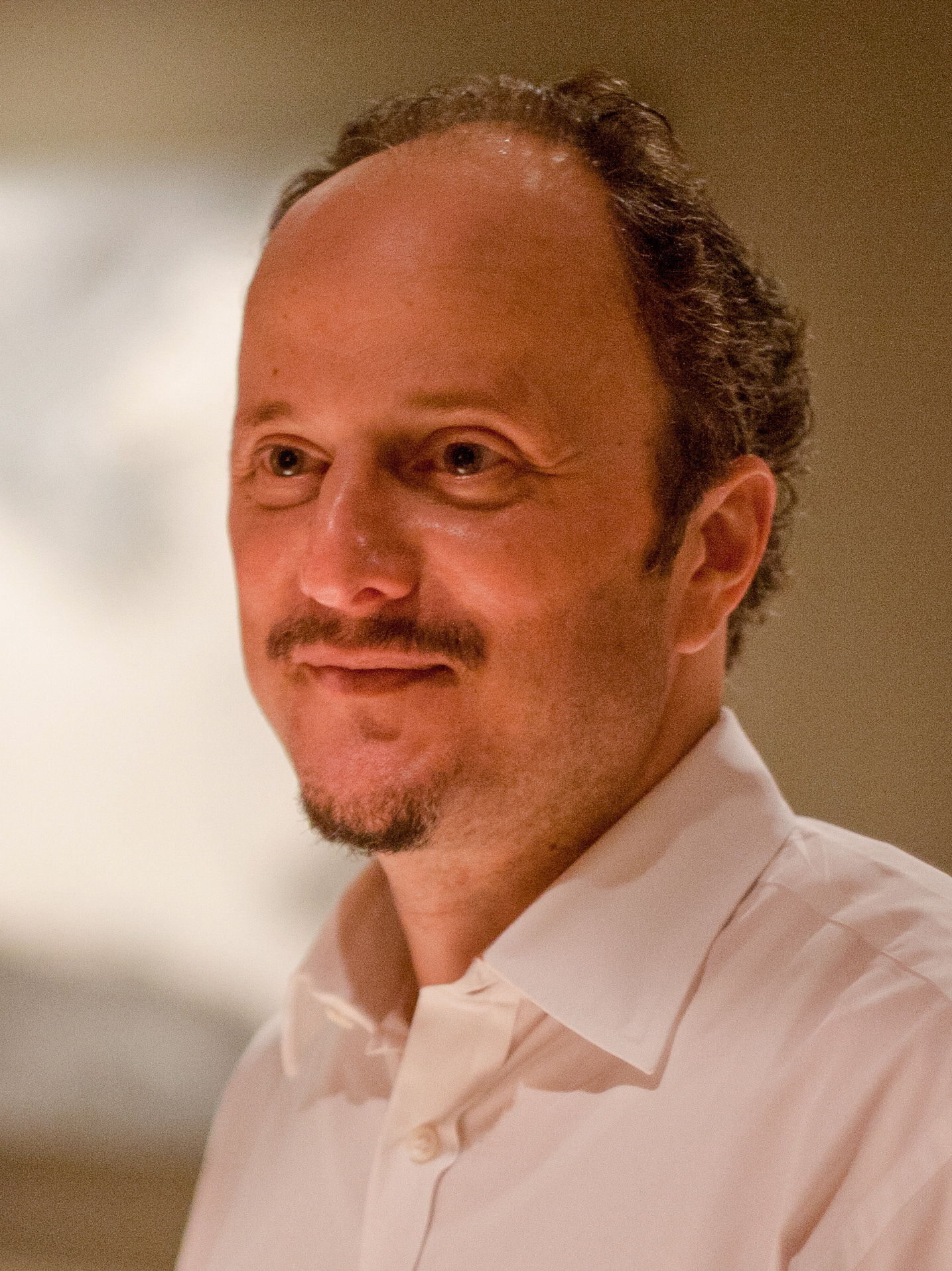
- Eugenides in October 2012
- Born: March 8, 1960 (age 66); Detroit, Michigan, U.S.
- Education: Brown University (AB); Stanford University (MA)
- Occupation: Author
- Children: 1
- Relatives: Kallie Branciforte (niece)
- Writing career
- Genre: Fiction
- Notable work: Middlesex (2002)
- Notable awards: Pulitzer Prize for Fiction (2003); Prix Fitzgerald for The Marriage Plot

Jeffrey Kent Eugenides (born March 8, 1960) is an American author. He has written numerous short stories and essays, as well as three novels: The Virgin Suicides (1993), Middlesex (2002), and The Marriage Plot (2011). The Virgin Suicides served as the basis of the 1999 film, while Middlesex received the 2003 Pulitzer Prize for Fiction in addition to being a finalist for the National Book Critics Circle Award, the International Dublin Literary Award, and France's Prix Médicis.

== Biography ==
Jeffrey Kent Eugenides was born in Detroit, Michigan, on March 8, 1960. He is of Greek descent through his father and English and Irish descent through his mother. He has two older brothers. He attended Grosse Pointe's private University Liggett School and then Brown University (where he became friends with contemporary Rick Moody). He graduated from Brown in 1982 after taking a year off to travel across Europe, during which time he also volunteered with Mother Teresa in Calcutta. Of his decision to study at Brown, he said, "I chose Brown largely in order to study with John Hawkes, whose work I admired. I entered the honors program in English, which forced me to study the entire English tradition, beginning with Beowulf. I felt that since I was going to try to add to the tradition, I had better know something about it." In 1986, he earned an M.A. in English and Creative Writing from Stanford University. Eugenides knew he wanted to be a writer from a relatively early age, stating,

"I decided very early; during my junior year of high school. We read A Portrait of the Artist as a Young Man that year, and it had a big effect on me, for reasons that seem quite amusing to me now. I'm half Irish and half Greek—my mother's family were Kentuckians, Southern hillbillies, and my paternal grandparents immigrants from Asia Minor—and, for that reason, I identified with Stephen Dedalus. Like me, he was bookish, good at academics, and possessed an 'absurd name, an ancient Greek'. [...] I do remember thinking [...] that to be a writer was the best thing a person could be. It seemed to promise maximum alertness to life. It seemed holy to me, and almost religious."

Of his earliest literary influences, he cited "the great modernists. Joyce, Proust, Faulkner. From these I went on to discover Musil, Woolf, and others, and soon my friends and I were reading Pynchon and John Barth. My generation grew up backward. We were weaned on experimental writing before ever reading much of the nineteenth-century literature the modernists and postmodernists were reacting against."

Eugenides was raised in Detroit and cites the influence of the city and his high school experiences on his writings. He has said that he has "a perverse love" of his birthplace: "I think most of the major elements of American history are exemplified in Detroit, from the triumph of the automobile and the assembly line to the blight of racism, not to mention the music, Motown, the MC5, house, techno." He also says he has been "haunted" by the decline of Detroit. In 1983, after graduating from Brown, he moved to San Francisco with the intention of becoming a writer and lived on Haight Street.

In 1986, he received the Academy of Motion Picture Arts and Sciences Nicholl Fellowship for his story "Here Comes Winston, Full of the Holy Spirit." After living a few years in San Francisco, he moved to Brooklyn, New York and worked as secretary for the Academy of American Poets. While in New York he made friends with numerous similarly struggling writers, including Jonathan Franzen.

From 1999 to 2004, Eugenides lived in Berlin, where he moved after being awarded a grant from the German Academic Exchange Service to write in Berlin for a year. Since 2007, he has lived in Princeton, New Jersey, where he moved after he joined the faculty of Princeton University's Program in Creative Writing.

Of teaching creative writing, Eugenides remarked in an interview with The Paris Review, "I tell my students that when you write, you should pretend you're writing the best letter you ever wrote to the smartest friend you have. That way, you'll never dumb things down. You won't have to explain things that don't need explaining. You'll assume an intimacy and a natural shorthand, which is good because readers are smart and don't wish to be condescended to. I think about the reader. I care about the reader. Not 'audience.' Not 'readership.' Just the reader."

In 2018, Eugenides joined New York University's Creative Writing Program as a tenured full professor and the Lewis and Loretta Glucksman Professor in American Letters.

Eugenides met his former wife, photographer and sculptor Karen Yamauchi, at the MacDowell artist's program. They got married in 1995 and later had a daughter named Georgia Eugenides.

After being raised in a nominally Greek Orthodox household, in 2022 Eugenides was received into the Catholic Church.

== Career ==
=== The Virgin Suicides ===
Eugenides's 1993 novel, The Virgin Suicides, has been translated into 34 languages. In 1999, the novel was adapted into a critically acclaimed film directed by Sofia Coppola. Set in Grosse Pointe, Michigan, the novel follows the lives and deaths by suicide of five sisters over the course of an increasingly isolated year, as told from the point of view of the neighborhood boys who obsessively watch them.

=== 1996–2001 ===
Eugenides published short stories in the nine years between The Virgin Suicides and Middlesex, primarily in The New Yorker. His 1996 story "Baster" became the basis for the 2010 romantic comedy The Switch. Eugenides temporarily put Middlesex aside in the late '90s to begin work on a novel that would eventually serve as the basis for his third. Two excerpts of what became Eugenides's work-in-progress third novel after Middlesex also appeared in The New Yorker in 2011, "Asleep in the Lord" and "Extreme Solitude." Eugenides also served as the editor of the collection of short stories titled My Mistress's Sparrow Is Dead. The proceeds of the collection go to the writing center 826 Chicago, established to encourage young people's writing.

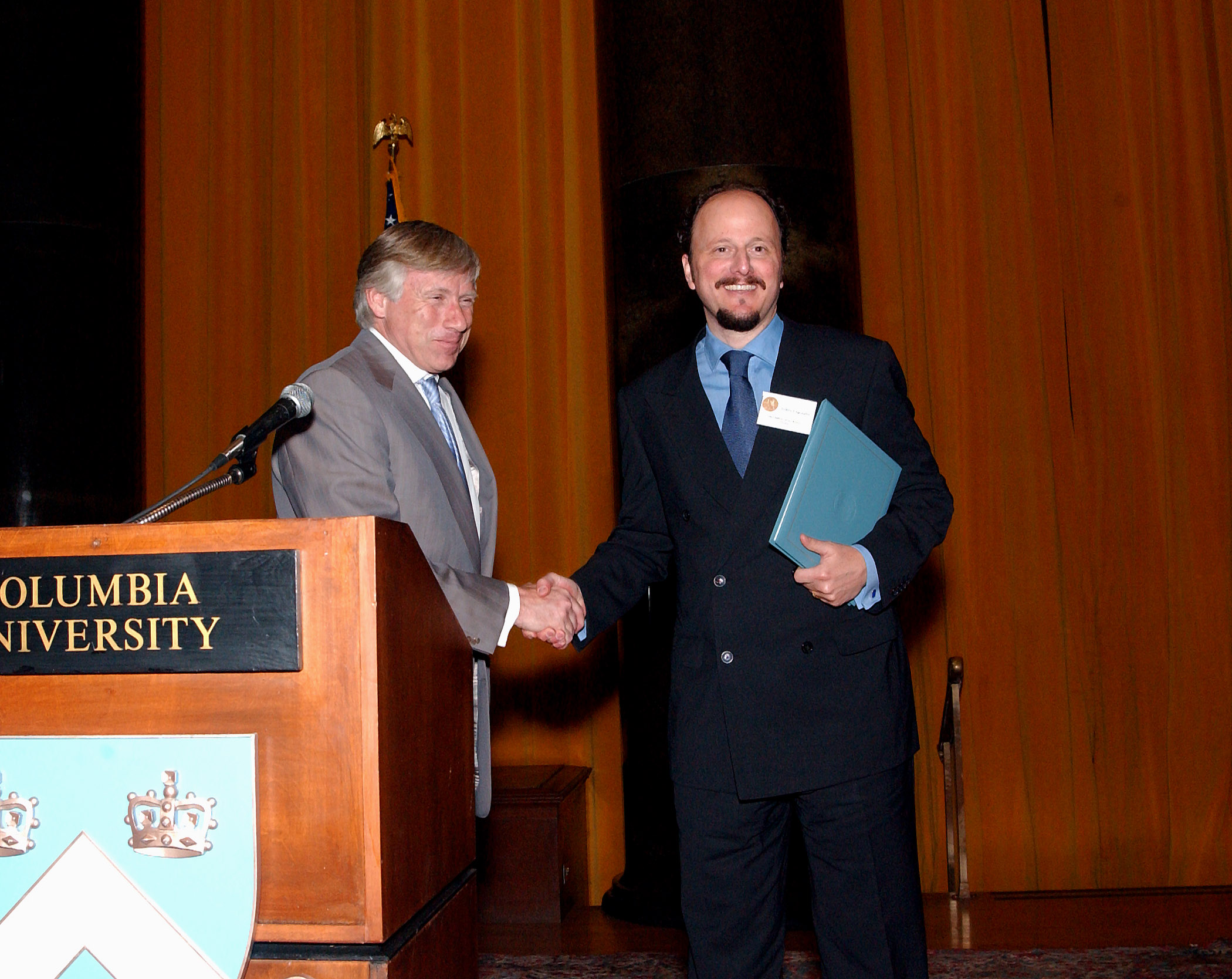
Columbia University President Lee C. Bollinger presenting Jeffrey Eugenides the 2003 Pulitzer Prize in Fiction for his novel, Middlesex

=== Middlesex ===
His 2002 novel, Middlesex, won the 2003 Pulitzer Prize for Fiction in addition to being a finalist for the National Book Critics Circle Award, the International Dublin Literary Award, and France's Prix Médicis. Following the life and self-discovery of Calliope Stephanides, or later, Cal, an intersex person raised a girl, but genetically male, Middlesex also broadly deals with the Greek American immigrant experience in the United States, the rise and fall of Detroit, and explores the experience of an intersex person in the United States.

=== The Marriage Plot ===
After a nine-year hiatus, Eugenides published his third novel, The Marriage Plot, in October 2011. The novel follows three young adults enmeshed in a love triangle, as they graduate from Brown University and establish themselves in the world. Eugenides is currently at work developing a television screenplay of the novel, which was a finalist of the National Book Critics Circle Award for fiction in 2011; a New York Times notable book for 2011; and one of the top books of the year according to lists made by Publishers Weekly, Kirkus Reviews, and The Telegraph.

=== Fresh Complaint and fourth novel ===
In 2017, Eugenides published Fresh Complaint, a collection of short stories written between 1988 and 2017. He described the work as "a very mixed bag of stories, quite different, not all arranged around a certain theme".

He has suggested that a fourth novel will be published at an unspecified future date: "I have an idea; I don't know if it's going to work. But it's going to be a larger canvas, many more characters than in [The Marriage Plot]. Again, I'm going to respond to a very small directive. It's going to be written, well, I'm not going to say—but I know how it's going to be written and what the structure's going to be, and it's going to be quite different than The Marriage Plot."

== Awards and honors ==
- 1986 Nicholl Fellowships in Screenwriting (Academy of Motion Picture Arts and Sciences)
- 1991 Aga Khan Prize for Fiction for "The Virgin Suicides" [short story] (The Paris Review)
- 1993 Whiting Award
- 1994 Guggenheim Fellowship
- 1994 & 1996 MacDowell Fellowship
- 1995 Harold D. Vursell Memorial Award (American Academy of Arts and Letters)
- 2000–2001 Berlin Prize Fellow (American Academy in Berlin)
- 2002 National Book Critics Circle Award finalist (for Middlesex)
- 2003 Pulitzer Prize for Fiction (for Middlesex)
- 2003 Welt-Literaturpreis
- 2004 International Dublin Literary Award shortlist (for Middlesex)
- 2011 Salon Book Award (for The Marriage Plot)
- 2011 New York Times 100 Notable Books of 2011 list (for The Marriage Plot)
- 2012 National Book Critics Circle Award finalist (for The Marriage Plot)
- 2013 International Dublin Literary Award longlist (for The Marriage Plot)
- 2013 Named a fellow of the American Academy of Arts and Sciences
- 2013 Fitzgerald Prize (for "The Marriage Plot")
- 2014 Awarded honorary Doctorate of Letters from Brown University
- 2018 Inducted into the American Academy of Arts and Letters

== Works ==
=== Novels ===
- The Virgin Suicides. Farrar, Straus and Giroux. 1993. ISBN 978-0446670258.
- Middlesex. Farrar, Straus and Giroux. 2002. ISBN 978-0374199692.
- The Marriage Plot. Farrar, Straus and Giroux. 2011. ISBN 978-0007441297.

=== Short story collections ===
- Fresh Complaint. Farrar, Straus and Giroux. 2017. ISBN 978-0374717384. Contains 10 short stories:
  - "Complainers" (2017)
  - "Air Mail" (1996)
  - "Baster" (First appeared in The New Yorker, 1996)
  - "Early Music" (First appeared in The New Yorker, 2005)
  - "Timeshare"
  - "Find the Bad Guy" (First appeared in The New Yorker, 2013)
  - "The Oracular Vulva" (1999)
  - "Capricious Gardens" (First appeared in The Gettysburg Review, 1988)
  - "Great Experiment" (First appeared in The New Yorker, 2008)
  - "Fresh Complaint" (2017)

=== Short stories ===
Uncollected short stories.

- "The Speed of Sperm". Granta (54). Summer 1996.
- "A Genetic History of My Grandparents" (The New Yorker, 1997)
- "The Burning of Smyrna" (The New Yorker, 1998)
- "Ancient Myths" (The Spatial Uncanny, James Casebere, Sean Kelly Gallery, 2001)
- "The Obscure Object" (The New Yorker, 2002)
- "Extreme Solitude" (The New Yorker, 2010)
- "Asleep in the Lord" (The New Yorker, 2011)
- "Bronze" (The New Yorker, 2018)
