= Avernus (disambiguation) =

Avernus is a volcanic crater in Italy with significance for Roman mythology.

Avernus may also refer to:

- Lake Avernus, a lake in Italy
- Avernus Colles, a region on Mars
- Australian torpedo boat Avernus, a ship
- Avernus, a genus of spittlebugs in the family Aphrophoridae
- Avernus, a fictional location in the Outer Planes of the Dungeons & Dragons universe, which appeared in adventure modules like Baldur's Gate: Descent into Avernus, or video games such as Neverwinter or Baldur's Gate III
- Avernus, a fictional location in the 1998 Shogo: Mobile Armor Division video game
- Avernus, a fictional spaceship in the Helliconia series of science fiction novels

== See also ==
- Averno (disambiguation)
- Avernum
