= Averno =

Averno may refer to:

- Lake Avernus (Lago d'Averno), a crater lake in south Italy
- Avernus, entrance to the Roman underworld
- Averno (poetry collection), a book of poetry by Louise Glück
- Averno (wrestler), Mexican professional wrestler
- Averno (universe), multimedia universe/franchise created by Morgan Smith

== See also ==
- Avernus (disambiguation)
