= Elysium Planitia =

Broad plain that straddles the equator of Mars

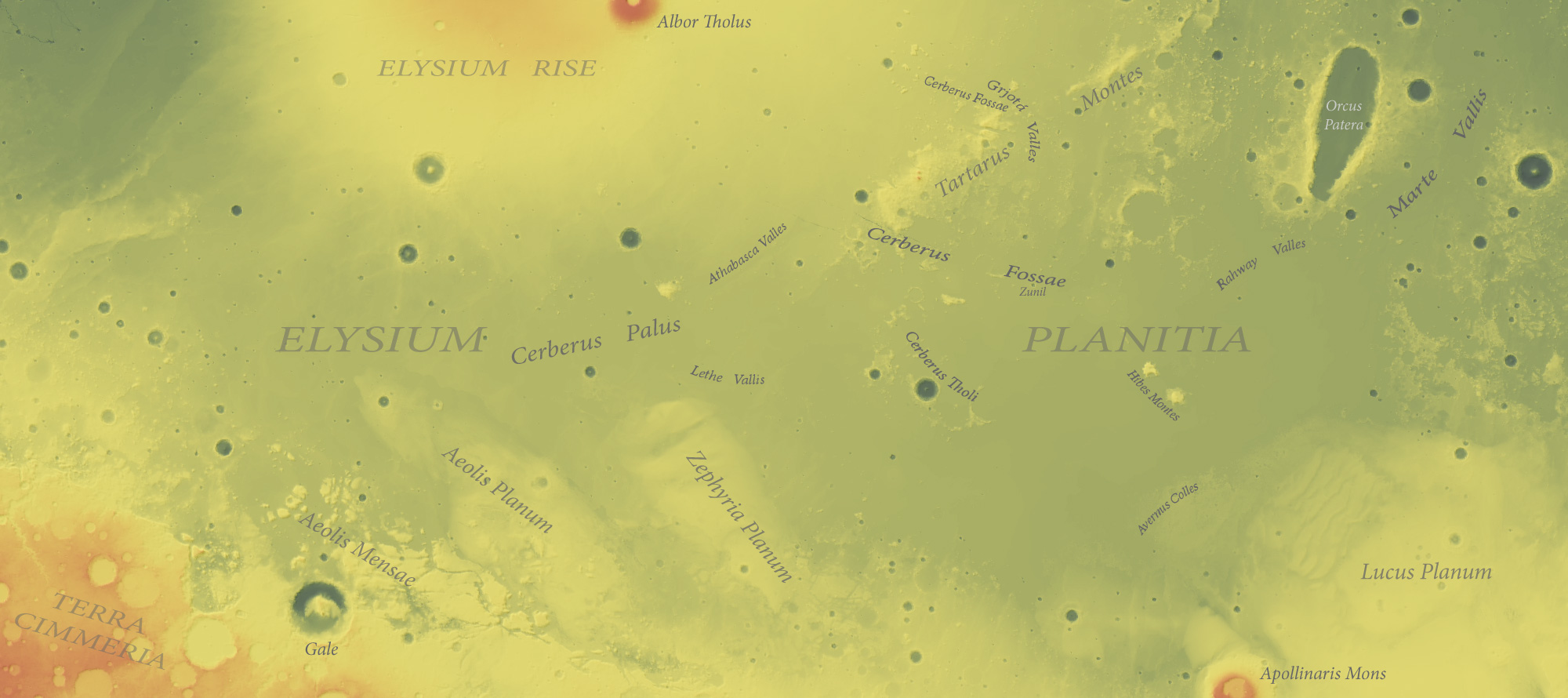
- MOLA topographical map of Elysium Planitia (spacecraft landing sites are annotated in Commons)
- Coordinates: 3.0°N 154.7°E

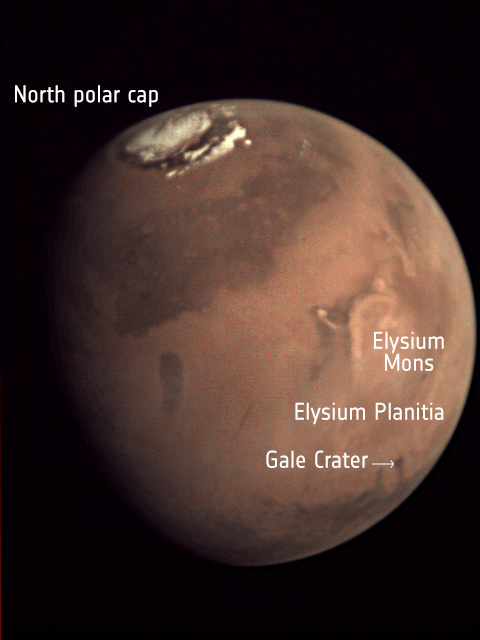
Location of Elysium Plantia on Mars

Elysium Planitia, located in the Elysium and Aeolis quadrangles, is a broad plain that straddles the equator of Mars, centered at 3.0°N 154.7°E. It lies to the south of the volcanic province of Elysium, the second largest volcanic region on the planet, after Tharsis. Elysium contains the major volcanoes Elysium Mons, Albor Tholus and Hecates Tholus. Another more ancient shield volcano, Apollinaris Mons, is situated just to the south of eastern Elysium Planitia. Within the plains, Cerberus Fossae is the only Mars location with recent volcanic eruptions. Lava flows dated no older than 0.2 million years from the present have been found, and evidence has been found that volcanic activity may have occurred as recently as 53,000 years ago. Such activity could have provided the environment, in terms of energy and chemicals, needed to support life forms.

The largest craters in Elysium Planitia are Eddie, Lockyer, and Tombaugh. The planitia also has river valleys—one of which, Athabasca Valles may be one of the youngest on Mars. On the north east side is an elongated depression called Orcus Patera, and this and some of the eastern plains were imaged in the 1965 Mariner 4 flyby.

A 2005 photo of a locale in Elysium Planitia at 5°N, 150°E by the Mars Express spacecraft shows what may be ash-covered water ice. The volume of ice is estimated to be 800 km (500 mi) by 900 km (560 mi) in size and 45 m (148 ft) deep, similar in size and depth to the North Sea. The ice is thought to be the remains of water floods from the Cerberus Fossae fissures about 2 to 10 million years ago. The surface of the area is broken into 'plates' like broken ice floating on a lake (see below). Impact crater counts show that the plates are up to 1 million years older than the gap material, showing that the area solidified much too slowly for the material to be basaltic lava.

== Overview ==
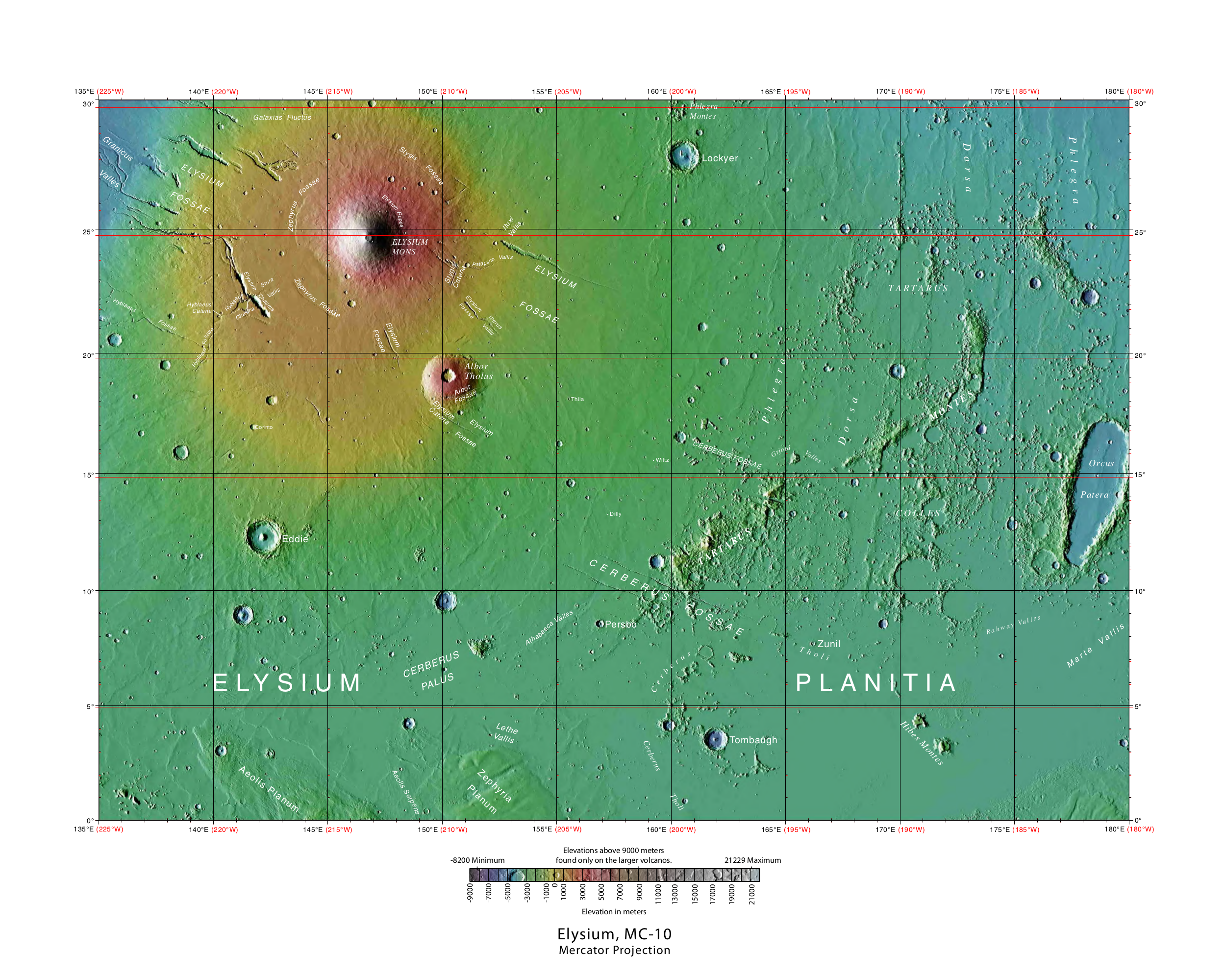
Elysium quadrangle MOLA map, with Elysium Planitia at bottom

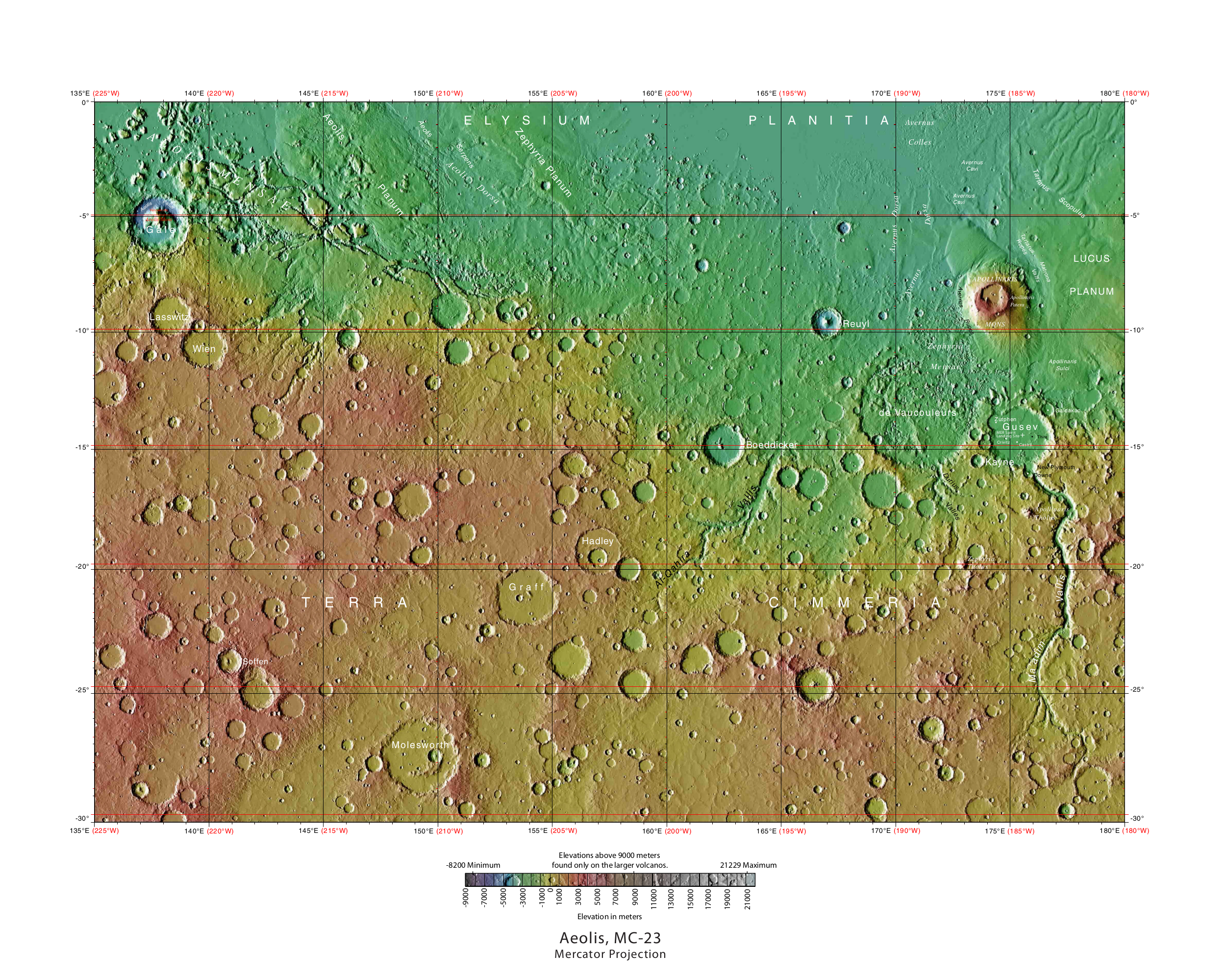
Aeolis quadrangle MOLA map, with Elysium Planitia at top

== Exploration ==
NASA's InSight mission landed in Elysium Planitia on 26 November 2018. It took off from Earth on 5 May 2018. The probe will study the internal structure of Mars and by so doing improve understanding of the planet's evolution. InSight Mars lander was able to take color pictures from the surface Elysium Planitia and sent them by radio signal back to Earth. During the descent sequence two additional items were jettisoned, the backshell with parachute, and heat shield, and they impacted in the vicinity of the lander.

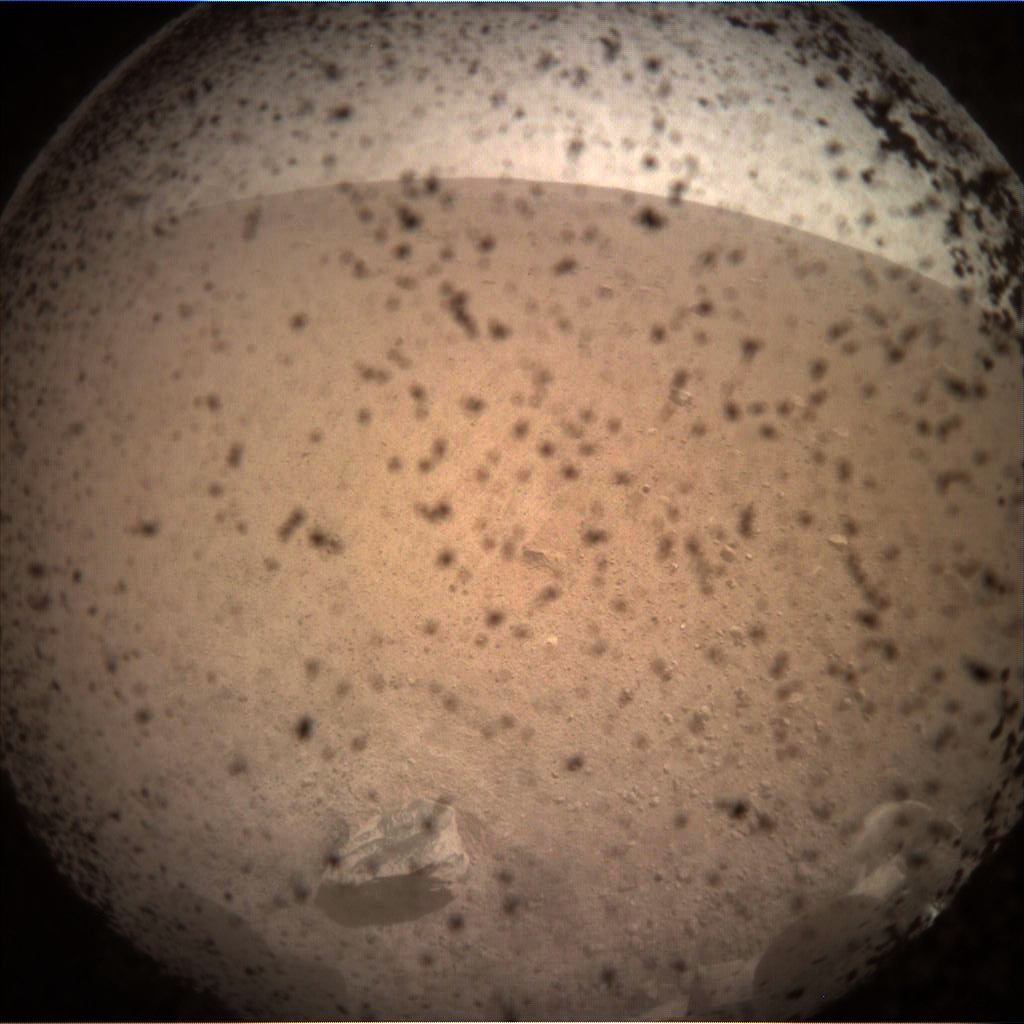
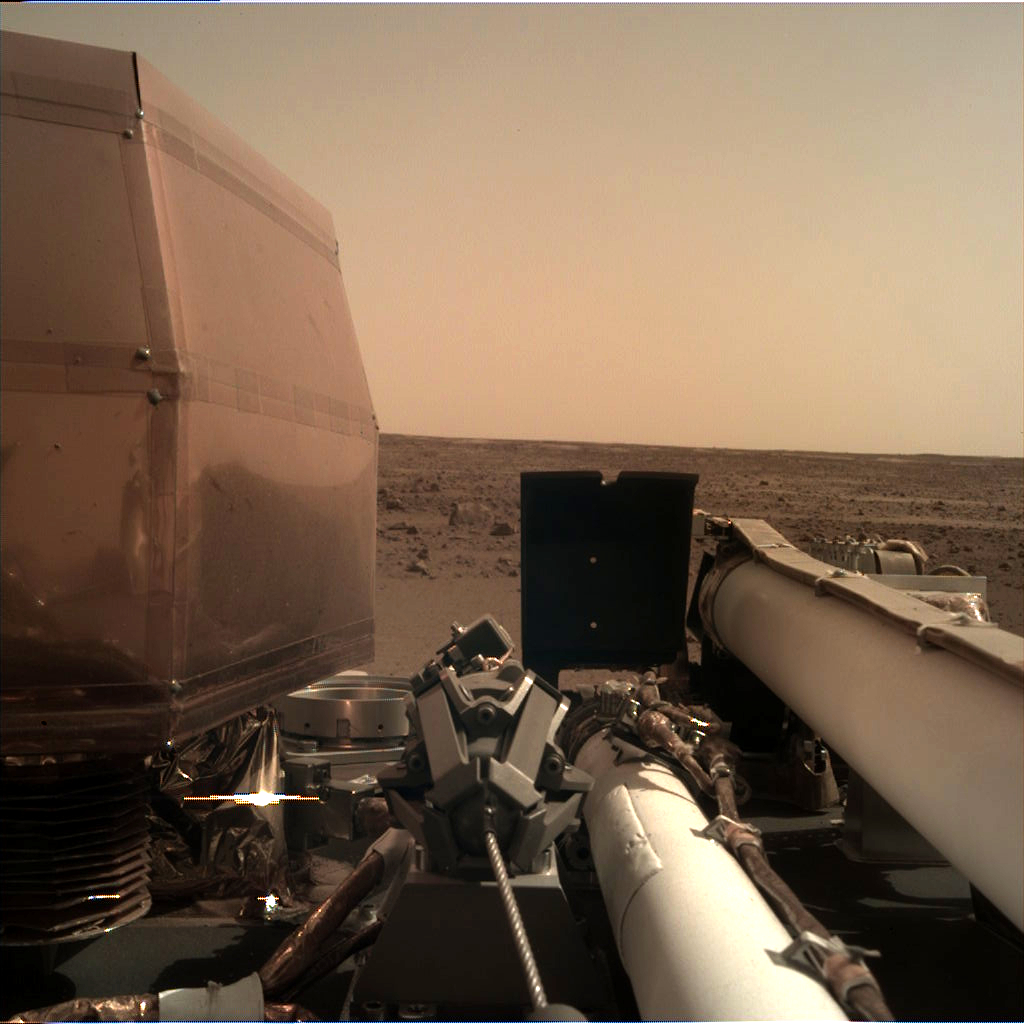
First images of Elysium Planitia from InSight's Instrument Context Camera (ICC, left), without lens cover and stretched (ICC, Middle), and the Instrument Deployment Camera (IDC, right)

In March 2017, scientists from the Jet Propulsion Laboratory announced that the landing site had been selected. It is located in western Elysium Planitia at 4.5°N 135.9°E. The landing site is about 600 km (370 mi) north from where the Curiosity rover is operating in Gale Crater.

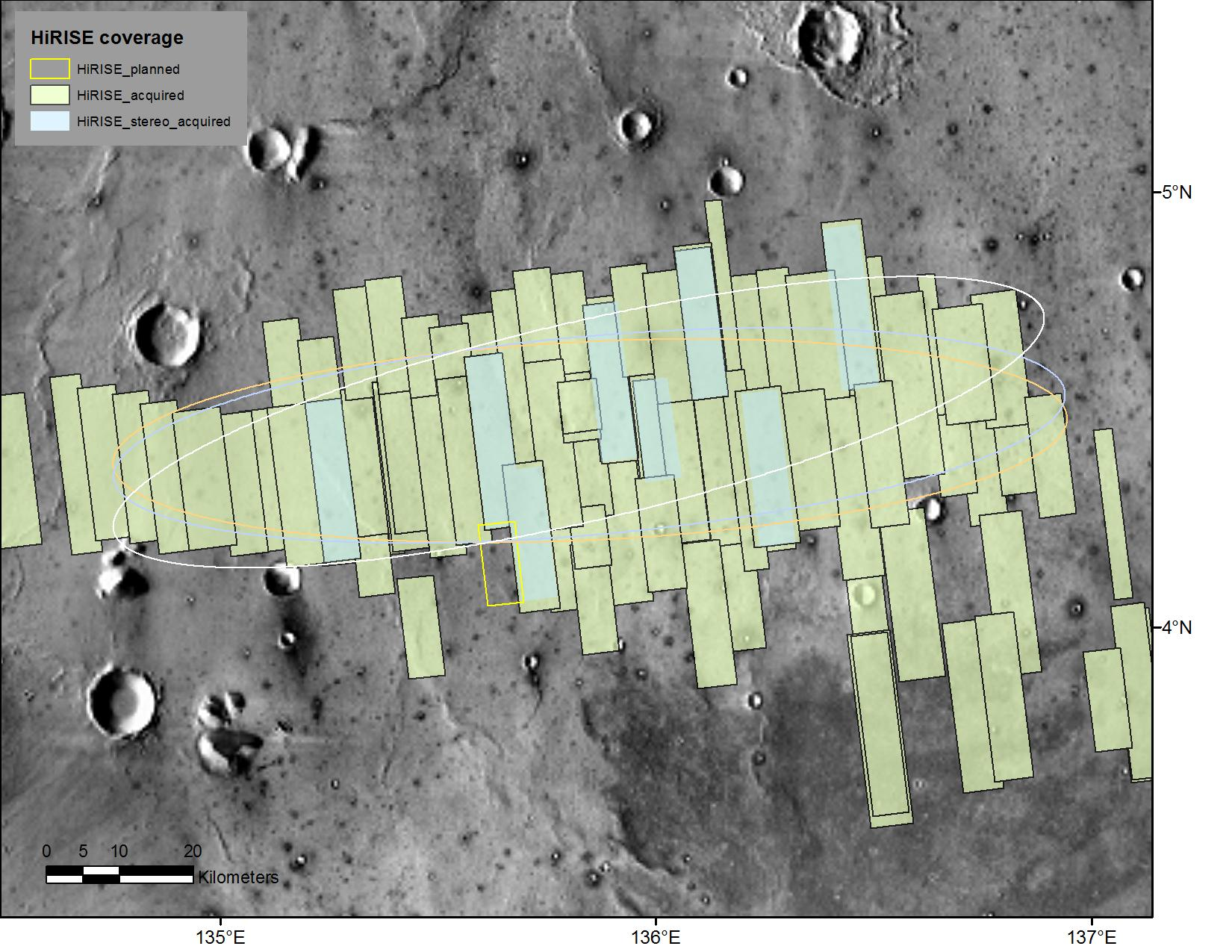
Image footprints by HiRise on Mars Reconnaissance Orbiter for studying the planned Insight landing ellipse. From east to west the scale is about 160 km (100 mi).

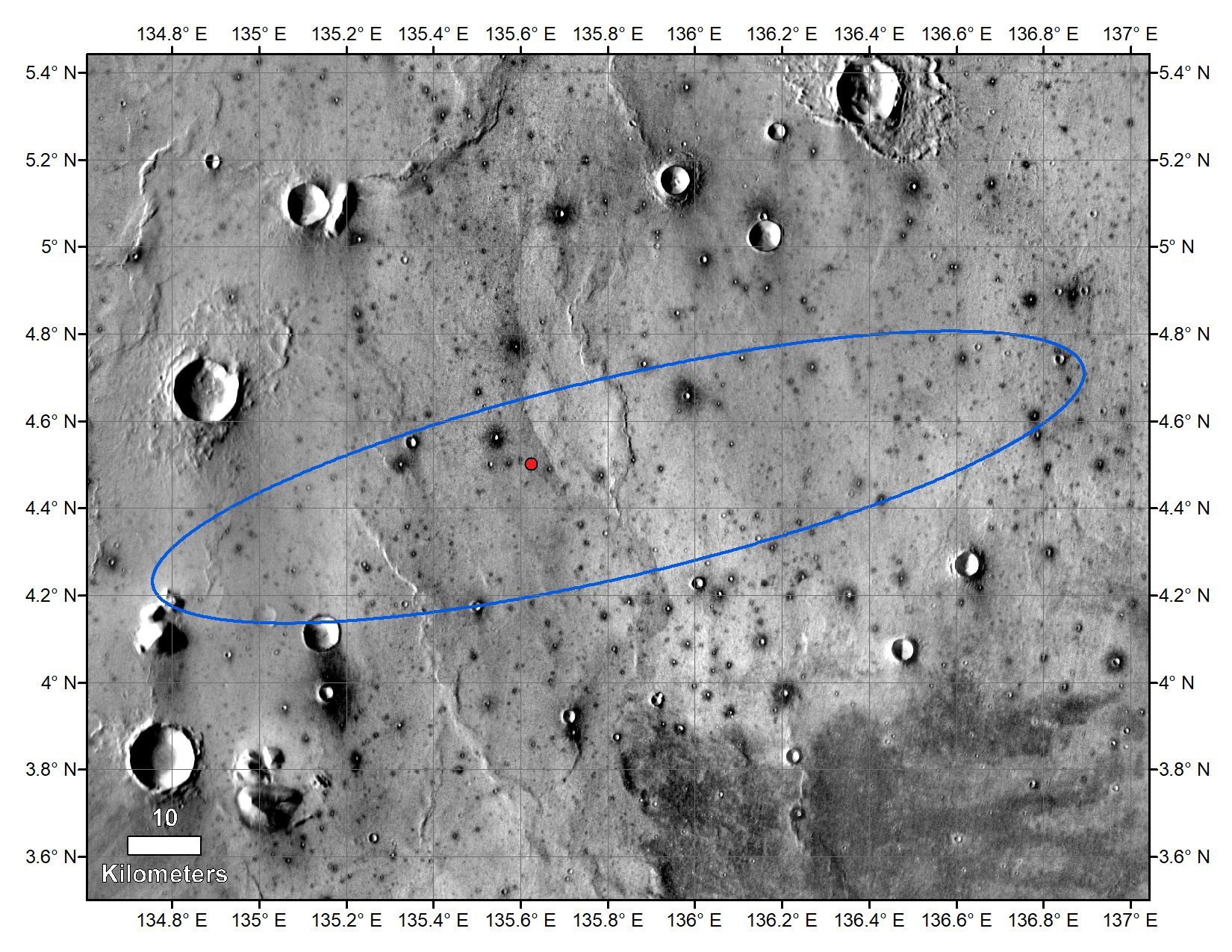
InSight final landing location (red dot)
(13 December 2018)

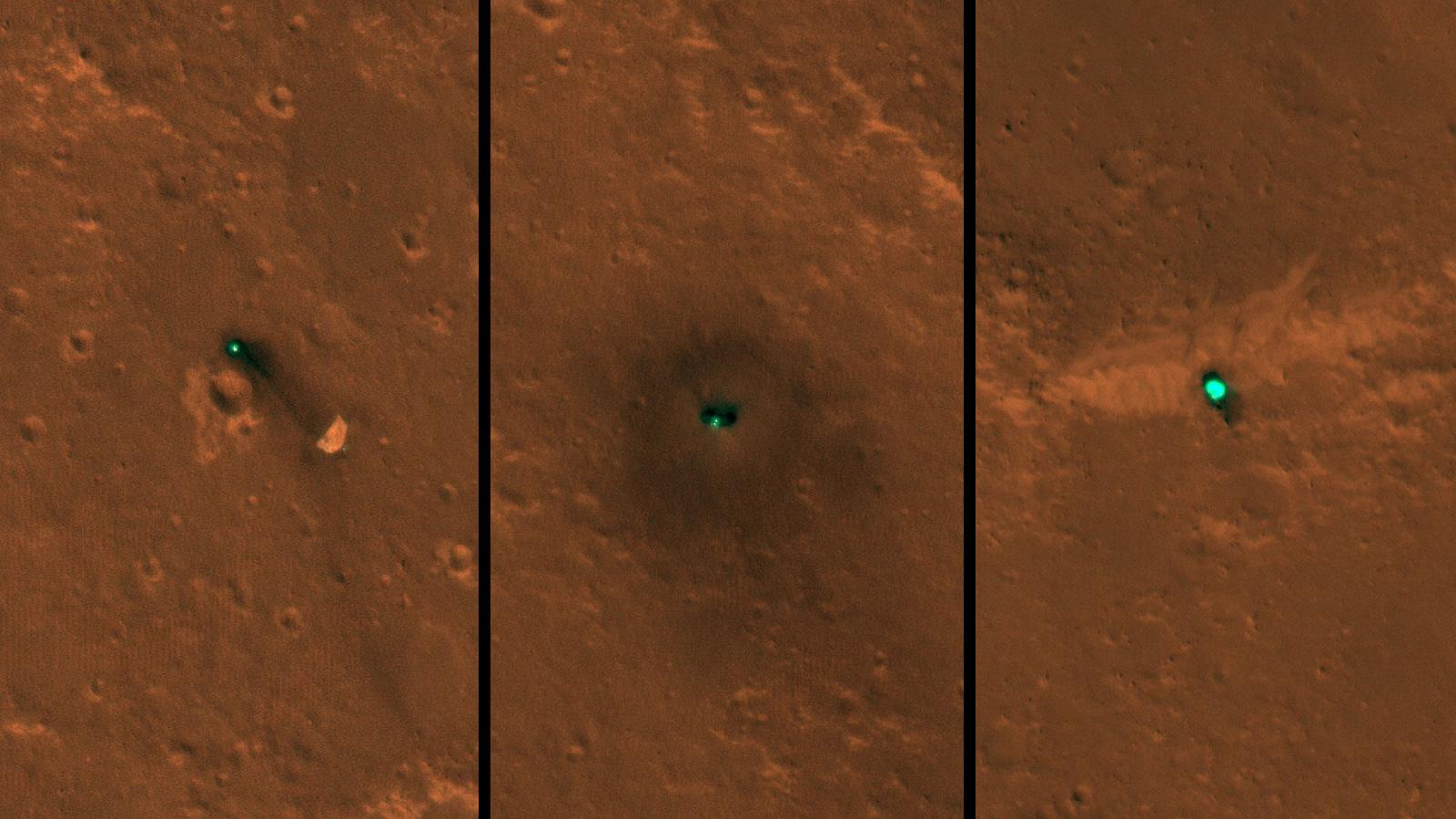
InSight backshell with parachute, lander, heat shield (11 December 2018)

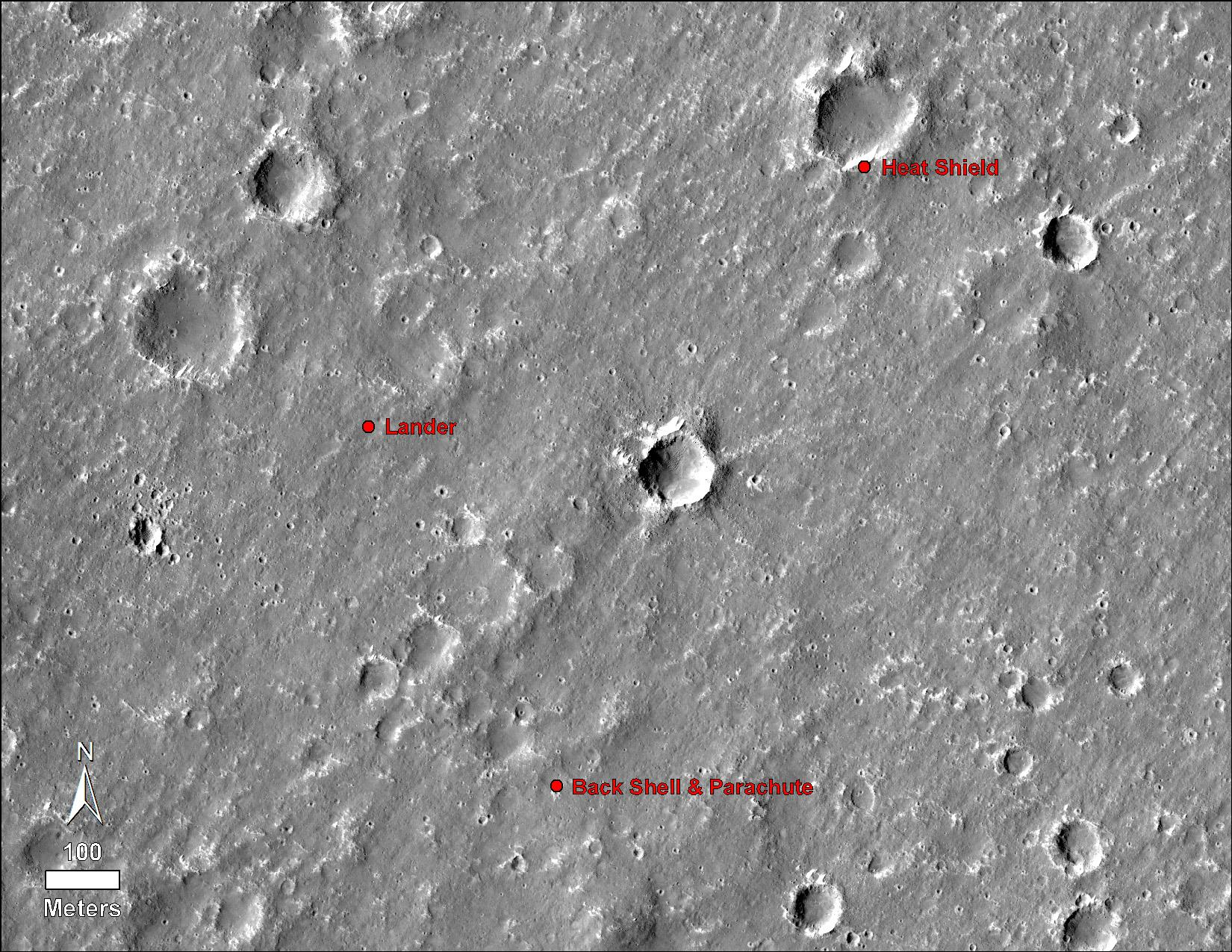
InSight backshell with parachute, lander, heat shield
(26 November 2018)

== Landforms ==
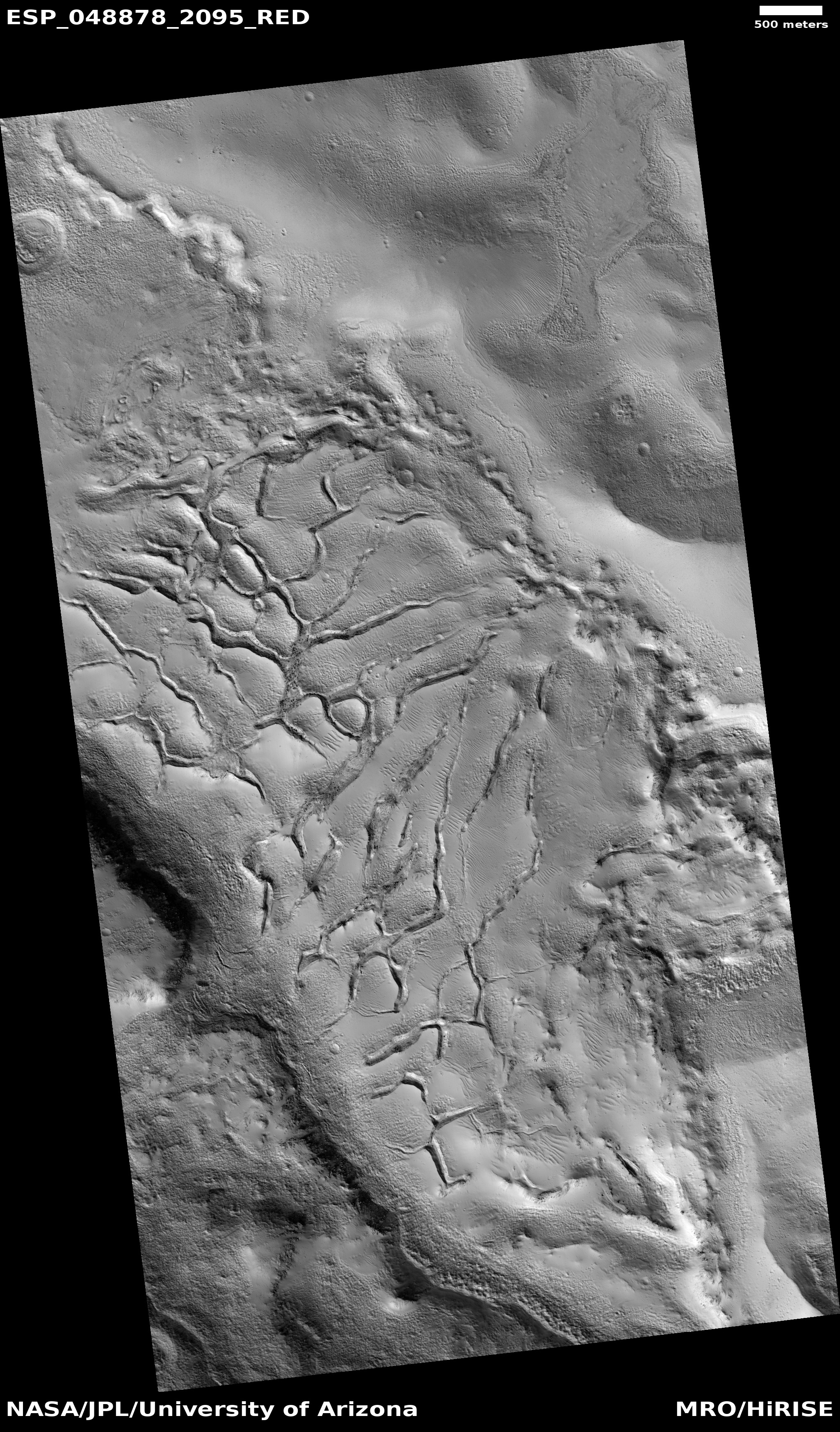
Wide view of fractured ground, as seen by HiRISE under HiWish program

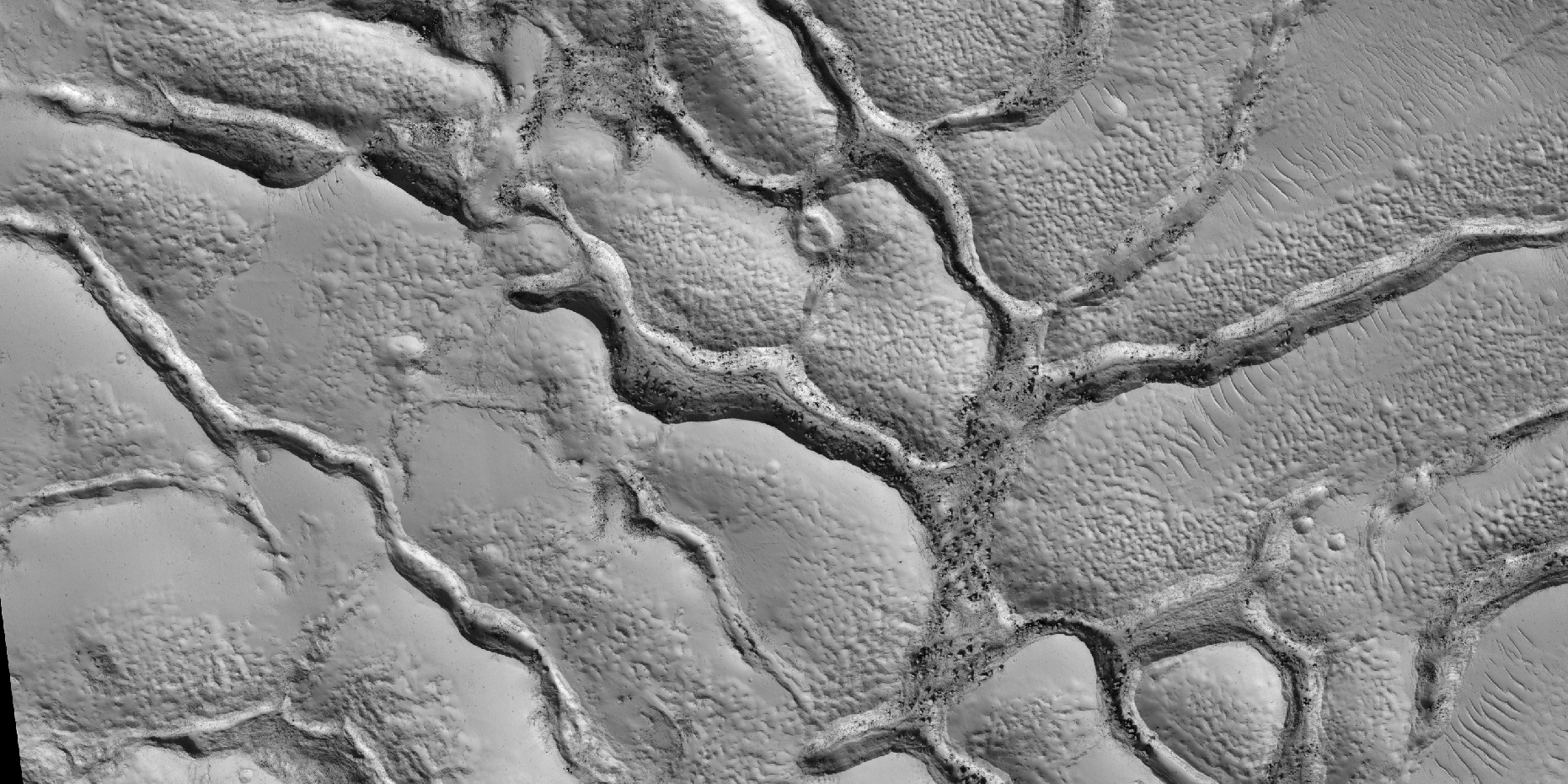
Close view of fractured ground, as seen by HiRISE under HiWish program

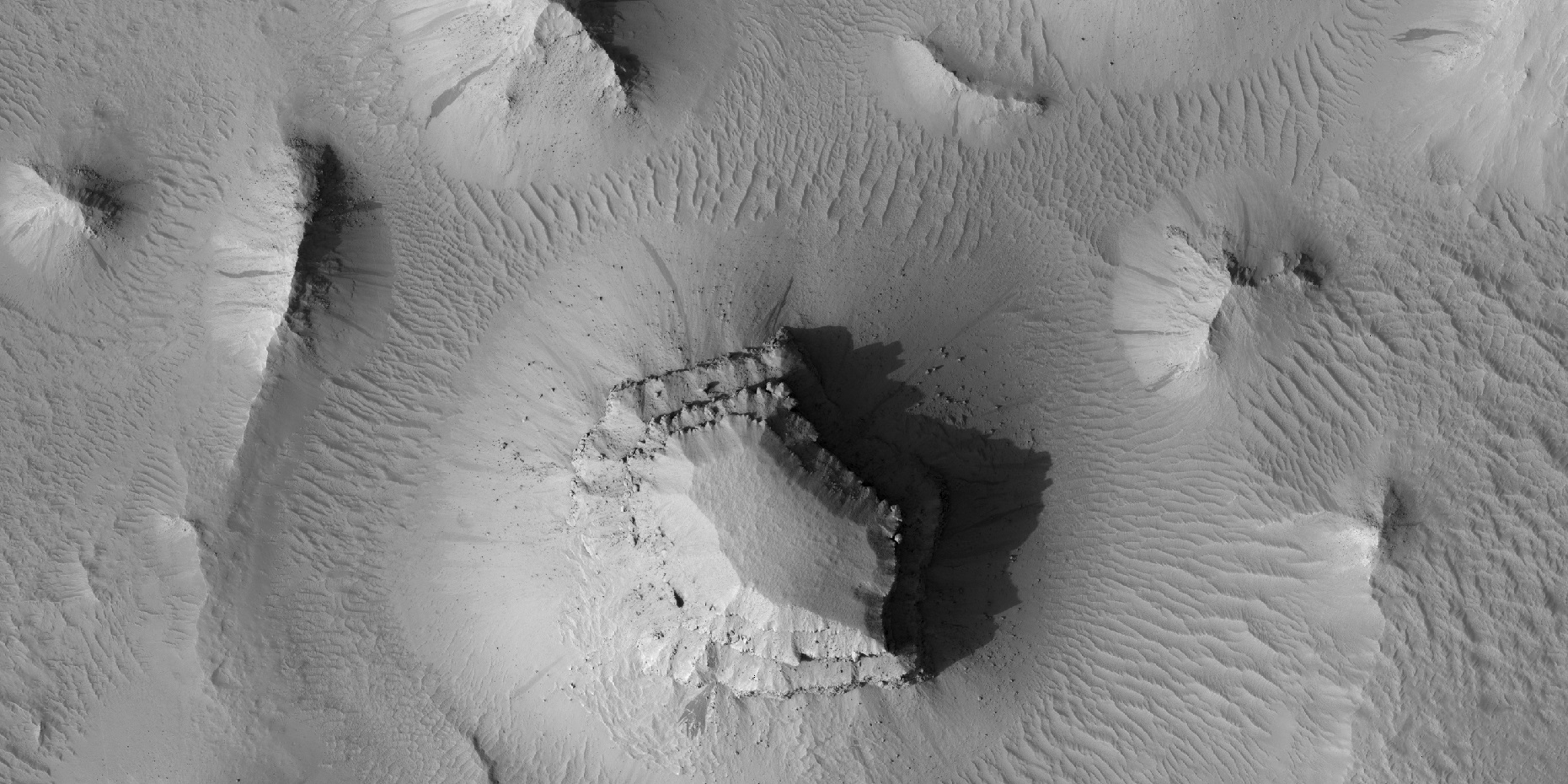
Layered mesa and mounds with dark slope streaks, as seen by HiRISE under HiWish program

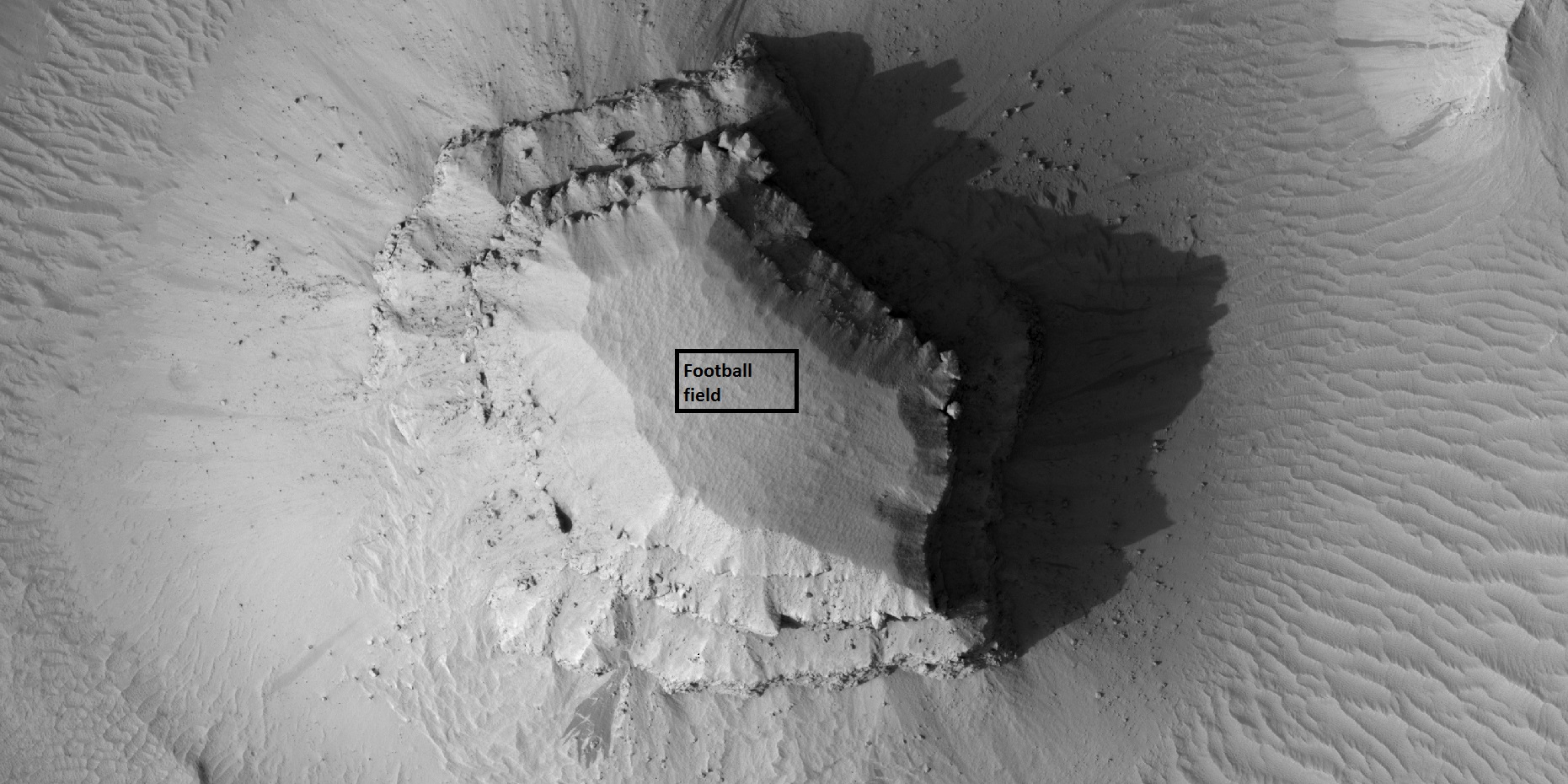
Close view of layered small mesa with dark slope streak, as seen by HiRISE under HiWish program. Box shows the size of a football field.

== Cones ==
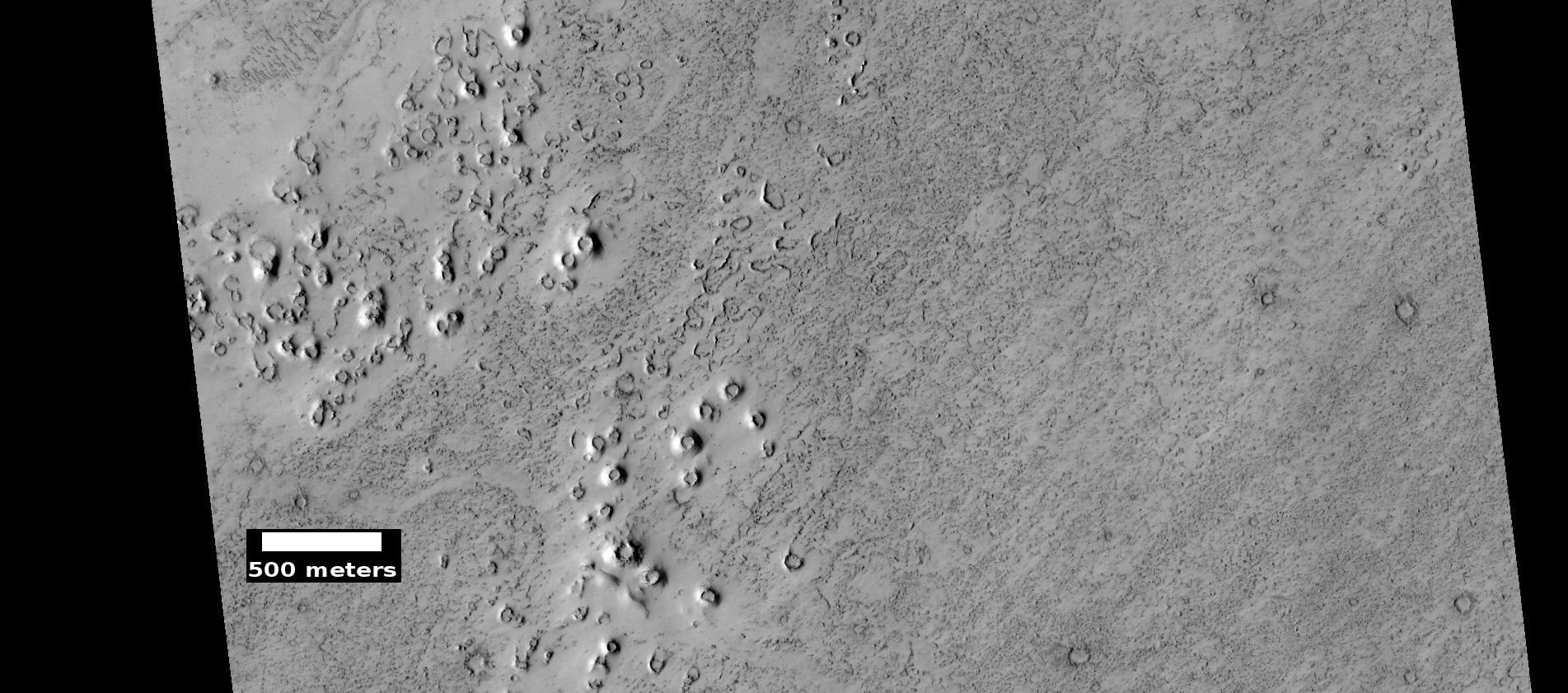
Cones, as seen by HiRISE under HiWish program. These cones probably formed when hot lava flowed over ice-rich ground.

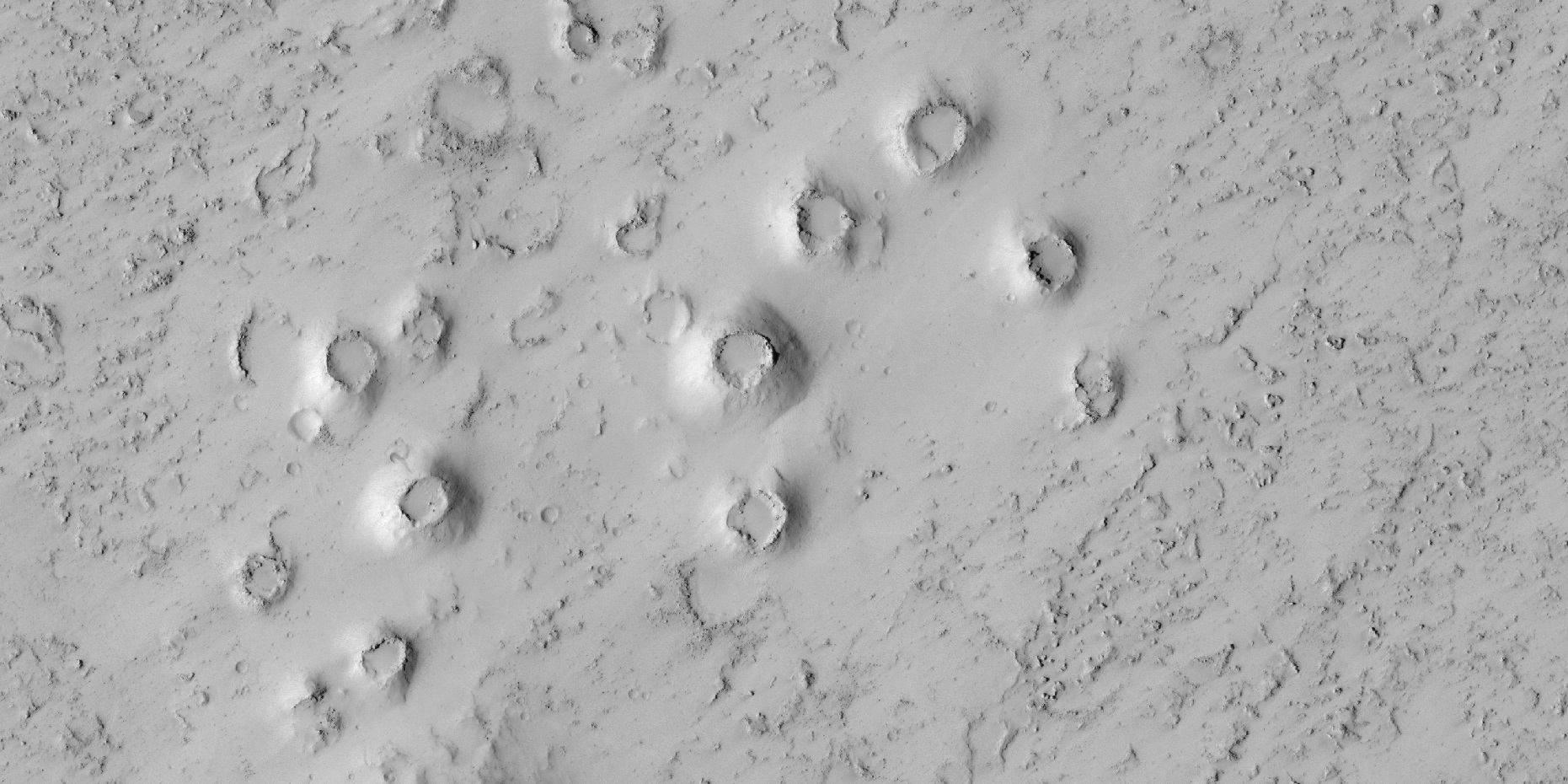
Close view of cones, as seen by HiRISE under HiWish program. These cones probably formed when hot lava flowed over ice-rich ground.

== Gallery ==
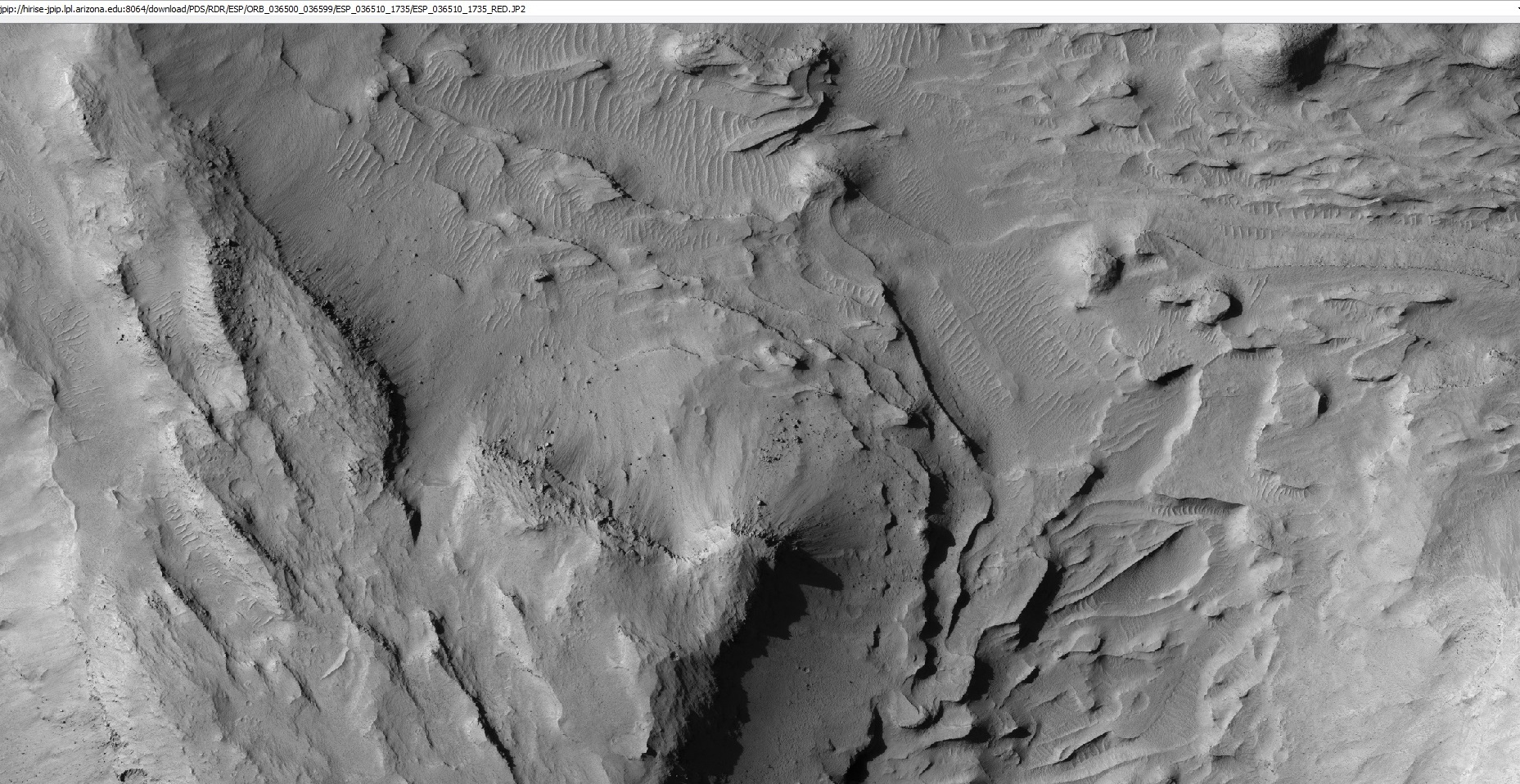
Mound showing layers at the base, as seen by HiRISE under HiWish program. Location is east of Gale Crater in the Aeolis quadrangle.

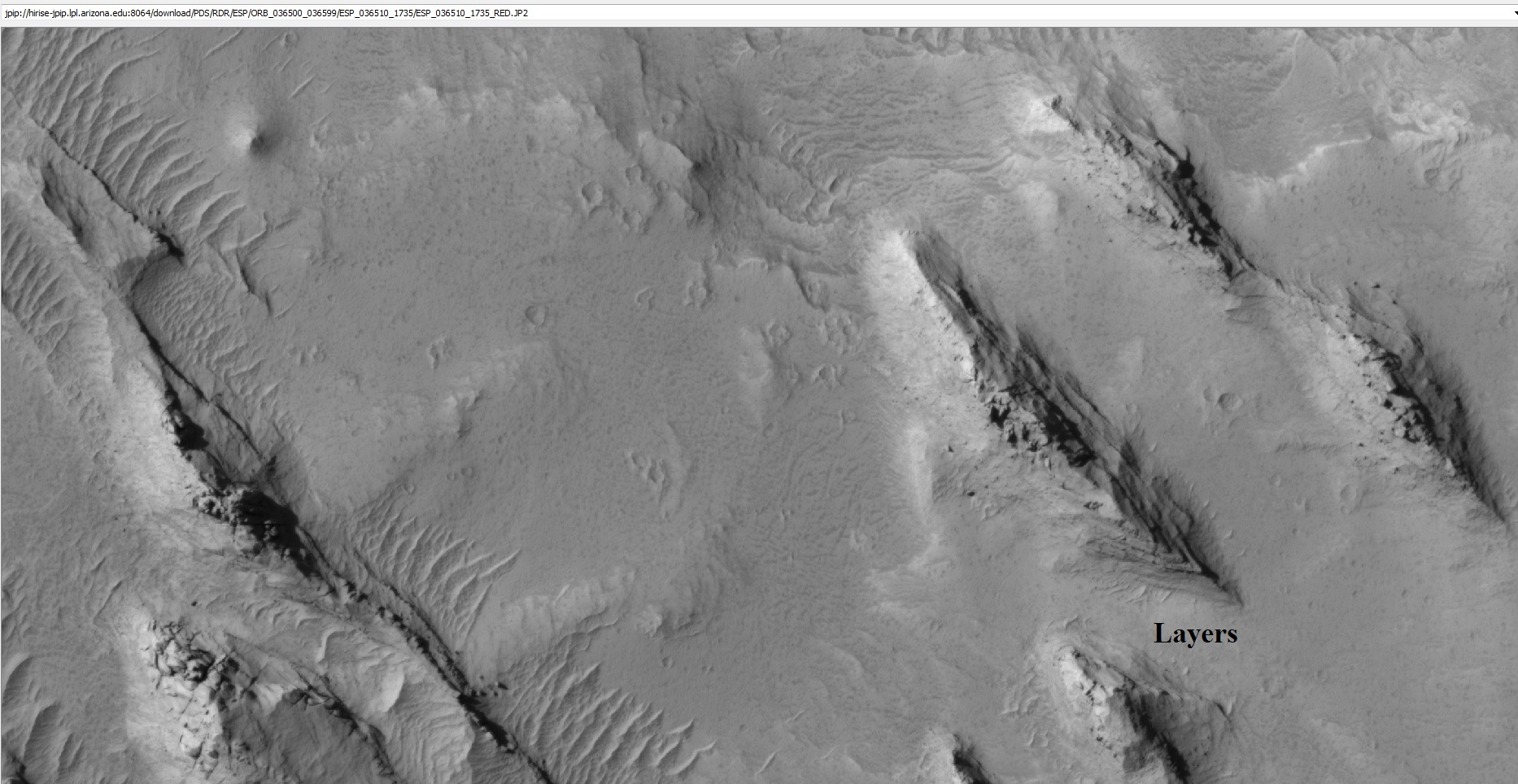
Yardangs showing layers, as seen by HiRISE under HiWish program. Location is east of Gale Crater in the Aeolis quadrangle.

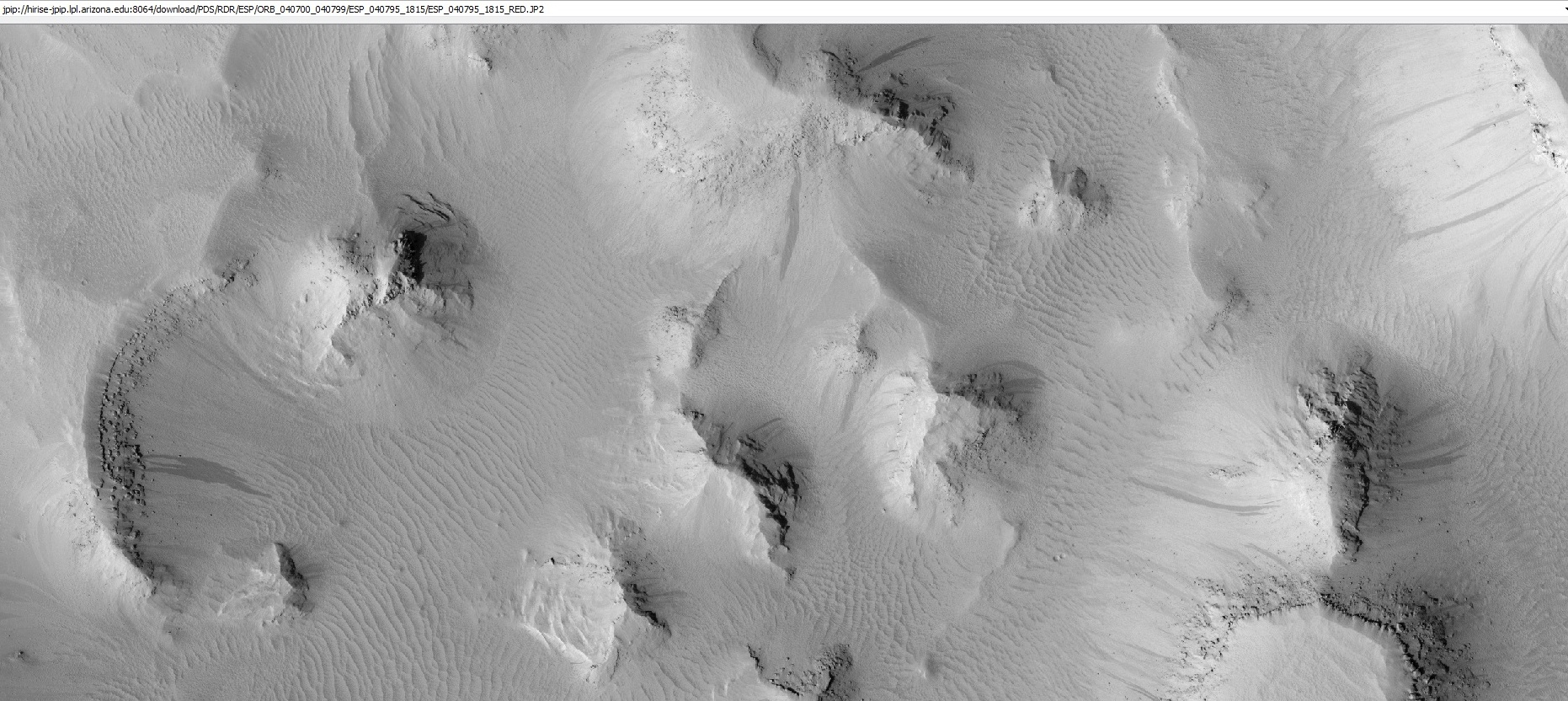
Mesas and eroded parts of mesas showing layers and dark slope streaks, as seen by HiRISE under HiWish program. Image is located in eastern Avernus Colles.

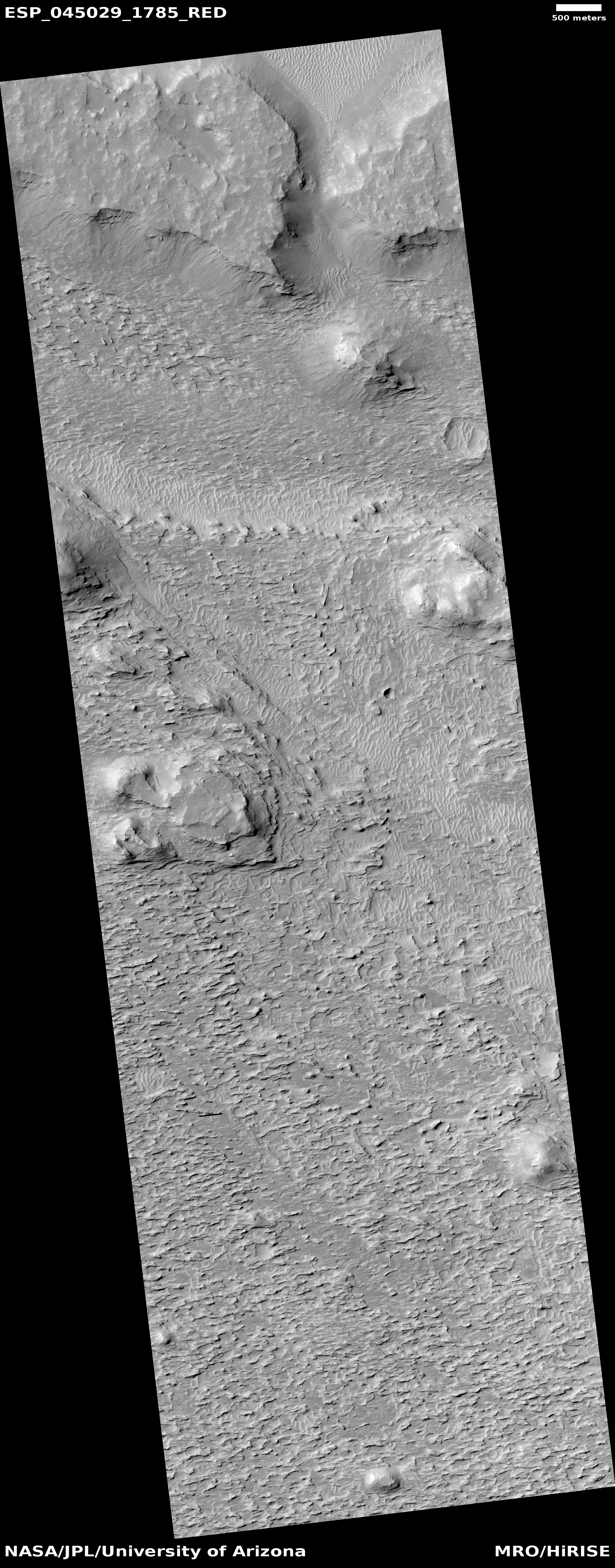
Wide view of layered terrain, as seen by HiRISE under HiWish program. Location is northeast of Gale Crater.

== See also ==
- Fossa (geology)
- Geography of Mars
- Geology of Mars
- List of plains on Mars
- List of quadrangles on Mars
