= Avernus Colles =

Colles on Mars

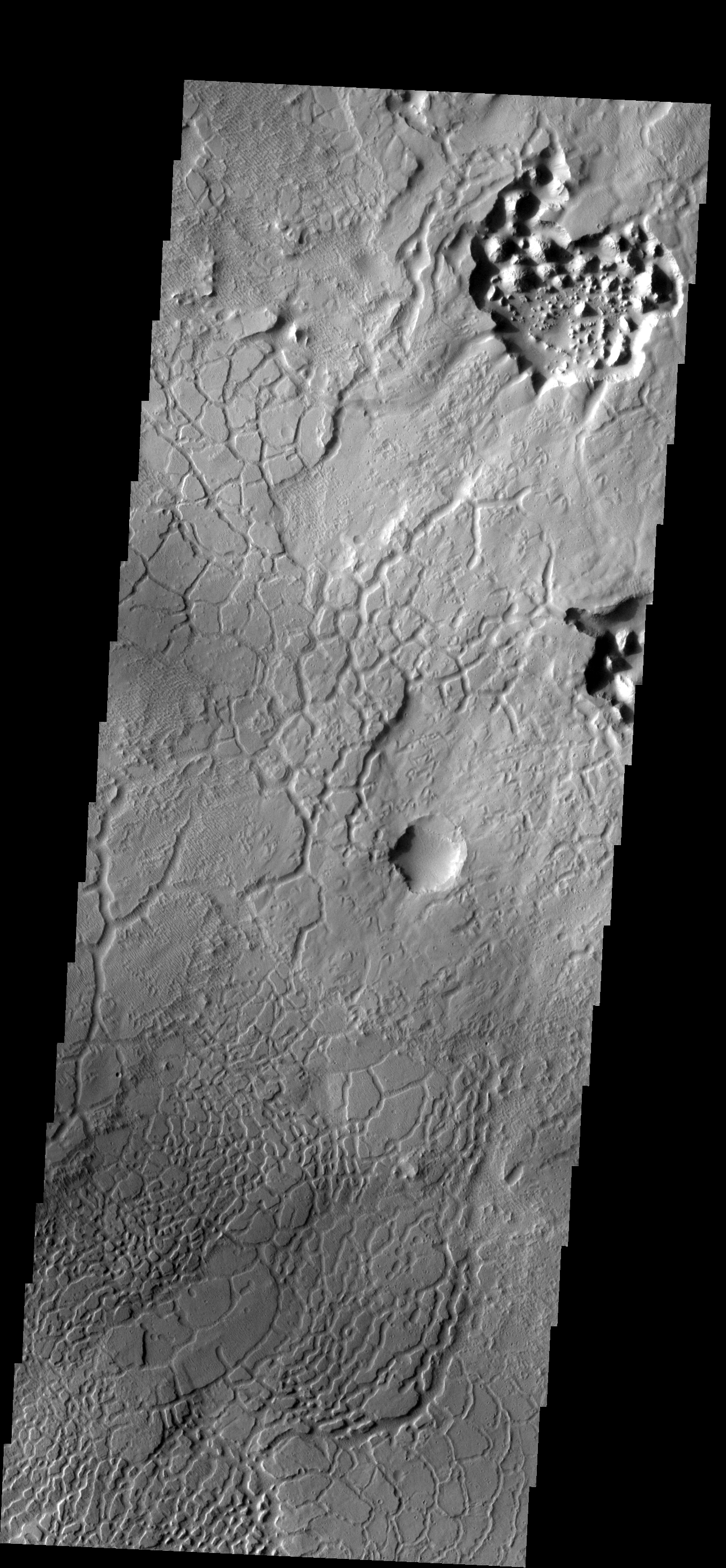
- Fractured terrain in Avernus Colles

Avernus Colles is a region of fractured terrain on Mars on the southeast margin of Elysium Planitia, at 1.6°S, 171°E. It is fairly large, being 244 km (152 mi) in diameter. Avernus Colles can be found in the Elysium quadrangle. It was named in 1985 after a lake in Campania, Italy, which is believed by some to be an entrance to the underworld.

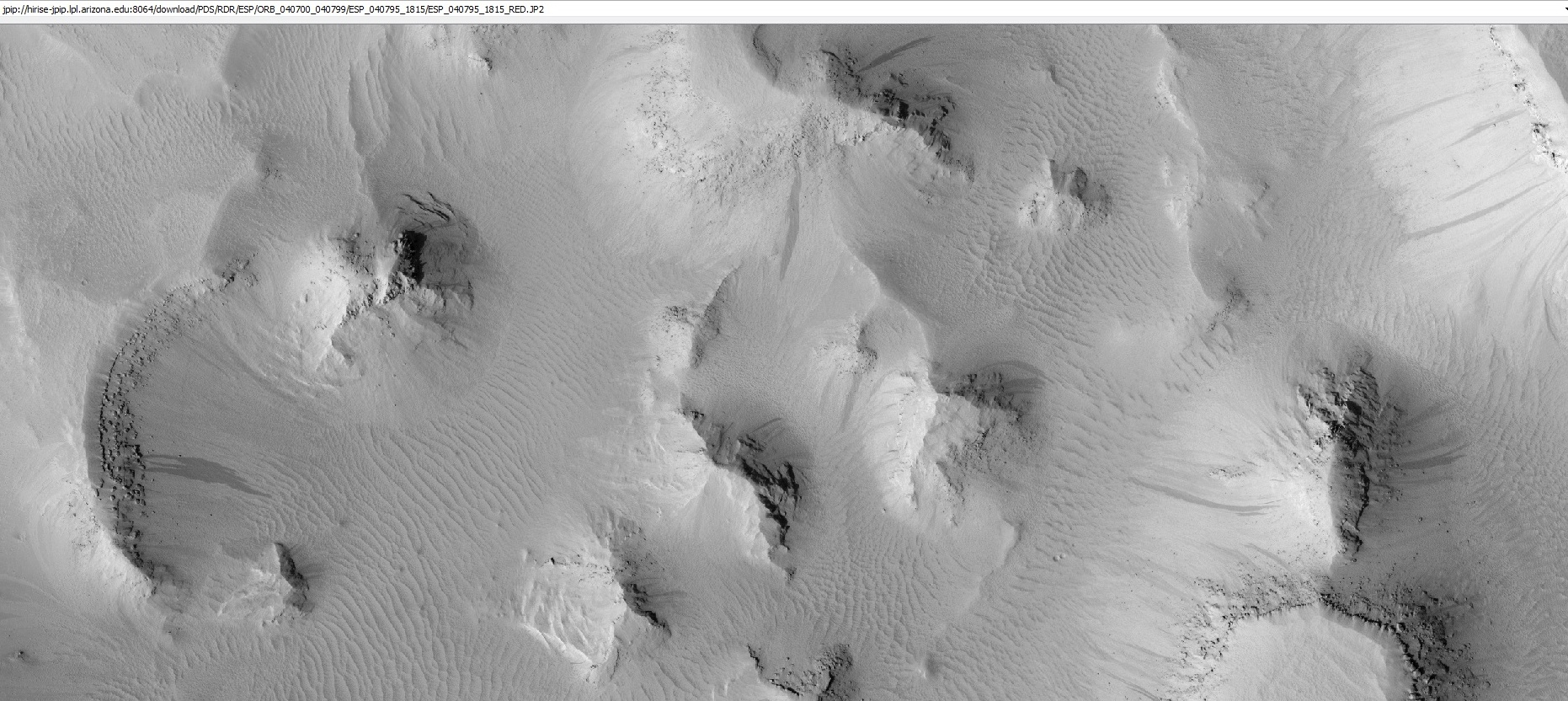
Mesas and eroded parts of mesas showing layers and dark slope streaks, as seen by HiRISE under HiWish program Image is located in eastern Avernus Colles.
