= Averno (universe) =

Transmedia franchise

- Created by: Morgan Smith
- Years: 2019–2021

Print publications
- Graphic novel: Dreamweaver (2019)

Films and television
- Short film: Into Averno (2020)
- Web series: Under Averno (2020)

Theatrical presentations
- Musicals: Willow (2020), Dazed (2021), Over and Out (2021), Bittersummer (2021)

Audio
- Radio program: Live from Averno (2019–2020)
- Original music: Welcome to Camp Averno (2020), Come Home EP (2020), Departments EP (2020)

Miscellaneous
- Epic poem(s): Arcana
- Alternate reality game(s): Find Averno ARG

Averno was a transmedia franchise and cult, run by Morgan Smith from 2019 to 2021. The franchise spanned across multiple mediums, and was focused primarily on the fictional small town of Averno, Virginia. The Averno universe was created in 2019 by then-20-year-old Morgan Smith, and became fully established in 2020. The planning/development/concept art team grew to more than 60 members all around the world by the end of its run.

The Averno universe encouraged fan content, although only concepts approved by the creator, Morgan Smith, were considered "canon". Maxwell "Sushi" Soucy, a former member of the concept team and composer of the musical Over and Out, described the universe as "witchy and magical."

Averno had a three-album partnership with the record label Broadway Records for the musicals Willow (released September 25, 2020), Over and Out (released January 15, 2021), and Bittersummer (released June 4, 2021).

Averno maintained a substantial online fandom, primarily consisting of teenagers searching for online connection during the COVID-19 pandemic. Fans congregated on Averno Discord servers, a hub for the alleged cult-like atmosphere.

On August 11, 2021, a document was released detailing allegations of professional misconduct, manipulation, and cultish behavior by Morgan Smith from several members of the creative team. Following these statements, Averno's social media presence almost entirely ceased, and has since largely been wiped.

== Creators ==
- Morgan Smith – Original creator of the Averno concept, a playwright who had previously helped create the off-Broadway musicals Oceanborn and Ogygia.
- Jamie Frazier – Concept designer and member of the "Live from Averno" podcast.
- August Riley "Auggie" Greenwood – Songwriter/playwright who had previously created the musical Antonia; they composed Willow, Dazed and Bittersummer, and would also go on to compose the musical Two Maiden Ladies with Nalah Palmer.
- Maxwell "Sushi" Soucy – Musician/composer/playwright; he would compose Over and Out and would also go on to create the musicals Rockabye and Lucifer's Law.
- Nalah Aiden Palmer – She would compose and perform violin solos for Averno, and go on to compose Two Maiden Ladies with August Greenwood.
- Raquel M. Varela – Co-writer of the graphic novel Dreamweaver.
- Clara Oswald-Larrosa – Director and actor in Into Averno and director for Dazed.
- Alex K. Masse – Sound designer for Dazed.
- Janeen Kyle – Musical director for Bittersummer.

== Worldbuilding ==
The universe centered around the fictional town of Averno and its surrounding areas. The project attempted to draw fans in with magical and nostalgic messaging, exemplified by the "Averno 101" section on its now-defunct website:

Do you get chills when you watch our videos?
Do you see things in your head when you listen to our music?
Do you feel like you've been to the places we show you, perhaps in a past life?
Does Averno feel like a memory from childhood, the kind that you’re not quite sure is real? The kind that of place that exists somewhere between memory and dream?
Do you get homesick when you think of A New School?
Can you see yourself sitting at the edge of the lake, watching prank wars between cabins at Camp Averno, walking home on dirt roads and looking up at the stars?
Have you always had Universe Dysphoria? Felt as though there must be something bigger out there, a different story that you belong in? Like you’ve been in a waiting room for your whole life, waiting for something to happen?
When you were a kid, did you ever look out the car window and watch the woods, imagining that something was running alongside you, just on the other side of the trees?
Do bees follow you?
Does it feel like the forest has woken up?
Is the natural language of thought inside your head story?
Averno has been calling you for your whole life.
You’re just now learning how to answer.

There were three sites within the Averno universe described in canon;

=== The Forest ===
According to official content, Averno was created when an Evangelical preacher burned down the cottage of Aster, a witch, killing her daughter. Aster's magical rage "ripped open the fabric between the worlds." This created Averno, a haven for women and queer individuals to find community.

=== A New School ===
A New School is the private school of Averno. The school has six departments and a "rumored" seventh:

- Department of Dead Languages (DDL)
- Department of Hidden Sequences (DHS)
- Department of Lost Histories (DLH)
- Department of Higher Powers (DHP)
- Department of Cults and Mysteries (DCM)
- Department of Creation and Destruction (DCD)
- Department of Unconfirmed Existence (DUE)

Fans could take a quiz to assign themselves a department, similar to Hogwarts houses.

=== Averno, the Town ===
The town of Averno is characterized as being from another time, located in the Forest's shadow. The website described: "Walking down the street, people stop and stare, and even in an empty room, you get the sense that you are not alone."

== Musicals ==
Averno released several concept albums of shows that were never produced.

=== Willow ===
The album of Willow was released by Broadway Records on September 25, 2020. It reached number 7 on the Billboard cast album chart. The book was written by Morgan Smith, and the music was written by August Greenwood. It stars Emma Freeman, Janeen Garcia, Rachael Chau, August Greenwood, and Madelyn Paterna. It also includes a bonus track sung by Christy Altomare, who originated the titular role in the Broadway premiere of Anastasia.

Willow contains three different storylines: Adelaide and Beatrice, Cassia and Grace, and Meg and her imaginary friend. They all take place in different years, but they're connected by the willow tree under which each pair meets.

=== Dazed ===
The album of Dazed was released on January 3, 2021 as a culmination to the Find Averno ARG. The book was written by Morgan Smith, and the music was written by Alicia Selkirk with lyrics by Morgan Smith, Alicia Selkirk, and August Greenwood. Concept design was by Morgan Smith and August Greenwood. Averno also released a full-length video of the musical available on YouTube. The video stars Jamie Frazier, Morgan Smith, Alicia Selkirk, Emma Freeman, and Clara Oswald-Larrosa.

In the musical, Will and Quinn from the podcast Live from Averno are investigating the mysterious disappearance of Hugo Selva. But Kennedy Harris, a college student at A New School, finds Hugo's journal first. They convince their best friend to accompany them as they try to find Unverno.

=== Over and Out ===
The album of Over and Out was released by Broadway Records on January 15, 2021. It reached number 11 on the Billboard cast album chart. The book was written by Morgan Smith, and the music was written by Sushi Soucy. It stars Sushi Soucy and Janeen Garcia, with additional vocals by Nalah Palmer, Morgan Smith, and August Greenwood. The album also includes a bonus track sung by Mariah Rose Faith, known for the US National Tour of Mean Girls and the online musical Starry.

Over and Out follows Solar and Nova, two freshmen at A New School (the small liberal arts college located just outside Averno). Solar, the main character, scans through channels on their walkie-talkie, trying to find an alien. Instead, they meet a girl, Nova.

=== Bittersummer ===
Bittersummer was released by Broadway Records on June 4, 2021. It includes music by Annalise Emerick and the Brother Brothers and a book written by Morgan Smith. The cast includes Janeen Garcia, Jasmine Aurora Thomas, Rachael Chau, Richard Eyler, and Emma Freeman. "It is, at its core, a story about growing up queer in the South," said Smith.

== Other media ==
=== Live from Averno ===
Live from Averno is a true crime-style podcast hosted by Quinn (Jamie Frazier) and Will (Morgan Smith), two college students at A New School. The first episode was released on October 27, 2019. The seventh and most recent episode was released on November 27, 2020.

=== Dreamweaver ===
Dreamweaver is a graphic novel by Raquel M. Varela and Morgan Smith. The first chapter was released in December 2019, and the rest is not available. It tells the story of Scarlett, a young girl who grew up in an abusive home and was rescued by the Shadowmothers to come live in the forest.

=== The Departments EP ===
The Departments EP is an album released on October 31, 2020 with instrumental songs based on the seven departments of A New School. It includes music by Fairything, ACONITE, and Thawney.

=== Arcana ===
Arcana is an epic poem written by Morgan Smith and based around the Major Arcana tarot cards. Four chapters were released as videos on the Averno Instagram.

=== Find Averno ARG ===
Find Averno was an alternate reality game (ARG) run by the Averno team in December 2020/January 2021, culminating in the release of the musical Dazed. The plot of the ARG was that a character named Kennedy, an Averno fan, went missing, and ARG participants were trying to find them. It seems they thought Averno was real and were trying to get there. As it turned out, they did make it to Averno, where they then became a character in Dazed. The game included themes around chess, physics, alternate dimensions, vines, water, herbs, Greek mythology, fairy tales, and losing oneself.

=== Into Averno ===
Into Averno is a short film written by Morgan Smith and directed by Cayden Larrosa, starring the two of them as ‘the girl’ and ‘the new kid,’ respectively. It was released on YouTube on December 19, 2020.

=== Under Averno ===
Under Averno is an online video series written by Sushi Soucy, and August Greenwood. Two episodes exist, the first released on October 31, 2020 and the second published on December 23, 2020. It follows Rori Svennson (August Greenwood) and Bo Brandywine (Sushi Soucy) as they explore the mysteries of Averno, believing the source of them is the existence and presence of ghosts.
