= List of Special A episodes =

The following is the list of episodes for the Japanese anime series Special A. The episodes are produced by AIC and GONZO, directed by Yoshikazu Miyao and composed by Jukki Hanada. Characters are adapted from the manga drawn by Maki Minami. It is currently airing in Japan on Chiba TV and various other stations. Broadcast on Chiba TV began on 6 April 2008 and continued for 24 episodes, ending on 14 September 2008.

The series has been given four different theme songs, two opening themes and two ending themes. All the theme songs were performed by the seven principal cast members: Yūko Gotō, Jun Fukuyama, Hitomi Nabatame, Hiro Shimono, Tsubasa Yonaga, Kazuma Horie, and Ayahi Takagaki.

The anime is licensed by Mighty Media Co., Ltd in China and Taiwan and Sentai Filmworks in America and Canada. Special A premiered in the Philippines on February 26, 2009, and ended on March 31, 2009, through TV5. The show premiered 5 months after it ended in Japan making it the fastest acquired anime title on Philippine free TV history. It is the first country in Southeast Asia to air the series outside Japan. This anime was aired in South Korea via Animax, marking it as the first country in East Asia and second in Asia to air the series outside Japan.

== Episodes ==
No.	Title	Original release date
1	"Hikari ~ Kei"; Transliteration: "Hikari·Kei" (Japanese: 光·彗)	6 April 2008
At six years old, Hikari Hanazono was unbeaten at pro-wrestling until she was easily defeated by Kei Takishima. Since that day, she has vowed to defeat Kei, who proves to be remarkably talented at whatever he attempts, and has convinced her father to allow her to attend the same expensive elite schools as her rival' Kei Takishima!
2	"Pride ~ Pro-Wrestling"; Transliteration: "Puraido·Puroresu" (Japanese: プライド·プロレス)	13 April 2008
The S.A is challenged to a pro-wrestling competition by the Student Council President, Hajime Kakei. Hikari and Kei accept the challenge, but run into trouble when the President decides to use underhanded tactics to beat them and Kei begins to worry about Hikari's safety without considering her feelings.
3	"Rice Balls ~ Sincerity"; Transliteration: "Onigiri･Magokoro" (Japanese: おにぎり･まごころ)	20 April 2008
Hikari, having lost a bet to Kei in the previous episode, agrees to make a bento for him. However, despite how hard she tries, all Hikari's attempts to cook something wonderful for him to eat prove to be disastrous.
4	"Brothers ~ Teacher"; Transliteration: "Kyōdai･Sensei" (Japanese: 兄弟･先生)	27 April 2008
Kei invites Hikari to his house because his father wants to talk about pro-wrestling with someone. She unexpectedly becomes a tutor to Kei's younger brother, Sui, who has a rather strained relationship with Kei, and tries to bring the brothers closer together.
5	"Festival ~ Contest"; Transliteration: "Matsuri･Shōbu" (Japanese: 祭り･勝負)	4 May 2008
The Student Council and S.A challenge each other to see who will organize the upcoming school festival, but Hikari and Kei end up arguing; Hikari joins the Student Council's side and Akira soon follows. While Kei takes them all on single-handedly, Hikari learns that he has always done everything alone.
6	"Invitation ~ Saiga's Mansion"; Transliteration: "Shōtaijō·Saiga Yakushi" (Japanese: 招待状･雑賀邸)	11 May 2008
Because of some intervention from Sui, Hikari ends up being Kei's partner at a birthday party for Yahiro Saiga. While wondering how Yahiro fits into Kei's past, Hikari is shocked to hear from Yahiro that Kei is in love with her.
7	"Sensitive ~ Thickheaded"; Transliteration: "Binkan·Donkan" (Japanese: 敏感·鈍感)	18 May 2008
Unable to believe that Kei is in love with her, Hikari behaves strangely around Kei after Yahiro's party and refuses to tell him why. To determine where the S.A will go for their vacation, Kei suggests a contest where the winner decides - with the condition that if he wins, Hikari will tell him what Yahiro said to her at the party.
8	"Journey ~ Dog"; Transliteration: "Tabi·Inu" (Japanese: 旅·犬)	25 May 2008
The S.A head off to Hawaii for their summer vacation, but end up playing "family" to Chitose, the spoiled and demanding son of a client for Ryuu's family. He is particularly harsh with Hikari, but she is determined to make sure he has a good time, even if it means being the dog in Chitose's family.
9	"Villa ~ Letter"; Transliteration: "Bessō·Tegami" (Japanese: 別荘·手紙)	1 June 2008
Hikari joins Yahiro and Chitose at their villa in order to find out why Yahiro's relationship with Kei and Akira is so strained, but ends up becoming his prisoner so that Yahiro can force Akira to see him again. At that moment Kei was worried of Hikari. At the end of the episode, Hikari kisses Kei on the cheek.
10	"Anchor ~ Ryuu"; Transliteration: "Shingari·Ryū" (Japanese: 殿·竜)	8 June 2008
The greenhouse is vandalized and it seems that Hikari has a hunch on who may have committed the act. When she comes face to face with the suspect, he challenges the S.A - however, it must be Ryuu who completes the challenge. Old memories and feelings resurface for Ryuu while Hikari learns more about her friends.
11	"Girlfriend ~ Boyfriend"; Transliteration: "Kanojo·Kareshi" (Japanese: 彼女·彼氏)	15 June 2008
When Tadashi lies to his mother about having a girlfriend to avoid attending a matchmaking session, he asks Hikari to pretend to be his girlfriend in hopes of fooling his mother, the director of Hakusenkan.
12	"High Fever ~ Passion"; Transliteration: "Kōnetsu·Jōnetsu" (Japanese: 高熱·情熱)	22 June 2008
After hearing about Hikari's date with Tadashi, Kei arrives from Shanghai with the intention of having her spend the day with him, as stipulated in a challenge he proposed to her earlier. However, he winds up getting a fever and Hikari takes care of him; as she does, Kei reflects on his feelings and relationship with her.
13	"Magic ~ Friends"; Transliteration: "Mahō·Tomodachi" (Japanese: 魔法·友達)	29 June 2008
The S.A must spend three days in separate classes at an ordinary high school as punishment for Tadashi's attempt to deceive his mother. However, the experience becomes difficult for Akira when she encounters a girl who resembles a childhood friend whose friendship with Akira ended badly.
14	"Protecting ~ Apologizing"; Transliteration: "Mamoritai·Gomen ne" (Japanese: 守りたい·ごめんね)	6 July 2008
Akira's determination to protect her new friend, Yui, from Yahiro ends up pushing Yui away instead. Meanwhile, Yahiro's attempt to separate Akira from Yui comes with well-meaning intentions that Akira may never realize.
15	"Moral Code ~ Excellent"; Transliteration: "Jingi·Jōtō" (Japanese: 仁義·上等)	13 July 2008
Hikari must go on a date with Kei on Sunday, as promised when he was recovering from a fever. However, their "date" is interrupted by Sakura Ushikubo, Kei's future fiancée, who takes Hikari away and befriends her. When she agrees to help Sakura find out more about Kei, Hikari begins to feel some unexplainable feelings regarding Kei.
16	"Love ~ Kiss"; Transliteration: "Suki·Kisu" (Japanese: 好き·キス)	20 July 2008
The S.A is invited to a barbecue by Sakura, but they quickly discover that she planned the event so that she can spend some time with Jun, whom she has fallen in love with. While Sakura does everything she can to get a kiss from him, a less than enthusiastic Jun is forced to reveal a secret he has kept from most of his friends.
17	"Restraint ~ Smile"; Transliteration: "Enryo·Egao" (Japanese: 遠慮·笑顔)	27 July 2008
The S.A. is invited to attend and plan a festival at Kokusen Academy by Sakura and Yahiro. Yahiro tries to tell Akira he cares about her, but decides against it when he realizes that she has feelings for Tadashi.
18	"Toudou ~ Karino"; Transliteration: "Tōdō·Karino" (Japanese: 東堂·狩野)	3 August 2008
Upset that Tadashi does not seem to care about her, Akira goes to a matchmaking party with Sakura. When Tadashi apologizes to her, she becomes angry at herself for causing trouble. Yahiro helps Tadashi find a way to comfort her, and Tadashi decides to bring Akira to a viewpoint that they had been to when they were children.
19	"Singing Voice ~ Bad Guy"; Transliteration: "Utakoe·Warumono" (Japanese: 歌声·悪者)	10 August 2008
Megumi asks Yahiro out, claiming to have a crush on him, but he thinks there's more to it and will only believe her if she can win a "game" where she must make him say he liked their date. After he helps her with her voice, Megumi realizes she feels more than just pity for him. Meanwhile, Hikari catches a cold and the rest of the SA go to see her. When Hikari's parents leave her friends to take care of her, they find the feverish Hikari doing outrageous things.
20	"Switch ~ At the Edge"; Transliteration: "Suitchi·Gakueppuchi" (Japanese: スイッチ·崖っぷち)	17 August 2008
Hikari, Kei, and Jun attend the opening of a new athletic park and run into Sakura. Jun avoids Sakura, who chases after him in hopes of discovering his true feelings for her, while Hikari and Kei must deal with the scores of girls that Jun's alter ego keeps attracting.
21	"To Match Up ~ To Come True"; Transliteration: "Kanau·Kanau" (Japanese: 敵う·叶う)	24 August 2008
Hikari meets Aoi Ogata, a member of the Takishima Group who finds Kei important to him and is willing to do anything for Kei. When Aoi decides Kei is better off studying in London, Hikari must prove she's worthy of being Kei's rival. However, this meeting with Aoi causes Hikari to think about her true feelings for Kei.
22	"Love ~ Weird"; Transliteration: "Koi·Hen" (Japanese: 恋·変)	31 August 2008
Hikari struggles to figure out her feelings for Kei and finds it increasingly awkward to be around him. After spending the day together, she realizes she loves him - but stops short of a confession. Meanwhile, Aoi has approached the Director of Hakusenkan and leaves her with no choice but to lock up the S.A's greenhouse for reasons unknown.
23	"SA ~ FA"; Transliteration: "SA·FA"	7 September 2008
Thanks to Aoi, the S.A class has been disbanded in order to force Kei to go to London. So that Kei and his friends can remain together, Kei proposes a challenge to Hikari that if she wins, he will bring back the S.A. However, Hikari learns too late what Kei has done in order to bring back the S.A - he has already left for London for her sake.
24	"Hanazono Hikari ~ Takishima Kei"; Transliteration: "Hanazono Hikari·Takishima Kei" (Japanese: 華園 光·滝島 彗)	14 September 2008
Hikari and S.A head to London to find Kei and bring him back to Japan while Kei resigns himself to not seeing Hikari and his friends again. Everyone, including Yahiro and Sakura, overcome the obstacles standing in the way of reaching their friend. When Hikari meets with Kei at last, they finish the challenge he issued her and Hikari lost. They express their true feelings for one another and eventually share a kiss in the air in front of the big clock. When they get back to Japan, Kei and the rest of the S.A members successfully return to school along with getting their greenhouse back.
