= List of S.A characters =

The following is a list of characters from the series, S.A.

The series focuses on Hikari Hanazono, a high school student who holds the second overall position at the elite Hakusen Academy, and her tireless efforts to challenge and hopefully defeat Kei Takishima, the first ranked student and Hikari's rival since childhood, while unaware that Kei is in love with her. Together, they form the Special A class, consisting of the seven top-ranked students of their school, along with their childhood friends Akira Toudou, Tadashi Karino, Megumi and Jun Yamamoto, and Ryuu Tsuji.

== Special A Students ==
Hikari Hanazono (華園 光, Hanazono Hikari)

Voiced by: Yūko Gotō (Japanese); Monica Rial (English)

Hikari is the protagonist of the story. She holds the 2nd position in school for having the best grades. Self-proclaimed as Kei Takishima's greatest rival, she is determined to beat him in any kind of competition. Stubborn, proud, hard headed, kind, and good-spirited, Hikari never backs down from a challenge, especially one from Kei, and cannot turn away from someone who asks for her help. Though she has never beaten Kei at anything, she constantly looks for opportunities to surpass him and is generally unfazed when he defeats her. While she is good at sports and academics, Hikari is notably very bad at teaching and cooking. She is too strong at times, even breaking things in the process. Although she can handle her own in a fight (often against boys), Kei, nonetheless, gets irritated whenever she puts herself in danger.

A kindhearted girl who always worries about others, Hikari sometimes lacks common sense and tends to be unaware towards how people regard her. Her optimistic personality, straightforwardness, and tendency to always see the good in people prevents her from realizing how harsh and cold the real world can be sometimes. Although Hikari is rather sensitive to others, she is quite dense when it comes to love. She is oblivious to the romantic feelings Kei has for her, though everyone else knows that Kei is in love with her. In volume four, Hikari begins to fall in love with Kei, though she does not realize it until volume 6. Hikari felt that if she conveyed her feelings she would lose against Kei, believing that it is all a competition. They eventually admit they are in love with each other and become a couple in chapter 53.

Kei Takishima (滝島 彗, Takishima Kei)

Voiced by: Jun Fukuyama (Japanese); Blake Shepard (English)

Kei is ranked 1st in school, Kei is the son of the CEO of Takishima Corporation, but has been shown to be running parts of it. Handsome, calm, armed with a photographic memory, and the ability to do anything on the first try, Kei is seen as the "perfect" man. However, he is seen to carry an enormous amount of pressure due to his status as heir to the Takishima Corp. He has been Hikari's undefeated rival since childhood, he likes to refer to her as "Miss Second Place", which never fails to provoke her. He usually prefers to do things on his own until Hikari shows him how much fun it can be to work together with others. Kei loves Hikari, a fact that he does not deny, and has loved her since they were children. It always bothers him whenever Hikari pushes herself too hard or causes trouble, but her strong will and determination are the reasons why he admires and respects her. He makes several attempts to express his feelings to Hikari, though is usually thwarted by some sort of misunderstanding on Hikari's part. Kei eventually confesses to her openly in chapter 32 but Hikari, somewhat realizing she may actually be in love with him, mistakes it as a competition. Later on in chapter 52 Hikari reveals that she reciprocates his feelings; the two start dating and become a couple in the following chapter.

Jun Yamamoto (山本 純, Yamamoto Jun)

Voiced by: Tsubasa Yonaga (Japanese); Kirby Brister (English)

Jun is ranked 3rd in school and is Megumi's younger twin brother. The son of a music producer and a talented singer, Jun loves music more than anything else, and is a passionate violinist. Usually quiet and kindhearted, Jun has a split personality which he has concealed from everyone except Megumi and Ryuu. Triggered whenever he is kissed by a girl or receives a lot of affection, he becomes irresistible to nearly all women and is able to charm them effortlessly. His split personality resulted from an hypnotism program that Jun watched as a child and first emerged when he was still in grade six. During a date with a girl, he changed and all the other girls around him became mesmerized by him; this led the girl Jun was dating to hate him and call him disgusting. After he begins dating Sakura, Jun's alternate personality emerges whenever he sees her; however, because Sakura accepts him regardless of his personalities, Jun is able to reciprocate her feelings for him. The only thing that can bring Jun back to his original self is by losing consciousness.

Megumi Yamamoto (山本 芽, Yamamoto Megumi)

Voiced by: Ayahi Takagaki (Japanese); Brittney Karbowski (English)

Megumi is ranked 4th in school and is Jun's older twin sister. She is the daughter of a famous vocalist and music producer and shares her brother's love of music. She is a cute and nice girl with long curly brown hair, who rarely joins in disputes. Megumi is always quiet and refuses to speak because she wants to save her voice for singing. She usually writes on a sketchpad to communicate with others, but will speak when deeply upset (usually in the form of a shout), which generally have devastating after-effects. Her singing usually causes all who listen to her to get knocked out, however Yahiro theorizes that she probably sings very well, but that it needs to be in an open area and at a great distance. She proves this theory correct when on an involuntary date with him, she sings to him from the top of the stairs. She initially asks Yahiro out because she was trying to prevent him from sabotaging Tadashi and Akira's relationship, but eventually began to enjoy their date. They soon begin to develop feelings for each other and start dating, much to Jun and Ryuu's horror. Like Jun, she is very close to Ryuu; she can be fiercely protective of them both, and thinks of Ryuu as much of her family as her brother. Megumi also happens to be bad at sports and dislikes athletic activities.

Tadashi Karino (狩野 宙, Karino Tadashi)

Voiced by: Hiro Shimono (Japanese); Andrew Love (English)

Innocent and carefree, Tadashi is ranked 5th in school. His mother, a fierce and intimidating woman, is the director of the school and the primary reason why he is in the SA; she told him he would be allowed to do whatever he wanted if he became a member of the SA. He suffers from wanderlust and frequently likes to vanish on some journey only to return later for special school events. Often, when he is frustrated, sad, or angry, he enjoys going to a lake he had discovered when he was a child, he has only shown the lake to a few people, among them is Hikari. Tadashi is smarter than he looks and acts, though is usually the character who is most often comically attacked (frequently by Akira and Kei) because of his careless comments or reckless behavior. Tadashi also seems to enjoy playing with puppets, is fond of Akira's cooking, and appears to like provoking her. Tadashi has been in love with Akira since they were kids, but never acted on his feelings due to his carefree personality. However, he soon begins to get jealous when Akira begins to go on arranged dates with potential husbands chosen by her family, much to her dismay. He encourages her to not go on anymore dates and stay with him instead. They soon begin dating after this and are the first couple in S.A. to officially date.

Akira Toudou (東堂 明, Tōdō Akira)

Voiced by: Hitomi Nabatame (Japanese); Luci Christian (English)

Akira holds the 6th position in school and is the daughter of the owner of an airline company. Akira is motherly, strong, elegant, and is seen to love to dote on cute girls such as Hikari and Megumi. Akira is very enthusiastic about her afternoon tea, and has even constructed her own kitchen on campus. She prepares food from other countries like bagels, and tea that originated from other nations and loves to host parties when she can. Despite her strong outwards, she is shown to be very lonely as she did not have many friends growing up. Because of Akira's parents, she often played with Kei and Yahiro during her childhood days which often intimidated other kids due to their status. Due to this, she greatly treasures her S.A. friends.

Akira loves Tadashi, but never accepted her feelings due to his carefree and wild personality. This changes Akira's parents ask her to go meet with possible suitors for marriage which she does reluctantly. These dates however make her very upset and lead to her confessing her feelings to Tadashi to which he reciprocates. It is later shown that they are officially dating making them the first couple of S.A.

Ryuu Tsuji (辻 竜, Tsuji Ryū)

Voiced by: Kazuma Horie (Japanese); Chris Patton (English)

Ryuu holds the 7th position in school, although his test scores are a poor reflection of his intellectual prowess. He is in 7th place mainly because of the twins - Megumi tends to fall asleep and Jun becomes bored during the test, which results in Ryuu focusing the majority of his attention on them instead of his own exam. As a result, it is suggested that Ryuu could actually be on par with Hikari or Kei. He is the son of the CEO of a sports company and one of his family's clients is Yahiro's family. He has been close to Megumi and Jun since they were very young; it is evident that he cares for the twins very much and that the three of them see each other as family. An even-tempered and kindhearted person, Ryuu loves animals, going as far as to construct an animal enclosure, which includes monkeys and elephants, in his own apartment and is good with children.

Ryuu falls in love with a girl named Finn whom hails from a small country and has to hide her gender in order to become ruler one day. Ryuu eventually finds out her true gender and is the first to do so. After spending some time with her, it becomes evident that he is falling for her and the two start dating

== Supporting characters ==
Yahiro Saiga (雑賀 八尋, Saiga Yahiro)

Voiced by: Kisho Taniyama (Japanese); Clint Bickham (English)

A carefree young man with a sinister side, Yahiro has known both Kei and Akira since they were children. He holds the distinction of having beaten Kei once during their childhood in a game of tag which Kei lost because Yahiro had locked the door to the roof to prevent Kei from winning. Yahiro attends Kokusen Academy, another high school, and is the heir to the Saiga Financial Group, a group that is even higher in status than the Takishima group. Despite his tendency to provoke his friends, he is kinder than he appears and seems to enjoy watching how his friends will react rather than any lasting harm.

Because Yahiro's attitude towards others often upset them, he had very few friends as a child aside from Akira and Kei; his relationships with both of them eventually became strained and distant from his overprotective attitude toward Akira, whom he harboured feelings for. After learning how Akira's friend Sayo only befriended her to take advantage of Akira's privileges and status, Yahiro used extreme measures to drive Sayo away. He never told Akira why he had done so, leading her to believe Yahiro had been motivated by jealousy, and he develops a hatred for those who exploited the wealthy. As a result, Yahiro chose not to become friends with anyone until he met Sakura; at first, he had rejected her offer to become friends with her, but complied after they realize they have a lot in common. Yahiro still is in love with Akira, but eventually accepts her offer of friendship since he realizes that she is in love with Tadashi. In order to distract him, Megumi goes on a date with him, but both have fun on the date and develop feelings for each other. Megumi and Yahiro start dating much to the dismay of Ryuu and Jun.

Sakura Ushikubo (牛窪 桜, Ushikubo Sakura)

Voiced by: Natsuko Kuwatani (Japanese); Hilary Haag (English)

Sakura is the daughter of the head of Ushikubo Medical Manufacturing Group and is Kei's first marriage meeting (or omiai) partner to appear in the series. While she does not consider Kei her type, describing him as a "dark lord" rather than a "prince", she considers him a possible marriage partner because his abilities would be advantageous to her family's business. Upon meeting Jun, Sakura falls in love with him at first sight, as he fits her ideal of someone who was a "prince", and accepts his split personality. She begins to date Jun soon after; however, because of her forceful personality, she is uncertain if Jun reciprocates her feelings until he admits to her that he does.

Sakura hates dishonest people with a passion, and her family's motto is centered around honesty, as well punishing and loathing dishonest people. She is a very headstrong, honest, and aggressive girl whose personality is similar to Hikari which is why they become great friends. She attends the same school Yahiro does and sometimes plans stuff out with him (whether the plans be good or evil) and enjoys making things extravagant. Sakura first appears in volume 4.

Aoi Ogata (緒方 蒼, Ogata Aoi)

Voiced by: Kōji Yusa (Japanese); David Matranga (English)

Aoi Ogata is a junior secretary of President Takishima, Kei's grandfather, and often serves as the President's emissary. A young man of exemplary ability, he is nineteen years old. Aoi has a cold and calm character, and has always been expressionless, not smiling even once, but is actually kindhearted and socially awkward in some respects. Like Kei, he has the ability to see something only once and memorize it, though his ability made him a victim of teasing as a child. He first met Kei when he was eight and Kei was five, and came to admire and deeply respect Kei, coming to see him as an almost kindred spirit. He first appears in chapter 27.

Aoi initially appears when he is sent to Japan from London, on orders to convince Kei to transfer to London, which had been planned by Kei's grandfather. When Aoi discovers what is causing Kei to hesitate, Aoi tries to eliminate the problem: Hikari. His various attempts, including threats and bribery, all fail due to Kei's interference and Hikari's own stubborn nature. Though Aoi does not relent his attempts to persuade Kei to move to London, he comes to respect Hikari as someone who makes Kei happy and sincerely likes her. After Hikari learns how much Aoi admires Kei, she and Aoi form the "After School Takishima Fan Club," in which Aoi is the president while Hikari's job is to primarily send photos she takes of Kei to Aoi. Aoi eventually realizes that he should not pressure Kei into the situation that he is not ready for and also realizes that he is most at peace when he sees Hikari and Kei smiling.

Finn Coupe Schuzette the 2nd (フィン・クープ・シュゼット(2世), Finn Kuppu Shuzetto (2 sei))

Finn is the prince of a small country whose true gender has been concealed from the public. She initially appears as a reluctant participant in a series of arranged marriage meetings Kei's grandfather sets up for Hikari. When Hikari flees from the meeting, Finn approves of her on the spot, since Hikari fits the exact description of Finn's ideal person: a woman with long dark hair possessing a sweet yet tough personality who wears a red dress. After helping Hikari escape, Finn follows her to Japan with the intention of proposing to her. The SA later discover that Finn's mother fits the description of the ideal person Finn wants; Hikari tells Finn that it's a wonderful thing to look up to her mother so much before adding that she and Finn can still be friends. Afterwards, Finn enrolls in Hakusenkan and tries using Ryuu to get closer to Hikari, but ends up becoming very good friends with him. However, her feminine behavior towards him confuses Ryuu until he learns her true gender. Finn's exact ranking in Hakusenkan has not been revealed, but it is known that she is in C class. She first appears in chapter 47.

Ryuu discovers not long after meeting Finn that the prince is actually a girl; in Finn's country, the law states that the country must be ruled by a male and if the heir is a female, she will be raised as a male. Upon explaining this to Ryuu, she asks that he keeps her secret as they will be severely punished if it is revealed. Shortly after Hikari discovers Finn's secret, Finn and Hikari attempt to convince Finn's father to allow Hikari to return to Japan rather than face life imprisonment in Finn's country. The issue is resolved when it is revealed that Finn's mother is pregnant and the baby will be a boy; Finn is revealed to be a girl to everyone else and her unborn brother will become the heir to the throne. She and Ryuu also become a couple, and she starts dressing up as a girl at the conclusion of the series.

== Takishima Family ==
Sui Takishima (滝島 翠, Takishima Sui)

Voiced by: Kaori Shimizu (Japanese); Clint Bickham (English)

Sui is Kei's younger brother and resembles a younger version of Kei. Initially, he dislikes Kei because he finds living with him disgusting and thinks of him as a robot wearing human skin. Because Sui feels very inferior to his brother, who is good at everything, he believes that he cannot reach Kei's level and he refuses to take his studies seriously. However, when he sees that even his "perfect" brother can become desperate and caring, Sui develops a huge brother complex. Sui likes to call Hikari "Stupid Girl", but approaches her frequently when he thinks that Kei needs help. He is in grade 6, class B at Hakusen Academy elementary school division.

Satoru Takishima (滝島 暁, Takishima Satoru)

Voiced by: Megumi Ogata (Japanese); Clint Bickham (English)

Kei and Sui's dad, age 36, who always looks young and baby-faced. He is very energetic and outgoing. Though he is the CEO of the Takishima company, he likes to escape from work and lets Kei handle his job, usually because people at business meetings tend not to take him seriously as a result of his young appearance. To Kei's chagrin, his father also frequently tends to drag his son off to meetings, occasionally in foreign places. Satoru also possesses superb fighting skills and trained in his youth to be as strong as a pro-wrestler; he particularly enjoys Hikari's company because it means they can fight, which Kei usually prevents from happening. He is a good friend of Hikari's father, whom he met through their mutual love of pro-wrestling. Before marrying Midori and into the Takishima family, his surname was Utagawa (宇田川).

Midori Takishima (滝島 碧, Takishima Midori)

Midori, age 37, is Kei and Sui's mother who works overseas in Australia. Both of her sons inherited their looks from her, so they bear a strong resemblance to her. She is obsessed with shopping and longs for the day when Kei will ask her to buy something for him. In Chapter 57, she spends time with Hikari and Kei and goes shopping, but becomes discouraged that Kei still will not ask for anything in particular until Hikari tells her that he only asks for his "mommy". She and Kei's father met when they were in college; Satoru's attempts to be "cool" failed to impress her but when she saw his true self, she immediately decided she wanted to marry him. Her relationship with her father, President Takishima, is strained.

Kaname Takishima (滝島 要, Takishima Kaname)

Voiced by: Kazuya Ichijo

Kei's grandfather, Kaname Takishima, is the head of the Takishima group and is a powerful man in the business circle. However, he is rarely seen by others, including his own family members. He makes his first appearance in chapter 25, when he makes a phone call to Kei's father. When Hikari speaks with him over the phone, he plants the idea in her head that Kei is burdened by her very presence. She meets him face to face in Chapter 59, when President Takishima tries to convince Hikari to transfer schools. He disapproves of Kei's relationship with Hikari and makes many attempts to separate them, such as sending Aoi, arranging marriage meetings for Hikari in London, and arranging a marriage between Kei and a girl named Alisa. The President expresses a strong dislike of Hikari and the mere sight of her sickens him. It is eventually revealed that he feels that he and Hikari share similarities that will make the people they love suffer; as a result, he fears that if Kei remains with Hikari, Kei will suffer much like his late wife, Izumi, did.

Izumi Takishima (滝島 泉, Takishima Izumi)

The deceased grandmother of Kei and Sui, and Midori's mother, Izumi appears to have been a gentle and understanding woman well loved by her family. She died from a serious illness when Midori was still a teenager and her death is the reason why Midori's relationship with her father is so strained. When Kaname left her to attend a meeting at her request, she became concerned for her husband's safety when the weather turned bad and attempted to search for him. When Kaname found her, Izumi had collapsed and her condition rapidly worsened. In her final moments, she asked for her steward, Kuse, in her final moments instead of her husband and Kaname believed she hated him for leaving her. Midori blamed her father for her mother's death and continued to resent him for never visiting her mother's grave, unaware that her father had tried many times, but felt too ashamed to do so. Years later, Kei manages to convince his grandfather to visit Izumi's grave in Australia, where it is revealed that Izumi's final request had been for Kuze to plant the flowers that Kaname would give her whenever he apologized over her grave. Upon seeing this gesture, Kei's grandfather is able to accept Hikari.

Nagi Takishima (滝島 凪, Takishima Nagi)

A beautiful girl with unbelievable strength, Nagi is Kei's cousin and is a year younger than he is. She appears during a brief vacation the SA take at Akira's villa, where they intend to celebrate Kei's coming birthday. Extremely arrogant and full of pride, Nagi proclaims herself to be Kei's fiancée and loves him very much. However, she quickly becomes jealous of Kei and Hikari's closeness with one another and ends up acting unpleasantly towards the rest of the SA in order to get Kei's attention. Upset that Kei, the only person she feels comfortable around, cares more about Hikari, Nagi tries to get rid of Hikari, who comes to see that Nagi only wants to please someone she cares about. Afterward, the two reconcile and become friends.

== Hanazono Family ==
Jiro Hanazono (華園 次郎, Hanazono Jirō)

Voiced by: Atsushi Imaruoka (Japanese); Jason Grundy (English)

Hikari's father is a carpenter and lives in the old shopping district of Tokyo. As a fan of pro-wrestling, he taught Hikari how to fight when she was a child. Through his interest in pro-wrestling, Jiro met Kei's father and they introduced their children to one another when Hikari and Kei were six years old. After Hikari was defeated by Kei, she begged her father to allow her to enroll in the same schools as Kei in order to obtain the opportunity to defeat him. Headstrong and hot-headed like his daughter, Jiro agreed and has since supported her endeavours to defeat her rival. He and Kei's father are friends.

Atsushi Hanazono (華園 亮, Hanazono Atsushi)

Voiced by: Mitsuhiro Ichiki

Atsushi is Hikari's older brother, a calm individual who does not fail to give Hikari his honest opinion. He is currently a junior in high school and attends a normal high school. Unlike Hikari, he doesn't like fighting and he has refrained from any physical fights and yelling since he was little. This is because when they were very young, Hikari saw him beating up a boy who hit her and his facial expression was so scary for her that she fainted. However, when he feels his sister is in danger he breaks away from his peaceful nature and will not hesitate to beat someone up. Even now, Hikari still becomes terrified whenever he becomes truly angry.

Masako Hanazono (華園 昌子, Hanazono Masako)

Voiced by: Makiko Nabei (Japanese); Shelley Calene-Black (English)

Hikari's mother is a kind and good-natured person who seems to accept Hikari's activities, whether it is taking care of Kei overnight or suddenly travelling to London, without too much fuss. She frequently welcomes Hikari's friends to her house, usually without warning on Hikari's part. However, she does lament that Hikari is unusually strong for a girl (such that she finds it difficult to even see Hikari as a girl at times) and absolutely refuses to allow her daughter to enter the kitchen, well aware of Hikari's destructive inability to cook.

== Other characters ==
Alisa Appleton (アリサ・エイプルトン, Arisa Eipuruton)

Alisa is the fifteen-year-old granddaughter of Theo Appleton, the Takishima group's biggest stockholder. She likes to eat without limit. When Kei is trying to move the main branch of the Takishima group to Japan, one of the conditions to do so was to convince Alisa to study in Japan. To accomplish this, Kei intended to use Alisa's love of food by introducing her to Japanese food; while Alisa had been set on Mexico because she wanted to eat Mexican tacos, she realized how hard Kei had been trying and decided to study in Japan after all. Soon afterward, Kei's grandfather arranges for Kei and Alisa to be engaged, though the arrangement is called off when Aoi takes over as the new CEO of the company. Alisa, curious to see what the girl Kei loves is like, meets with Hikari in Japan and began to give her lessons on to be a good girlfriend. She eventually gives up when she finds that Hikari is unable to directly say that she loves Kei. What Alisa wants most is to know what it feels like for a man to say he loves her. She later develops feelings for Ryuu, and is heartbroken when she discovers he is in love with Finn, who reciprocates his feelings. At the conclusion of the series, she attends Kokusen, the same school as Yahiro and Sakura.

Iori Tokiwa (常盤 庵, Tokiwa Iori)

As of the beginning of Hikari's 2nd year of high school, she is tied 2nd place with Iori Tokiwa, the second son of the head of the Tokiwa Hospital. He has a sickly younger sister who has been receiving medical treatment outside the prefecture and has only recently returned to Tokyo. Upon his introduction, Iori's score on the most recent examination results in the rankings of everyone below Hikari to drop by one place. He also wants to get first place, so Hikari sees him as both a rival and a friend. He dreams of becoming a beautician, so he works part-time in order to earn money, even if it is against school rules to do so, and lives in one room apartment by himself. He develops feelings for Hikari and intends to compete with Kei for Hikari, who is largely unaware of Iori's romantic feelings toward her. After Hikari agrees to grant him a wish if he obtains first place, Iori ties with Kei on the midterm exams and tells Hikari to break up with Kei, though he later brushes it off as a joke. He eventually realizes that Hikari loves Kei and for his wish, he asks Hikari for them to always remain good friends. He first appears in chapter 76.

Sumire Karino (狩野 菫, Karino Sumire)

Voiced by: Atsuko Tanaka (Japanese); Shelley Calene-Black (English)

Tadashi's mother, age undisclosed, is the director of Private Hakusen Academy. Little is known about her and she never appears in front of the students. A woman whose actions speak for themselves, she is strict and intimidating. She is the primary reason why Tadashi entered the SA class and has threatened to punish him if he gets a lower rank than fifth place. In the past, she frequently punished Tadashi when he failed to please her and does not hesitate to do so in the present when he offends her, often extending the punishment to the rest of the SA if she deems fit. She and her husband were really popular in school when they were still students. As Tadashi stated, his parents always had a boyfriend and girlfriend.

Chitose Saiga (雑賀 千歳, Saiga Chitose)

Voiced by: Ami Koshimizu (Japanese); Brittney Karbowski (English)

Chitose is the younger brother of Yahiro and is about nine years old. He initially appears in chaper 13 of the manga, when the S.A go to Hawaii for summer vacation and Ryuu (and by extension, the rest of the SA) is forced to entertain Chitose because he is the son of a client for his family. He is close to Ryuu, much to the chagrin of the twins, and it is implied that he has known Kei for a long time. Like his older brother, he dislikes poor people, which leads him to treat Hikari differently from others at first. However, when Hikari shows genuine concern for his well-being despite how badly he treated her, Chitose quickly becomes attached to her.

Yui Oikawa (及川 唯, Oikawa Yui)

Voiced by: Noriko Shitaya (Japanese); Shannon Emerick (English)

When the S.A is punished by the director of the school as a result of Tadashi lying to her, they are forced to attend a regular high school where Akira meets Yui, a girl who resembles her childhood friend Sayo. Initially wary, Akira avoids contact with her, but eventually apologizes and befriends her. However, Akira's fear that Yahiro would break up her newfound friendship results in Akira using extreme measures to protect Yui, who begins to feel awkward around her friends. When Yahiro investigates her for Akira's sake, he discovers that Yui stole some of Akira's jewellery and threatens her so that she will stay away from Akira. Though Yui had done so reluctantly because her family had financial issues that were forcing them to move, she agrees to Yahiro's demand, but she feels that she needs to say goodbye to Akira and almost gets hit by a car in the process. Yahiro saves her and they end up in Yahiro's home, where Akira finds them. When Akira believes that Yahiro has hurt Yui, Yui clarifies that Yahiro saved her and apologizes to Akira for stealing her jewelry. Happy that they are still friends, Akira ends up helping Yui's family and they keep in touch.

Hajime Kakei (筧 肇, Kakei Hajime)

Voiced by: Yoshinori Fujita (Japanese); Clint Bickham (English)

First appearing in chapter five, Hajime Kakei is the Student President at Hakusenkan and holds first place in the class 2-A. He is frequently hospitalized for feeling weak and relies on money to get what he wants. He begins to send various challenges to the SA when nobody appears at his talk show; since none of the SA members wanted to attend his show, nobody else in the student body wanted to either. Because of Hikari's open and kind nature, he seems to develop a crush on her, though is always scared off by Kei before he gets any chance to express his feelings. He is not very popular among his classmates, most of whom do not share his animosity towards the SA.

Kuse (久世, Kuse)

Midori Takishima's personal assistant, Kuse is a helpful gentleman who attends to various aspects of Midori's life, such as maintaining her home in Australia and arranging her social events, like her birthday party. He has been employed by the Takishima family for a long time; prior to working for Midori, he was the personal steward of Midori's mother, Izumi. As such, he is aware of details of concerning the Takishima family that others are not, from what kind of food Kei likes to the complete circumstances regarding Izumi's final wishes.

Rin Yamamoto (山本 鈴, Yamamoto Rin)

The mother of Megumi and Jun, age 40, Rin is well known as a genius vocalist who frequently travels the world to perform concerts, having just returned from Germany to Japan. She is cheerful and energetic and, like Kei's father, looks much younger than she actually is. The twins have not seen her in two years and are notably surprised when she drops by to visit them when she happens to have a concert in Japan. Rin is apparently very protective of her children; in response to a letter Megumi had written to her mother when she believed that she had been jilted, Rin reveals a rather bloodthirsty streak and comically pulls out a gun to go and attack the boy who supposedly rejected her daughter. Rin first appears in chapter 85.

Shinobu Tsuji (辻 忍, Tsuji Shinobu)

Shinobu, age 18, is Ryuu's older sister. She makes a brief cameo from behind at the beginning of chapter 65, but makes her first actual appearance in an extra comic in the S.A fanbook. Shinobu rarely appears before others, to the extent that Ryuu remarks that even he rarely sees her. An apparently kindhearted young woman, she loves her younger brother greatly to the extent that she has a room filled with photos of him and regularly writes about his daily activities in her diary. When she notes that the Yamamoto twins appear to be drifting apart from him, Shinobu also notices that Finn has been hanging around Ryuu more. She particularly enjoys seeing Ryuu's expression when he is miserable and Ryuu usually endures her attempts to cause it, but draws the line when she tries to encourage Finn to do the same. Out of guilt for using Finn to make Ryuu suffer under the false pretense of teaching her to be a good girlfriend to Ryuu, Shinobu agrees to stop and apologizes. After learning the truth, Finn expresses the desire to see both Tsuji siblings smile and, out of her own experience being raised as a boy to treat girls kindly, charms Shinobu into smiling sincerely and happily. Shinobu subsequently develops a liking for seeing Finn and Ryuu's happy expressions instead.
