= Voice Over! Seiyu Academy =

Japanese manga series

- Seiyū ka-!
- Cover of the first tankōbon volume as published by Hakusensha

声優かっ!
- Genre: Coming-of-age
- Manga
- Written by: Maki Minami
- Published by: Hakusensha
- English publisher: US: Viz Media
- Magazine: Hana to Yume
- Original run: June 20, 2009 – February 5, 2013
- Volumes: 12

Voice Over! Seiyu Academy (声優かっ!, Seiyū ka-!; lit. "A Voice Actor!") is a shōjo manga series by Maki Minami. The series started serialization in the 14th issue of the biweekly manga magazine Hana to Yume on June 20, 2009. In order to accurately present the voice acting business in the manga, the company 81 Produce and the professional Tokyo Animation Institute were involved in references and research.

== Plot ==
Hime Kino is a 15-year-old girl who attends Hiiragi High School Academy, one of the top schools in the nation, for its voice acting department. Hime's biggest dream is to one day become the voice of a main character in one of the most popular shōjo manga series in Japan, "Mahou Senshi Lovely Blazers". This is difficult to achieve, however, as her voice is not suitable as a professional voice actress, resembling that of a gorilla, thug or even an old hag.

== Characters ==
Hime Kino (木野 姫, Kino Hime)
Voiced by: Yū Asakawa
Hime is the protagonist of the story and has aimed to become a voice actress ever since her encounter with the talented voice actress Sakura Aoyama as a child. She is energetic and determined, but lacks great talent in the subject she wants to perfect the most: voice acting. However, the head teacher of the department saw great hidden talent within her and allowed her to enter the voice acting department despite her underdeveloped voice acting talents. Whenever she introduces herself and attempts to make a cute, girly voice, it turns out to be a very thick, scratchy, middle-aged man voice. Thus, she earns the nickname "Gori-Hime" (roughly, "Gorilla Princess") among her classmates. However, during the 2nd-year vs. bottom 4 dropouts Snow White showdown, Hime portrays an alluring voice for the prince in Snow White, gaining the attention of not only Kudou Senri, but the popular Producer of Idol Unit AQUA named Haruka Yamada. Later on when she is recruited by Producer Yamada, he decides to debut her as a male voice actor. Thus, she leads a double-life under the name Shiro. She belongs to GGC Productions. After finally realising that she is in love with Kudou Senri, Mizuki confess to her. At the end of the series, it is presumed that she is now the voice actress of Lovely Blazer and is married to Kudou Senri. It is also seen that she is encouraging a little girl named Miu like how Sakura Aoyama encouraged her in the past.
Senri Kudou (久遠 千里, Kudou Senri)
Voiced by: Tomokazu Sugita
Senri is a first-year student in the Hiiragi Academy's voice acting department and the son of Sakura Aoyama, the actress whom Hime admires. He is already a professional voice actor in the voice acting industry, despite only being 15 years old. He is also a good singer, good-looking, and has astounding grades. He shows a cold-hearted attitude toward Hime once he finds out she admires his mother and chooses to ignore her since she doesn't interest him in the least. However, when she portrays the prince's role in Snow White, he helps her out when nobody else is available. He also tries to help her practice her cute voice, but is too distracted by her smile. Even though he portrays a cold exterior, he has a soft spot for small animals. For some reason, this sometimes allows him to soften up around when he occasionally associates Hime with a cat. He is currently active in the anime Lesson Detour. It also seems that he has a close relationship with Shiro, who is actually Hime (he eventually found out that Shiro and Hime are the same person and does not plan to expose this secret). He falls in love with Hime later on in the series. At the end of the series, it is presumed that he is now the director of Lovely Blazer (with Hime as one of the voice actress) and is married with Hime.
Mizuki Haruyama (春山 瑞希, Haruyama Mizuki)
Voiced by: Jun Fukuyama
Mizuki Haruyama is a 2nd-year in Hiiragi Academy's acting department and, along with Shuuma, is one of the Idol Unit AQUA and mediated the Snow White showdown. He's gentle-hearted, with a mysterious, more sinister side due to his painful past. When Mizuki was 10 he became friends with a girl named Sana who was known for failing at everything. When she entered Junior High she decided to become an actor at the same time Mizuki entered the entertainment business. Due to her lack of success Sana gave up on her dream. This greatly hurt Mizuki who blamed himself for 'abandoning' Sana, and who'd made her dream his own. Since then they slowly drifted apart, causing Mizuki to lose one of his only true friends. Hime is the first person in a long time that he's shown interest in becoming friends with as she greatly resembles Sana. As of lately Mizuki has begun to question himself about his feelings towards Hime. He shows jealousy whenever Hime and Senri are together even going so far as to make sure Hime doesn't get near him. As of chapter 52, he realized that he is actually in love with Hime. He belongs with GGC Production and one of the two(except Senri)that was informed by Director Yamada that Hime is actually Shiro to help her in her further work. At the near end, he says he needs to work harder and become more mature so that Hime might even come to fall in love with him later.
Tsukino Todoroki (等々力 月乃, Todoroki Tsukino)
Voiced by: Mako
Tsukino is a first-year student in the voice acting department. She is one of the bottom 4 dropouts simply because her voice is too soft. She feels insecure about her soft voice, but takes a deep liking to Hime when she compliments her soft voice. Tsukino is involved with the black arts and has been known for cursing others, especially Mitchi. At the end of the series, she is seen becoming an Idol Voice Actress.
Shou Takayanagi (高柳 翔, Takayanagi Shou)
Voiced by: Junji Majima
Shou is a first-year student in the voice acting department. He is one of the bottom 4 dropouts due to his violent temper and inability to read kanji without furigana attached to them. His loyalty to his friends is strong and he promises Hime and the others that if anyone messes with them, he'll send them to their death in a minimum of 20 seconds. His hopes to become a voice actor voicing delinquent characters. However, he feels determined to develop other sides of him that surface when Ume takes a liking to him. Despite his violent exterior, he is rather shy around girls since he has little experience with them. At the end of the series, he is seen working with Sound Director Yajima.
Mitchel "Mitchi" Zaizen (財前 ミッチェル "ミッチー", Zaizen Mitchel)
Voiced by: Daisuke Namikawa
Mitchel is often called by his nickname "Mitchi". He is one of the 4 dropouts of the voice acting class. He lived in Monaco until he was 7 years old. His voice is excellent, but the reason he is in the dropout class is because he refuses to give up his foreign accent. He is full of himself, and he easily breaks under pressure. He was supposed to be the prince in their Snow White showdown, but Tsukino cursed him when he belittled Hime's talents, thus causing him to fall extremely ill before their performance. He often takes a leadership role in the dropouts' group. At the end of the series, he is seen designing anime figures
Haruka Yamada (山田 遥, Yamada Haruka)
He is a producer for GGC Production, and the producer of the popular Idol Unit AQUA. He often checks out the voice acting department to scout new talent. In actuality, he visits simply to check up on Senri and tries to convince him to join his newest production. However, after hearing Hime do the prince's role he becomes quite interested in scouting her as well. When she doesn't do very well at the one-line thug role he assigned her a few days later, he wonders if he misjudged her, only to be blown away in awe by her final attempt. He fires her, only to reveal that he has bigger plans for her in the future. Ever since then, he has planned to scout her for his own production as well. When he comes to scout a second time, after meeting Hime's mother and realizing that she thinks Hime's sister is more popular and important than Hime, and that Hime still continue to smile, so he promises her that he will help her accomplish her dream if she can do the same for him. At the near end, he is seen talking with Director Yajima saying he would like to develop the talent of a girl who might be Hime.
Shuuma Kawai (河井 周麻, Kawai Shuuma)
He is a 2nd-year in Hiiragi Academy's acting department and one of the Idol Unit AQUA boys. He was one of the mediators of the 2nd-year vs. 4-dropout Snow White Showdown. He is rarely seen without his partner, Mizuki Haruyama. He is overprotective of Mizuki and causes his fangirls to harass Hime. After Mizuki calms his wrath by punching him, he is reduced to simply giving Hime evil glares and giving some sarcastic remarks towards Hime which earns him some smacking and glares from Mizuki. He later reveals Mizuki's past to Hime in the hopes that she will stop unknowingly torturing Mizuki through her presence. He later comes to accept Hime somewhat though he still acts stubborn whenever she is with Mizuki. He eventually warms up to Hime(as Shiro) when she helps him on stage where he forgots his microphone. He belongs with GGC Production and one of the two(except Senri)that was informed by Director Yamada that Hime is actually Shiro to help her in her further work.
Akane Kino (木野 茜, Kino Akane)
Akane is the 10-year-old sister of Hime. She is the picture of perfection to her parents, which causes her to feel incredibly guilty that her parents do not treat Hime as well as her. She is constantly worrying about Hime.
Ume Ichijou (一条 梅, Ichijou Ume)
Voiced by: Kana Hanazawa
Ume is a first-year in Hiiragi Academy's art department and the leader of the Idol Unit AQUA followers. She draws cartoons for online communities. When Hime, Shou, Tsukino, and Mitchii are preparing for a noon broadcast, they discover Ume and try to get her to draw their storyboard for them. However, she has troubles coming up with the perfect male role, but when Shou saves her from falling down a flight of stairs, she finds her motivation and becomes close to Hime and her friends. At the end of the series, she is seen becoming an animator.
Sakura Aoyama (青山 さくら, Aoyama Sakura)
Sakura Aoyama is a successful actress who started out as a voice actress for the shōjo anime series Mahou Senshi Lovely Blazers. When Hime was a child, Sakura helped her by covering an ice cream stain on Hime's dress, calling her a genuine princess. She is Senri's mother.

== Media ==
=== Manga ===
Seiyū ka-! debuted in the 14th issue of the shojo manga magazine Hana to Yume. The manga is the second manga series by Maki Minami, who created the popular series S · A: Special A. The first tankōbon edition of the manga was released on December 18, 2009, by Hakusensha. Viz Media has published the manga in English.

==== Volume list ====
No.	Original release date	Original ISBN	English release date	English ISBN
1	December 18, 2009	978-4-59-219061-5	October 1, 2013	978-1-4215-5970-4
2	April 19, 2010	978-4-59-219062-2	December 3, 2013	978-1-4215-5971-1
3	July 16, 2010	978-4-59-219063-9	February 4, 2014	978-1-4215-5972-8
4	October 19, 2010	978-4-59-219064-6	April 1, 2014	978-1-4215-5973-5
5	April 19, 2011	978-4-59-219065-3	June 3, 2014	978-1-4215-5974-2
6	June 20, 2011	978-4-59-219066-0	August 5, 2014	978-1-4215-5975-9
7	September 20, 2011	978-4-59-219067-7	October 7, 2014	978-1-4215-5976-6
8	December 20, 2011	978-4-59-219068-4	December 2, 2014	978-1-4215-5977-3
9	May 18, 2012	978-4-59-219069-1	February 3, 2015	978-1-4215-5978-0
10	September 20, 2012	978-4-59-219070-7	April 7, 2015	978-1-4215-5979-7
11	February 20, 2013	978-4-59-219068-4	June 2, 2015	978-1-4215-7342-7
12	March 19, 2013	978-4-59-219642-6	August 4, 2015	978-1-4215-7726-5

=== Drama CD ===
A special Seiyū ka-! drama CD was included in the Hana to Yume magazine that was released on January 20, 2010. This drama CD was released to commemorate the release of the first tankōbon edition of Seiyū ka-!. A second limited Drama CD was subsequently released in commemoration of the publishing of the 2nd tankōbon volume. The voice cast remains the same as in the first drama CD, and includes two new cast members, Jun Fukuyama and Kana Hanazawa. Included in the drama CD is an original song composed by Maki Minami herself and performed by MAKO. The second drama CD was included in the Hana to Yume magazine that was released on May 30, 2010.
