= List of Durarara!! characters =

The following is a list of characters that appear in the light novel series Durarara!!.

== Main characters ==
=== Celty Sturluson ===
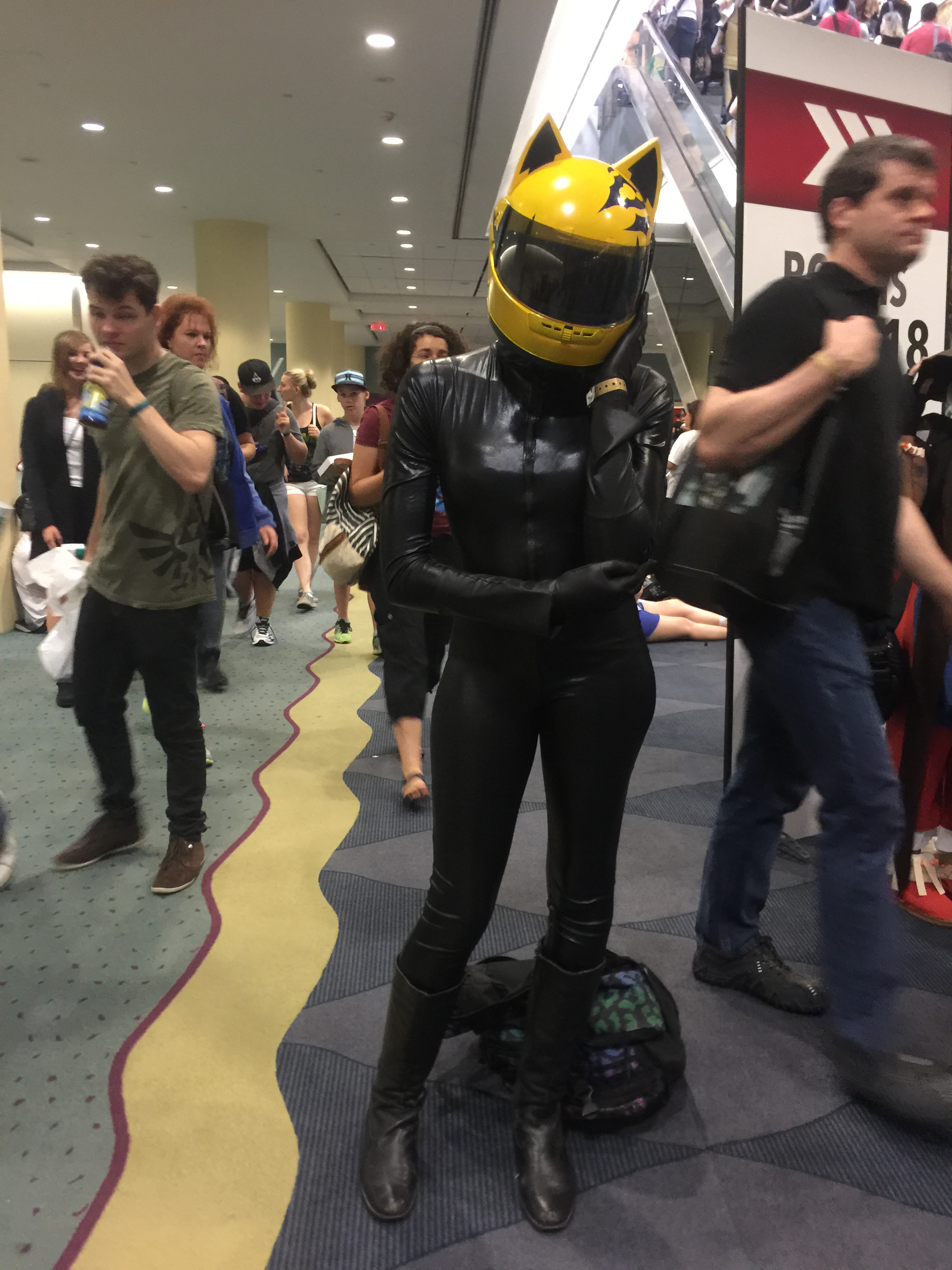
A cosplay of Celty Sturluson at Fan Expo Canada 2016 in Toronto.

Celty Sturluson (セルティ・ストゥルルソン, Seruti Sutururuson)
Voiced by: Miyuki Sawashiro (Japanese); Kari Wahlgren (English)
Online Alias: Setton (セットン)
A member of the Dollars. Also known as "The Black Biker" or "The Headless Rider", she is a Dullahan from Ireland who came to Japan looking for her stolen head. Her motorcycle is actually a disguised headless horse called a Cóiste-Bodhar. She has no heart and perceives via unknown sensors that are not located on the head; she's explained her "vision" is wider than a human's, but not a complete 360°. The physical strength she possesses is above human, though not quite on par with Shizuo Heiwajima. She is also capable of manipulating a shadow-like, durable substance to form objects ranging from gloves to chariots at her will as well as use the shadow-like substance to alter her outfits to go with different occasions. Celty has lived with Shinra for the past twenty years. Celty has developed a reputation as an urban legend, with many of the rumors circulating about her being true. She was initially hesitant about revealing her true nature to anyone; however, upon revealing it to Mikado, who reacted with awe rather than fright, she became far more open to doing so. She works as an underground courier, often in collaboration with Izaya despite not particularly liking him, and wears a helmet when she goes out and communicates via a PDA. Later, she becomes one of Mikado's and Anri's most trusted allies. She enjoys online chatting, television and DVDs. Over the course of the series, her relationship with Shinra intensifies; eventually, she says that she is in love with Shinra. She has a habit of punching Shinra in the stomach whenever he talks about his love for her. She tends to get mad when Shinra says she does not need her head. Despite being a supernatural creature, she is afraid of extraterrestrials and has developed a fear of traffic officers as they started pursuing her frequently. Her biggest fear, however, is that if her head is destroyed, the same may happen to her. Unbeknownst to Celty, Izaya has possession of her head before Kasane stole it and gives it back to its rightful owner. Upon being restored afterwards, Celty became amnesic with Shinra deciding to help her regain her memories or make new ones as she attempts to readjust to life in Ikebukuro again. Her name is a reference to Snorri Sturluson, who wrote the Prose Edda, where Valkyries appear. Celty also appears in Shin Megami Tensei: Devil Survivor 2 as a playable character per downloadable content.

=== Mikado Ryūgamine ===
Mikado Ryūgamine (竜ヶ峰 帝人, Ryūgamine Mikado)
Voiced by: Toshiyuki Toyonaga (Japanese); Darrel Guilbeau (English)
Online Alias: Tarō Tanaka (田中 太郎, Tanaka Tarō)
A very shy first-year high school boy who moves to Ikebukuro thanks to encouragement from his best friend, Masaomi Kida. Originally from Saitama Prefecture along with Masaomi, he moved in hopes of having a more exciting life. At first, Mikado appears meek and heavily trusting but does show moments of self-confidence. A running gag throughout the series is that characters often comment on his fanciful name whenever they meet him. It is later revealed that he is the only remaining creator of the Dollars, a gang in the series and by extension its leader. He is infatuated with Anri, but has never found a chance to tell her. Mikado often gets advice from Izaya Orihara, particularly in relation to the Dollars and his need to seek out a life that is not ordinary. As the series progresses, Mikado begins to show a darker, more calculating side to his personality, and also becomes the temporary leader for the Blue Squares, contracting with Aoba in the sixth novel by stabbing him in the hand with a pen. Mikado's ultimate goal is to live a happy life with Masaomi and Anri, but his methods gradually put him at odds with them.

=== Masaomi Kida ===
Masaomi Kida (紀田 正臣, Kida Masaomi)
Voiced by: Mamoru Miyano (Japanese); Bryce Papenbrook (English)
Online Alias: Bakyura (バキュラ)
A resident of Ikebukuro and Mikado Ryūgamine's best friend from childhood. He was the one who encouraged Mikado to come to Ikebukuro, having moved there three years prior to the series. Masaomi is a jokester and playboy, frequently telling cheesy one-liners and hitting on girls, including Anri. Though this was originally his true persona, it is later revealed that it became a mask to hide his inner depression following his girlfriend Saki Mikajima getting kidnapped and injured during a gang war between the Blue Squares and Yellow Scarves, the latter of whom he led at the time during his middle school years. After Anri is injured during the Slasher incidents and the rising presence of the Dollars, he is forced to become the leader of the Yellow Scarves once more and seek revenge for his friend. Because he had once been the 'shogun (leader)' of the Yellow Scarves, he possesses a talent in fighting, and it has even been implied that he had taken down countless gangs single-handedly during his 'shogun' years. He despises Izaya for manipulating him when he first formed the Yellow Scarves, but returns to him again for information about the leader of the Dollars and discovers it is Mikado. He leaves Ikebukuro with Saki after the conflict between the three main forces in Ikebukuro. Masaomi's main goal is for Mikado to never learn the truth about Ikebukuro and live a happy life with him and Anri.

=== Anri Sonohara ===
Anri Sonohara (園原 杏里, Sonohara Anri)
Voiced by: Kana Hanazawa (Japanese); Michelle Ruff (English)
Online Alias: Saika (罪歌) and "Singsong"
A bespectacled girl who attends the same school as Mikado and Masaomi. She is the class representative along with Mikado. She is rather quiet and timid and seems very close to Mikado and Masaomi, but she tends to keep to herself. Though she knows Mikado's feelings for her, she considers herself unable to feel "love" towards anyone. She is somewhat popular, even though she feels uneasy about it. She feels as if she needs to rely on somebody to move on, specifically Mika when she was younger and currently Mikado and Masaomi, and thus considers herself a parasite. As a child, Anri was forced to witness her mother murder her abusive father with a katana called Saika, later revealed to be a copy of the original. Her inability to love negates Saika's "love" for humans and thus makes Anri able to control the blade. She seems to be a skilled swordswoman, being able to handle Saika with great skill. After defeating Haruna, she gains control over the "Saika-children" that Haruna created. After a talk with Celty, she decides to use this ability for the best of the city. Anri also becomes aware of Masaomi's identity as the leader of the Yellow Scarves, but does not understand why he has taken the position at first only later to find out it was for her and Mikado's sake.

=== Izaya Orihara ===
Izaya Orihara (折原 臨也, Orihara Izaya)
Voiced by: Hiroshi Kamiya (Japanese); Johnny Yong Bosch (English)
Online Alias: Kanra (甘楽), Chrome (クロム) and "Nakura"
Izaya is an "info broker" who sells information to clientele who ask him for it. He is the main antagonist of the first half of the series, before gradually being supplanted by Kasane. A borderline sociopath and sadist, Izaya often claims to love all humans as a collective due to their unpredictable nature (with the exception of Shizuo Heiwajima due to him completely lacking this quality) and enjoys manipulating people in order to gauge their reactions. These situations often lead to injury and misery, forcing those involved to go to great lengths to rectify the situation or give up entirely. He is a master of parkour, having perfected his technique after years of fighting with Shizuo. He is also quite skilled with his flick-blade, as he is implied to be the only one capable of leaving numerous cuts on Shizuo (and his bartending suit) whenever they fight in the novels. In the anime, he shaves a gang member's head bald without the man noticing it. He is considered to be one of Ikebukuro's strongest men. Izaya's ultimate goal is to create a gang war between Mikado, Masaomi, and Anri, where only he remains as victor; he believes that Celty, as a dullahan, is basically a valkyrie and that if such a gang war were to take place, she would show him whether or not there is an afterlife.
In the past, Izaya attended Raira Academy with Shinra, Kadota, and Shizuo (whose life he made miserable since their mutual hateful rivalry began). At the beginning of the series, Izaya suspects that Mikado is the creator of Dollars (and is later proven to be correct) and knows the identities of the leaders of the three main forces in Ikebukuro. As a member of the Dollars, Izaya was also responsible for spreading the Dollar's website password thus recruiting many members (unbeknownst to Mikado) and has used his membership as an excuse to secretly keep Celty's head.
After a leave of absence after the Yellow Scarves arc, Izaya hijacks Masaomi's handle in order to manipulate Mikado whilst simultaneously using Akane Awakusu in a scheme to having the Awakusu Group kill off Shizuo. However, he was interrupted after Jinnai Yodogiri stabbed him as a warning for his interference. Upon making a recovery, Izaya assembles a small army composed of Namie Yagiri, Ran Izumii, Mikage Sharaku, Haruna Niekawa, Kisuke Adabashi, Slon, Kine, and the Dragon Zombie gang. At the climax of the events that follow, Izaya finally tries to kill Shizuo once and for all, and is nearly successful but is thwarted by Celty. In the ensuing fight, Izaya, while heavily injured, dares Shizuo to kill in front of multiple witnesses as a final attempt to prove that Shizuo is a monster. But Vorona stabs Izaya at the last second to prevent this outcome. However, before she can kill him, a stun grenade is thrown that allows a near-dead Izaya to escape. Izaya survives thanks to Celty partially healing him before Manami and Kine get him out of Ikebukuro. Though his fate remains a mystery to the residents of Ikebukuro at the start of Durarara!! SH, many assuming he had a role in the new chain of events. Izaya, who uses a wheelchair, admits to not being ready yet to return home as he continues his informant activities in another part of Japan. Izaya also appears in Shin Megami Tensei: Devil Survivor 2 as a playable character per downloadable content.

=== Shizuo Heiwajima ===
Shizuo Heiwajima (平和島 静雄, Heiwajima Shizuo)
Voiced by: Daisuke Ono (Japanese); Crispin Freeman (English)
A blonde man who is always seen wearing designer sunglasses and a bartender's suit. Although quiet and nondescript for the most part, he easily becomes angered, launching in uncontrollable rages and fighting with incredible strength which leads to broken bones and property damage. Despite this, Shizuo hates violence and wishes for a quiet and peaceful life. Despite his simple and unrefined fighting skills (namely his use of road signs, trash cans, and vending machines as weapons), he is considered to be the strongest fighter in the series. In the novels, Shinra describes Shizuo's ability as the naturally unlimited form of human strength, which he dubs "adrenaline power", that can give people superhuman strength in times of emergency. Because of this, Shizuo was often hospitalised due to the enormous strain on his body. In addition, Shizuo is capable of often superhuman parkour moves, a skill he obtained naturally from years of hunting down Izaya Orihara.
He is also a member of Dollars, although he left the group in Volume 6 after some members of the Dollars resorted to kidnapping (after being given the idea by Izaya) to settle a dispute with a rival gang. Shizuo works as a bodyguard in Ikebukuro for Tom, a debt collector and his senpai, being offered the job after he was fired as a bartender. Tom is one of the few people Shizuo doesn't get angry with, as well as the person who convinced Shizuo to bleach his hair (in order to scare away people who might try to fight him). He is close to and incredibly protective of his younger brother, Kasuka, who is a top idol under the show business name Yuuhei Hanejima and will become incredibly angry when strangers mention his name. Shizuo is also the only person who is able to read Kasuka's facial expressions and emotions. He is also a long-time friend of Celty, often having long conversations with her and even working with her on occasion.
Shizuo hates Izaya with a burning passion, becoming enraged at the mere sight of him, though he has stated that he wouldn't mind letting Izaya live as long as he stayed away from Ikebukuro. Before Izaya moved to Shinjuku, it's said that the pair would fight outside Sunshine 60 on a daily basis, only stopping when Izaya escaped or when Simon broke them up and forced them into his restaurant. Although he and Izaya Orihara are on bad terms, Shizuo is actually quite friendly with Izaya's younger sisters, Mairu and Kururi, who aren't afraid of him and may even prefer him to their brother.
His first and last name translates literally, and ironically, into "serene man" and "peaceful island" respectively. He also appears in Shin Megami Tensei: Devil Survivor 2 Record Breaker as a playable character per downloadable content.

=== Shinra Kishitani ===
Shinra Kishitani (岸谷 新羅, Kishitani Shinra)
Voiced by: Jun Fukuyama (Japanese); Yuri Lowenthal (English)
Online Alias: Indoor Scholar (白面 書生, Hakumen Shosei)
A young underground doctor who lives with Celty and is also in love with her. He stays indoors mostly, and wears a white lab coat even when not working as a doctor. Shinra's father is also a doctor and Shinra has participated in surgeries with his father since childhood, most notably a vivisection on Celty. Shinra attended to the same primary school as Shizuo, and has since then been interested in his unlimited strength in times of anger. In fact, he rather enjoys it when Shizuo makes use of his strength and is amused by the fights between Shizuo and Izaya. He first met Izaya in middle school and has been friends with him ever since. Shinra is well-informed with news of Ikebukuro's underground, such as the location of Celty's head and the sword 'Saika' which allowed Celty's head to be severed from her body. Despite knowing this, he keeps a secret from Celty out of fear that he will lose her if she finds her head, as the head may have a different will than Celty herself. After Celty realizes Shinra had kept her head's location from her the entire time they have a falling out but have since reconciled. Shinra seems to have the "capacity" to tell what Celty is feeling, much to her surprise since she doesn't have a head to show her emotions. He has a great interest in unexplainable phenomena. His online screen name is revealed to Anri in one of the chat sequences.

=== Aoba Kuronuma ===
Aoba Kuronuma (黒沼 青葉, Kuronuma Aoba)
Voiced by: Hiro Shimono (Japanese); Kyle McCarley (English)
Online Alias: Pure Water 100% (純水100%, Junsui Hyaku Pāsento)
Introduced in volume 4 of the Durarara!! novels, Aoba is a first year student in Raira Academy. He has a bright personality and is always seen smiling – calling Mikado 'Mikado-Senpai', but has also a darker side to him. He's described as being akin to "a younger version of Orihara Izaya". He is revealed to be the Blue Squares current leader – but gives the position to Mikado for yet unknown reasons. Aoba seems to fear Mikado a little, since the incident in Volume 6, where Aoba is stabbed in the hand by a ballpoint pen he gave Mikado when they performed the agreement; Aoba also reveals that he and Izaya have underestimated Mikado and that neither of them fully understand his true character It is revealed in the more recent chapters that in his elementary school years, his older brother Ran Izumii abused him to amuse himself. In return, Aoba set a fire in Ran's apartment for "revenge" and let Ran take the blame when the adults thought the fire started from cigarettes. When their parents divorced, Aoba went to live with his mother and took on her surname, Kuronuma. A few years later, he formed Blue Square and ceded its leadership to Ran. When Aoba first mentions Ran in the novels again, he calls him 'Aniki'. His name "Kuronuma Aoba" translates to "black swamp" and "blue leaf" respectively. "Izumi" – his former last name before his parents divorced – translates into "fountain".

== Supporting characters ==
=== Van Crew ===
The Van Crew is a group of friends who travel around Ikebukuro in a van. Though seemingly harmless and amiable, in reality the group are vigilantes who formerly belonged to the Blue Squares, but defected and became part of the Dollars. They do good deeds around the city in the name of the Dollars. At one point, their van's car door was ripped off by Shizuo Heiwajima; Walker and Erika replaced the door, only to give the van a distinctive look by having different anime characters (most notably Miyuki Shiba from The Irregular at Magic High School) painted on the side. Notably, all of the characters' names are references to other authors affiliated with Dengeki Bunko, and Walker and Erika, being major otaku, frequently reference other novels in the imprint, such as Spice and Wolf, Sword Art Online, Toradora!, Black Bullet, and Bludgeoning Angel Dokuro-chan.

==== Kyohei Kadota ====
Kyohei Kadota (門田 京平, Kadota Kyōhei)
Voiced by: Yuichi Nakamura (Japanese); Steve Blum (English)
Online Alias: MONTA
Originally part of the Blue Squares, he is now a member of Dollars. He is nicknamed Dotachin – probably from どた noisy, and ちん a derogatory alteration of ちゃん (it roughly translates as Stomper, and is a pun on his surname) – much to his annoyance, by several characters in the series (mostly Izaya and Erika). He quit the Blue Squares after finding out their leader kidnapped Saki Mikajima and subsequently rescued her along with his gang. His name is a reference to Kouhei Kadono. Though he is not an otaku, he is shown to be a fan of A Certain Magical Index.

==== Walker Yumasaki ====
Walker Yumasaki (遊馬崎 ウォーカー, Yumasaki Wōkā)
Voiced by: Yūki Kaji (Japanese); Brian Beacock (English)
Online Alias: Walker (ウォーカー, Wōkā)
Like his female friend and companion, Erika, Walker is a very passionate otaku and manga reader. He and Erika are nearly always together, and it is implied, on occasion, that the two are romantically linked. He also likes to perform torture by letting the victim to choose a light novel or manga, and carrying out the contents. It is implied that he is a Japanese American. He seems to be carefree. He also keeps a wide dumb smile most of the time. But this smile can hide more than people can see at first glance. His name is a reference to Masaki Okayu.

==== Erika Karisawa ====
Erika Karisawa (狩沢 絵理華, Karisawa Erika)
Voiced by: Ayahi Takagaki (Japanese); Mela Lee (English)
Online Alias: Karua Milk (カルアミルク, Karuamiruku)
Erika is a very passionate otaku and manga reader. She and Walker are usually together, and it is implied, on occasion, that the two are romantically linked. She is equally enthusiastic about manga or novel inspired torture. Though she and Walker agree on almost everything relating to manga and light novels, it is noted she is a major fujoshi, much to Walker's disapproval. Like Izaya, she calls Kadota "Dotachin". Her name is a reference to Mamizu Arisawa and Erika Nakamura.

==== Saburo Togusa ====
Saburo Togusa (渡草 三郎, Togusa Saburō)
Voiced by: Takuma Terashima (Japanese); Spike Spencer (English)
A member of Dollars. He is the driver for Kadota's gang, and the owner of the van they drive in. He can become very mad when his van is damaged, becoming incredibly incensed when Walker and Erika replaced the van's door. He is a major fan of Ruri Hijiribe. His name is a reference to Soichiro Watase.

=== Simon Brezhnev ===
Simon Brezhnev (サイモン・ブレジネフ, Saimon Burejinefu)
Voiced by: Takaya Kuroda (Japanese); Patrick Seitz (English)
A large Black Russian who came to the city to help out his Russian friend, Denis to run a sushi shop. His real name is Semyon (Russian: Семён) but everyone just calls him by the name "Simon" since it is easier to pronounce in Japanese. Even though he is a friendly person, it has been shown that he is a force to be reckoned with as he is able to stop a fight with a man his size with just a single arm and also able to fight on par with Shizuo, who is one of the most feared men in Ikebukuro. He is another member of the Dollars.

=== Seiji Yagiri ===
Seiji Yagiri (矢霧 誠二, Yagiri Seiji)
Voiced by: Kazuma Horie (Japanese); David Earnest (English)
A classmate of Mikado's. He quits school claiming he has something more important to do with his life − to find his "love" and run away with her − and seems to rely on his sister's money for that. Later, it is revealed that he is infatuated with Celty's head, after seeing it suspended in a glass jar when he was a child. After learning the truth of Mika's surgery, he decides to accept her love.

=== Namie Yagiri ===
Namie Yagiri (矢霧 波江, Yagiri Namie)
Voiced by: Sanae Kobayashi (Japanese); Bridget Hoffman (English)
Online Alias: Namie Yagiri (矢霧 波江, Yagiri Namie)
The Chief of Yagiri Pharmaceuticals and sister of Seiji Yagiri. She harbors feelings for her brother. She is behind the recent human hunting in Ikebukuro which involves kidnapping people whose disappearance would not be noticed for unknown experiments. She seems to rely on Shinra for some tasks, including keeping their secret. She doesn't like the fact that Seiji is in love with Celty's head. She wants to get rid of what she calls "that thing". After Yagiri Pharmaceuticals ends up merging with another company, she makes a deal with Izaya and becomes his secretary.

=== Mika Harima ===
Mika Harima (張間 美香, Harima Mika)
Voiced by: Mariya Ise (Japanese); Carrie Savage (Season 1), Kira Buckland (Season 2) (English)
Seiji's stalker. She is a friend of Anri whom she has been looking for as she has disappeared from her home. They were very close to each other but they also used each other to look better. While stalking Seiji, she broke into his apartment and discovered Celty's head. Seiji attacked her and called his sister Namie after believing that he had killed Mika. Namie made Mika undergo surgery to her badly-beaten face and added a "scar" to make it appear as though Celty's head had been surgically attached. This causes Mika to be occasionally chased by Celty. After confessing the truth to Seiji, he accepts her and is with him since then.

=== Shingen Kishitani ===
Shingen Kishitani (岸谷 森厳, Kishitani Shingen)
Voiced by: Akio Ōtsuka (Japanese); Doug Stone (English)
Shingen is the father of Shinra. He constantly wears a gas mask, claiming that the air in Tokyo is filthy. His personality ranges from childish for comic relief to intimidating, especially when in front of Izaya and Namie. He offered Celty a place to stay in exchange for being able to dissect her, to which she agreed. Izaya claims that Shinra acquired his twisted personality from Shingen. It is revealed that he was the one who stole Celty's head, using the demon blade "Saika" to sever the soul that connected her head and body. He later sold the sword to an acquaintance who was an antiques dealer, Anri's deceased father, while giving Celty's head to Namie's uncle. He claims that his higher-ups are now more interested in Celty herself than her head.

=== Mairu Orihara ===
Mairu Orihara (折原 舞流, Orihara Mairu)
Voiced by: Eri Kitamura (Japanese); Candalee Whitmore (Season 1), G.K. Bowes (Season 2) (English)
Online Alias: Mai/San (参)
The younger sister of Izaya and twin sister of Kururi, who she is allegedly in an incestuous relationship with. Mairu wears a yellow hooded sweater with dog ears and a short green miniskirt. Both she and Kururi have brown eyes and brown hair, but Mairu wears her hair in a long braid. She also wears glasses and has a sunny personality. Both girls are underestimated by everyone and are capable fighters when needed be, just like their older brother Izaya, but more friendly.

=== Kururi Orihara ===
Kururi Orihara (折原 九瑠璃, Orihara Kururi)
Voiced by: Hisako Kanemoto (Japanese); Candalee Whitmore (Season 1), Bridget Hoffman (Season 2) (English)
Online Alias: Kyō (狂)
The younger sister of Izaya and twin sister of Mairu, who she is allegedly in an incestuous relationship with. Kururi wears a green hooded sweater with cat ears and a short yellow miniskirt. Kururi has a distant personality that sets her apart from her twin sister, but both can handle themselves well. Despite having their older brother to be targeted for death by Shizuo, the sisters are best friends with Shizuo and are infatuated with Kasuka/Yūhei.

=== Chikage Rokujo ===
Chikage Rokujo (六条 千景, Rokujo Chikage)
Voiced by: Yūki Ono (Japanese); Grant George (English)
Online Alias: Rocchi (ろっちー)
Rokujo is the leader of the biker gang Toramaru. He is a ladies man and will not hesitate to protect women if they are bullied. He is relatively strong as he is able to take some hits from Shizuo and fight on par with Kyohei. Chikage also dislikes the Dollars for harming his members in Saitama, but develops a friendship with Kyohei after he decides to help him find the culprit who attacks the Toramaru.

=== Jinnai Yodogiri ===
Jinnai Yodogiri (澱切 陣内, Yodogiri Jinnai)
Original Voiced by: Nobuo Tobita (Japanese); Stephen Mann (English)
Number Eight Voiced by: Shunsuke Sakuya (Japanese); Liam O'Brien (English)
A group of assumedly eight men who act under Kasane in various criminal acts by assuming the identity of her caretaker. While originally head of the Yodogiri Shining Corporation talent agency before Jinnai went into hiding, Yodogiri Number Eight attempts to have Vorona and Slon kidnap Akane Awakusu is ruined by Izaya's own agenda and later stabs the informant upon learning the youth is digging up information on Yodogiri's organization. Number Eight later ends up being gravely wounded when Izaya sends Haruna's "Saika-Children" to kill him.

=== Kasane Kujiragi ===
Kasane Kujiragi (鯨木 かさね, Kujiragi Kasane)
Voiced by: Houko Kuwashima (Japanese); Wendee Lee (English)
Kasane is the supreme antagonist of the series, being the connective tissue between all of the supernatural occurrences in Ikebukuro. Though far more stoic, she is more skilled than Izaya in manipulation, revealed to be part-vampire on her mother's side. While she is technically Ruri Hijiribe's older half-sister, her original name unknown and being the true owner of Saika, Kasane was raised by the original Jinnai Yodogiri and used a group whose members act under her caretaker's name. She also wants Celty, having one of her associates convince Shingen to steal Celty's head for them. Though she attempted to have Izaya killed when he started to dig up information about her group, he learned the truth of "Jinnai Yodogiri" and consider it a liberation. Kasane manages to steal Celty's head and return it to her, later breaking the Dullahan's heart by turning Shinra into one of her "Saika-children."

=== Awakusu Group ===
The Awakusu Group are a moderately influential organization primarily based in Ikebukuro. It is a subsidiary of the Medei Group. Among its members are:

==== Dougen Awakusu ====
Dougen Awakusu (Awakusu Dougen)
Voiced by: Shouzou Iizuka (Japanese); Beau Billingslea (English)
Dougen is the head of the Awakusa Group who is the father of Mikiya and the grandfather of Akane. Those who know Dougen can feel an almost "Santa Claus" vibe that he gives off. He is a fan of Ruri Hijiribe.

==== Mikiya Awakusu ====
Mikiya Awakusu (粟楠 幹彌, Awakusu Mikiya)
Voiced by: Yasuyuki Kase (Japanese); Jamieson Price (English)
Mikiya is Akane's father and the son of Dougen Awakusu. As Dougen's son, he is the heir to the Awakasu Group. Mikiya has an unnamed older brother who works for the Yakuza.

==== Akane Awakusu ====
Akane Awakusu (粟楠 茜, Awakusu Akane)
Voiced by: Misaki Kuno (Japanese); Brianna Knickerbocker (English)
Akane is the daughter of Mikiya and the granddaughter of Dougen. She initially was not aware that her family was part of a powerful yakuza group.

==== Mizuki Akabayashi ====
Mizuki Akabayashi (赤林 海月, Akabayashi Mizuki)
Voiced by: Kappei Yamaguchi (Japanese); Matthew Mercer (English)
Online Alias: Hungry Ghost (餓鬼, Gaki)
Mizuki is an executive member of the Awakusu Group known as the Red Demon (赤鬼). He has a huge scar across his right eye which he had gotten during his first encounter with Anri's mother Sayaka. Mizuki is also protective of Anri after knowing about Sayaka's tragic death and having lingering feelings for Sayaka.

==== Haruya Shiki ====
Haruya Shiki (四木 春也, Shiki Haruya)
Voiced by: Hōchū Ōtsuka (Japanese); Dan Woren (English)
Haruya is an executive member of the Awakusu Group. He seems to be in charge of gathering information and investigating cases related to The Awakusu. Haruya is well acquainted with several prominent characters in the series like Celty, Izaya and Shizuo.

==== Shu Aozaki ====
Shu Aozaki (青崎 柊, Aozaki Shu)
Voiced by: Kiyoyuki Yanada (Japanese); Lex Lang (English)

Shu is an executive member of the Awakusu Group known as the Blue Demon (青鬼). He shares a long and fierce rivalry with Mizuki.

==== Takaaki Kazamoto ====
Takaaki Kazamoto (風本隆秋)
Voiced by: Kanehira Yamamoto (Japanese); Spike Spencer (English)
Takaaiki is a young executive of the Awakusu Group who is very skilled at investigation.

=== Kinnosuke Kuzuhara ===
Kinnosuke Kuzuhara (葛原 金之助, Kuzuhara Kinnosuke)
Voiced by: Keiji Fujiwara (Japanese); Chris Smith (English)
Kinnosuke is, according to Shinra, a motorcycle police officer known for dealing with the most troublesome characters. He has been sent to Ikebukuro to deal with Celty and he thinks of her merely as a monster. He is very proud of the Police and of himself for warning Celty not to mess with them. He is known to be very persistent as he and his men were able to follow Celty for a whole evening, leaving her comically terrified of all cops as a result.

=== Saki Mikajima ===
Saki Mikajima (三ヶ島 沙樹, Mikajima Saki)
Voiced by: Misato Fukuen (Japanese); Cassandra Morris (English)
Online Alias: Saki (サキ)
Saki is a girl who has a god-like idolization of Izaya Orihara. She approaches Masaomi under Izaya's instructions and becomes Masaomi's girlfriend. Later, Saki lets herself be abducted and injured by the Blue Squares under Izaya's instructions. Kyohei, Walker and Erika betray their gang and save Saki, who is immediately hospitalized after having both of her legs broken. After the dispute between the Yellow Scarves and the Dollars, she disappears together with Masaomi.

=== Kasuka Heiwajima ===
Kasuka Heiwajima (平和島 幽, Heiwajima Kasuka)
Voiced by: Daisuke Kishio (Japanese); Blake Lewis (Season 1), Vic Mignogna (Season 2) (English)
Shizuo Heiwajima's younger brother. He is a famous actor under the alias "Yūhei Hanejima". In Vol.3, Shinra explains to Celty the link between Kasuka's true name and showbiz name: the "Hane" in "Yūhei Hanejima" can alternatively be pronounced as "Wa" and "Yū" as "Kasuka"; as such, "Wa-jima-kasuka-hei" is an anagram of "Kasuka Heiwajima". He was scouted to debut after saving the life of a talent scout from Shizuo, who apparently did not appreciate being talked to by that talent scout. He is usually emotionless to the point where he would not hesitate to chop off his own hand on the set of a prank show. He plays a more prominent role in Vol.4, when he meets the killer called "Hollywood", who later turns out to be Ruri, another top idol. They officially become a couple. He later tells Ruri that he felt nervous when with her in his room and that he did not want her to cry.

=== Tom Tanaka ===
Tom Tanaka (田中 トム, Tanaka Tomu)
Voiced by: Katsuyuki Konishi (Japanese); Keith Silverstein (English)
Tom Tanaka is one of Shizuo Heiwajima's close friends from their days at junior high. Tom runs a debt collection agency in Ikebukuro and utilizes Shizuo's notoriety for violence to intimidate people who skip out on paying their debts to Tom. However, Shizuo's rage usually ruins Tom's business as well as his reputation.

=== Ruri Hijiribe ===
Ruri Hijiribe (聖辺 ルリ, Hijiribe Ruri)
Voiced by: Saki Fujita (Japanese); Cristina Vee (English)
Ruri Hijiribe is an idol singer. One of her biggest fans is Saburo Togusa. Her concert in Ikebukuro was sold out, but thanks to Italian ticket vendor Kazutano, Saburo got to see her perform on stage while at front row center. Because of Ruri, Saburo became close to Kazutano more than Kadota and his friends. She officially becomes a couple with Kasuka after he found out that she was the serial killer "Hollywood" and consequently saved her. It is hinted that they may have the start of mutual feelings for each other. She is part vampire, which gives her supernatural strength and abilities, such as her unnaturally fast healing, but includes weakened vampire vulnerabilities, like her dislike of direct summer sunlight and hatred of garlic.

=== Vorona ===
Vorona (ヴァローナ, Varōna)
Voiced by: Mao Ichimichi (Japanese); Brina Palencia (English)
Vorona is a 20-year-old Russian assassin. Her father neglected her when she was young, leading her to indulge herself in her father's collection of books. She has an extensive knowledge of information due to her interest in books and ability to memorize when young. However, upon killing a burglar with a method she learned from one of her books, her father had her trained as an assassin under Denis and Simon. Along with Slon, she was hired to come to Ikebukuro and take out various targets in the city, including Celty and Anri. Vorona has an obsession in fighting against strong opponents, primarily due to a desire to please her father, but ends up being friends with one of them, Shizuo. Her name is Russian for "Crow."

=== Ran Izumii ===
Ran Izumii (泉井 蘭, Izumii Ran)
Voiced by: Atsushi Imaruoka (Japanese); Doug Erholtz (Season 1), Robbie Daymond (Season 2) (English)
Ran is the former leader of the Blue Squares and Aoba's older brother. A sadistic man, he wears a pair of sunglasses with a large burn scar on his right face. He was the one responsible for kidnapping Saki and breaking her legs, at which point the Van Crew rescued her and defected from the Blue Squares, with Walker burning the people responsible (resulting in his scar). After being released from jail for kidnapping Saki, he now works as a freelance mercenary for the Awakusu Group.

=== Mikage Sharaku ===
Mikage Sharaku (写楽 美影, Sharaku Mikage)
Voiced by: Hiromi Igarashi (Japanese); Amanda C. Miller (English)

Mikage is a martial arts teacher of Mairu and Kururi who teaches at the Rakuei Gym. She is one of Izaya's most important allies who helps out regularly on his missions.

=== Haruna Niekawa ===
Haruna Niekawa (贄川 春奈, Niekawa Haruna)
Voiced by: Mai Nakahara (Japanese); Sandy Fox (English)
A former student of Raira Academy who has long back hair and is controlled by Saika. She has an obsession towards her teacher Takashi Nasujima. Haruna briefly works for Izaya to attack Yodogiri.

== Other characters ==
=== Rio Kamichika ===
Rio Kamichika (神近 莉緒, Kamichika Rio)
Voiced by: Haruka Tomatsu (Japanese); Stephanie Sheh (English)
Rio Kamichika is a classmate of Masaomi, and a friend of Anri. Rio lives with her loving parents, but found out that her father was having an affair. She broke the news to her mother, but her apparent apathy led her to believe her normal life was a lie, and became depressed and suicidal. In the anime, this leads Izaya to prey upon her online, though a sympathetic Celty eventually makes her come to terms with it. Rio later joins the Dollars, and is also friends with Chikage's girlfriend Non.

=== Takashi Nasujima ===
Takashi Nasujima (那須島 隆志, Nasujima Takashi)
Voiced by: Yuji Ueda (Japanese); Kirk Thornton (English)
Takashi Nasujima was a teacher at Raira Academy who has a reputation for being lust-driven to young school girls. His latest target was Anri, but was being thwarted at every turn by Masaomi, who informs Anri about Takashi's last rape victim, Haruna Niekawa, and the settlement case that left him almost broke. Nasujima's bad luck went to worse after owing money to the Awakusa Group, a run-in with Celty and being confronted by Haruna as the Slasher. Suddenly, Nasujima was horrified to learn of Anri's true identity as the Slasher and blatantly told him that she despised him. This made Takashi run in fear for his life. Still broke, he tried to mug someone with the butcher knife Haruna used as the fake Slasher, but Takashi was beaten within an inch of his life by his unfortunate choice of mugging target, Shizuo Heiwajima.

=== Hōrada ===
Hōrada (法螺田)
Voiced by: Wataru Takagi (Japanese); Kyle Hebert (English)
Horada is the main antagonist of the second arc, albeit in large part due to Izaya's machinations. He was second-in-command of the Blue Squares until his boss, Ran Izumii, was arrested, and was the person who directly broke Saki's legs. Horada took advantage of the Yellow Scarves' conditional admittance of allowing Blue Squares to become Yellow Scarves simply by switching colors, and it seemed like the truce was over. However, Horada used the Yellow Scarves to commit violent crimes against unsuspecting citizens in Ikebukuro and suspected Dollars members. After the Dollars and the Yellow Scarves stood up against Horada, he and his men tried to escape. With Shizuo's rage destroying Horada's escape vehicle and Kuzuhara's motorcycle patrol surrounding the wrecked car, Horada and his men were arrested and placed behind bars. With Horada's arrest, the Blue Squares were in complete disarray and folded due to in-gang fighting.

=== Slon ===
Slon (スローン, Surōn)
Voiced by: Satoshi Mikami (Japanese); Richard Epcar (English)
Vorona's partner in assassination missions. His name is Russian for "Elephant."

=== Egor ===
Egor (エゴール, Egōru)
Voiced by: Toshiyuki Morikawa (Japanese); Lex Lang (English)
Egor is a Russian assassin who makes his appearance to capture the serial killer "Hollywood" (Ruri). He is an old acquaintance of Simon and Denis. Known to be the seventh most feared hitman in Russian as "The Philosophical Killing Machine."

=== Denis ===
Denis (デニス, Denisu)
Voiced by: Shinya Takahashi (Japanese); Chris Smith (English)
Denis is the owner and chef of Russia Sushi which he runs together with Simon.

=== Kine ===
Kine
Voiced by: Setsuji Satō (Japanese); Liam O'Brien (English)
Kine is a bald-headed man of average build that is always in a business suit. He is a freelance detective who formerly worked as an executive at the Awakusu Group.
