= Love Through a Prism =

Japanese original net animation series

- Key visual

プリズム輪舞曲 (Purizumu Rondo)
- Genre: Coming-of-age; Historical; Romance
- Created by: Yoko Kamio
- Manga
- Written by: Yoko Kamio
- Illustrated by: Maki Minami
- Published by: Shueisha
- Imprint: Margaret Comics Digital
- Magazine: Shōnen Jump+; Manga Mee
- Original run: January 8, 2026 – present
- Original net animation
- Directed by: Kazuto Nakazawa; Tetsuya Takahashi; Saki Fujii
- Produced by: Shou Ootani
- Written by: Yoko Kamio; Saki Fujii
- Music by: Naoki "naotyu" Chiba
- Studio: Wit Studio
- Licensed by: Netflix
- Released: January 15, 2026
- Runtime: 22–40 minutes
- Episodes: 20
- Light novel
- Written by: Yoko Kamio
- Published by: Shueisha
- Published: December 4, 2026
- Volumes: 2
- icon

Love Through a Prism (Japanese: プリズム輪舞曲, Hepburn: Purizumu Rondo) is a Japanese original net animation (ONA) series created by Yoko Kamio and produced by Wit Studio. The 20-episode series was released on Netflix in January 2026. A manga adaptation illustrated by Maki Minami began serialization on Shueisha's Shōnen Jump+ and Manga Mee manga websites in the same month. A two-volume light novel adaptation by Kamio will be released by Shueisha in December 2026.

== Plot ==
Set in early twentieth-century London, the story follows Lili Ichijoin, a Japanese exchange student who enrolls at the prestigious Saint Thomas Art Academy, with the goal of becoming a professional painter. Under pressure from her parents to rise to the top of her class within six months or return to Japan, Lili throws herself into her studies, where she encounters Kit Church, a talented but emotionally distant aristocratic student known for his singular devotion to art. What begins as rivalry between two driven artists gradually develops into a romantic relationship, as Lili's sincerity and perseverance challenge Kit's isolation and reshape his outlook. Their shared pursuit of artistic excellence places their evolving bond at the center of academy life, intertwining personal growth with creative ambition.

== Characters ==
Lili Ichijoin (一条院 りり, Ichijōin Riri)
Voiced by: Atsumi Tanezaki (Japanese); Leader Looi (English)
A talented 20 year-old oil painter and the daughter of kimono makers from Yokohama, Japan. Her mother has given her six months to become the top student at Saint Thomas Art Academy, or else face abandoning her artistic ambitions permanently. She develops feelings for Kit and by the end of the series is in a relationship with him.
Christopher "Kit" Church (キット・チャーチ, Kitto Chāchi)
Voiced by: Koki Uchiyama (Japanese); Christopher Bonwell (English)
A mysterious student who consistently ranks first in assignments. Despite his scruffy nature and eccentricities, he is actually the younger son of a duke from North West England. He later leaves the academy to serve as an ambassador in World War I.
Charles Brant (チャールズ・ブラント, Chāruzu Buranto)
Voiced by: Hōchū Ōtsuka (Japanese); David Sterne (English)
The academy's exacting oil painting professor. He is a fan of William Shakespeare and regularly quotes the playwright.
Dorothy Brown (ドロシー・ブラウン, Doroshī Buraun)
Voiced by: Megumi Han (Japanese); Rebecca Hanssen (English)
Lili's first English friend, housemate, and fellow painting student, a friendly girl who hails from the Cotswolds.
Joffrey O'Brien (ジョフリー・オブライエン, Jofurī Oburaien)
Voiced by: Yōhei Azakami (Japanese); Shaun Mendum (English)
One of Kit's friends, the son of an old, lower aristocratic family from Ireland. He is in the sculpture department.
Peter Anthony (ピーター・アンソニー, Pītā Ansonī)
Voiced by: Shogo Sakata (Japanese); Feliks Mathur (English)
Another of Kit's friends, an artist from Delhi, India.
Shinnosuke "Shin" Kobayakawa (小早川 新之助, Kobayakawa Shinnosuke)
Voiced by: Yuki Kaji (Japanese); Alex Wingfield (English)
Another student from Japan, a talented sculptor who befriends and lives across the street from Lili and Dorothy during their time in London. He develops unrequited feelings for Lili and was arranged to marry her after their return to Japan, but chose to break off the engagement and pursue his dreams in Italy.
Sakura Kobayakawa (小早川 さくら, Kobayakawa Sakura)
Voiced by: Akari Kitō (Japanese); Naomi McDonald (English)
Shinnosuke's mute younger sister.
Take Ichijoin (一条院 たけ, Ichijōin Take)
Voiced by: Yūko Kaida (Japanese); Beth Chalmers (English)
Lili's mother. She has given Lili six months to be the best student at Saint Thomas'; otherwise, Lili will return home to marry and inherit the family's kimono business.
Richard Church (リチャード・チャーチ, Richādo Chāchi)
Voiced by: Junichi Suwabe (Japanese); George Blagden (English)
Kit's older brother, who urges him to accept his responsibilities.
Catherine Astor (キャサリン・アスター, Kyasarin Asutā)
Voiced by: Sumire Uesaka (Japanese); Jane Collingwood (English)
Kit's aristocratic fiancee. After befriending Lili, she decides to break off her engagement with Kit and become a dressmaker.

== Media ==
=== Manga ===
A manga adaptation illustrated by Maki Minami began serialization on Shueisha's Shōnen Jump+ and Manga Mee manga websites on January 8, 2026.

The manga adaptation's chapters are simultaneously published in English on Shueisha's Manga Plus app.

=== Anime ===
The original anime series created by Yoko Kamio and produced by Wit Studio was announced on November 27, 2025. The series is directed by Kazuto Nakazawa, Tetsuya Takahashi, and Saki Fujii and written by Kamio and Fujii, with Naoki "naotyu" Chiba composing the music. Original character designs are provided by Kamio, while Yasuko Takahashi adapts the designs for animation. It was released on Netflix on January 15, 2026, and consists of 20 episodes. The theme song is "Star Flower", performed by Chilli Beans.

==== Episodes ====
No.	Title	Directed by	Written by	Original release date
1	"Black Bread and Iridescent Hope"; Transliteration: "Kuroi Pan to Nijiiro no Kibō" (Japanese: 黒いパンと虹色の希望)	Kazuto Nakazawa; Tetsuya Takahashi	Kazuto Nakazawa; Tetsuya Takahashi	January 15, 2026
Lili Ichijoin, a talented aspiring painter from Japan, arrives in London to attend the prestigious St. Thomas Art Academy. While she is wandering the docks, an eccentric artist points her in the right direction. Lili is introduced to Charles Brant, the painting instructor. As a friendly classmate, Dorothy Brown, shows Lili the top works of art from the school, she remembers her mother's ultimatum -- Lili has six months to become the top student, else she returns to Japan to continue the family's kimono boutique. Lili finds the artist from the docks rummaging through her luggage, and learns that he is Kit Church, the school's best artist.
2	"Feeling Blue"; Transliteration: "Yūutsuna Kibun" (Japanese: 憂鬱な気分)	PENNY	Kazuto Nakazawa	January 15, 2026
Lili attends Brant's class alongside Dorothy, Kit, and Kit's friend Peter. Brant assigns them to paint "an expression of the sky as it appears". The Triple-S, three envious girls, bully Lili and steal her blue paint. Seeing the incident, Kit tosses Lili a tube of expensive paint and she finishes the assignment, ultimately coming in second behind Kit. Brant praises Lili's technical skills but compares her artistry to a draftsman. Kit asks to borrow Lili's bicycle as he wants to see lilies growing in a cave, and invites her to come with him.
3	"Lillies"; Transliteration: "Yuri" (Japanese: ユリ)	Tetsuya Takahashi	Tetsuya Takahashi	January 15, 2026
Kit and Lili wander the countryside in search of the lilies. The two bond over their sketching practices, with Lili introducing Kit to the yatate. Lili relates her admiration of JMW Turner; her desire to be top student surprises Kit. The two careen down a hill, breaking the bicycle, and get caught in a rainstorm. They take shelter in an abandoned shed. Just as Lili is about to confess her limited time at the academy, the two admire a field full of lilies illuminated by the moon. A farmer they met earlier drives them back to London. Back at school, Lili declares to the class that she will overtake Kit.
4	"His Rough Sketch"; Transliteration: "Kare no Rafusuketchi" (Japanese: 彼のラフスケッチ)	Shoichi Horita	Kazuto Nakazawa	January 15, 2026
The students prepare for an exhibition at the National Gallery. Lili meets another new Japanese student, the sculptor Shinnosuke (nicknamed "Shin"), who lives with his younger sister Sakura. At the exhibition, the students learn that Kit is the younger son of the esteemed Henry Church, Duke of Carlisle. The Duke invites Dorothy, Joffrey, Shinnosuke, Lili, and Peter to the Churches' estate, Drunnheim Hall, for the holidays.
5	"Views of a Honey Gold Summer"; Transliteration: "Hanīgōrudo no Natsu no Keshiki" (Japanese: ハニーゴールドの夏の景色)	PENNY	Tetsuya Takahashi	January 15, 2026
The group travels by train to Windermere, and are driven by the family's chauffeurs to Drunnheim Hall. They learn that in addition to the Duke's splendid reputation in government, he is also beloved by the local population. The guests are treated to a feast and the staff lauds their friendships with Kit, though Lili observes tension between Kit and his brother, Richard. Dorothy and Lili stay up late and discuss their families. Later, Lili wakes up and wanders through the mansion. She overhears Richard imploring Kit to give up art and accept his responsibilities as an aristocrat.
6	"An Asymmetrical World"; Transliteration: "Hitaishōna Sekai" (Japanese: 非対称な世界)	Kazuto Nakazawa; Shoichi Hirota; Masaharu Tomoda	Kazuto Nakazawa	January 15, 2026
In a flashback, a young Kit shows a sketch to his ill mother Charlotte. In the present, Henry invites the students to a gala to be held that evening. Lili finds Kit in a hidden garden. At Shin's urging, Kit leads the students to see the family horses, and an Akhal-Teke horse is identified as Kit's steed Aphrodite. Upon learning Lili has nothing to wear to the gala, Kit has the staff dress Lili in a gown and leads her in a dance. Lili meets Lady Catherine Astor, Kit's arranged fiancée. Lili flees the gala and returns to the garden. An envious Catherine explains that the Silver Lily gown has another pair called the Gold Rose inherited by Richard's wife Lady Amelia. Following Catherine's malicious directions, Lili enters peacock territory and sprains her ankle before fainting. The other students tell Kit that Lili is missing, and he realizes she must have gone after Aphrodite.
7	"A Red Rose Has Thorns"; Transliteration: "Akai Bara Ni Wa Toge Ga Aru" (Japanese: 赤いバラには棘がある)	Yoshifumi Sasahara	Kazuto Nakazawa	January 15, 2026
After Shin finds Lili passed out in the garden, the two return early to London with Sakura. There, Lili finds that she has overextended her budget. At Dorothy's suggestion, Lili successfully obtains a job translating a book on ukiyo-e from Brant. Kit, still reeling from the events of the gala, accompanies Shin to the British Museum. After Shin admits he feels his work is derivative, Kit shows him a replica of Michelangelo's Pietà that inspired him as a child. Later, Peter speculates that Saint Thomas was founded by the Duke. Dorothy and Lili run into Catherine, who commissions Lili to paint her portrait in honor of her debut.
8	"The Perspective of Childhood Friends"; Transliteration: "Osananajimi no Shiten" (Japanese: 幼なじみの視点)	Shigeru Chiba	Tetsuya Takahashi	January 15, 2026
Catherine's criticisms and passive aggressiveness delay Lili's progress on her portrait. Catherine shares her sincere desire to marry Kit, and Lili snubs Kit. Lili runs herself ragged balancing school and her multiple jobs. During one of their sessions, Catherine is surprised to realize her own lack of hobbies. At Dorothy's behest, Shin reaches out to Lili and invites her to dinner. Catherine admires how Lili has painted her, but in a fit of pique, orders her lady's maid Rebecca to dispose of the portrait. Kit catches Rebecca about to throw the painting into the Thames. He scolds Catherine and the two argue. Lili witnesses Kit admit his feelings for her.
9	"A Gradation of Talent and Effort"; Transliteration: "Sainō to Doryoku no Guradēshon" (Japanese: 才能と努力のグラデーション)	Yuka Hashimoto	Kazuto Nakazawa; Saki Fujii	January 15, 2026
As Kit chases after Lili, Catherine ponders her long engagement to Kit and her admiration of dresses like the Silver Lily. Peter confesses his loss of confidence in his art to Lili. Catherine confronts Lili at her lodgings and realizes that Lili loves Kit back. Nevertheless, she invites Lili to her family home, Astoria House, to finish the portrait. To celebrate Shin's sculpture winning the latest critique, the group goes to a pub, but Peter expresses envy at Shin's success and laments his own "ordinary" abilities. Peter and Kit argue about Kit's natural talent and privilege and Peter's need for validation. Lili stops the fight by slapping Kit and pointing out his lack of empathy. Kit admits that he does not think his work is good, and stops attending the academy.
10	"Outlines of Triangles"; Transliteration: "Sankakkei no Rinkaku" (Japanese: 三角形の輪郭)	Daisuke Tsukushi	Kazuto Nakazawa; Saki Fujii	January 15, 2026
To cheer Lili up after the fight, Shin takes Lili to the London Zoo. He tells her he wants to travel to study sculpture in Florence after graduation, in defiance of his family's wishes. Rebecca brings Lili to Astoria House to finish Catherine's portrait. Catherine gifts Lili some of her old dresses, apologizes to Lili for the poor treatment, and thanks her for helping Catherine realize her interest in fashion. In turn, Lili gifts Catherine a kimono and a delighted Catherine requests that the portrait be redone to show her wearing it. They are interrupted by Richard's arrival at Astoria House. He declares that Kit and Catherine are to marry that weekend.
11	"A Portrait in Sepia"; Transliteration: "Sepia-iro no Shōzō-ga" (Japanese: セピア色の肖像画)	Shoichi Hirota	Tetsuya Takahashi	January 15, 2026
Richard explains that Kit has decided to do his duty and is resigning from Saint Thomas. Catherine stands up for Lili against Richard and refuses the marriage. Fearing for Kit's freedom, Catherine and Lili travel to Drunnheim Hall. Kit is not locked up in a tower like Catherine speculated, but explains that he returned to Drunnheim Hall because his father has collapsed. Henry admits that, like Kit, he was a second son with artistic ambitions before unexpectedly inheriting the dukedom. He encourages Kit to return to the academy and assures Catherine that despite the end of the engagement, there is no ill will between their families. Kit and Lili return to London together.
12	"The Golden Ratio Between Them"; Transliteration: "Sorera no Ma no Kōgonhi" (Japanese: それらの間の黄金比)	Jirou Arimoto	Saki Fujii; Kazuto Nazakawa	January 15, 2026
With Kit and Peter still absent from class, Brant announces the term's final critique session is themed around the word "free". A worried Lili arrives at Kit's apartment and finds that he came down from a cold following their return trip. She watches over him as he recovers. After Kit's fever breaks, the two discuss the past issues and reconcile, with Lili thanking Kit for inspiring her. She admits that she is returning to Japan as she failed to submit for the critique session. The group returns to the pub, where Kit and Peter make up.
13	"A Collage of Joy and Sorrow"; Transliteration: "Yorokobi to Kanashimi no Korāju" (Japanese: 喜びと悲しみのコラージュ)	Yoshifumi Sasahara	Saki Fujii; Kazuto Nazakawa	January 15, 2026
Lili travels with Dorothy to meet her family in the Cotswolds. She learns that Dorothy intends to return there and marry Mike, a local boy, despite mutual feelings with Joffrey. The girls affirm their friendship. Upon returning to London, Lili learns that she has placed first in the critique, allowing her to remain in England. Upon seeing that Lili's sketchbook contained a kineograph, Kit convinced Brant to accept it. Lili's success means her and Kit's work will be presented to the royal family, and she has earned a recommendation to the Royal Academy of Art. An overjoyed Lili tries to find Kit, unaware that he has departed London on a train.
14	"Farewell on the Sea"; Transliteration: "Umi de no Wakare" (Japanese: 海での別れ)	Unknown	Saki Fujii; Kazuto Nazakawa	January 15, 2026
Henry has died; after the funeral, Kit and Richard discuss their roles as aristocrats. Richard tells Kit of growing tensions in the Balkans that threaten to engulf Europe in war. Kit agrees to take over his father's diplomatic duties, but wants to complete one final painting before he leaves. Kit invites Lili to the seaside, where he encourages her to continue her dream. Lili makes Kit promise that he will return.
15	"Stormy Crossroads"; Transliteration: "Arashi no Kōsaten" (Japanese: 嵐の交差点)	Tetsuya Takahashi	Tetsuya Takahashi	January 15, 2026
Lili dines with Shin and Sakura. To her delight, she hears Sakura humming. Shin ascribes the change to Sakura's friendship with Lili, and later realizes that Sakura wants him to be true about his feelings. After weeks of preparation, the students' exhibit submissions are finished and displayed. Brant gifts Kit his father's pocket watch and bids him farewell. Kit's painting is of a woman on the shore - his first portrait. As Lili looks for Kit around London, she learns that the heir to the Austrian throne is killed, and Londoners worry about the impending war. At the academy, Kit and Shin run into each other; Kit reveals to Shin that he is quitting painting and tasks Shin with keeping Lili safe.
16	"Colorless Cubism of the Heart"; Transliteration: "Kokoro no Mushoku no Kyubisumu" (Japanese: 心の無色のキュビスム)	Yuka Hashimoto	Kazuto Nakazawa	January 15, 2026
Kit departs the academy before Lili can find him. Shin and Lili receive telegrams from the Japanese Ministry of Education summoning them back to Japan. The next day, Brant announce's Kit's departure from the academy, cancels classes and encourages the students to create art that captures the moment as the global conflict unfolds. Later, he shows Lili an early work of Kit's, a landscape in the shade of lapis lazuli blue he had previously lent her. Brant encourages Lili to find Kit, hinting that Kit may be at a church near the Foreign Office. Lili eventually finds him there and desires to confess her feelings. However, she scolds him on his choices, and remorsefully watches Kit as he leaves.
17	"A Confession Gone With the Waves"; Transliteration: "Nami ni Kieta Kokuhaku" (Japanese: 波に消えた告白)	Shigeru Chiba	Kazuto Nazakawa; Saki Fujii	January 15, 2026
Brant announces Lili's departure for Japan and Peter's transfer to King's College. The Triple-S backhandedly acknowledge Lili's accomplishments and return her blue paint. At a farewell gathering at the pub, Peter admits that his argument with Kit spurred his desire to travel and distribute art, while Joffrey declares he will open his own pub one day. The others are aghast to learn that Kit is giving up painting. Catherine arrives and urges Lili to come to the docks before Kit leaves, and Shin reveals that Kit is going abroad for work in the diplomatic service. The group arrives just as the ship is due to the depart and bid Kit farewell. Lili shouts at Kit not to forget their promise but is unable to confess her feelings.
18	"Five Years Later, an Engagement Ring"; Transliteration: "5-Nen-go, Kon'yaku Yubiwa" (Japanese: 5年後、婚約指輪)	Tetsuya Takahashi	Tetsuya Takahashi	January 15, 2026
Five years later, Lili, Shin and Sakura live in Yokohama. Lili works in her family's kimono boutique and is engaged to Shin, and Sakura has regained her ability to speak. Lili learns from Dorothy's and Catherine's letters that Kit has been declared lost at sea during the war. Both Lili and Shin are reluctant to continue with art, with Shin declining an acceptance offer into an academy in Italy, much to Sakura's disappointment. Some time later, a British ship docks at Yokohama, and Shin sees a person whom he initially believes is Kit at the docks. At an art dealership shopping for a painting frame, Lili and Shin see a portrait of a woman surrounded by lilies that seems to have been painted by Kit. Lili collapses from shock while the shopowners try to recall who gave them the painting.
19	"Drawn to Destiny"; Transliteration: "Unmei ni Michibika Rete" (Japanese: 運命に導かれて)	Shoichi Hirota	Kazuto Nakazawa	January 15, 2026
Lili awakens in Shin's house, convinced that Kit created the painting. She finds Shin's acceptance document to study in Italy. Shin concludes that Kit is both alive and in Yokohama, and the two search for him. Lili finds Kit by the docks. He explains that he ended up in Sumatra after his ship sank and was eventually able to get on the England-bound mail boat following many struggles. Shin also happily reunites with Kit, but upon learning of their engagement, Kit declines their invitation to host him. On the boat returning to England, Kit discards a ticket he had bought for Lili. Meanwhile, Lili is driven to tears upon seeing Kit's sketches from Sumatra. She reads Kit's dedication for her referencing her borrowed blue paint, and is inspired to paint again.
20	"Love Through a Prism"; Transliteration: "Purizumu Rondo" (Japanese: プリズム輪舞曲)	Saki Fujii	Saki Fujii; Tetsuya Takahashi; Kazuto Nazakawa	January 15, 2026
Recalling her time spent in England with Kit, Lili completes a painting inspired by the Drunnheim Hall countryside. As Kit returns to England, Shin resumes work on his half-finished Pieta sculpture. Lili tells Shin that she has rediscovered her love for painting and encourages him to study in Italy. Wanting to pursue their individual artistic paths, the two amicably end their engagement and successfully petition Lili's parents to allow her to return to England. A year later, Lili arrives in England and reunites with Catherine and Dorothy, expanding her family's kimono business with the help of the former. Six months afterwards she meets Kit, who has returned from his global travels, on the seashore where they had previously promised to reunite. The two admit their feelings and kiss under a rainbow. In a post-credits epilogue, Kit and Lili travel to Asia to paint the cave lilies, while Peter, Shin, and Dorothy convene at Joffrey's pub.

=== Light novel ===
A two-volume light novel adaptation, written and illustrated by Kamio, will be released by Shueisha on December 4, 2026.
