= Maki Minami =

Japanese manga author

Maki Minami 南 マキ
- Born: May 20
- Area: Manga artist
- Notable works: Special A

Maki Minami (南 マキ, Minami Maki) is a Japanese manga author best known for the high school series Special A.

== Career ==
Minami was born in Saitama Prefecture in Japan.

In 2001, her short story Day Dream Believer (デイ・ドリーム・ビリーバー) received an Honourable Mention for Hakusensha's 25th Athena awards. She debuted in Hana to Yume's October 2001 issue with a short story titled Faraway Blue (彼方の青, Kanata no Ao).

Maki Minami's longest running series, Special A, began publication in 2003 and ended in 2009. Her subsequent series, Seiyū ka-! began serialization in Hana to Yume in 2009, after the completion of Special A. Her recent works also include the oneshot Ane☆Mone Seikaten (アネ☆モネ 生花店), which appeared in the April 2009 edition of The Hana to Yume.

On October 28, 2022, Minami launched a new series titled Hisureba, Hana in Hakusensha's Melody magazine as part of the magazine's 25th anniversary.

== Works ==
=== Manga ===
List of manga works
| Title | Year | Notes | Refs |
|---|---|---|---|
| S • A: Special A | 2003–09 | Serialized in Hana to Yume; Published by Hakusensha, 17 volumes released | |
| Kimi wa Girlfriend (キミはガールフレンド) | 2004 | Serialized in Hana to Yume; Published by Hakusensha, 1 volume released | |
| Voice Over! Seiyu Academy | 2009–13 | Serialized in Hana to Yume; Published by Hakusensha, 12 volumes released | |
| Ane☆Mone Seikaten - Maki Minami Classic Short Stories (アネ☆モネ生花店～南マキ傑作短編集～) | 2009 (vol.) | Short story collection, serialized in Hana to Yume; Published by Hakusensha, 1 volume released | |
| S • A - Jougai Rantou (S・A ─場外乱闘) | 2012 | Serialized in Hana to Yume; Published by Hakusensha, 1 volume released | |
| Komomo Confiserie (こももコンフィズリー) | 2013–2016 | Serialized in Hana to Yume; Published by Hakusensha, 5 volumes released | |
| Purizumu Rondo (プリズム輪舞曲, Love Through a Prism) | 2026–present | Written by Yoko Kamio; Serialized in Shōnen Jump+ and Manga Mee, published by Shueisha. | |
