= Kazuma Horie =

Japanese voice actor (born 1976)

- 堀江 一眞
- Born: July 23, 1976 (age 50); Tokyo, Japan
- Other names: Hidehisa Horie (堀江秀尚), Hikaru Horie (堀江光)
- Occupation: Voice actor
- Family: Kei Horie (brother)

Kazuma Horie (堀江 一眞, Horie Kazuma; born July 23, 1976) is a Japanese voice actor for anime shows and video games. Some of his major roles are Regulus in Goulart Knights, Seiji Yagiri in Durarara!!, Ryū Tsuji in Special A, Kaname Tanuma in Natsume's Book of Friends, and Snow Lily in Servamp.

== Filmography ==
=== Anime ===
List of voice performances in anime
Year	Title	Role	Notes	Source
2001	Cosmic Baton Girl Princess Comet	Hiroshi Kashima 鹿島洋		
2003	Sortie! Machine Robo Rescue	Tohru Suidohbashi		
2004	Sgt. Frog	Attendant		
2004	Elfen Lied	Ōmori		
2004	My-Hime	Kazuya Kurauchi		
2004	Yakitate!! Japan	Gallery / rookie craftsman ギャラリー / 新人職人		
2005	My-Otome	Kazuya Krau-xeku		
2006	Kiba	Noa		
2006	Kekkaishi	Student		
2007	Over Drive	Audience		
2007	Claymore	Galk		
2007	My-Otome Zwei	Kazuya Krau-xeku	OVA	
2007	Neuro: Supernatural Detective	Akira Horiguchi 堀口明		
2008	Special A	Ryuu Tsuji		
2008	Neo Angelique Abyss	Silver tree knight 銀樹騎士	Also Second Age	
2008–2017	Natsume's Book of Friends series	Kaname Tanuma		
2008	Rosario and Vampire Capu2	Shiro of Sanuki 讃岐の不知火		
2009	Rideback	Kenji Ogata		
2009	Arad Senki: Slap-up Party	Mangin マンジン		
2009	Shangri-la	Shin Eye member シンエイ隊員		
2009	Weiß Survive	Joe	Also R	
2009	Fairy Tail	Nadi, Rustyrose		
2010	Durarara!!	Seiji Yagiri		
2011	Dragon Crisis!	Saiki 斎木		
2011	Inazuma Eleven GO	Mahoro Tadashi		
2012	Ozuma	Tom		
2014	Dragonar Academy	Glenn McGuire		
2014	I Can't Understand What My Husband Is Saying	Kaoru's father		
2015–16	Durarara!!x2	Seiji Yagiri		
2016	Servamp	Snow Lily		
2020	Dogeza: I Tried Asking While Kowtowing	Heavenly Voice		
2021	Hortensia Saga	Alexi Baldebron		

=== Film ===
List of voice performances in film
Year	Title	Role	Notes	Source
2006	Tekkonkinkreet	Takaramachi citizen		
2018	Servamp -Alice in the Garden-	Snow Lily		
2018	Natsume's Book of Friends the Movie: Tied to the Temporal World	Kaname Tanuma		
2021	Natsume's Book of Friends: The Waking Rock and the Strange Visitor	Kaname Tanuma		

=== Drama CD ===
List of voice performances in drama CD
Year	Title	Role	Notes	Source
2007	The Qwaser of Stigmata: Princeeses' Egg	Fool フール		

=== Video games ===
List of voice performances in anime
Year	Title	Role	Notes	Source
1997	Hop Step Aito ☆ Hop Step あいどる☆	Makoto Aihara 相原真琴	SS	
1997	Oh My Goddess	virus ウィルス	Other	
2007	Gakuen Utopia Manabi Straight!	Priest	PS1 / PS2	
2007	Will-o'-the-wisp	Irvin アーヴィン	PS1 / PS2	
2007	Mega Zone 23 Blue Garland	Masamune Oda 小田正宗	PS3	
2007	Record of Agarest War	Radius ラディウス	PS3, also Xbox 360 version in 2008	
2007	Shoukan Shoujo: Elemental Girl Calling	Chris Delgamon クリス・デルガモン	PS1 / PS2	
2008	Haruka: Beyond the Stream of Time games	Nanko star 南斗星君	DS	
2008	Da Capo Girls Symphony	Shimonomiya Ao 四之宮蒼	PC	
2008	Real Rode	Maxi マキシ	PS1 / PS2	
2009	Starry☆Sky: in Summer	Shinya Koguma	PC	
2009	Steal!	Hajime Kusumoto	PC Adult	
2009	Death Connection ja:デス・コネクション	Joshua ヨシュア	PS1 / PS2	
2010	Durarara!! games	Seiji Yagiri	PSP	
2010	Ishin Koinaka Ryoma Gaiden 維新恋華 龍馬外伝	Mochizuki Kameya 望月亀弥太	PSP	
2013	Armored Core: Verdict Day	Foundation 財団	PS3, Xbox 360	
2023	TEVI	Frankie, Roleo	PC, Switch, PS4, PS5, Xbox	

=== Dubbing ===
List of voice performances in overseas dubbing
Year	Title	Role	Notes	Source
2006	Cars	Junior ジュニア		
2015	The Four III	Leng Linqi (Cold Blood) 冷血		
2016	Northern Limit Line	Yoon Young-ha 艇長 ユン・ヨンハ		
2017	Scream Queens	Boone Clemens ブーン・クレメンス		
2017	The Mermaid	Liu Xuan リウ・シュエン		
2018	Fabricated City	Kwon Yoo クォン		
