= S.A (manga) =

Shōjo manga by Maki Minami

- Cover of the first manga volume
- Genre: Romantic comedy
- Manga
- Written by: Maki Minami
- Published by: Hakusensha
- English publisher: AUS: Madman Entertainment; NA: Viz Media
- Magazine: Hana to Yume
- Original run: April 1, 2003 – March 19, 2009
- Volumes: 17
- Anime television series
- Directed by: Miyao Yoshikazu
- Written by: Jukki Hanada
- Studio: AIC, Gonzo
- Licensed by: NA: Sentai Filmworks
- Original network: Chiba TV
- English network: HK: TVB Pearl; PH: TV5
- Original run: April 6, 2008 – September 14, 2008
- Episodes: 24
- Manga

S・A - Street Fight
- Written by: Maki Minami
- Published by: Hakusensha
- Magazine: Hana to Yume
- Original run: 2012 – 2013
- Volumes: 1

S.A (stylized as S・A; pronounced Special A) is a shōjo manga by Maki Minami. The series started serialization in the bimonthly magazine The Hana to Yume in 2003, and moved to the biweekly magazine Hana to Yume in 2004, after running for four chapters. The series ended after 99 chapters on March 19, 2009.

Special A has been licensed for English-language release in North America by Viz Media and in Australia and New Zealand by Madman Entertainment. The series has also been licensed in Germany, Italy, Poland, France and Taiwan.

In 2007, Hana to Yume announced an anime adaptation of the manga. It was animated by Gonzo and AIC and ran for 24 episodes, from April 6, 2008, to September 14, 2008, in Japan.

In 2013, Hana to Yume released a single volume sequel called Special A - Street Fight (S・A(スペシャル・エー) ─場外乱闘─).

== Setting ==
Hakusen Academy is the best school in the prefecture. The classes are separated into A–F based on grades. The A class is only open for the top students in each grade. The top seven within the A class, from first year to third year, are known as the Special A or SA class (hence the title). The members of SA are highly respected and are often seen being elaborately greeted by other students with the exception of few that dislike the SA. The SA class has its own building, a 19th-century styled greenhouse dubbed "The School's Paradise". They also have a kitchen, where Akira makes her afternoon tea. Class attendance is optional, but Hikari is the only one who chooses to attend classes. Their uniform is also different from the standard uniform. The members of the SA have been close friends since elementary school.

== Plot ==
Hikari Hanazono has always been second to Kei Takishima. When they were six years old, their pro-wrestling loving fathers introduced them to each other. Confident that she was the best in wrestling, young Hikari challenged Kei to a wrestling match only to be thoroughly defeated by him. Ever since that fateful incident, Hikari swore to beat Kei in everything - school grades, sporting events and all competitions. To do this, she has enrolled in the same school as Kei since elementary. Now she attends Hakusenkan, an ultra elite school for the wealthy, that costs her carpenter father a lot of money. Hikari and Kei are the top two students in the school, with Kei always ranking first. Due to their ranking, they are part of a special group of kids known as Special A or S.A. for short. While Hikari considers Kei to be her rival, she is completely unaware of Kei's feelings for her. The story follows Hikari and Kei as they become closer and explores the friendships, relationships, and competition between the other S.A. members: Jun, Megumi, Tadashi, Akira, and Ryuu.

== Media ==
=== Manga ===
Originally released by Hakusensha since May 2004, it ended with 99 chapters on March 19, 2009. It was licensed for an English release by Viz Media.

| No. | Original release date | Original ISBN | English release date | English ISBN |
|---|---|---|---|---|
| 1 | July 16, 2004 | 4-592-18131-X | November 6, 2007 | 978-1-4215-1375-1 |
| 2 | December 16, 2004 | 4-592-18132-8 | January 1, 2008 | 978-1-4215-1567-0 |
| 3 | March 18, 2005 | 4-592-18133-6 | March 4, 2008 | 978-1-4215-1568-7 |
| 4 | August 19, 2005 | 4-592-18134-4 | May 6, 2008 | 978-1-4215-1569-4 |
| 5 | November 18, 2005 | 4-592-18135-2 | July 1, 2008 | 978-1-4215-1748-3 |
| 6 | March 17, 2006 | 4-592-18136-0 | September 2, 2009 | 978-1-4215-1749-0 |
| 7 | August 18, 2006 | 4-592-18137-9 | November 4, 2008 | 978-1-4215-1750-6 |
| 8 | November 17, 2006 | 4-592-18138-7 | January 6, 2009 | 978-1-4215-2038-4 |
| 9 | February 19, 2007 | 978-4-592-18139-2 | May 3, 2009 | 978-1-4215-2039-1 |
| 10 | July 19, 2007 | 978-4-592-18140-8 | July 5, 2009 | 978-1-4215-2473-3 |
| 11 | November 19, 2007 | 978-4-592-18141-5 | July 7, 2009 | 978-1-4215-2619-5 |
| 12 | February 19, 2008 | 978-4-592-18142-2 | September 1, 2009 | 978-1-4215-2620-1 |
| 13 | April 18, 2008 | 978-4-592-18143-9 | November 3, 2009 | 978-1-4215-2675-1 |
| 14 | July 17, 2008 | 978-4-592-18144-6 | January 5, 2010 | 978-1-4215-2789-5 |
| 15 | November 19, 2008 | 978-4-592-18145-3 | March 2, 2010 | 978-1-4215-3171-7 |
| 16 | March 19, 2009 | 978-4-592-18146-0 | July 6, 2010 | 978-1-4215-3310-0 |
| 17 | June 19, 2009 | 978-4-592-18149-1 | November 2, 2010 | 978-1-4215-3568-5 |

=== Drama CDs ===
On February 23, 2007, a Special A drama CD was released in Japan. It focuses on Valentine's Day.

Voice cast:

- Hikari Hanazono: Masumi Asano
- Kei Takishima: Kenichi Suzumura
- Tadashi Karino: Masakazu Morita
- Akira Toudou: Yuu Asakawa
- Jun Yamamoto: Souichiro Hoshi
- Megumi Yamamoto: Tamaki Nakanishi
- Ryuu Tsuji: Hirofumi Nojima
- Yahiro Saiga: Daisuke Namikawa
- Sakura Ushikubo: Yumi Kakazu
- Aoi Ogata: Daisuke Ono

A second drama CD was released on June 18, 2008. It focuses around the boys of the S.A class. The CD also includes background music tracks from the anime. A third drama CD was released on August 20, 2008, focusing on the girls of the S.A class and includes more tracks of the background music from the anime. Both drama CDs use the anime cast.

- Hikari Hanazono: Yuko Goto
- Kei Takishima: Jun Fukuyama
- Tadashi Karino: Hiro Shimono
- Akira Toudou: Hitomi Nabatame
- Jun Yamamoto: Tsubasa Yonaga
- Megumi Yamamoto: Ayahi Takagaki
- Ryuu Tsuji: Kazuma Horie
- Sakura Ushikubo: Natsuko Kuwatani

=== Anime ===
In 2007's 21st issue of Hana to Yume, it was announced that S.A would have a 24 episode anime adaptation. The anime began airing in Japan on April 6, 2008.

The anime has been picked up for release in North America by Sentai Filmworks; it is distributed by Section23 Films. The first part of season 1 came out on November 10, 2009, and the second collection was released on January 19, 2010. A complete collection was released on April 4, 2011. The series was re-issued again featuring a new English dub on July 16, 2013.

==== Music ====
1st opening theme
"Special Days" (episodes 1 - 12)
Performed by Yuko Goto, Hitomi Nabatame and Ayahi Takagaki
1st ending theme
"Hidamari no Gate" (陽だまりのゲート) (episodes 1 - 12, 24)
Performed by Jun Fukuyama, Hiro Shimono, Tsubasa Yonaga, Kazuma Horie
2nd opening theme
"Gorgeous 4U" (episodes 13 - 24)
Performed by Jun Fukuyama, Hiro Shimono, Tsubasa Yonaga, Kazuma Horie
2nd ending theme
"Special Gyutto Good Luck!" (スペシャル☆ギュッとGood luck!) (episodes 13 - 23)
Performed by Yuko Goto, Hitomi Nabatame, and Ayahi Takagaki

== Reception ==
The series has received mixed to positive reviews from critics. Katherine Dacey compared the central two characters as "a gender reversed Frank Butler and Annie Oakley", and noted that Kei comes off as "rather sexist". Jennifer Dunbar enjoyed the wish-fulfilment of seeing rich kids "getting to do whatever they want" without being conceited about this, but felt the complications in the last volume were boring. Jason Thompson disliked the "action slapstick" of the first two volumes, but felt that even after the two leads became more fleshed out as characters through their romance that the series was "founded on cliches" and felt the rest of the cast was underdeveloped. Allen Moody of THEM Anime Reviews gave a more positive review of series, giving it 4 out of 5 stars and stating that although the first set of episodes focused too much on the Kei/Hikari rivalry, the later episodes were able to develop the characters more and eventually become likable in their own way.
