= Durarara!!×2 =

- Season 2
- Cover of the first volume BD released in Japan, featuring Celty Sturluson and Mikado Ryūgamine.
- No. of episodes: 36

Release
- Original network: Tokyo MX
- Original release: January 10, 2015 – March 26, 2016

Season chronology
- ← Previous; Durarara!! season 1

The second season of the Durarara!! anime series, titled Durarara!!×2, was directed by Takahiro Omori and produced by Shuka. The episodes are adapted from the light novel series Durarara!! by Ryōgo Narita and Suzuhito Yasuda. It continues from the events in the first television series Durarara!!, and is broken into three episode groups called "cours", or quarters of a year. The cours are subtitled Shō (承; lit. "Understanding"), Ten (転; lit. "Motion"), and Ketsu (結; lit. "Conclusion") respectively. The first cour aired from January to March 2015; the second cour aired from July to September 2015; and the third cour aired from January to March 2016.

Crunchyroll has announced it would stream the series in North America, Central America, South America, Ireland, and the United Kingdom. Aniplex of America licensed the series and is streaming an English dub via Crunchyroll and Hulu. For the first cour, the opening theme is "Headhunt" by Okamoto's, and the ending theme is "Never Say Never" by Three Lights Down Kings. For the second cour, the opening theme is "Day You Laugh" by Toshiyuki Toyonaga, and the ending theme is "Exit" by Revalcy. For the final cour, the opening theme is "Steppin' Out" by FLOW, and the ending theme is "Joker ni Yoroshiku" by PENGUIN RESEARCH.

== Episode list ==
No. overall	No. in season	Title	Directed by	Written by	Original release date
Shō (First cour)
25	1	"A Picture is Worth a Thousand Words"; Transliteration: "Hyakubun wa Ikken ni Shikazu" (Japanese: 百聞は一見に如かず)	Takahiro Omori	Noboru Takagi	January 10, 2015
A live broadcast of Celty Sturluson being chased by Kinnosuke Kuzuhara is shown. By partially transforming her motorcycle Shooter back into a horse, Celty climbs onto the rooftop of a building. She makes a shadow clone riding away on a hang glider, successfully misleading Kinnosuke. Two hours earlier, the news reports about recent murders by a criminal known as "Hollywood", whose nickname was earned as a result of wearing different monster costumes and makeup at each crime scene. Also, Kasuka Heiwajima has a television interview concerning his stoicism, something his manager Max Sandshelt complains about. Later, Celty finishes her physical examination for scientific research for the Nebula Corporation by Emilia Kishitani, who is the second wife of Shingen Kishitani and stepmother of Shinra Kishitani. Shingen appears on Emilia's tablet computer and tells Celty that she is effectively a part of the family. Celty is then paid one million yen for her cooperation. While thinking of what to buy for Shinra, Celty ends up being chased by Kinnosuke. In the present, Celty receives a call from Izaya Orihara, who is watching the live broadcast. Izaya tells Celty to stay away from his workplace until the chaos calms down. After realizing that her paycheck has gone missing, Celty is soon chased by a biker gang wanting a bounty of ten million yen on her head. Mikado Ryūgamine and Anri Sonohara watch Celty as she drives by, with Mikado noting how the city of Ikebukuro has not changed at all.
26	2	"Harmony is the Greatest of Virtues"; Transliteration: "Wa o Motte Tōtoshito Nasu" (Japanese: 和を以て尊しと為す)	Eiji Suganuma	Noboru Takagi	January 17, 2015
At night in a park, Russian assassin Egor attacks a zombie by using a briefcase filled with cash that he grabs near Tom Tanaka. After the briefcase breaks, an enraged Shizuo Heiwajima uses a park bench as a baseball bat to launch Egor and the zombie out of the park. In the newly updated online chat room, Celty tells her friends that she lost her paycheck, prompting Izaya to send the group a link to a video of Max announcing that he will give ten million yen to anyone who reveals the identity of the Headless Rider. When Shinra returns to his apartment, he is sucked into Celty's depressing shadow cocoon, where Celty explains her current predicament. However, Celty leaves Shinra in the shadow cocoon when she receives a call for a job. Two days ago, Raira Academy has an opening ceremony, where Aoba Kuronuma approaches Mikado at the end of class. Aoba mentions that he is a member of the Dollars, suspecting that Mikado is one of the leaders. In a karaoke bar, Mikado and Anri ask Walker Yumasaki and Erika Karisawa to help give Aoba a tour of Ikebukuro. Anri then walks past Egor, and he is unwittingly cut by her demon blade Saika. Shingen tells Anri that he knows about Saika, giving his business card to her before she leaves. At Raira Academy, Mairu Orihara and Kururi Orihara are each bullied when their desks are vandalized with graffiti by Tsukiyama and her friends. While Mairu confronts Tsukiyama's friends, Aoba rats out Tsukiyama to the teacher. This leads Tsukiyama and her friends to interrogate Aoba after school, but Tsukiyama's bag catches on fire. Mairu later reveals to Aoba that Kururi put paint thinner in Tsukiyama's bag. To show their thanks and appreciation, Mairu and Kururi each proceed to kiss Aoba. Shortly after Shizuo sends Egor flying out of the park, Mairu and Kururi find Celty's paycheck under a parked car and encounter Egor in critical condition. Egor requests for them to take him to the restaurant Russia Sushi.
27	3	"Adding Insult to Injury"; Transliteration: "Nakitsura ni Hachi" (Japanese: 泣き面に蜂)	Eiji Suganuma	Noboru Takagi	January 24, 2015
Hollywood, conflicted with mixed emotions about her monstrous crimes, is revealed to be dressed as a zombie. After Hollywood was launched by Shizuo, Hollywood saw her past admiration for cinematic monsters flashing before her eyes. Kasuka finds her on the side of the road and drives her to his home, requesting a house call from Shinra. Hollywood is shown to be Ruri Hijiribe, a famous pop idol and makeup artist. As Shinra leaves, Kasuka questions Ruri if she is Hollywood. However, Ruri pounces on Kasuka and attempts to kill him, yet Kasuka shows no reaction. Meanwhile, Shinra goes to Russia Sushi to treat the wounds of Egor. Since Egor cannot pay the fee of 200,000 yen for his treatment, Mairu and Kururi offer to cover the expense using Celty's paycheck. Shinra contact Shingen, who says that he hired Egor to assassinate a serial killer, to which Shinra already realizes her to be Ruri. Kasuka tells Ruri that he became an actor to express human emotions through his characters, in which Ruri realizes that Kasuka is a monster who wants to become human. She tearfully apologizes to him and thanks him for saving her. Shinra leaves Russia Sushi and evades reporters interrogating about Kasuka and Ruri kissing each other. After Shinra was trapped in the shadow cocoon, Haruya Shiki enters his apartment holding a newspaper article concerning a love scandal between Kasuka and Ruri. In the city streets, Kyohei Kadota is annoyed by Walker and Erika having a discussion about moe. Mairu and Kururi are harassed by the biker gang named Toramaru, and Kyohei arrives to intervene. Kyohei calls Saburo Togusa to pick up the group and the twins. Celty takes Ruri to an apartment and removes her helmet to prove that she is headless. Ruri is then seen lying in bed and twirling a barbell as she laughs with joy.
28	4	"When in Rome, Do as the Romans Do"; Transliteration: "Hito no Odoru Toki wa Odore" (Japanese: 人の踊るときは踊れ)	Eiji Suganuma; Yorihisa Koyata	Noboru Takagi	January 31, 2015
Whilst being chased by Toramaru, Celty notices an arm hanging from the duffel bag that she is transporting, causing her to worry that a corpse is inside. This chase is also broadcast live on television. Members of the gang named Yellow Scarves, who are after the reward of ten million yen for the whereabouts of Celty, harass Mikado, Anri and Aoba, only to be interrupted by the timely arrival of the Oriharu twins and the Van Gang, as they make their escape in their van. Celty, who is revealed to be transporting the duffel bag referred to her by Izaya, continues to be chased by Toramaru, until she calmly notices Kyohei's van. After Celty communicates with Kyohei about being chased, Kyohei informs her that his gang stirred up the same situation. While the Van Gang are advised to escape, Celty comes up with a plan to hold her ground against Toramaru in a tunnel. However, Celty is surprised when Egor emerges out the duffel bag under Saika's control while Ruri appears in her dullahan costume after seeing the chase on television. Egor and Ruri hold off Toramaru, allowing Celty to take off. Afterwards, Ruri is now under contract at talent agency Jack O'Lantern with Kasuka, because her old talent agency, Yodogiri Shining Corporation, closed down due to the disappearance of their CEO, Jinnai Yodogiri. It turns out that Mairu and Kururi were on a mission to personally meet Celty after learning that the paycheck belonged to her. As a favor for the payment of Egor's treatment, Denis, the chef and owner of Russia Sushi, came up with the idea to put Egor in a duffel bag to be transported for 800,000 yen. Shinra arrives at his apartment learning that Celty has an ambition for cooking, but since Mika Harima says that her fish would take overnight to prepare, Shinra suggests having a hot pot party at their apartment. In the online chat room, Izaya notices the others talking about the hot pot party, concerned that he was not invited, yet observing this as a way to enjoy his day off. Aoba tells his devious friends that they need to get rid of Izaya, but to keep Mairu and Kururi alive.
28.5	4.5	"My Heart is Like a Hot Pot"; Transliteration: "Watashi no Kokoro wa Nabe Moyou" (Japanese: 私の心は鍋模様)	Takahiro Ōmori	Noboru Takagi	May 30, 2015 (theater); July 22, 2015 (BD/DVD)
At the hot pot party in Shinra and Celty's apartment, Mikado recalls his childhood with Masaomi Kida. One time, they sneaked out late at night to catch rhinoceros beetles. Masaomi was determined to catch one after a run-in with three bullies. Anri then recalls when she first befriended Mika during grade school. She was bullied by her female classmates, who thought that she was cheating on a test, until Mika came to rescue to her. During junior high school, Mika stood up against the bullying female classmates in order to protect Anri. Shizuo also recalls when he first met Tom during junior high school. Tom first suggested to Shizuo to let out his anger despite hating violence, as well as dye his brunette hair blond. After Shizuo later overheard some delinquent male classmates planning to beat up Tom, he took the initiative to beat them up and save Tom. Shizuo then dyed his hair blond and had a peaceful life until meeting Izaya. Kyouhei recalls when he met the rest of the members of the Van Gang, but Walker and Erika begin describing a butler and maid role-playing scenario. Shinra recalls when he discovered his love for Celty ten years ago during an attempted kidnapping, though Celty tries to play it off. Meanwhile, Namie Yagiri leaves abruptly after giving Izaya his own hot pot in his workplace.
29	5	"No One Knows What the Future Holds"; Transliteration: "Issun Saki wa Yami" (Japanese: 一寸先は闇)	Mitsuhiro Yoneda	Toshizō Nemoto	February 7, 2015
Namie watches a video recording on her tablet computer of Izaya, who explains that the human soul cannot be completely controlled, but rather slightly pushed. However, Namie sees this as meaningless, and nothing else matters in the world other than the love for her younger brother Seiji Yagiri. On Saturday, Chikage Rokujo, leader of Toramaru, walks outside an arcade after winning a plushie cat from a claw crane for some girls and stops a shoplifter from running away by kicking him in the face. In the restaurant Lottaria, Tom tells Shizuo that he notices Chikage outside, which Shizuo remembers their encounter the night before. On the previous night, Chikage picked a fight with Shizuo, who previously attacked some other members of Toramaru for tearing his shirt following their defeat in the tunnel. Shizuo easily knocked out Chikage before bringing him to Shinra in order to patch up his wounds. In the online chat room, Mikado opens up a private chat with Masaomi, who warns him not to wander around at night during the weekend and that the Dollars may be in danger. In the present, Shizuo notices Akane Awakusu happily peeking from outside the window of the Lottaria. When he goes outside, she uses a stun gun on him. However, he remains unfazed and takes the stun gun away from her, causing a scene around them. As the police chase after them, Akane clings onto Shizuo, who suggests to Tom that they hide out at Shinra's apartment. Chikage tells the members of Toramaru that he plans to revolt against the Dollars. Meanwhile, Celty takes up a job for Shiki to find Akane. While on the road, Russian assassin Vorona causes Shooter to skid out of control, and Celty's helmet suddenly detaches from her body.
30	6	"A Crow in the Dark Night"; Transliteration: "Yamiyo ni Karasu" (Japanese: 闇夜に烏)	Fumio Maezono	Aya Yoshinaga	February 14, 2015
Celty lies on the side of the road, while Vorona departs in disappointment. Meanwhile, Shizuo, Tom and Akane visit Shinra, who is waiting for Celty to return from her recent job. When Celty first accepted her job from Shiki to find Akane, Yodogiri hires Vorona and Russian assassin Slon at the karaoke bar to kidnap Akane. After picking on Shizuo for his strength, Shinra realizes that Akane has a fever. After school, Aoba tries to make plans with Mikado and Anri to meet the next day, but Mikado has his mind on Masaomi's warning. Mikado agrees to go with Anri and Aoba with the condition that they meet during the day. It is shown that Vorona used a wire attached to her belt and wrapped around a road sign while driving in order to detach Celty's helmet from her body. However, Celty emits a shadow trail on the back of Vorona's motorcycle. Slon has his truck ready for Vorona to park her motorcycle, as she believes that her encounter with Celty was almost too easy. In the online chat room, Mikado learns from Mairu that the Dollars were picking a fight with Toramaru in Saitama. Shinra puts Akane to sleep in the guest bedroom and tells Shizuo that she has an inflamed pharynx. Izaya calls Mikado, wondering why the latter wants to stop the Dollars from picking fights with other prefectures.
31	7	"Moscow Does Not Believe in Tears"; Transliteration: "Mosukuwa wa Namida o Shinjinai" (Japanese: モスクワは涙を信じない)	Mitsuhiro Yoneda	Sadayuki Murai	February 21, 2015
Simon Brezhnev philosophizes that there are two Ivans among Russian men, one who is married to his job and one who has a screw loose in his head. As they attack the location of a group who took some of their weapons, Russian arms dealers Lingerin Douglanikov and Drakon discuss about Vorona and Slon, who once ran away from their mission. They both agree that Vorona is immature despite acquiring knowledge from books. Drakon, who is the distant father of Vorona, gave her various books during her childhood, which she learned facts of life and useless trivia to pass the time. When a burglar tried to apprehend Vorona, she applied her knowledge by pushing the burglar in an overflowing bathtub and using a hair dryer in order to shock him to death. Drakon came home later that night and finally embraced her. When Vorona was older, Simon and Denis taught her basic self-defense, leading her to join missions. In the present, Anri's doorbell rings, but it seems that no one is there. As Anri opens the door, Vorona uses a pair of loppers to break the door chain. Izaya tells Mikado that the most important thing for the Dollars is freedom, but points out that Mikado is conscientious about leaving the gang. While Slon is shocked to see Celty approaching his truck, Vorona is scared when Anri wields Saika. Vorona and Slon retreat in the truck while being chased by Celty. As Vorona shoots from an anti-materiel rifle while inside the truck aimed at Celty, the latter uses her wall of shadows to protect her from the blast, ending up blown back near Anri's apartment. Celty, confused as to why Anri was being targeted, offers Anri to stay at her place in the meantime. Simon also philosophizes that there are two Taros among Japanese men, one who is kind yet naive and one who uses such people.
32	8	"The Ladies' Man Has Neither Money Nor Power"; Transliteration: "Irootoko, Kane to Chikara wa Nakarikeri" (Japanese: 色男、金と力はなかりけり)	Osamu Sekita	Aya Yoshinaga	February 28, 2015
On Sunday, Aoba and his friends go to Mikado's apartment to discuss matters with the Dollars. Masaomi realizes that the logs of the online chat room up until yesterday are gone. When Akane wakes up, she tells Shinra that Izaya told her that Shizuo is a hitman who was going to kill her father and grandfather. In fact, the modified stun gun was given to her by Izaya. Keeping his cool, Shizuo assures Akane that it was just a big misunderstanding. However, once Shizuo makes it to Izaya's workplace, he is frustrated to see a notice of relocation on the door, though it was fake sign posted by Namie. Aoba and his friends take Mikado to an abandoned factory, where Vorona and Slon have a vantage point. Aoba says that he and his friends were the members of the Dollars responsible for attacking Toramaru in Saitama, before revealing that they also go by the color gang named the Blue Squares. Chikage discreetly follows Walker, who seems to be blacklisted at an art gallery, and ends up outside a girls' high school. However, Kyohei stands in Chikage's way. As an email is sent to the Dollars that Toramaru is beginning their revolt, Aoba demands Mikado to be the leader of the Blue Squares. Mikado tries not to smile when Aoba says that either war or surrender can be an order. Anri brings Akane to the subway station, as they wait for Mikado and Aoba to begin the tour. Masaomi is concerned why nobody from the online chat room has appeared recently.
33	9	"The Day is Short, and the Way is Long"; Transliteration: "Hi Kurete Michi Tōshi" (Japanese: 日暮れて道遠し)	Noboru Takagi	Natsuko Kondō	March 7, 2015
The members of Toramaru begin their revenge by indiscriminately beating members of the Dollars. Shizuo is being framed for taking out three members of the Awakusu Group, but he evades engaging in combat with the other members when he momentarily becomes surrounded. Impatient with Mikado making a decision, Aoba has his friends shut the doors of the abandoned factory. Shiki visits Shinra, who says that Shizuo recently came by with a short fuse and had a little girl in tow. Aoba, believing it was Izaya who gave the warning instead of Masaomi, plans to keep Mikado in the abandoned factory while meeting up with Anri. Celty, who was peeping behind a broken window, receives a call from Shinra, thus her cover is blown. Some members of Toramaru come to fight Aoba and his friends, prompting Aoba to defend Mikado and refer to him as the boss. Celty takes Mikado to meet with Anri and Akane, while the Blue Squares take care of Toramaru. Shiki's henchmen find Anri and Akane at the subway station before Mikado and Celty arrive. However, other members of Toramaru arrive as well and start a fight with Shiki's henchmen, allowing Mikado, Celty, Anri and Akane to escape, with Celty turning Shooter into a horse and phaeton. Vorona and Slon continue to follow Celty, proceeding with caution.
34	10	"The Apple Doesn't Fall Far from the Tree"; Transliteration: "Kono Oya nishite Kono Ko Ari" (Japanese: この親にしてこの子あり)	Ho Pyeon-gang	Toshizō Nemoto	March 14, 2015
In the past, Akane first received a cellphone from her parents and grandfather. She believed to have led a carefree life in elementary school until she researched online that her family art gallery business was really a crime syndicate. Unable to face her parents again, Akane confined herself in her bedroom and read an online message board. She met up with Namie and Izaya at a restaurant to explain her current family situation before she decided to run away from home a month later. Izaya also convinced Akane that Shizuo was the most dangerous hitman in the city and may be targeting her family. In the present, Masaomi contacts Izaya, suspecting that his online alias was hacked by Izaya. When Masaomi inquires about Mikado's recent behavior, Izaya suggests for Masaomi to talk to Mikado himself. Chikage demands Kyohei to reveal the leader of the Dollars, but Kyohei says that the leader is irrelevant, comparing this gang to a swarm of locusts or a school of fish. The two agree to a fight outside Raira Academy Field No. 2, where students are playing kabaddi nearby. A female member of the Dollars catches sight of the fight and sends a message to the Dollars. Meanwhile, Izaya sends a message to the Dollars concerning Chikage's girlfriend Non with her female friends in a restaurant. In the abandoned factory, Aoba and the Blue Squares receive the message concerning the whereabouts of Kyohei and Chikage. Aoba discovers Celty's shadow trail on Vorona's tainted bike left behind and decides to follow it to its source. Shizuo runs to the observation deck and receives both messages. Mikado, Celty, Anri and Akane hide out in a parking garage, but Mikado runs off when he receives the messages as well. Vorona follows Mikado, while Slon stays behind. Celty informs Anri that some members of the Dollars plan to kidnap Non and her friends. Anri decides to catch up to Mikado, in which Slon relays this to Vorona, while Slon continues to follow Celty and Akane.
35	11	"No Use Crying over Spilt Milk"; Transliteration: "Fukusui Bon ni Kaerazu" (Japanese: 覆水盆に返らず)	Yūki Arie	Sadayuki Murai	March 21, 2015
In an alleyway, Mikado arrives to save Non and her friends from a group of thugs led by Asanuma, but Mikado is ultimately beaten up by a thug named Hiroshi. Celty and Akane arrive at Shinra's apartment, and Shiki prepares to call Akane's parents. After Akane and Shiki leave, Shinra tells Celty that Shizuo is mistakenly involved due to Izaya. Outside the apartment, Celty and Shinra hear an explosion, and Akane ends up being kidnapped by Slon. Aoba, who was following the shadow trail, sees Slon and Celty drive by. Anri finds Mikado lying in the alleyway. After she defeats Hiroshi, she decides to join Mikado as they head to Raira Academy Field No. 2 together. Kyohei and Chikage engage in a gruesome battle, and the former is the victor. Asanuma and the thugs come to pick a fight against Kyohei and Chikage, even showing that they have Non and her friends as hostages. As Mikado and Anri arrive and take cover behind a bush, Vorona fights Anri, who protects Mikado. Walker and Erika as well as Toramaru also arrive to fight off the thugs. Neko, a member of the Blue Squares, watches from afar and send Aoba photos of Anri wielding Saika.
36	12	"Adversity Makes a Man Wise"; Transliteration: "Kannan Nanji o Tama ni Su" (Japanese: 艱難汝を玉にす)	Yorihisa Koyata	Noboru Takagi	March 28, 2015
Shizuo approaches Mikado while carrying Vorona's motorcycle, saying that he is resigning from the Dollars. He then interrupts the quarrel and wreaks havoc on Asanuma, scaring off the thugs. Vorona attempts to stab Shizuo with her ballistic knife, but that sets him off with no effect on his body, as he hurls her motorcycle at her and chases after her. As she goes back to the truck, he notices that Akane is being held captive inside. He kicks a car repeatedly and uses it as a shield to get closer until he makes it inside the truck. Celty, who has been following behind, prevents Vorona from shooting Shizuo. Slon stops the truck, causing stray knives to descend, but Shizuo shields Akane from being hit. As Vorona and Slon drive off, Shizou jumps out of the truck with Akane in tow. Then, Celty creates a shadow web at an intersection to cushion their fall. Mikado catches up to Chikage and Non, admitting that he is the leader of the Dollars and that he is responsible for the current events. However, Chikage initially does not believe Mikado and advises him to live an ordinary life. Shiki is glad that Akane has returned to her father Mikiya Awakusu, who was responsible for framing Shizuo for the murders of the members of the Awakusu Group, who were actually spies. Mizuki Akabayashi and Shu Aozaki shoot Slon in the kneecaps and tranquilize Vorona during an ambush. It is revealed that Egor is business partners with the Awakusu Group. Mikado agrees to be the leader of the Blue Squares, but first stabs Aoba in his right hand on a piece of paper to form a contract. In the city streets, Izaya receives a mysterious phone call from a hidden number, in which the caller tells him that he stands out too much and asks him to take a nap. Unbeknownst to Izaya, the caller walks up behind him and bumps into him, stabbing him in the stomach in the process. As Izaya loses consciousness, it is revealed that the caller and culprit was Yodogiri.
Ten (Second cour)
37	13	"Love Thy Enemy"; Transliteration: "Nanji no Teki o Aiseyo" (Japanese: 汝の敵を愛せよ)	Shinya Kawatsura	Sadayuki Murai	July 4, 2015
Izaya Orihara wakes up in the hospital in the morning. He remembers receiving a call and being unknowingly stabbed by Jinnai Yodogiri near a shopping arcade in the city streets during the previous night. The incident is reported on the news, though the culprit remains at large. It is revealed that Izaya planted fake rumors about Shizuo Heiwajima. While enjoying his day off on his getaway trip in the countryside with Celty Sturluson, Shinra Kishitani receives a call from Izaya. However, Shinra hangs up on Izaya, who then uses a ploy to get the cops to call Shinra back. While Walker Yumasaki and Erika Karisawa compare fans of yuri and BL, Kyohei Kadota and Saburo Togusa discuss how crazy the world has been since the past year. In a car, Seitarō Yagiri, the uncle of Namie Yagiri and Seiji Yagiri, is warned by Shingen Kishitani to stay away from Yodogiri before being dropped off. Egor, who is chauffeuring, is told by Shingen that Yodogiri is an information broker and used his former talent agency as a front. At the hospital, Izaya is visited by student Manami Mamiya, who seeks revenge on him for deceiving her a year ago at a karaoke bar for an online suicide pact. Manami tries to kill Izaya, but Izaya overpowers her, before exclaiming that humans are magnificent. When Celty and Shinra return to their apartment, they encounter Aoba Kuronuma, who has a bandaged right hand and claims that he wants to be friends with them.
37.5	13.5	"Romanticist's Chaka-Poko"; Transliteration: "Onoroke Chakapoko" (Japanese: お惚気チャカポコ)	Takahiro Ōmori	Noboru Takagi	November 14, 2015 (theater); January 27, 2016 (BD/DVD)
Shinra and Celty are enjoying their getaway trip, with Shooter turned into a horse and coach. Celty changes from a dress to a schoolgirl uniform, which pleasures Shinra. Namie suddenly calls Shinra for an emergency operation to undo plastic surgery for Mika Harima, but Shinra states that he is out of town. After hanging up on Namie, Shinra devises a cover-up story for Celty, saying that Namie was throwing a hot pot party at Yagiri Pharmaceuticals Warehouse Three and was inviting Mika as well. In truth, Shinra was trying to keep Celty away from Namie and Celty's head. Meanwhile, two actors in werewolf costumes are on standby in a log cabin. One of them named Hirayama walks outside to get a signal and calls Miki, an actress dressed as a vampire priestess at a shrine set, in order to get in contact with the assistant director. Celty stops Shooter and restrains Shinra inside the coach, as she looks in the woods after sensing something mysterious. Later, as they continue their getaway trip, Shinra receives a call from Shizuo, who thanks Shinra for the day before. Shinra mentions to Celty about a coming-of-age ceremony hosted by martial arts instructor Traugott Giessendörfer, who made an analogy using a vending machine. While Celty punishes Shinra, who deleted a recording from the television in the apartment, the latter receives an unexpected call from Miki. Celty changes from a suit of armor to a dress for Shinra to take a picture, only for Shinra to receive an unwanted call from Izaya, who is in the hospital. After hanging up on Izaya, Shinra reveals to Celty that Izaya hates dogs. Shinra and Celty are momentarily chased by a real wolf, and they rest by the riverside. Hirayama dons his werewolf costume and scares away Shinra and Celty, while Shinra receives a call from Seiji and instructs him to go to the warehouse. Shinra and Celty decide to check out the shrine set on their way back.
38	14	"Life is but a Dream"; Transliteration: "Kantan no Yume" (Japanese: 邯鄲の夢)	Yūshi Ibe	Noboru Takagi	July 11, 2015
Namie remains indifferent when she heard the news that Izaya was in the hospital. She pays 300,000 yen to Mairu Orihara and Kururi Orihara, who inform her that Seiji was with Mika Harima at the metropolitan theater. Namie becomes irate upon learning that Seiji calls Mika by her first name, which is something that Seiji has never done to Namie. Meanwhile, Seiji and Mika leave the metropolitan theater and soon run into Mikado Ryūgamine, who has a bruised face claiming to be from a trip down the stairs. Seiji and Mika go to Russia Sushi to eat crab sushi, but their date is interrupted when Mika receives a call from Namie. Mika lies to Seiji by saying that Anri Sonohara needs her advice. Namie tells Mika to meet her alone at Yagiri Pharmaceuticals Warehouse Three to discuss matters involving Celty's recovered head. Once Mika arrives at the warehouse, she taunts Namie by referring to her as her sister. Namie throws a pair of surgical scissors at Mika, but Mika blocks it with a spade. After learning that Mika plans to use the spade to eat Celty's head, Namie attacks Mika with a bone saw. A flashback reveals that Namie called Shinra earlier to book an emergency operation at the warehouse in order to undo Mika's plastic surgery, but this was during his getaway trip. In the present, Mika gets the upper hand, but Namie paralyzes Mika with a syringe injection, threatening Mika with a vial of acid to her face. Mika reveals the real names of the online chat room users and many significant secrets about what has been recently happening in the city, digging up all the dirt about everyone that Seiji knows because she does not want him getting into anything dangerous. Soon after, Seiji arrives to stop a surprised Namie from opening the vial. He reveals that he ran into Anri, who has not seen Mika all day, before calling Mika, who would not answer her phone. Seiji called Shinra, who told him to go to the warehouse. Seiji then seemingly kisses Namie, causing her to run away in embarrassment. Before Seiji carries Mika on his back to leave the warehouse, Mika tells Seiji that Izaya no longer stores Celty's head in any of his three apartments. Later, Seiji mentions to Mika that he put two fingers over his lips when he leaned in to kiss Namie.
39	15	"Marriages are Made in Heaven"; Transliteration: "En wa Inamono, Ajinamono" (Japanese: 縁は異なもの, 味なもの)	Toshikatsu Tokoro	Katsumi Terasaki	July 18, 2015
In the restroom of a bar, Mizuki Akabayashi cracks down on three male drug dealers from selling drugs to two female customers. Akabayashi visits the bedroom of Akane Awakusu, who asks how she can be strong enough to kill someone. However, Akabayashi later has to tell Mikiya Awakusu that Akane wants to learn self-defense at a dojo called the Rakuei Gym. Mikiya informs Akabayashi that the drug dealers are from Raira University, and that their club logo is called Heaven's Slave, signified by their temporary tattoos. Six years ago, Akabayashi, a member of a crime syndicate at the time, was tasked to beat a business owner senseless. However, Akabayashi was attacked by Sayaka Sonohara under Saika's control. After Sayaka slashed Akabayashi's right eye, he overcame the curse by ripping it out and he confessed his feelings of love to her, despite her being married and having Anri as her daughter. The business owner turned out to be Sayaka's husband and Anri's father. Akabayashi and Sayaka decided to leave on friendly terms. In the present, Akabayashi passes by a closed down shop for sale and comes across Anri, asking her if she knows anything about the Dollars. Their conversation is cut short when Seiji arrives. Akabayashi meets with members of his former crime syndicate in an abandoned warehouse, but more Heaven's Slave members are looking to set him up. A Molotov cocktail is thrown inside to trap the members, causing a brawl between the members of Akabayashi's former syndicate and Heaven's Slave members, destroying the warehouse in the process. As Akabayashi leaves, one of his former cohorts exclaims that he must have been the one who killed their boss after all. Five years ago, the boss of the crime syndicate convinced Anri's father to be hooked on drugs and to take out life insurance in order to pay his debt, which was used to buy the warehouse. Akabayashi allowed the boss to be murdered by a young assassin, whose sister has been in the hospital because of the drugs given to her by the boss. This flashback explains Akabayashi's aversion to drugs and drug dealers, and also reveals that he did not personally kill his own boss but allowed him to be murdered due to his disagreeable actions.
40	16	"A Rumor Only Lasts Seventy-Five Days"; Transliteration: "Hito no Uwasa mo Shichi Juu Go Nichi" (Japanese: 人の噂も七十五日)	Yūki Arie	Toshizō Nemoto	July 25, 2015
Unconfirmed rumors are spread about Shizuo while he assists Tom Tanaka in collecting a debt from a customer who heard the rumors. Meanwhile, Vorona is forced to work with Simon Brezhnev and Denis at Russia Sushi after she was ambushed, and she calls herself weak because she has never met anyone as strong as Shizuo before. As Akabayashi takes Akane to the Rakuei Gym, an earlier conversation in her bedroom revealed that Akane does not trust anyone including herself, but Akabayashi suggested Akane to toughen herself up to protect herself and her family. Mairu and Kururi pass by, and they happen to attend this dojo, taking Akane inside. Shizuo and Tom walk inside Russia Sushi to eat, and Denis offers to put Vorona to work in debt collection with Shizuo and Tom. Vorona ends up being very useful, being able to take out people with debts in a quick and efficient manner. Shizuo, Tom and Vorona take a break at a shrine and come across Mairu, Kururi and Akane. Vorona stays behind with the other girls, as Shizuo and Tom take care of some business. However, the girls are surrounded by kidnappers, who soon retreat after underestimating the strength of the girls. Vorona tells Akane that Shizuo is her prey, but Akane protests that only she is allowed to kill Shizuo because she saw him first. After Shizuo and Tom return, Vorona walks with them, and Shizuo buys Vorona a soft drink as a token of his gratitude.
41	17	"Asleep or Awake"; Transliteration: "Nete mo Samete mo" (Japanese: 寝ても覚めても)	Hisaya Takabayashi	Aya Yoshinaga	August 1, 2015
Anri has noticed a change in the city of Ikebukuro as well as the behavior of Mikado. In the online chat room, the users discuss the rumor that Ruri Hijiribe is being stalked by a member of the Dollars. Also, they mention that the Blue Squares, disguised with blue ski masks patterned as shark heads, are sweeping the city to unsubscribe members of the Dollars who mug bystanders for money. At the Rakuei Gym, the stalker is revealed to be Kisuke Adabashi, who carries a stash of photos of Ruri in his gym bag. After surviving a dangerous mission of transporting a pet snake to the home of a mogul's daughter, Celty comes back to the apartment and jumps into Shinra's arms with relief. Anri shows up and expresses her concern to them regarding Mikado's unusual behavior. Meanwhile, Shizuo is visited by Kasuka Heiwajima, who brought Ruri with him. Shizuo first mistakes that Kasuka and Ruri came by to get married. However, Kasuka says that Ruri is being stalked by a member of the Dollars who is tied with a group that deals information about idols online. Although Shizuo is unable to help them due to resigning from the Dollars, Ruri will be staying at Kasuka's place in the meantime. A flashback reveals that Aoba asked Shinra and Celty for an email address when they returned from their getaway trip. In the present, Anri reveals that Mikado has been hanging around Aoba at school. Shizuo, Kasuka and Ruri show up at Shinra and Celty's apartment. After Aoba reveals to Mikado that Ruri's stalker is a member of the Dollars, Mikado replies that the Dollars do not need those kinds of members. New users later appear in the online chat room.
42	18	"Roses Have Thorns"; Transliteration: "Hana ni Arashi" (Japanese: 花に嵐)	Inuo Inukawa	Aya Yoshinaga	August 8, 2015
In the past, Ruri was born and raised in a little town tucked deeply in the mountains of the Kantō region. After her father and grandfather went bankrupt, her family home burned to the ground mysteriously. Her mother and father both disappeared shortly after, while her grandmother married into the family, though it is unsure if it was from a previous divorce or death. After being infatuated by cinematic monsters during her childhood, Ruri apprenticed as a special makeup effects artist under Tenjin Zakuroya in hopes of getting closer to her grandmother. Her success led her to meet Yodogiri, who offered to turn her into a pop idol. In the present, Yodogiri contacts Kisuke, whose father was killed by Ruri long ago, although Kisuke remains indifferent about this. For previously providing information about Ruri, Yodogiri wants to cash in a favor from Kisuke. Mikado and Kyohei walk together as they discuss about the corruption of freedom within the Dollars. At Shinra and Celty's apartment, since Celty is more knowledgeable about the Dollars, she eventually finds the forum of the Dollars that is dealing information about Ruri. A flashback reveals that Ruri was forced by Yodogiri to attend a party for their sponsors. It is also revealed that Kisuke's father was a sponsor. However, after following his father to one of these parties with intentions of blackmail, Kisuke saw Ruri and fell madly in love with her. In the present, Shizuo, Kasuka and Ruri are escorted outside the apartment, unknowingly being watched by Kisuke from a distance. Seiji and Mika come by Shinra and Celty's apartment to help, and Mika proves her skills as a former stalker by picking a locked door. Kasuka and Ruri meet with Max Sandshelt, who shows Ruri a photo of her surrounded by men wearing opera masks. In the past, Kisuke's father and his men cut Ruri's arm with a scalpel, in which the wound healed instantly. Ruri learned that Yodogiri approached her because the blood of a monster was coursing through her veins. After Yodogiri killed Ruri's father when he resurfaced, it was then that Hollywood was born and bent on revenge. In the present, Anri is left responsible for taking care of Kasuka's cat Yuigadokusonmaru and parts ways with Seiji and Mika. Masaomi Kida, who has been living with his girlfriend Saki Mikajima, returns to Ikebukuro to find Shizuo, who flicks Masaomi on the forehead as closure for getting him shot by the Yellow Scarves before. Shinra is beaten up by Kisuke, who appears as a delivery guy.
43	19	"A Cat Has Nine Lives"; Transliteration: "Neko wo Koroseba Nana Dai Tataru" (Japanese: 猫を殺せば七代祟る)	Ayako Kawano	Toshizō Nemoto	August 15, 2015
Mikado calls Celty and warns her that Shinra is in danger. She goes back to her apartment, finding Shinra badly injured and taking him to the hospital. In the online chat room, Saki opens up a private chat to tell some users that the stalker has more than one alibi after Ruri. Kisuke found out through the forum of the Dollars that Ruri was Hollywood. Earlier, Mikado used his administrator privileges on the website of the Dollars to hack the information regarding anyone acquainted with Ruri. Mikado then sent the Blue Squares after the alibis. While on the way to Russia Sushi, Masaomi, Shizuo, Tom and Vorona are attacked by two alibis, but the Blue Squares arrive to intervene. A confused Masaomi chases after a member of the Blue Squares and accidentally knocks him unconscious, realizing that Mikado sent a text message to the Blue Squares to protect Anri near her apartment without her knowing. Anri accidentally lets Yuigadokusonmaru run outside from her apartment, while she is found and kicked by Kisuke. After Yuigadokusonmaru scurries away, Kisuke goes out and attacks the members of the Blue Squares. Masaomi sneaks in with a counterattack, but Kisuke manages to pin down Masaomi. Mikado, who was fully masked, lights Kisuke on fire, causing Kisuke to run away in anguish. Aoba arrives in a van to pick up Mikado and the Blue Squares. Before leaving, Mikado tells Masaomi to be patient, stay away until he is done and not tell Anri about him. Anri then finds Masaomi and picks up Yuigadokusonmaru. Before running off, Masaomi promises to explain everything later. Elsewhere, Seitarō wants Yodogiri to give him Celty, Anri and Ruri at any price. In the parking garage, Kisuke, with a severely burned back, receives a leaked photo of Ruri surrounded by Kisuke's father and his men wearing opera masks that Max reported to be a computer virus. As Kisuke browses his phone, a man with a half-burned face walks up to him with a large hammer in his hand. Izaya, now discharged from the hospital, is seen back in his apartment typing in the online chat room as two different users, and Namie remarks that he has no friends. Instead, Izaya points out the people around him in the workplace who has joined his alliance, which include the badly-injured Slon, Kisuke unconscious on the ground, the man with the half-burned face from before, Manami Mamiya and other unknown individuals. Izaya holds Celty's head up to the window and suggests a hot pot party to celebrate, as a close-up shot shows that Celty's eyes have started to open up slightly.
44	20	"Mouth of Honey, a Needle in the Heart"; Transliteration: "Kuchi ni Mitsu, Kokoro ni Hari" (Japanese: 口に蜜, 心に針)	Natsuko Kondō	Noboru Takagi	August 22, 2015
Haruya Shiki hires Izaya to go to a gambling ring run by an organization named Amphisbaena, which uses integrated circuit casino chips as collateral for their tournaments. Shiki informs Izaya that Akabayashi recently cracked down on some drug dealers, but Shiki only learned that the supplier is not Amphisbaena. It is later shown that Mimizu, leader of Amphisbaena, has captured Izaya, who is tied to a chair and has a potato sack over his head. Mimizu tries to torture Izaya by pouring water over his head. Earlier that day, as Mairu and Kururi find Izaya near the Rakuei Gym, Izaya is attacked by dojo instructor Eijirō Sharaku, who berates Izaya for possibly violating his sister Mikage Sharaku in the past. However, Mikage kicks Eijirō in his head, telling him that picking fights in the streets would give the dojo a bad reputation. At night, Izaya is guarded by the biker gang Dragon Zombie and meets with Celty to help him transport some information in a laptop. Elsewhere, Hiroto Shijima, second-in-command of Heaven's Slave supplying the drug, learns that the casino chips can record wins and losses electronically, each containing a transmitter and a bug inside. In fact, the goal is for Heaven's Slave to team up with Amphisbaena to expand the business. Celty leaves the laptop unattended, and Heaven's Slave manages to snatch it and evade Shooter in the form of a horse. Thanks to the laptop's GPS device, which tracked the location of the casino chips, Heaven's Slave barges into Amphisbaena's secret location. Mimizu and Hiroto both receive a phone call from an obscure voice, who revealed the respective leaders of Amphisbaena and Heaven's Slave to be Tokage and Kumoi. Izaya cuts himself loose and reveals that he felt like he was not tortured at all. Ran Izumii, who was the caller, and Mikage arrive to beat up their opponents. In the streets, Izaya encounters Haruna Niekawa, who is obeying him because of his promise to take her to see her teacher Takashi Nasujima. Afterwards, Izaya tells Shiki that Amphisbaena has shut down their casinos and disbanded their membership, though Izaya denies knowing from Shiki that Heaven's Slave also split town. Shiki informs Izaya that Akabayashi wants to speak with him. Izaya believes that being an information broker is more so his passion and not just his job.
45	21	"Eloquent and Competent"; Transliteration: "Kuchi Hatcho Te Hatcho" (Japanese: 口八丁手八丁)	Takuma Suzuki	Noboru Takagi	August 29, 2015
Kasane Kujiragi talks to Nakura, who is Izaya's middle school acquaintance. Nakura says that he sold his name to Izaya and received books about folklore in the mail. Celty once again manages to outsmart Kinnosuke Kuzuhara while on the road, and she returns to Shinra, who is recuperating in bed. As Celty begins to change Shinra's bandages, she notices a scar on his lower abdomen, which he received by being stabbed by a knife in the past. Twelve years ago, on the first day at Raishin Middle School, Shinra invited Izaya to start up a biology club together, seeing as two students are required to start one, since Izaya announced that he loved to observe living beings. Izaya first declined the offer but decided to join after giving it a second thought. In the biology room, they discussed if it is possible to fall in love with a zombie. Izaya then began taking bets on baseball games. In the present, Izaya contacts Nakura to confirm that he was listening in on his conversation with Kasane. Izaya reminds Nakura how they secretly founded Amphisbaena and Heaven's Slave when they were in high school. Nakura used the alias Tokage, and Mimizu referred to him as her boss. He then used the alias Kumoi, and Hiroto used him as a scapegoat even after he disappeared. This reminder causes Nakura to have a mental breakdown. In the past, a month later in the biology room, Nakura ran towards Izaya with a knife because the latter refused to cancel a bet on a baseball game. Shinra consequently protected Izaya from being stabbed and ended up with a wound in the lower abdomen. After Nakura runs off in shock, Izaya patches up Shinra's wound with duct tape. Izaya allowed himself to be arrested so Nakura can live a life of regret. In the present, after being told to let the members of Heaven's Slave steal the laptop, Celty meets with Izaya at night to receive her money, and Izaya says that Yodogiri was the one who sent Kisuke to attack Shinra before. Once Celty leaves, she realizes that Izaya was carrying her head in his bag.
46	22	"Blessed are the Foolish"; Transliteration: "Oroka Mono ni Fukuari" (Japanese: 愚か者に福あり)	Yoshiko Mikami	Sadayuki Murai	September 12, 2015
Anri comes across Erika and her friend Azusa Tsutsugawa, who both encourage her to cosplay with them. In Russia Sushi, Masaomi wears a yellow scarf around his neck and approaches Kyohei, Walker and Saburo, urging them to quit the Dollars and join the Yellow Scarves, and claims he wants to destroy them. Hiroto meets with Yodogiri and Kasane to discuss matters about the Dollars in front of his father and grandfather. Meanwhile, a reporter named Shuji Niekawa is looking for Haruna, his missing daughter. He did not file a missing person's report because he still receives texts from her, but he did check her computer to learn about Nasujima as well as the Dollars. Aoba and Ran meet up during the day in the city, where they are revealed to be brothers. It is revealed that Aoba originally founded the Blue Squares but left Ran in charge after Horada began his crimes. Ran claims he wants to meet Mikado in person and pay his respects, since Mikado is the one who started the Dollars. In a playground at night, Akabayashi gives Izaya an assignment to dig up more information on Mikado, suspicious about his relationship with Anri. In a parking lot, Aoba compares the city to a shallow ocean and the Blue Squares to a bunch of sharks, saying that only Mikado will help them thrive deeper into the Dollars. Masaomi tells Kyohei, Walker and Saburo that the Blue Squares are responsible for tossing out the bad apples in the Dollars but does not answer if Mikado has something to do with this. As Kyohei leaves Russia Sushi to think it over for a few days, he soon becomes the victim of a hit and run, which is then posted in the online chat room. Mikado tells Aoba that it is bad idea to pass by the hospital to visit Kyohei, yet Mikado is somewhat glad that Kyohei is there.
47	23	"Birds of a Feather"; Transliteration: "Onaji Ana no Mujina" (Japanese: 同じ穴の狢)	Daisuke Chiba	Katsumi Terasaki	September 19, 2015
When news of the hit and run finally got to Celty and Shinra, the latter shows concerns for the Dollars, saying that Shizuo is the muscle and Kyohei is the conscience dealing with both external and internal threats. Soon after, Celty receives a message from Aoba, asking if they can meet somewhere and talk. Shuji requests Shiki to help Shuji find Haruna, thinking that the Dollars are responsible for her disappearance. Shiki then calls Akabayashi to set up a meeting. At a bar, Izaya and Akabayashi confirm that Mikado is the leader of the Dollars. In the hospital, Anri and Erika wait in the lobby as Kyohei undergoes surgery. Masaomi reforms the Yellow Scarves, and their mission is to take down Mikado. Saburo drives to a convenience store and encounters former classmates from his high school, telling them that he will kill the one responsible for the hit and run by dragging them behind his van. Walker follows the Yellow Scarves to the karaoke bar, with the stench of kerosene on him, believing it was this gang that was behind the hit and run. In the new hideout of the Blue Squares, Mikado finds out from an online post that Shizuo got arrested, and Aoba begins to wonder if Mikado truly is twisted. With Kyohei and Shizuo out of the picture, Aoba suggests to Mikado that the Dollars need a symbol to represent them. Celty arrives and reluctantly agrees to be the symbol after a previous conversation with Aoba. Akabayashi then arrives on the scene. Earlier that afternoon on a rainy day, Namie encounters Seitarō and Kasane on her way back to her hiding place. Namie is then subdued by Kasane's electric glove while having worried thoughts about Seiji.
48	24	"It Takes a Thief to Catch a Thief"; Transliteration: "Jya no Michi wa Hebi" (Japanese: 蛇の道は蛇)	Tomoko Hiramuki	Noboru Takagi	September 26, 2015
Vorona is overwhelmed with conflicting thoughts as to why Shizuo has been put in jail. While walking in the streets, Vorona encounters Slon in crutches and bandages, now an assistant to Izaya, who has not heard back from Namie. In the hideout of the Blue Squares, Akabayashi personally warns Mikado that he is on the radar of the Awakusu Group. Before Akabayashi leaves, he introduces Shuji, who begs Mikado to help him find Haruna. Walker is followed by Ran, who reveals the scars on his face and arm. Ran attempts to land an attack with his sledgehammer, but Walker retaliates with a flamethrower. After Ran says that Kyohei is now in a comatose state, Walker speculates that Ran is not the culprit because Ran would have wanted Kyohei dead instead. Ran receives a phone call and abruptly leaves. Anri views an urgent online post previously made by Mikado on the website of the Dollars, which details looking for Haruna as a runaway girl. Celty confronts Aoba for his reasons behind wanting to purge the Dollars, especially when she believes that Aoba is using Mikado to fight Masaomi and the Yellow Scarves. While Yodogiri and Kasane are walking in the parking garage, Yodogiri receives a phone call from Izaya, who asks where Namie is. When Yodogiri refuses to comply, a man possessed by Saika drives his car into Yodogiri. Kasane then receives a phone call from Izaya, who concludes that "Jinnai Yodogiri" is a name of a group of men and that "Kasane Kujiragi" is their true leader. Izaya reveals that Kasane sold Saika to Shingen, and taunts Kasane by saying that Saika is now being used against her. Kasane explains that besides slashing humans to create offspring, Saika can make new swords from the pieces if its blade breaks. On the roof, a possessed Slon suddenly appears and ambushes Izaya out of the blue, reporting to Kasane that Izaya has been captured. Kasane is forever grateful to Izaya for killing Yodogiri and declares her freedom.
Ketsu (Third cour)
49	25	"Even a Chance Acquaintance is Decreed by Destiny"; Transliteration: "Sode Suriau mo Tashō no En" (Japanese: 袖すりあうも多生の縁)	Yūki Arie	Toshizō Nemoto	January 9, 2016
Celty Sturluson arrives at her apartment and is surprised to see so many familiar faces. Meanwhile, Shizuo Heiwajima is interrogated by two officers possessed by Saika, who claim that Shizuo assaulted Mimizu. The officers are interrupted by Kinnosuke Kuzuhara, who knows that Shizuo is friends with Celty. Kinnosuke threatens to turn the officers over to internal affairs for foisting a false charge of assault on Shizuo. Elsewhere, Aoba Kuronuma introduces the Blue Squares to Hiroto Shijima. Also, Shu Aozaki tells Ran Izumii that the Dollars seem like a good source of quick money. At the apartment, Shinra Kishitani explains to Celty that Emilia Kishitani ran into Walker Yumasaki, who wanted to use the apartment as a secret base for him and Saburo Togusa. Seiji Yagiri and Mika Harima were looking for a place to crash, while Shingen Kishitani and Egor also came by. In the online chat room, Aoba opens up a private chat with Mairu Orihara and Kururi Orihara, recommending them to leave the city. A flashback reveals that Shingen, Egor and Eijirō Sharaku, who all wore gas masks and lab coats, rescued Namie Yagiri from Seitarō Yagiri and Kasane Kujiragi, using smoke bombs to make their escape. In the present, Celty becomes enraged upon learning from Namie that Izaya has her head and treats it like a ball. Furthermore, Shingen and Walker causes more stress for Celty because she is headless. Meanwhile, Mikage Sharaku and Kine corner and defeat Slon. Izaya Orihara, who was never knocked out during his capture, tells Mikage and Kine that Slon was under the influence of Kasane, a wielder of Saika. As Celty tries to piece together why her guests are visiting, Shinra suggests that they start a guild and pool together all of their resources, with Celty as their leader.
50	26	"Bell the Cat"; Transliteration: "Neko no Kubi ni Suzu" (Japanese: 猫の首に鈴)	Masayuki Kojima	Aya Yoshinaga	January 16, 2016
In the hospital, Anri Sonohara prepares to tell Erika Karisawa her secret, only to be interrupted by Chikage Rokujo, who casually approaches them. Erika tells Chikage that only family members are allowed to see Kyohei Kadota, who will be waking up from his surgery soon. Chikage exchanges numbers with Erika and leaves. Izaya shows up at the hospital just when Anri is about to tell Erika about Saika. Anri suspects Izaya of messing with Mikado Ryūgamine and Masaomi Kida, but Izaya declares that he did nothing, all for the love of observing human beings. As Izaya strongly believes Anri of being inhuman when she agreed to be one with Saika, Erika slaps Izaya with a paper plane, telling him to stop trying to make Anri cry. When Izaya leaves for a cranial nerve examination, Erika consoles Anri. Meanwhile, an exhausted Celty informs Shinra about the difficulty of sleeping arrangements for her houseguests. Shinra is concerned because Celty acts more human than most people, which is why she is so kind. It is revealed that Kasane and the mother of Ruri Hijiribe are half-sisters, with Kasane being considerably younger. Ruri's grandmother took in Kasane after she was born and sold her to Jinnai Yodogiri, who trained Kasane from a young age to run his business, forcing her to prey on humans and monsters alike. After Yodogiri died, Kasane continued to run the business by using stand-ins for him, because running the business was all she knew in the world. Kasane became jealous upon discovering that her niece Ruri was freely pursuing her dreams. Seitarō calls Kasane asking about Yodogiri, and Kasane tells him that she will be taking care of their contract. Kasane is seen enjoying her first day of freedom, buying out all the cat ear headbands at a cosplay store and reading a magazine under a tree at a park. Anri also goes to the cosplay store, discontent that the cat ear headbands were sold out earlier. However, she runs into Haruna Niekawa, another wielder of Saika. In the online chat room, Kururi tells Celty to watch the live broadcast on television, which shows that a woman's head was found in the bushes in front of the police station. Earlier the same day, Manami Mamiya, still bent on getting revenge on Izaya, went to see Haruna at her apartment. Haruna, who was ordered by Izaya to guard Celty's head, was persuaded by Manami to hand it over in order to get back her freedom, before they went their separate ways. In the present, Celty faints after news of her head is reported on the internet.
51	27	"All in the Same Boat"; Transliteration: "Doushuuai Sukuu" (Japanese: 同舟相救う)	Yoshihiro Mori	Sadayuki Murai	January 23, 2016
After watching a viral video of Celty's head being seen in the bushes, Mikado contacts Izaya, who questions Mikado as to why he has not quit the Dollars yet. Izaya advises Mikado to quit the Dollars and lead a normal life, but Mikado declines by saying that Izaya was behind the reason why Masaomi knows about him. Mikado plans to reset the Dollars, but Izaya comments that this would make Mikado nonessential to this gang. Meanwhile, Haruna brings Anri to the park, where Haruna explains that she forgives Anri for slashing her with Saika long ago, channeling her hatred into love. Since Haruna is obsessed with looking for her teacher Takashi Nasujima, she asks Anri to join forces with her. Haruna learned that Anri has a relationship with Mikado and Masaomi, which Haruna knew all about because she used to work with Izaya. Noticing that Anri is trying to contain Saika within her, Haruna offers to take Saika for herself. As Anri declines the offer, Haruna now has the reason to fight. Izaya is amazed by Mikado's unpredictability when the latter admits to his nonessential qualities. Mikado analogizes that he wants to sit in a boat at the water's edge, more or less controlling people's happiness and misery from the front row. Izaya turns down Mikado's proposal to join his side, but Mikado tells Izaya to check the news before hanging up the call. After blocking one attack from Haruna, Anri realizes that she called herself a parasite, neither a human nor a monster. Kasane, who overheard Anri and Haruna, requests them to take their fight somewhere else since they disturbed the cats in the park. Revealing herself as the original Saika, Kasane restrains and shocks Haruna. Kasane notices that Anri does not want her Saika and offers to buy Saika from Anri at any price, explaining that she has a contract to procure her Saika for a client of hers. After Haruna believes Kasane to be a thieving cat, Kasane agrees for the three of them to discuss matters further in a cafe. Hiroto meets with a disguised Nasujima, who suggests that they work together to obtain Yodogiri's fortune. Nasujima not only shows photo evidence of being in the passenger seat of the hit and run, but also reveals that he told the driver to hit Kyohei. Chikage approaches Masaomi and the Yellow Scarves on a rooftop parking lot, with the ultimatum of being taken over or taken out.
52	28	"Blood is Thicker Than Water"; Transliteration: "Chi wa Mizu yori mo Koshi" (Japanese: 血は水よりも濃し)	Takashi Kobayashi	Katsumi Terasaki	January 30, 2016
Chikage plans to use the Yellow Scarves to smoke out the members of the Dollars who attacked Toramaru in Saitama. To settle the confusion, Chikage challenges Masaomi to a fight, promising to be Masaomi's bodyguard if he loses. In the cafe, Kasane explains to Anri and Haruna about how replication works with Saika. Haruna points out that Anri could control the ones whom she loves by cutting them with Saika, but Kasane says that it is possible to cut them but not control them. Kasane also says that the wielder of Saika should be thought of as a virtue instead of a curse, leading Anri to question her humanity. After Kasane calmly identifies herself as a villain, she clarifies that Anri's relationship with Saika is symbiotic and not parasitic. Anri withdraws from giving up her Saika because how it has saved her life up until now. Kasane gives Anri her business card in order to contact her later. As Erika arrives at the cafe, she is stoked that Kasane collects cat ear headbands. Kasane and Haruna go their separate ways, while Erika tells Anri that Kyohei has woken up from his comatose state. Masaomi tries to trap Chikage in a chokehold, but Chikage runs and then jumps off the rooftop parking lot. Masaomi grabs onto a pole just before the jump, but he encounters Ran Izumii, who arrives with his crew. Ran blurts out that he broke the legs of Saki Mikajima, leading to an intense match between Masaomi and Ran, one where both of them bleed. Shizuo is released from jail with his charges dropped after his cellmate, who was under the influence of Saika, told him that the police station is surrounded by reporters and that Celty's head has been brought to the police station for safekeeping. Vorona explodes a squad car at the police station, takes Celty's head secured in a briefcase and escapes in her motorcycle. Although Shuji Niekawa finally finds Haruna, she uses Saika to brainwash him, but it backfires as he sedates her with a syringe injection and takes her to Nasujima, who is lust-driven for Haruna. Nasujima reveals that when two of Saika's children slash the same person, control of said person is given to the child who slashed them last. Meanwhile, after Celty wakes up, Shinra reveals that Seiji was shot with sedatives by Shingen, then Namie was shot with sedatives by Shinra. Kasane unexpectedly shows up at the apartment and introduces herself to Shinra and Celty.
53	29	"Lost in the Dark"; Transliteration: "Yami ni Madou" (Japanese: 闇に惑う)	Yorihisa Koyata	Toshizō Nemoto	February 6, 2016
Kasane kisses Shinra and cuts him with Saika, which she uses to slice through a window. She jumps out and carries him, fleeing by extending several blades like wires to swing from buildings. Celty goes berserk and follows them in a large mass of shadows throughout the city. Shizuo is pestered by kids, but he scares them away by damaging one of their bicycles. Earlier during the battle between Masaomi and Ran, the former injured the latter's right leg and hand. Masaomi realized that Ran was a member of the Dollars and was sent by Mikado. Chikage returned to the rooftop parking lot to pull the emergency fire alarm and kicked Ran to the curb, taking Masaomi with him to jump off and landing safely onto a truck. In the present, Vorona has conflicting feelings for her purpose in life ever since she has gotten to know and respect Shizuo. When Vorona and Kasane meet up, Kasane has Vorona drive both Shinra and Celty's head in a car. As Kasane realizes that Celty is chasing after Vorona, Kasane uses Saika in the form of several blades that create a net in order to stop Celty. Vorona gradually comes to the conclusion that she is lonely without Shizuo. Meanwhile, Shooter, in the form of a horse, breaks out of the apartment and finds Shizuo, transforming into a bicycle to take him to Celty. Also, Saki finds Anri outside her apartment and formally greets her.
54	30	"In For a Penny, In For a Pound"; Transliteration: "Norikakatta Fune" (Japanese: 乗りかかった舟)	Yoshihiro Yanagiya	Aya Yoshinaga	February 13, 2016
Izaya tells Mikage and Kine that Mikado is fragile yet dangerous. At Anri's apartment, Saki asks Anri if she has romantic feelings towards Masaomi or Mikado, but Anri sees them as guardian angels for saving her life in the past. Saki admits to being a puppet of Izaya, who ordered her to date Masaomi, but she ended up genuinely falling in love with Masaomi. Meanwhile, Chikage tells Masaomi that he and Mikado are both trying to cover up the fact that they are weak for different reasons. At the hideoout of the Blue Squares, Mikado tells Aoba that he worries that Celty might leave the city if she got her head back. Chikage takes the initiative to call Mikado for Masaomi, seeing as nothing is getting done. Ran is shown with an injured left arm, finally meeting Mikado alone. Although Ran talks tough, Mikado says that he relies on numbers and is in the process of purging the Dollars. Ran gives Mikado an unknown object as a gift before hitching a ride with Aozaki, who is surprised that Mikado took the object without hesitation. Also, Mizuki Akabayashi is notified by one of his henchmen that Ran hitched a ride in Aozaki's car, and Akabayashi tells him to continue watching Mikado. In the online chat room, Namie is looking for Mikado and plans to expose him. Mikado receives Chikage's call, but he decides to screen the call instead.
55	31	"No Love Lost"; Transliteration: "Ken'en mo Tatanarazu" (Japanese: 犬猿もたたならず)	Masayuki Iimura	Sadayuki Murai	February 20, 2016
In the online chat room, Namie gives out personal information about the other users, wanting Mikado to take responsibility for his actions. Erika calls Saburo to tell him that Kyohei sneaked out of the hospital, possibly to find the culprit of the hit and run. Anri and Saki decide to head to Shinra and Celty's apartment. At an old warehouse, Seitarō meets with Kasane, who has Celty's shadow constrained with Saika in the form of wires created by its blades. Kasane's plan is to reunite Celty's head and body together, then sever the head again to claim the body. Since Celty's head contains memories of her previous life, it is believed that Celty will forget her life as the Headless Rider when her head is restored. Shizuo, who manages to ride into the street blocked off by people possessed by Saika, confronts Kasane for treating Celty like a monster to sell like merchandise. Vorona arrives and aims a gun at Shizuo to express her seriousness in her current mission, but Shizuo mentions that she is his trainee. As Seitarō orders Vorona to shoot Shizuo, Kasane tells Vorona that she is not obligated to do so and suggests that they should leave instead. Leaving Seitarō with Celty's head, Kasane tells Seitarō that she will bring Celty's body and Saika to him on another day because she does not want to die. Izaya suddenly drops steel beams from above using a crane. Vorona pushes Shizuo out of the way at the cost of injuring her left leg. When Izaya pushes an excavator off the roof of the warehouse, Shizuo lifts it off and destroys it. Izaya calls Shizuo as they say farewell to each other.
55.5	31.5	"Dufufufu!!"; Transliteration: "Dufufufu!!" (Japanese: デュフフフ!!)	Takahiro Ōmori	Noboru Takagi	May 21, 2016 (theater); July 27, 2016 (BD/DVD)
A bartender named Shizuo Nobusuma is mistaken by two thugs to be Shizuo Heiwajima for having the same first name despite his chubby appearance. After Nobusuma did research on Shizuo, Nobusuma arrives in Ikebukuro and pretends to be Shizuo. Nobusuma first encounters Celty in the streets and demands money from her. After she easily gives him money, she goes to Shinra back at the apartment to let him know that there is someone posing as Shizuo. Soon after, Nobusuma passes by four members of the Dollars, in which one of them willingly gives up his soda to Nobusuma. It is revealed that a message was sent to the Dollars regarding the "fake Shizuo". Nobusuma then comes across Simon Brezhnev outside Russia Sushi, where Nobusuma lies about having gained weight. Simon forces Nobusuma to eat a big meal inside, while Denis prevents a dine and dash situation. Afterwards, Nobusuma tries to mug Tom Tanaka and Vorona during one of their debt collections, but Vorona knocks out Nobusuma before she takes her leave with Tom. When Nobusuma regains consciousness, he wanders around and crosses paths with Izaya, who calls himself Tsukumoya. Meeting in the Lottaria, Izaya tries to pick Nobusuma's brain to see whether or not he truly is the real Shizuo, bringing up questions about the Dollars and the Headless Rider to throw him off. Outside the Lottaria, Izaya maces a gang leader, tricking Nobusuma into attacking him. After running away, Nobusuma unknowingly meets Shizuo, who was dropped off by Kasuka Heiwajima after attending the funeral of their grandmother. An enraged Shizuo sends Nobusuma flying after the latter repeatedly kicks Kasuka's car. Izaya tells Namie that the gang leader was posing as a member of the Awakusu Group and was selling counterfeit art at a gallery. Several days later, the Van Gang is approached by Nobusuma, who impersonates Kyohei. However, the Van Gang captures and tortures Nobusuma. Later on, Nobusuma impersonates Celty right in front of her. Nonetheless, she apprehends him and demands that he returns the money that she gave him before.
56	32	"A Tiger Dies and Leaves His Skin"; Transliteration: "Tora wa Shi shite Kawa no Nokosu" (Japanese: 虎は死してを皮を残す)	Tomoko Hiramuki	Noboru Takagi	February 27, 2016
Mikage stops Kasane and a limping Vorona from pursuing after Shizuo, who is preparing for his final showdown against Izaya. Shingen unlocks the briefcase, taking out Celty's head from it, much to Seitarō's worry. Egor hurls Celty's head into her shadows. This turns her back into a knight with her head in tow, but having no memories of being the Headless Rider, which is first witnessed by Izaya. Kyohei arrives at Shinra and Celty's apartment and receives medicine from Emilia. He then tells Walker and Saburo that he saw tons of people possessed by Saika roaming the streets before his accident. In Russia Sushi, Simon, Denis, Tom and Kine are trapped inside while a horde of people possessed by Saika surrounds them. Simon saves Tom from being attacked by a Saika zombie. It is revealed that Nasujima, Haruna and Hiroto, who are watching outside, are working together to create a Saika Army. In fact, Nasujima wants to "recruit" Tom in the army in order to use him against Shizuo. During high school, Izaya was dismayed when Shinra first introduced him to Shizuo, seeing him as a monster instead of a human. In the present, Izaya sets fire to the top floor of the warehouse when Shizuo enters inside. Denis and Kine help Tom barricade Russia Sushi, while Simon provides various firearms for protection. In the online chat room, Chikage interrupts a ranting Namie and tells Mikado to answer his phone instead of screening the call, threatening to harm Masaomi. Mikado calls Chikage, who wants revenge on the Dollars for attacking Toramaru. Chikage kicks Masaomi's injured left leg, causing Masaomi to scream, before informing Mikado to meet downtown. After Chikage hangs up, Mikado tells Aoba that downtown is where it all began, when neither Anri nor Masaomi were not there when the Dollars had their first meeting. Meanwhile, Erika hides from the Saika Army surrounding Russia Sushi.
57	33	"Walking on Thin Ice"; Transliteration: "Hakuhyō wo Fumu" (Japanese: 薄氷を踏む)	Hisaya Takabayashi	Noboru Takagi	March 5, 2016
Anri and Saki arrive at Shinra and Celty's apartment, where Seiji, Mika, Namie, Kyohei, Walker and Saburo are planning to save Erika after she messaged Walker that she is in trouble. Mikage continues to hold off both Vorona and Kasane, while Izaya stands safely at a distance as he pumps carbon dioxide in the filter system to suffocate Shizuo. Izaya lights a match to cause the warehouse to go up in flames, but the Celty's shadows engulf the explosion. In the online chat room, Chikage tells Mairu and Kururi that people in real life are no different than people online. During high school, Shizuo was upset that Shinra introduced him to Izaya, but Shinra mentioned that he would give up anything for the woman whom he loved. In the present, Shizuo breaks a steel beam that Izaya is standing on and bats him out of the area. Masaomi and Chikage go on the roof of Tokyu Hands, the downtown chain department store, as they try to figure out why a bunch of people are crowding around Russia Sushi at night. As the two see the Blue Squares from a distance, Chikage plans to go down there and take off their masks while Masaomi tells him which one is Mikado. Meanwhile, Manami unintentionally finds an injured Shinra at another apartment previously owned by Yodogiri. As Manami walks Shinra and hails a taxi, she asks him what Izaya hates more than anything else. Shinra compares Izaya to a windsock, in which accepting humanity is like emotional protection for Izaya. The things that Izaya hates the most are the ones that cause him pain, like a bad cut or having his heart broken.
58	34	"Telepathy"; Transliteration: "Ishin Denshin" (Japanese: 以心伝心)	Takahiro Majima	Noboru Takagi	March 12, 2016
Anri explains to Kyohei, Walker, Saburo, Seiji, Mika and Namie that someone is controlling the citizens using Saika, then unveils her secret sword concealed in her body. Izaya wakes up, realizing that Shizuo that hit him into an office building adjacent to the warehouse. Shizuo chases a limping Izaya, who both pass by Shingen and Egor on their way out. Assuming Erika is infected, Anri could use her Saika can negate the hypnotic effect. Anri is surprised when Kyohei comments that no one is afraid of her despite her thoughts of being a monster, since Celty appears less of a human to others but shows to be very human nonetheless. Erika puts on red tinted contact lenses to blend in with the Saika Army, overhearing Nasujima and Hiroto talking about targeting Kasane. While Nasujima and Hiroto scout out the Blue Squares, Anri calls Haruna, only for Nasujima to answer the call instead. Nasujima tells Anri that he is at Tokyu Hands, instilling worry on her upon mentioning that Mikado and Masaomi will arrive soon. As Nasujima tells Hiroto to look for the member of the Blue Squares whose cellphone will ring, Anri prepares to call Mikado. Chikage picks a fight with the Blue Squares on the streets, while Masaomi sees Mikado after hearing his cellphone ring from the roof of Tokyu Hands. Outside Shinra's apartment, Manami learns that Shinra vows to be with the woman whom he loves, even if she lost her memories. Mikado admits to knowing that Masaomi was safe all along after having tracked him down through the information network of the Dollars. After admitting to being the one who started up the Dollars, Mikado says that he wants to show Masaomi the last meeting of the Dollars.
59	35	"Life is an Unknown Course"; Transliteration: "Mizu no Nagare to Hito Gyōmatsu" (Japanese: 水の流れと人行末)	Tomoko Hiramuki	Noboru Takagi	March 19, 2016
Thinking that Haruna is possessed, Erika calls Kasane to warn her about Nasujima. Shingen approaches Kasane with the intention of purchasing her Saika, which transformed from wires into a sword. Aoba surprises Chikage with the appearance of biker gangs and thugs from other prefectures as new members of the Dollars. Masaomi is startled when Mikado says that the biker gangs and thugs were brought to Ikebukuro by leaving threats about their families. After Mikado reveals his plans to shut down the Dollars since people are getting hurt, he suddenly points a gun at Masaomi. Anri, Walker and the others find Erika, soon realizing that she is wearing red tinted contact lenses to blend in with the crowd. There is news about shooting incidents involving the Dollars at the police station and the home of Dougen Awakusu, the head of the Awakusu Group. Mikado, responsible for the shootings, wants to end the Dollars in a perfect way, so that this gang will become an urban legend. As Masaomi tries to reason with Mikado, a gunshot is heard. Meanwhile, Shizuo continues to chase Izaya, ending up to where Aoba and Chikage are located in the streets in the middle of the crowd. Elsewhere, Kasane finds Shinra, apologizing for kidnapping him. She notices that his will is strong enough to resist her Saika, and he rejects her sentiment of being loved since he has genuine feelings for Celty. Shinra then asks Kasane for a favor. Although Mikado fired the gun, the bullet only grazes Masaomi's face. Masaomi gets on top of Mikado and punches him, but Mikado retaliates by pulling out a glove pistol, which was given to him by Hiroto, onto Masaomi's left leg. Akabayashi surmises that Aozaki was going to use the shooting incidents as an excuse to get rid of Mikado, and then find someone else to take his place. However, Akabayashi and Aozaki both learn that the bullets used at the shooting incidents were not from the gun that Aozaki gave Mikado. Ran and his crew find Kyohei and the others inside the van, but Ran notices that Walker is not there. Walker appears on top of Saburo's van with a fire extinguisher flamethrower to ward off Ran and his crew in order for Kyohei and the others to escape. After spotting Shizuo, Nasujima orders the Saika Army to infiltrate Russia Sushi in order to find Tom. Seeing Masaomi shot, Mikado realizes that he has the potential to make everyone around him suffer. Deciding that he cannot allow himself to keep going, Mikado puts his glove pistol to his head. Despite Masaomi's pleas, another gunshot is heard.
60	36	"Those Who Meet Must Part"; Transliteration: "Au wa Wakare no Hajime" (Japanese: 会うは別れの始め)	Yorihisa Koyata; Miyuki Ōshiro; Takahiro Omori	Noboru Takagi	March 26, 2016
Shizuo and Izaya continue their fight, while Simon, Denis, Tom and Kine charge out of Russia Sushi using stun grenades to ward off the Saika Army. Vorona stabs Izaya with a ballistic knife and points a gun at him, declaring Shizuo a human. After Denis sees Shizuo, Simon chucks a stun grenade, leaving Vorona temporarily unconscious. At the same time, Nasujima tells Haruna to command the Saika Army to possess the remaining citizens, but Celty says that she will undo all the trouble associated with her body. She uses her shadow webs to restrain the Saika Army, as well as to save the lives of Mikado and Masaomi by removing the bullets shot from the glove pistol. Anri, Saki, Seiji and Mika find Mikado and Masaomi at the roof of Tokyu Hands, where Celty explains that she plans to leave Ikebukuro because her body has influenced the citizens in a negative way. Shinra also arrives, already aware that her memories of the city have not faded away, yet Celty denies of this and rides off with Shooter into the sky. Shizuo finds Shinra and throws him towards Celty, who catches Shinra when he shoots passed her. Shinra unleashes his Saika, previously obtained from Kasane, to sever the link between Celty's head and body. As Celty sees a glimpse of memories of Shinra, she uses her shadow webs to catch his fall and scold him for being an idiot. As Mikado, Masaomi, Anri and Saki are walking in the streets, Nasujima suddenly appears behind them and tries to stab Anri, but Mikado pushes her out of way and gets stabbed instead. Haruna messages Shuji, telling him not to worry and that she is with the man whom she loves. Izaya is being transported in a car with Kine and Manami, in which Manami carried Izaya to the car and they are headed to Kine's underground doctor instead of a local hospital. Celty's head is now located in Chicago by the Nebula Corporation. Shingen tries to offer Namie a job position in the Nebula Corporation, while Seiji and Mika plan to study abroad in Chicago. Seiji is not in love with Mika but can love her like family. Kasane saves Ruri from being hit by a truck driven by Kisuke Adabashi. Due to Kasane's jealousy and opportunity to atone for Ruri's sins as Hollywood, Kasane drops Kisuke off right in front of the police station. Vorona prepares to board a plane to Russia with Slon, not long before she says farewell to Shizuo but promises to return one day. Celty and Shinra share a ride on Shooter in the form of a motorcycle, but they are interrupted by Kinnosuke, ultimately starting another chase. Mikado collapses after being stabbed, prompting Anri to wield Saika and attack Nasujima. Haruna suddenly appears and blocks the attack, as she reveals that she was never under Nasujima's control, causing him to flee in terror. Saburo runs over Nasujima with his van after Erika recognizes Nasujima as the boss of the Saika Army and Kyohei recognizes Nasujima as the driver of the hit and run. Nasujima wakes up chained to a bed in a soundproof room inside one of Izaya's hideouts, where Haruna has various tools to use on him in order to show him her love. Before walking towards Mikado's hospital room, Aoba is stopped by Akabayashi's threats. In the lobby, Anri reveals to Akabayashi that she is in love with Mikado. In the hospital room, Mikado wakes up from his coma, where Masaomi and Anri hold his right hand.
