= Durarara!! season 1 =

Durarara!!
- Season 1
- Cover of the first volume DVD released in Japan, featuring Mikado Ryūgamine, Anri Sonohara, and Masaomi Kida.
- No. of episodes: 24

Release
- Original network: MBS
- Original release: January 8 – June 25, 2010

Series chronology
- Next → Durarara!!×2

Durarara!! is a 2010 anime series directed by Takahiro Omori and produced by Brain's Base. The episodes are adapted from the light novels of the same name, written by Ryōgo Narita and illustrated by Suzuhito Yasuda. The series follows several people in Ikebukuro: Celty Sturluson, a dullahan working as an underground courier while looking for her lost head; an internet-based anonymous gang called the Dollars; and the chaos that unfolds around the most dangerous people in the city. The anime began airing in Japan on January 8, 2010. The series was aired by the MBS television network, followed by the TBS, CBC, and Bandai Channel networks. Crunchyroll simulcasts the anime within 24 hours of its Japanese premiere to its members, becoming a free-for-all a week later. The series was simulcast in French Speaking Europe by Dybex, starting January 14, 2010.

Aniplex released the first limited-edition DVD, containing two episodes, on February 24, 2010, and as of March 24, 2010, two additional DVDs have been released. The seventh DVD, which was released on August 25, 2010, includes a direct-to-DVD episode.

The anime series is licensed in North America by Aniplex of America, while Beez Entertainment holds the license in UK and Germany. Dybex holds the rights in France and Benelux. Aniplex USA released Durarara!! in three digipak, two-disc sets. Part one was released on January 25, 2011, part two was released on March 29, 2011, and part three was released on May 31, 2011. They are sold at RightStuf.com and at Bandai Entertainment's The Store.

The anime was also broadcast in the United States on Cartoon Network's Adult Swim programming block from June 26 to December 18, 2011.

The anime uses four pieces of theme music. For the first twelve episodes, "Uragiri no Yūyake" (裏切りの夕焼け; lit. "Sunset of Betrayal") by Theatre Brook is the opening theme, while "Trust Me" by Yuya Matsushita is the series' ending theme. "Trust Me" and "Uragiri no Yūyake" were released as singles on February 17, 2010, and February 24, 2010, respectively. From episode thirteen onwards, the opening theme became "Complication" (コンプリケイション, Konpurikeishon) by ROOKiEZ is PUNK'D, and the ending theme became "Butterfly" by On/Off.

== Episode list ==
No.	Title	Directed by	Written by	Original release date	English air date
1	"Exit 1 / First Words (Opening)"; Transliteration: "Kaikōichiban" (Japanese: 開口一番)	Shinya Kawatsura	Noboru Takagi	January 8, 2010	June 26, 2011
Mikado Ryūgamine leaves his country home to attend Raira Academy, a high school in Ikebukuro, with his childhood friend Masaomi Kida. Mikado, wandering around the district with Masaomi, meets Kyohei Kadota, Walker Yumasaki, Erika Karisawa, and Saburo Togusa, known as the Van Gang who are four of Masaomi's friends. Three human traffickers named Morita, Asanuma and Kanazawa strategically seize a teenage girl when Morita poses as a man named Nakura. Masaomi tells Mikado never to come to bad terms with sushi chef Simon Brezhnev or bartender Shizuo Heiwajima. As Morita, Asanuma and Kanazawa wait at an exchange point in a parking garage, a helmeted person on a black motorcycle appears and attacks Kanazawa and Morita. Asanuma drives away in his van, but the motorcyclist gives chase. After Asanuma rams the motorcyclist off their motorcycle, he gets out of the van and discovers that the motorcyclist is headless. The motorcyclist then gets up and slashes Asanuma with a conjured scythe, and Asanuma falls to his knees. Masaomi later tells Mikado to stay away from information broker Izaya Orihara as well as an internet gang called the Dollars. Mikado bumps into a redheaded girl, and he notices a scar around her neck. The girl screams and runs away. Mikado and Masaomi then watch the Headless Rider pass by on the road.
2	"Highly Unpredictable"; Transliteration: "Ikkyoichijitsu" (Japanese: 一虚一実)	Makoto Baba	Noboru Takagi	January 15, 2010	July 3, 2011
Mikado and Masaomi begin the school year in different classes. Seiji Yagiri, another student at Raira Academy, arrives late to class and states he would not be attending school anymore. The girl who was kidnapped, Rio Kamichika, is revealed to be in Masaomi's class. In middle school, she discovered that her father had an affair, which is something she confides to an online friend who was experiencing similar problems. The pair decide to meet to enter into a suicide pact. Kamichika meets a man claiming to be her online friend named Nakura, only to be kidnapped and rendered unconscious. A headless woman, revealed as the Headless Rider, rescues her and takes her to a building. Kamichika meets her real online friend atop the roof, revealed to be Izaya, who explains that he had her kidnapped and rescued to see her reaction. Leading her to the edge of the roof, he tells her that many have jumped off there, persuading her to believe she is not a special case. When he leaves, Kamichika jumps off the roof, but is rescued by shadows controlled by the Headless Rider. She explains through her cell phone that the world is not as terrible as Kamichika thinks. Kamichika forgives her parents afterwards. Mikado and Masaomi see Anri Sonohara, a female student in Mikado's class, trying to talk to Seiji. Izaya tells the Headless Rider that saving Kamichika was not part of her job as a courier. He denies being responsible for the ones that had previously jumped, but he states that he will not stop someone who wants to die.
3	"Rampant Evil"; Transliteration: "Chōryōbakko" (Japanese: 跳梁跋扈)	Yui Umemoto	Toshizō Nemoto	January 22, 2010	July 10, 2011
Mikado and Anri become class representatives, though Masaomi jokes around with this. Mikado and Masaomi later meet up with Kyohei, Walker and Erika. Kyohei tells Mikado that the Dollars are too dangerous to approach. Meanwhile, Anri searches for a girl named Mika Harima. She mistakes the redheaded girl for Mika, then apologizes and runs away. Mikado and Masaomi continue to wander around the district. They end up finding Anri being bullied by the Ganguro Girls named Haruko, Youko and Akie as well as a gang member named Hiroshi. As Mikado thinks of a way to rescue Anri, Izaya walks by and pushes Mikado between Anri and the Ganguro Girls. Izaya then scares the bullies away by deliberately breaking Youko's cell phone. Masaomi reluctantly introduces Mikado to Izaya soon afterwards. Izaya tells the two that he came to Ikebukuro to meet someone. Their conversation is interrupted by a flying trash can that hits Izaya. Shizuo appears and attacks Izaya for framing him for a crime. Several gang members led by Hiroshi show up to attack Izaya, but they wind up injured when they try to fight Shizuo. Izaya escapes, and Shizuo throws a vending machine at him. Simon jumps down from the top floor of a nearby building, where he was delivering sushi, and stops the vending machine in order to save Izaya. Mikado and Anri run away, leaving Masaomi behind as Shizuo confronts Simon. Stopping at a park, Anri thanks Mikado and runs off. That night, Shizuo talks to the Headless Rider and asks why Izaya was in Ikebukuro.
4	"Utterly Alone"; Transliteration: "Keieisōchō" (Japanese: 形影相弔)	Kazuhide Kondō	Noboru Takagi	January 29, 2010	July 17, 2011
Shinra Kishitani, an unlicensed underground doctor, is revealed to be living with the Headless Rider, also referred to as the Black Rider, whose real name is Celty Sturluson. In the past, Celty had first realized she was a dullahan when she lost her head at a cemetery atop a hill while riding on her Cóiste Bodhar twenty years ago. She traveled far and wide for the head, ending up in Ikebukuro. Celty learned from Izaya that an old street portrait painter saw a dullahan missing its head. Celty tried to find the portrait painter, but to no avail. Celty talks to Shizuo, who helps her find the portrait painter. However, the portrait painter cannot draw the head of the dullahan because he has no knowledge of its appearance. Shinra later tells Celty to give up looking for her head so they can live together forever, only to upset her and cause her to leave. Long ago, Shinra first saw Celty when he was a child. His father, Shingen Kishitani, offered Celty a place to stay in exchange for being dissected. During the dissection, her wounds and bruises healed rapidly, exposing her immortality. In the present, it is revealed that Shinra was the man that told the portrait painter earlier that the dullahan was perfect without the head.
5	"False Advertising"; Transliteration: "Yōtōkuniku" (Japanese: 羊頭狗肉)	Shinya Kawatsura	Sadayuki Murai	February 5, 2010	July 24, 2011
Celty tries to collect a briefcase from a man for her job in an alleyway before she is attacked by a shadowy slasher. The shadowy slasher knocks off Celty's helmet, but the shadowy slasher runs off when Celty tries to retaliate. Upon seeing that Celty is headless, the man runs away in fear. Celty's wound whispers that she is a monster. The events of Seiji's sudden leave and Anri's first appearance are reviewed. A teacher named Takashi Nasujima tries to molest Anri in the school hallway, but Masaomi prevents Nasujima from doing so. At the park, Mikado and Masaomi learn from Anri that her friend Mika, who is a stalker, has gone missing because Seiji, who is being stalked, rejected Mika. As Masaomi wanders the district, he tells himself that he must keep Mikado away from the dark side of the district because Masaomi himself has already been there, and he also notes that he gained courage since Mikado came to Ikebukuro. Rumors are being spread regarding how the Yellow Scarves defeated the Blue Squares, which are two rivaling color gangs. Coming out of a convenience store, Mikado sees Seiji and the redheaded girl, but he realizes their "romantic getaway". Masaomi sees Mikado, but they both end up being surrounded by the Yellow Scarves at a street corner. During the time when Celty encountered the shadowy slasher in the alleyway, the man runs past the Yellow Scarves and the shadowy slasher attacks them instead. This allows Mikado and Masaomi to escape. Izaya visits a pale girl in a hospital, telling him of how she spotted Masaomi outside the window from a distance. The pale girl's cell phone displays a picture of Masaomi and her together. Masaomi later accepts being in a love triangle with Mikado and Anri.
6	"Active Interest"; Transliteration: "Tōhonseisō" (Japanese: 東奔西走)	Yorihisa Koyata	Ai Ōta	February 12, 2010	July 31, 2011
In an online chat room, rumors are being heard that people have been missing lately and are being used as raw materials for experiments. Morita, Asanuma and Kanazawa enter a dilapidated hotel with illegal immigrants, kidnapping a foreign ticket seller named Kazutano. When Morita and Asanuma restrain Kazutano, Kanazawa attempts to sedate Kazutano with chloroform, leading Kazutano to accidentally knock over the bottle and spill it. This then makes them all drowsy. After the Van Gang go out to eat at Simon's sushi restaurant Russia Sushi, they learn that their friend Kazutano was kidnapped. Hashim, a young boy who witnessed the abduction, tells the Van Gang the license plate number of the black van of the human traffickers. Kyohei contacts Shinra to send Celty to rescue Kazutano. Elsewhere, Namie Yagiri, the chief of her family-owned company Yagiri Pharmaceuticals and Seiji's older sister, tells her direct subordinate Yoshida that the supply of human materials must be increased substantially. Celty finds that Shinra gave her a shopping list instead of the license plate number, but she failed to contact him since he was showering. Kyohei calls Kazutano's phone, but Izaya, who happens to pass by the sleeping Kanazawa possessing the phone, answers it. The Van Gang find Kanazawa, thanks to Izaya's directions, while Kyohei calls Asanuma from Kazutano's phone with a disguised voice to meet up at the exchange point. Kyohei contemplates that Erika, Walker and Saburo were initially his friends before they were all officially members of the Dollars. The Van Gang rescue Kazutano and capture Asanuma, who reveals that all three human traffickers bring the abducted people to Yagiri Pharmaceuticals Lab Six which is being used to experiment on humans.
7	"Bad-ass Dude"; Transliteration: "Kokushimusō" (Japanese: 国士無双)	Yūki Yase	Toshizō Nemoto	February 19, 2010	August 7, 2011
Shizuo walks around the district with Tom Tanaka, a debt collector and Shizuo's close friend. Later, Shizuo sees a poster for a movie starring actor Kasuka Heiwajima, who is aliased Yūhei Hanejima and Shizuo's younger brother. It is explained that Shizuo became violent during childhood for being teased or provoked by Kasuka as well as his grade school classmates. In fact, he hurled objects out of anger and ended up being hospitalized many times due to fracturing his bones. As Shizuo once saw a bakery shop owner being robbed one day, he defeated the robbers but injured the owner in the process. When Shizuo was a student at Raira Academy, Shinra and Izaya were his classmates. Izaya was proven to be a worthy adversary against Shizuo, who was soon challenged by gang members sent by Izaya, but none prevailed over Shizuo. After graduating, Shizuo went through a number of jobs, though each of them ended with him getting fired over losing his temper. He later settled as a bartender, and Kasuka brought him a set of bartender uniforms in order to show his gratitude and to hope this job will last. Unfortunately, Izaya sets up Shizuo and ruins the job. Shizuo later encountered Tom, who hired Shizuo as the muscle for his debt collection agency. In the present, they go to an arcade to collect debt from a few delinquents. However, Shizuo destroys the arcade after the delinquents fails to pay up. He vents all his frustration to Celty, who comments that he really loves his brother. Shizuo heads back to work after feeling much better, yet after seeing Izaya once more, he becomes angry again.
8	"Ephemeral Dream"; Transliteration: "Nankanoyume" (Japanese: 南柯之夢)	Tetsuo Ichimura	Aya Yoshinaga	February 26, 2010	August 14, 2011
Celty has a recurring dream of finding her head, but is unable to reclaim it. As Shinra explains the connection between dreams and memories, she wonders if she loves him. Because she has the day off, Shinra takes the day off too, and Celty decides to cook for him. Elsewhere, Kyohei waits outside Yagiri Pharmaceuticals but leaves after deciding not to investigate further. Afterwards, a young man attacks the company gates with firecrackers strapped to himself. Although Shinra is overjoyed with the quality of Celty's cooking, she believes that he is forcing himself to eat and gets rid of the food. Celty storms out of the apartment after she disagrees with the fact that she is fine the way she is without her head, according to Shinra. Shortly after, Yoshida arrives at the apartment and tells Shinra that there is someone to fix up right way. Meanwhile, when Anri's shoes have gone missing after school, Masaomi rushes to track down the culprit, leaving Mikado and Anri to locate the shoes in the classroom. After Anri goes home in sandals, Mikado finds them outside and later returns it to her. A young Russian woman named Shiri walks around with a notebook around her neck, asking people to write down what they are looking for. As Shinra treats the young man who attacked Yagiri Pharmaceuticals, Yoshida reminds him that Namie needs him to keep her secret. Celty later accompanies Shinra to dinner at Russia Sushi, and the pair receive fortune cookies. Celty shows to Shrina that her fortune reads she will find what she is looking for, while Shinra hides from Celty that his fortune reads his love is unrequited. Seiji tells the redheaded girl that he loves her and calls her Celty. For the first time in years, Celty has a dream of when she was whole. In her dream, her head looks just like that of the redheaded girl.
9	"Love and Cherish"; Transliteration: "Iirenren" (Japanese: 依依恋恋)	Takashi Yamamoto	Aya Yoshinaga	March 5, 2010	August 21, 2011
Seiji and the redheaded girl are in the park. When Seiji leaves to buy drinks, the redheaded girl drops his phone into a fountain. Namie becomes nervous because Seiji cannot be contacted or found. Worried that the police might find him, Namie decides to handle the situation herself, going to Izaya for help. In the past, Namie and Seiji were often together while in the care of their uncle Seitarō Yagiri. After Namie learned that Seiji has fallen in love with Celty's head in her uncle's study, she moved it to Yagiri Pharmaceuticals Lab Six. Shortly after, Celty's head was stolen. Some time later, Seiji calls Namie saying that he killed Mika, after Mika discovered Celty's head in Seiji's room. In the present, Izaya informs Namie that Seiji will be shortly in police custody. Earlier that day, the redheaded girl receives a message on her cell phone saying she is being pursued and attempts to run away with Seiji. They pass by Shizuo and Celty, who recognizes the redheaded girl's head as her own, urging Celty to chase after the redheaded girl. The redheaded girl bumps into Mikado, who helps her escape from Celty. Seiji tries to stop Shizuo by stabbing him, expressing his love for the redheaded girl, which causes Shizuo to headbutt Seiji in the end. Shinra questions Celty to know what she wants to do with the redheaded girl and her head. Namie reveals to Seiji that she had the redheaded girl created from Mika's body. Namie later orders her subordinates to find and retrieve the redheaded girl and to apply deadly force if necessary. Mikado houses the redheaded girl, and he perceives that she has amnesia.
10	"Never Before Seen"; Transliteration: "Kūzenzetsugo" (Japanese: 空前絶後)	Yui Umemoto	Ai Ōta	March 12, 2010	August 28, 2011
At night, Mikado tells Masaomi about his encounter with the redheaded girl, but Masaomi can hardly believe it. Mikado has thought about wanting an extraordinary life, deciding to allow the redheaded girl to stay with him. The next day at Raira Academy, Masaomi creates a poll of suspected students of being the members of the Dollars, Masaomi himself voted for a student named Ryo Takiguchi as part of the Dollars. Mikado and Masaomi go to the school roof and find Takiguchi, who admits to being a member of the Dollars. Takiguchi adds that he was invited by an unknown text message, deciding to join for the lack of rules and hierarchy, something that the two must keep discreet. After school, Mikado is about to walk home with Anri, but they are stopped by Youko and her boyfriend Takashi. Youko blames Mikado for allowing Izaya to smash her cell phone, having to buy a new one. Takashi starts threatening Mikado, but Celty shows up and knock out Takashi, while Izaya appears and scares away Youko. Mikado realizes Celty must be looking for the redheaded girl and heads home, but Mikado is closely tailed by Celty and Izaya. Celty tells Mikado about herself and how she is searching for her head. Mikado agrees to lead Celty to the redheaded girl and clear up the misunderstanding. When Mikado returns home, he finds that the redheaded girl is missing, and Mikado is suddenly pinned down by Namie's subordinates from Yagiri Pharmaceuticals. Namie's subordinates escape after Celty and Izaya break into the room. Mikado comes up with a plan to save the redheaded girl and reveals to them that he is the leader of the Dollars.
11	"Storm and Stress"; Transliteration: "Shippūdotō" (Japanese: 疾風怒濤)	Yorihisa Koyata	Toshizō Nemoto	March 19, 2010	September 4, 2011
Shinra asks Celty for her hand in marriage, considering what she has learned in Ikebukuro for twenty years. Mikado calls Namie and tells her to meet him in a crowded area outside Tokyu Hands, the downtown chain department store, where he claims that he will give her information about the redheaded girl in exchange for the truth about what happened to Mika. Mikado pieces together the ugly truth and asks Namie to turn herself in. Namie signals to her subordinates to approach the meeting place, but before they can reach Mikado, he sends a text message from his cell phone, which gets sent to practically everyone around them and causes a spectacular commotion. Meanwhile, Kyohei brings the redheaded girl to Celty on the roof of Tokyu Hands. It is revealed that the crowd of people are all recent members of the Dollars, who have gathered for a meeting that Mikado orchestrated. It is explained that Mikado was the original founder of the Dollars, and that the Van Gang found the redheaded girl after she ran away from Mikado's home. In the present, the redheaded girl says that her name is Celty, then Celty herself is unable to bear taking her head back. Celty makes a grandiose entrance into the middle of the crowd and takes out Namie's subordinates. In the process, Celty allows herself to be revealed as headless, eliciting various reactions from the incredulous crowd. Namie escapes in the chaos, while Seiji suddenly appears from behind to attack Mikado after learning his identity and his involvement with the redheaded girl.
12	"Yin and Yang"; Transliteration: "Umusōsei" (Japanese: 有無相生)	Shinya Kawatsura	Noboru Takagi	March 26, 2010	September 11, 2011
Celty defends Mikado from Seiji's attack. The redheaded girl appears and reveals that she is actually Mika Harima. Mika had survived Seiji's brutal beating after discovering the stolen head at his apartment, in which Mika was given the choice of having her face reconstructed to that of Celty by a surgeon who revealed Celty's name to Mika. Also, Namie made Mika take drugs in order to erase her memories, which caused her amnesia. Thus, Celty's head is still in the possession of Yagiri Pharmaceuticals Lab Six. Celty then realizes that Shinra was the surgeon responsible for operating on Mika's face. She confronts him, and he reveals that he kept the secret from her out of fear of losing her, leading them to reconcile. In the aftermath of the meeting of the Dollars, Seiji reluctantly accepts Mika as his girlfriend for the time being. Celty accepts and enjoys her own existence, even though she has not yet found her head. Anri asks Mikado to lunch, suggesting the possible beginning of a relationship. In the past, Izaya sent Mika text messages on her phone to warn her, later contacting Mika to run away from Mikado's home since he already knew that Namie would send her subordinates there. In the present, Izaya believes in a Nordic theory, in which Celty is a valkyrie, an armored female angel who guides the soul of a fallen warrior to Valhalla. He reveals Celty's head in his possession while stating that Celty's head is not on a battlefield and therefore remains asleep. He wishes to be chosen by Celty as her warrior, but he first needs to start a war that only he can win.
12.5	"Heaven's Vengeance"; Transliteration: "Tenmōkaikai" (Japanese: 天網恢恢)	Yui Umemoto	Sadayuki Murai	August 25, 2010 (DVD)	September 18, 2011
Tom comes to a couple's apartment to collect debt from a man named Ginjiro. His girlfriend Hanako gives him a red bag to escape with down a tree. However, Shizuo swings Ginjiro off of the tree, and Ginjiro flies over the freeway. This red bag, containing a change of clothes and food, drops on Saburo's van on the freeway, while Erika and Walker believe that it belongs to aliens. Mikado invites Masaomi and Anri to go to a festival. Once there, they are stopped by waitresses at a café and bar restaurant. They are offered food in exchange for trying on costumes. Celty is contacted by Izaya to retrieve him another red bag. During the festival, Ginjiro attempts to steal a third red bag filled with money, but becomes surrounded by men from the Tsunohazu Group as well as a foreign syndicate that smuggles animals and has a rare animal in a red bag stolen from them. They both contact Izaya for help, and Izaya tells them both that the Black Rider has each of their bags. After Celty retrieves Izaya's red bag, she is soon chased by the foreign syndicate. Celty manages to lose them, but the foreign syndicate notice Ginjiro's red bag on top of Saburo's van, which Erika and Walker put up there to return to the aliens. While Saburo tries to avoid the foreign syndicate, Ginjiro's red bag falls off Saburo's van and drops into a bush. Celty lures the Tsunohazu Group and the foreign syndicate into a dark abandoned warehouse. The Awakusu Group arrives to splatter luminous paint on the Tsunohazu Group and the foreign syndicate, in which the foreign syndicate are forced to flee while the Tsunohazu Group are beaten up by the Awakusu Group. Celty's red bag is revealed to contain a rare Cape Verde giant skink, while Izaya shows up with the red bag of money, which he took from Ginjiro. Izaya and Haruya Shiki, an executive member of the Awakusu Group, reveal to Celty that the foreign syndicate was originally going to sell the Cape Verde giant skink to the Awakusu Group, but tried to double-cross them by selling it to the Tsunohazu Group instead. Shiki takes the money while Izaya takes the Cape Verde giant skink. Meanwhile, Mikado, Masaomi and Anri walk by in the streets, where they soon find the red bag with clothes and food in the bush. They return it to Hanako, who is waiting at a police department office to claim it. Ginjiro reunites with Hanako, and they share the food from their red bag. Izaya contacts the Tsunohazu Group and tells them that Shizuo stole their red bag of money. They confront Shizuo, who sends them flying out a window. The Tsunohazu Group creates an aurora in the sky while flying over the city due to their luminous paint, leading everyone to believe that it was an extraterrestrial sighting.
13	"Takes A Sudden Turn"; Transliteration: "Kyūtenchokka" (Japanese: 急転直下)	Yūki Yase	Toshizō Nemoto	April 9, 2010	September 25, 2011
Six months has passed since the meeting of the Dollars was held at Ikebukuro. After Celty revealed her headless form to the public, there are news reports of a mysterious assailant known as the "Slasher", who assaults their victims by slashing them with a blade yet never kills them. Masaomi provokes Mikado by calling Anri a cute girl. The police department bring in Kinnosuke Kuzuhara, a reckless police officer specially assigned to apprehend Celty. Because of Kinnosuke's relentlessness, their first encounter traumatizes Celty. After returning home, Celty is asked by Shinra to pick up Shingen, who just arrived in Japan. Sadly enough, Celty saves Shingen from being bullied by a group of delinquents led by Hōrada. Namie now works as Izaya's secretary, in which Shingen's company Nebula Corporation bought out Yagiri Pharmaceuticals. Masaomi, deciding to flirt with other girls, is approached by members of the Yellow Scarves, who ask him to return to the gang, but he refuses. Mikado and Anri take a walk to the park, but they decide to part ways, having confused feelings. Anri is soon cornered and bullied by the Ganguro Girls again, but the Slasher appears and attacks the Ganguro Girls.
14	"Turmoil Reigns"; Transliteration: "Butsujōsōzen" (Japanese: 物情騒然)	Mitsue Yamazaki	Ai Ōta	April 16, 2010	October 2, 2011
Mikado, Celty and Izaya, confirmed online users in the online chat room, discuss the recent attack of the Slasher. Shingen learns from Shinra that he was attacked by members of the Yellow Scarves before Celty came to rescue him. Despite realizing that Celty is in love with Shinra, Shingen blurts out that he was responsible for sending Celty's head to Yagiri Pharmaceuticals in the first place. After being pressed for more information, Shingen runs away, and Celty goes looking for him. Celty encounters Mikado, who is bothered by rumors that the attacks of the Slasher are being perpetrated by the Dollars, and she tells him that she will help by looking into the incidents. She then goes to see Izaya, who mentions of a demonic blade that the Slasher possesses called "Saika". Shingen later goes to see Izaya, supporting his plan to awaken the head by putting the body in a warlike environment. After telling Anri that he will leave her alone with Mikado, Masaomi finally visits the pale girl, Saki Mikajima, in her hospital room. Celty eventually learns from Shinra that Shingen used Saika to separate her head from her body, and later had the weapon sold to a secondhand antiques dealer. As Anri walks home from school, the Slasher comes up behind her and prepares to strike.
15	"Dumb Like a Fox"; Transliteration: "Gushaittoku" (Japanese: 愚者一得)	Yui Umemoto	Sadayuki Murai	April 23, 2010	October 9, 2011
A reporter named Shuji Niekawa is traveling around the district in search for the toughest guy in Ikebukuro. Shuji interviews Simon, Shiki, Izaya and Celty separately, concluding that the toughest guy in Ikebukuro is Shizuo. After heading back home from a long day of work, Shuji is attacked by the Slasher. It is revealed that Anri's parents died in an accident five years ago, leaving her the only survivor in the family. Shuji wakes up in the hospital with no memory of the incident. He is later possessed by the spirit of the Slasher and is directed to keep an eye on Anri. He follows her on her way home and attempts to attack her with a knife. The Van Gang knock down Shuji with their van in order to rescue Anri, but as Shuji gets up unharmed, he is knocked down again by Celty on her motorcycle with Shizuo in tow. Shuji gets up yet again unharmed, and the spirit professes its love for Shizuo upon seeing him. An enraged Shizuo then rips out a door on Saburo's van and bludgeons Shuji with it.
16	"Mutual Love"; Transliteration: "Sōshisōai" (Japanese: 相思相愛)	Yorihisa Koyata	Aya Yoshinaga	April 30, 2010	October 16, 2011
After Shuji is knocked out cold by Shizuo, and Celty confiscates the knife that Shuji dropped. Believing the knife could be Saika, Celty shows it to Shinra, who says that Saika is a demonic blade that shows its love for humanity by possessing a human in order to slash others, but it had disappeared five years ago. Celty and Shinra then realize that the knife is just an ordinary butcher knife. A scene also reveals that Haruna Niekawa, Shuji's daughter, is the Slasher who attacked Shuji at the front of his house. Meanwhile, Anri is visited by Haruna, who reveals that she and Nasujima were in love with each other in the past until he rejected her one day. Haruna says that she forgives Nasujima because she loves him. However, Haruna begins to approach Anri with glowing red eyes holding a knife, calling her a leech for depending on others. Shinra realizes that Saika is impregnating itself into many people throughout the district. Celty learns that Saika is after Shizuo, and that Saika is waiting for Shizuo at South Ikebukuro Park. While Shizuo and Izaya are fighting, Celty finds Shizuo and picks him up with her motorcycle. Nasujima visits Anri's home, but runs away after seeing Haruna, who runs after Nasujima. Anri is soon attacked by Haruna's "children" of Saika. At South Ikebukuro Park, Celty and Shizuo are soon surrounded by a Saika Army professing their love for Shizuo because of his strength. Accepting his strength for the first time, Shizuo decides to fight back against the Saika Army. It is revealed that the disappearance of Saika five years ago was due to someone managing to suppress it for that long. When Haruna is finally able to corner Nasujima, it is revealed that he extorted money from her and tried to abandon her once he got bored. Anri then appears in front of Haruna unharmed, soon unveiling that she possesses the original Saika and that she is the "mother" of Haruna's blade.
17	"Everything Changes"; Transliteration: "Uitenpen" (Japanese: 有為転変)	Shinya Kawatsura	Toshizō Nemoto	May 7, 2010	October 23, 2011
Shizuo begins recklessly assaulting the Saika Army at South Ikebukuro Park, telling Celty to look for the one responsible for controlling them. Anri pokes Haruna with Saika, showing Haruna a flashback of how she became its wielder. Anri's father has gone bankrupt from his business as an antiques dealer, leading him to physically abusing his wife and daughter. As Anri's father was on the verge of strangling Anri to death, Anri's mother Sayaka Sonohara used Saika to kill Anri's father before killing herself. Anri then placed her hands on Saika. In the present, Anri assimilates Haruna, rendering her unconscious, and reverts the possessed crowd back to normal. Celty shows up, and Anri reveals that she was the shadowy slasher before, who previously saw Celty cornering Nasujima in the alleyway. While Haruna loves Nasujima, Anri states that she detests him. Nasujima runs off, and Celty takes Haruna to have her treated by Shinra. Anri is later put in the hospital and is visited by Mikado, who warns her to stay away from Shizuo and Celty, the most unusual people in the city. Izaya tells Namie that he was behind the string of events involving the Slasher, including how Nasujima owed a debt to the Awakusu Group, how Izaya himself purposely allowed Nasujima to steal a briefcase of cash in hopes of blackmailing Haruna and how Anri as the original Saika appeared on the scene in the alleyway. Izaya's intentions were to break the city down into the Dollars, the Yellow Scarves and the Saika Army as the three main factions in order to set up a battlefield to awaken Celty's head. Things did still go the way that Izaya wanted, but Anri now leads the Saika Army instead of Haruna. Due to Anri being put in the hospital, Mikado contacts the Dollars, asking for information about the Slasher, while Masaomi returns to his position as the leader of the Yellow Scarves.
18	"Out of Your Control"; Transliteration: "Shiseiyūmei" (Japanese: 死生有命)	Kiyoshi Matsuda	Noboru Takagi	May 14, 2010	October 30, 2011
One year ago, Masaomi and Izaya went to the hospital to visit Saki, Masaomi's girlfriend at the time, who has fallen into a comatose state. Izaya provoked Masaomi by saying that the latter will always come back to Saki due to their past life together. In present time, Mikado and Masaomi are walking Anri from the hospital after she had recovered. Masaomi then receives a phone call apparently from the Yellow Scarves and takes a sudden leave, with Mikado and Anri oblivious. Masaomi retells of his past with Saki during the time he was first the leader of the Yellow Scarves. His acquaintance with Izaya is explained, being Saki's guardian. When Masaomi and Saki dated, the Blue Squares had begun to attack the Yellow Scarves. With Izaya's advice, Masaomi and the Yellow Scarves managed to turn the tables on the Blue Squares. However, the Blue Squares led by Ran Izumii kidnapped Saki and broke her leg in retaliation. Masaomi tried to contact Izaya, who intentionally ignored his calls. Masaomi ran to try and save her but froze out of fear. The Van Gang rebelled against their fellow members of the Blue Squares, saving Saki and admitting her to the hospital. Later, Saki awakens from her comatose, but is bedridden. Ran was arrested and his gang fell apart, while Masaomi left the Yellow Scarves before attending Raira Academy with Mikado and Anri. In the present, the Yellow Scarves report to Masaomi that a girl was spying on them at their hideout in a warehouse, and Masaomi orders them to capture her. The girl is revealed to be Anri, who is shocked to learn that Masaomi is affiliated with the Yellow Scarves.
19	"Anarchy"; Transliteration: "Sōtensudenishisu" (Japanese: 蒼天已死)	Yūki Yase	Ai Ōta	May 21, 2010	November 6, 2011
After running away from the Yellow Scarves, Anri hides in a narrow crevice, scared of what Masaomi may do to her if she was discovered. At the time when Mikado and Masaomi fetched Anri out of the hospital, she was puzzled over Masaomi's strange behavior. In the online chat room, Mikado, Masaomi, Anri, Celty and Izaya discussed that there might be a war between the three factions due to attacks of the Slasher that ended recently. Anri learned from her children of Saika within the Yellow Scarves that Masaomi is their leader. She asked them to lead her to Masaomi in order to be certain. In the present, Celty arrives and grabs the attention of the Yellow Scarves before Anri is discovered. Celty rescues Anri, hiding her face while changing her motorcycle into a horse. Hōrada throws a metal pipe at Celty and Anri, who is forced to unsheathe Saika and slash the metal pipe in half before departing. Due to the Headless Rider's involvement with the Dollars, the Yellow Scarves are forced to come to the conclusion that the Slasher is part of the Dollars. In the online chat room, Izaya fills Mikado in on the details of the gang war between the Yellow Scarves and the Blue Squares. Moreover, Izaya tells Mikado that most of the Blue Squares joined the Yellow Scarves following the former's disbandment. Masaomi realizes that he had only fought as the leader of the Yellow Scarves for Saki's sake, but now he fights for Mikado's sake.
20	"A New King Will Arise"; Transliteration: "Kōtenmasanitatsu" (Japanese: 黄天當立)	Yukihiro Shino	Sadayuki Murai	May 28, 2010	November 13, 2011
At Russia Sushi, Masaomi confronts the Van Gang, looking into matters concerning the Dollars. Since the Van Gang were former members of the Blue Squares, Masaomi tries to get answer from them. After much talk about what happened among them in the past, Masaomi still believes that the Slasher and the Black Rider are secretly working with the leader of the Dollars. Izaya reveals to Namie that someone ran off with a bunch of handguns from the Awakusu Group six months ago, in which Celty was able to recover most of them but there is still one handgun unaccounted for. Masaomi meets with Izaya, who eventually reveals that Mikado is the leader of the Dollars. In the online chat room, Izaya tells Mikado, Masaomi, Anri and Celty that the head the Yellow Scarves wants to meet with the leader of the Dollars and challenge him to a showdown. During a meeting at the hideout of the Yellow Scarves, Masaomi orders his gang not to harm the Dollars. Takiguchi is later severely beaten in the streets by several members of the Yellow Scarves led by Hōrada despite Masaomi's orders.
21	"Everything Covered in Fog"; Transliteration: "Gorimuchū" (Japanese: 五里霧中)	Yui Umemoto	Toshizō Nemoto	June 4, 2010	November 20, 2011
Mikado visits Takiguchi in the hospital, surprised that Masaomi failed to stop by earlier. After stating his resignation from the Dollars due to its fatality, Takiguchi asks Mikado if he is a member, but he responds in hesitation and refusal. Masaomi is maddened by the fact that his fellow gang members disobeyed his direct orders, though Hōrada continues to lead an attack against the Dollars when Masaomi is not looking. Mikado begins to worry because more and more members of the Dollars are stating their resignation. Celty and Shinra discuss how Anri, Masaomi and Mikado each have a secret that the other two do not know about. After Takiguchi returns from the hospital, Mikado and Anri go their separate ways after school. Bringing it upon herself, Anri orders her children of Saika within the Yellow Scarves to stop any conflict that they witness between the Yellow Scarves and the Dollars. At the hideout of the Yellow Scarves, Hōrada punishes three members for suddenly acting strange. However, after being given a detailed description by another member named Higa, Masaomi realizes that Anri, the same girl from before who was spying on them, was hypnotizing the three members. Despite Masaomi's orders to stand down, Hōrada and the Yellow Scarves find and surround Anri in the streets. While on the forums of the Dollars, Mikado views posts from the members of the Dollars who are witnessing a girl being captured. He realizes that this girl is Anri.
22	"Declaration of Disbandment"; Transliteration: "Kaisansengen" (Japanese: 解散宣言)	Shinya Kawatsura	Aya Yoshinaga	June 11, 2010	November 27, 2011
As Anri is being taken by Hōrada and the Yellow Scarves, she is soon able to escape with the help of various members of the Dollars directed by Mikado. Masaomi finds and confronts Anri, accusing her of betraying him while trying to flatter Mikado. Anri slaps Masaomi in response and walks away in disgust. Although Anri is once again found by Hōrada and the Yellow Scarves, Shizuo was luckily nearby and scares off the Yellow Scarves after tossing Hōrada into the sky. Celty arrives and brings Anri to live with her and Shinra for the time being. Mikado decides to disband the Dollars, realizing how violent Hōrada and the Yellow Scarves have become. Meanwhile, Celty and Anri agree that they should try to stop the gang war, so Celty goes off to bring Mikado to help. Masaomi calls Mikado repeatedly, but he refuses to answer. At the same time, Hōrada shoots Shizuo with a handgun, who is now lying lifelessly on the ground, as Hōrada falsely claims that Masaomi ordered him to do so.
23	"Complicated and Confused"; Transliteration: "Sensakubansō" (Japanese: 千錯万綜)	Yūki Yase	Noboru Takagi	June 18, 2010	December 4, 2011
Masaomi learns from Hōrada that he has been marooned by the Yellow Scarves. Celty confronts Mikado and reveals the truth about Masaomi and Anri. Meanwhile, Shizuo knocks on Shinra's door, heavily wounded by the gunshots. Shinra gives him medical treatment while Shizuo swears to kill Masaomi and the Yellow Scarves for shooting him point-blank. Anri then runs away upon hearing this. Shinra chases Anri but is unable to catch her, so he calls Celty and tells her about Shizuo and Anri. Masaomi musters the courage to return to the hideout of the Yellow Scarves, where he learns from Hōrada that the Blue Squares have taken over from the inside. Despite claiming that he is no longer affiliated with the gang, he accepts that he is no longer able to run away from his past. Hōrada orders the Yellow Scarves to attack Masaomi, who then defends himself but eventually falls to his knees. When Hōrada readies himself to shoot Masaomi, one of the children of Saika within the Yellow Scarves knocks out the handgun from Hōrada's hand. Anri suddenly arrives at the hideout, then Mikado and Celty arrive thereafter.
24	"Selfless Devotion"; Transliteration: "Sokutenkyoshi" (Japanese: 則天去私)	Yorihisa Koyata	Noboru Takagi	June 25, 2010	December 11, 2011
When the Yellow Scarves start attacking each other, Kyohei and Saburo make a comeback, revealing that their friends from the Dollars have infiltrated the Yellow Scarves. Masaomi is then taken to the hospital by Mikado and Anri. Celty tries to chase Hōrada, who managed to escape the warehouse. Hōrada drives away with his gang onto the freeway. However, Hōrada encounters Shizuo, who hurls a large traffic signpost to destroy the roof of his car. Kinnosuke shows up and arrests Hōrada and his gang. Higa, revealed to be Izaya's mole for the Yellow Scarves, brings the handgun that Hōrada carried to Izaya, who says that it belongs to the Awakusu Group. However, it is revealed that Higa is one of the children of Saika. Anri then shows up and attempts to cut Izaya, but he manages to escape. While Izaya walks home, he encounters Simon, who immediately punches him in the eye and sends him flying into a sculpture. Simon then explains to Izaya that Saki informed him of Izaya's involvement in the recent conflicts. At the hospital, Masaomi wakes up to Saki standing in his room, and they confess their love to each other. Several days later, Masaomi and Saki elope, leaving Mikado and Anri on their own. The Blue Squares is having internal problems, the Yellow Scarves has calmed down temporarily, and the Dollars is revived once again. In the online chat room, Masaomi is invited to be a part of the group. Masaomi and Saki are last seen leaving on a train, while Mikado and Anri stand on the school rooftop, hoping that Masaomi will return someday.
24.5	"World at Peace (All's Right With The World)"; Transliteration: "Tenkataihei" (Japanese: 天下泰平)	Shinya Kawatsura	Toshizō Nemoto	February 23, 2011 (DVD)	December 18, 2011
Kasuka begins to host a television show to look for the cutest couple in the district, where the winners will debut in his latest movie. A bored Shinra tells a shocked Celty that Kasuka is Shizuo's younger brother, and that Izaya has two younger twin sisters named Mairu Orihara and Kururi Orihara, who are among the crowd of spectators. Mikado and Anri, shy of their dating status, unknowingly appears on the television show as potential candidates for the movie. A man, who posted a death threat towards Kasuka earlier on, approaches Kasuka with a knife, but Shizuo stealthily throws a billboard sign at the man, knocking him out. Izaya contacts Shizuo, unveiling that the man was dumped by his girlfriend, who was a fan of Kasuka, and that he convinced himself that Kasuka stole her from him. Then, Izaya admits that he leaked Kasuka's schedule to the man just so he can mess with Shizuo. Izaya and Shizuo start attacking each other, demolishing much of the edifices, and the event is caught on camera. Several gang members, who were previous attacked by Shizuo, see him on television, using this as an opportunity for revenge. Izaya leads Shizuo onto a street, where Shizuo gets hit by a truck, knocking him out. Shizuo gets up unharmed, and he continues fighting Izaya, while inadvertently causing the gang members to riot against each other. This urges Celty to use her powers by rounding up the gang members and gluing them into the streets. Even though Kinnosuke thanks Celty for what she has done, he goes into hot pursuit after her for the damage she caused upon their first encounter. The story retells to when a young boy enters Ikebukuro by train and meets Mikado. After seeing that the boy will attend Raira Academy, Mikado had a glance of nostalgia when he first had moved to Ikebukuro and had reunited with Masaomi.
